= Women's professional sports =

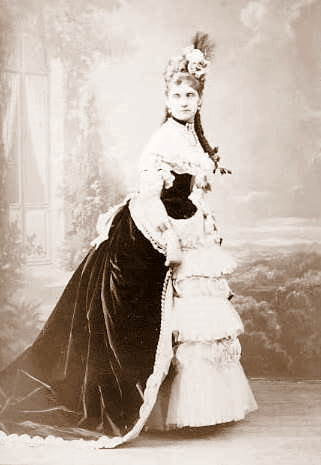
Hélène de Pourtalès American-born Swiss sailor who competed in the 1900 Summer Olympics in Paris representing Switzerland and became the first woman to win an Olympic gold medal.

Women's professional sports are a relatively new phenomenon, having largely emerged within the latter part of the 20th century. Unlike amateur female athletes, professional female athletes are able to acquire an income which allows them to earn a living without requiring another source of income. In international terms, most top female athletes are not paid and work full-time or part-time jobs in addition to their training, practice, and competition schedules. Professional organizations for women in sport are most common in developed countries where there are investors available to buy teams and businesses which can afford to sponsor them in exchange for publicity and the opportunity to promote a variety of their products. Very few governments support professional sports, male or female. Today there are a number of professional women's sport leagues in the United States and Canada.

== History ==
=== Early opposition ===
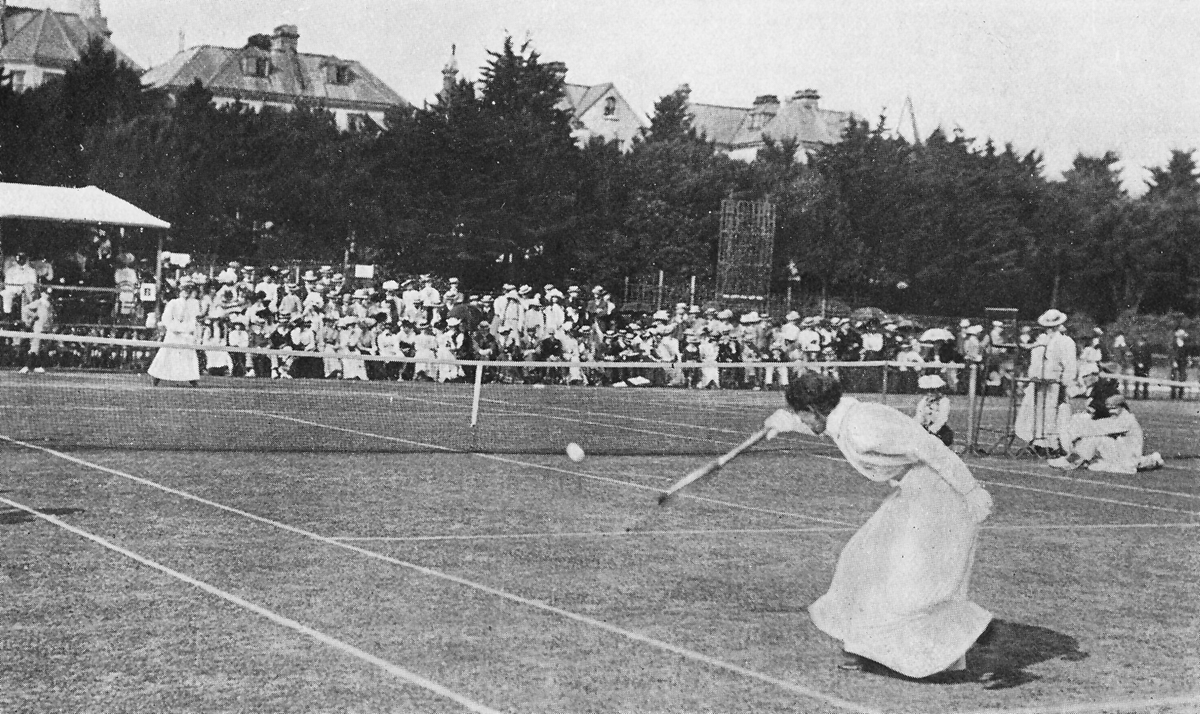
Charlotte Cooper Sterry vs Blanche Bingley Hillyard at Eastbourne. Charlotte Cooper was a pioneering British tennis player who made history as the first female Olympic champion in tennis.

From the 1800s, in Western Europe and some other countries, women's physiology was described as delicate or weaker compared to men, with medical rationales against women's participation in sports centering around the erroneous belief that it could harm their fertility. According to one German writer of the time period, "Violent movements of the body can cause a shift in the position and a loosening of the uterus as well as prolapse and bleeding, with resulting sterility, thus defeating a woman's true purpose in life, i.e., the bringing forth of strong children." The theory of frailty holds that women are naturally weak and frail in comparison to men, and that any physical strength they have stems from the need to protect their children.

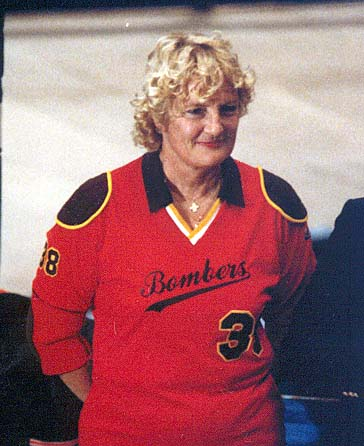
Joan Weston, known as the "Blonde Bomber", was a roller derby star who became one of the highest-paid female athletes in the 1970s.

Other opponents of women's sports argued that participation in sports made women and girls unattractive. The American novelist and sports writer Paul Gallico wrote in his book Farewell to Sport that "unattractive girls are comparatively good sports. Pretty girls are not. The ugly ducklings have taken to sport as an escape and to compensate for whatever it is they lack, sex appeal, charm, ready-made beauty.". Pierre de Coubertin, a founder of the International Olympic Committee, said of watching a female Olympic participant of the winter sport bob-sleighing,

"Seeing a lady with her skirts lifted sliding in this position, usually scratching up the runway with two small pointed sticks which she holds in her hands and which help her to steer the sleigh, that sight represents a true offense to the eyes. Nothing uglier could be imagined."

The involvement of women within the Olympic Games started in the 1900 Games, with 1928 Games being a major breakthrough where three hundred women competed. Since then, female participation has gradually grown, with the number of female participants in 1988 Seoul Games having female participants make up one-fourth of the athletes.

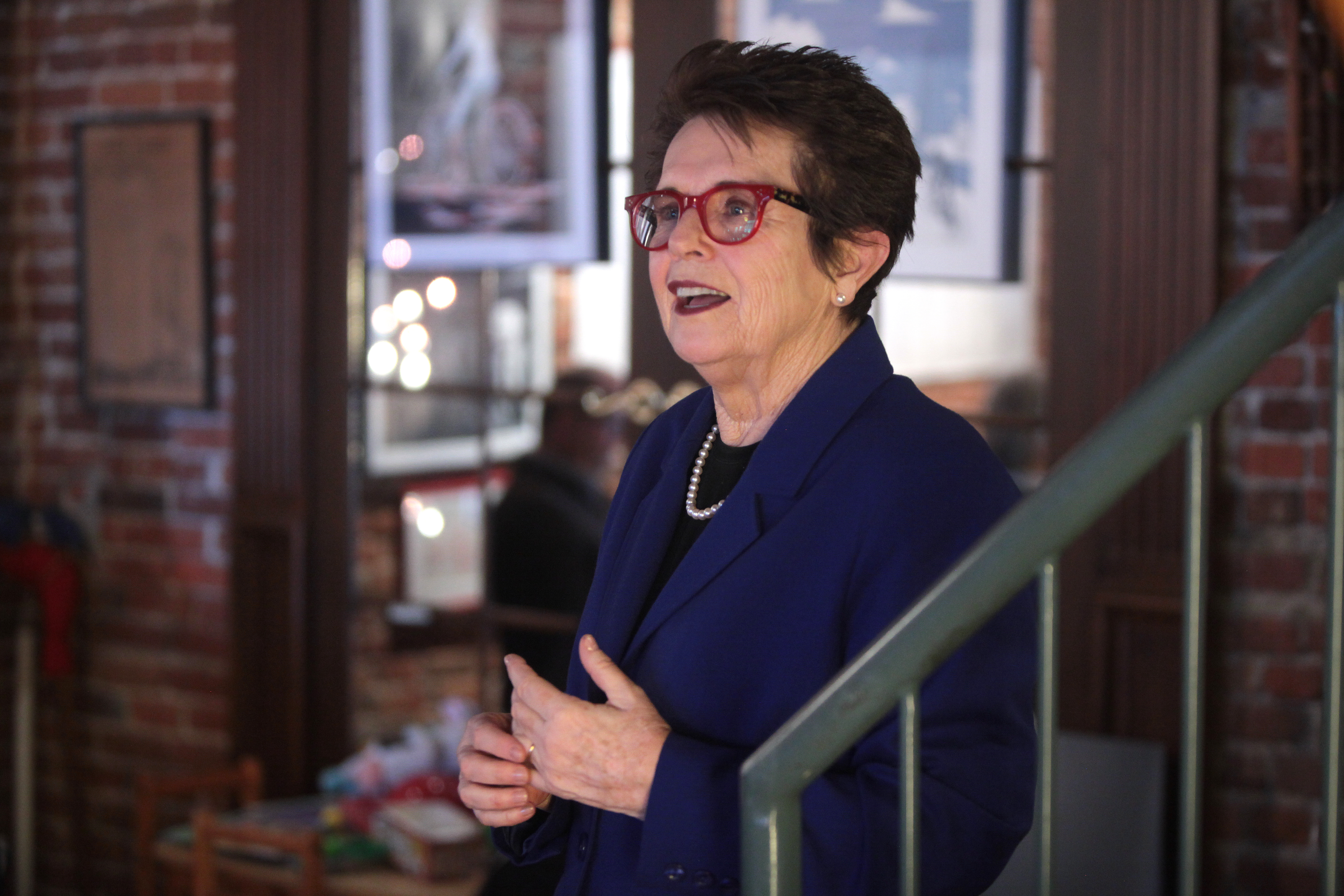
Billie Jean King tennis player who championed gender equality in sports

=== Early pioneers ===
Despite social pressure and, in some cases, bans on participation, examples exist of women competing as professionals in some capacity dating back almost as long as men have.

As early as 1722, women boxers, including Elizabeth Wilkinson, participated in prize fights. Starting in 1917, the players of Dick, Kerr Ladies F.C. were paid 10 shillings per game, drawing tens of thousands of fans to some matches. Professional wrestling has recognized a women's world champion since 1937, when Mildred Burke won the original World Women's title.

=== Contemporary era ===
Beginning in the late 1960s, a few women gained enough recognition for their athletic talent and social acceptance as role models to earn a living playing sports. Most of these were in the United States. Among them was Joan Weston, a roller derby star who was once the highest-paid female in sports, but she was the exception rather than the rule.

Things began to change in 1973 when Billie Jean King won "the Battle of the Sexes" and cracked the glass ceiling on pay for female athletes. Other players, like Martina Navratilova, broke through that ceiling as well, decreasing the gap between women and men athletes' pay on a regular basis rather than occasionally.

Even now, in the 21st century, most professional women's athletes around the world receive very little notoriety or pay compared to men. Life acknowledged the importance of King's achievement in 1990 by naming her one of the "100 Most Important Americans of the 20th Century."

== United States ==
Though women have been pro athletes in the United States since the early 1900s, paid teams and leagues are still uncommon and, as of 2013, female athletes are paid far less than their male counterparts. For instance, the WNBA had its first season in 1997, 51 years after the inception of the men's NBA. The WNBA (under the NBA Board of Governors) pays the top women's players less than 1% of the salary that the top men's players are capable of earning; in 2021, the maximum salary for any WNBA player was $221,450, while the maximum NBA salary was $38,199,000. In 2005, the WNBA team salary cap was $0.673 million; by 2021, this amount had nearly doubled to $1.339 million. However, during this period, the NBA's cap more than doubled, from $43.87 million in 2005 to $109.14 million in 2021.

The Women's United Soccer Association became the first American women's pro league in 2001, but lasted only briefly because of financial sponsorship. Fans enjoyed women's pro soccer for three seasons before executives announced the suspension of the league, despite the women's national soccer team (USWNT) rating it as one of the world's top teams. The absence of a Women's professional football (soccer) league in the United States made it difficult for the USWNT to find new players until Women's Professional Soccer was founded. A 2004 effort to revive the WUSA was launched. On September 4, 2007, a new North American women's professional football league, tentatively named Women's Soccer LLC, was announced, and ultimately launched in 2009 as Women's Professional Soccer. That league folded after its 2012 season, with the current National Women's Soccer League established later that year and beginning play in 2013.

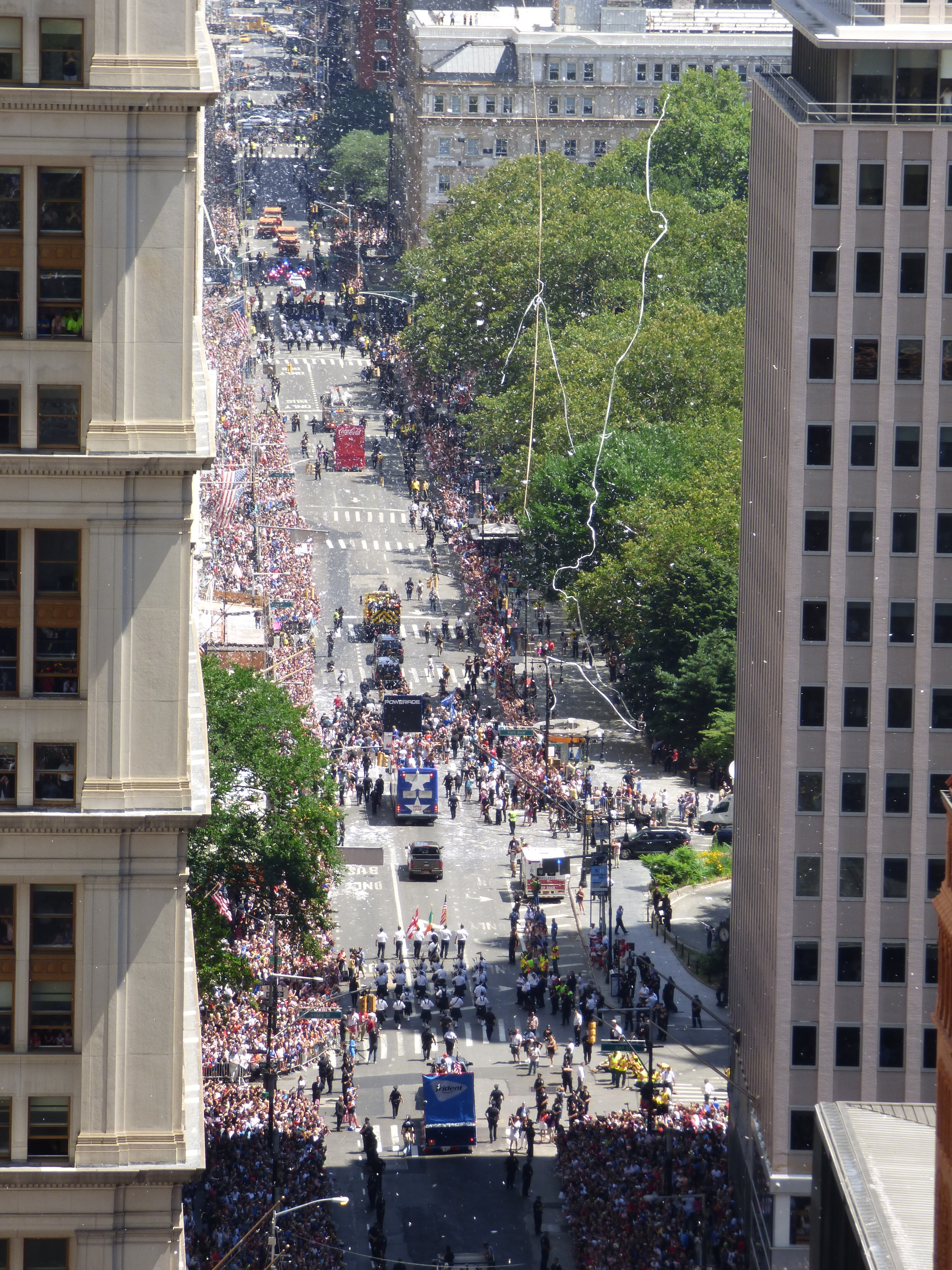
A ticker tape parade in Manhattan celebrating the USWNT's 2015 World Cup victory

== Australia ==
Historical Context

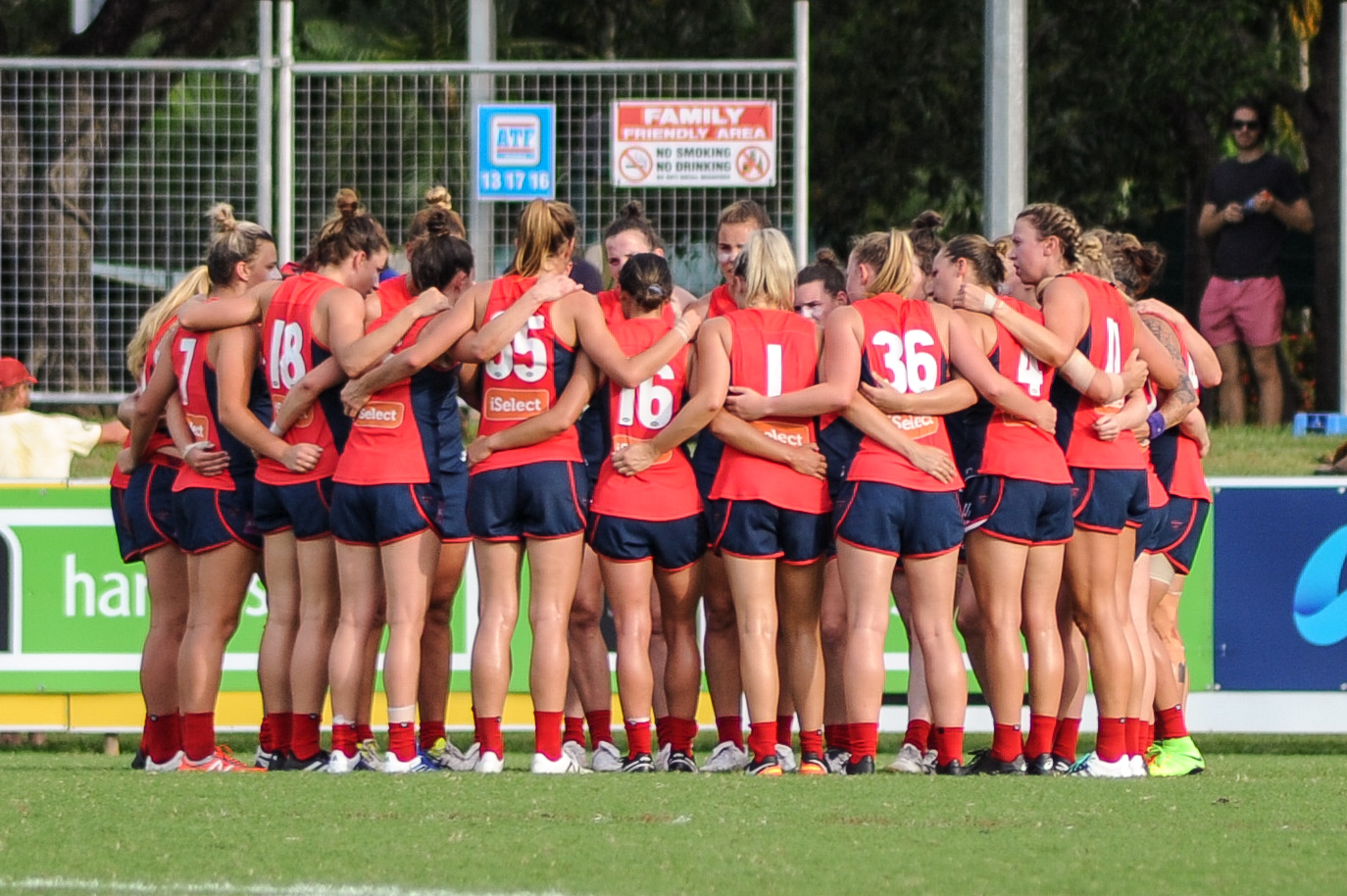
The Melbourne women's Australian Rules Football team is strategizing their game plan.

Throughout the late 1800s and into the early 20th century, women's participation in sports was highly restricted. During this period, women were generally only permitted to swim and were required to wear oversized bathing suits to ensure modesty. It was not until the 1920s and 1930s that women began wearing more fitted bathing suits, allowing for greater freedom in sport. In the early 1900s, women's sports began to diversify with the emergence of more organized teams. Initially, most women's sports clubs were focused on lawn bowls and golf. By the 1930s, athletic clubs for track and field began to appear, marking the start of more gender-specific sports teams.

Developments in Professional Women's Sports in Australia

Launched in 2017, the AFLW has quickly become a major force in Australian women's sports. With all teams operated by existing AFL men's clubs, it has provided a high-profile platform for female Australian Rules Football players and has seen rapid expansion and increasing popularity. Impact: The league has been instrumental in promoting Australian Rules Football among women and has significantly raised the sport's profile through media coverage and fan engagement.

Launched in 2018, the NRL Women's Premiership (NRLW) is Australia's top-level semi-professional women's rugby league competition. Women's rugby league had been played in various local and state-based competitions since 1921. By 2022, NRLW games attracted an average of 200,000 viewers per game, and the Women's State of Origin series saw record viewership, with over 700,000 tuning in for Game I of the 2023 series.

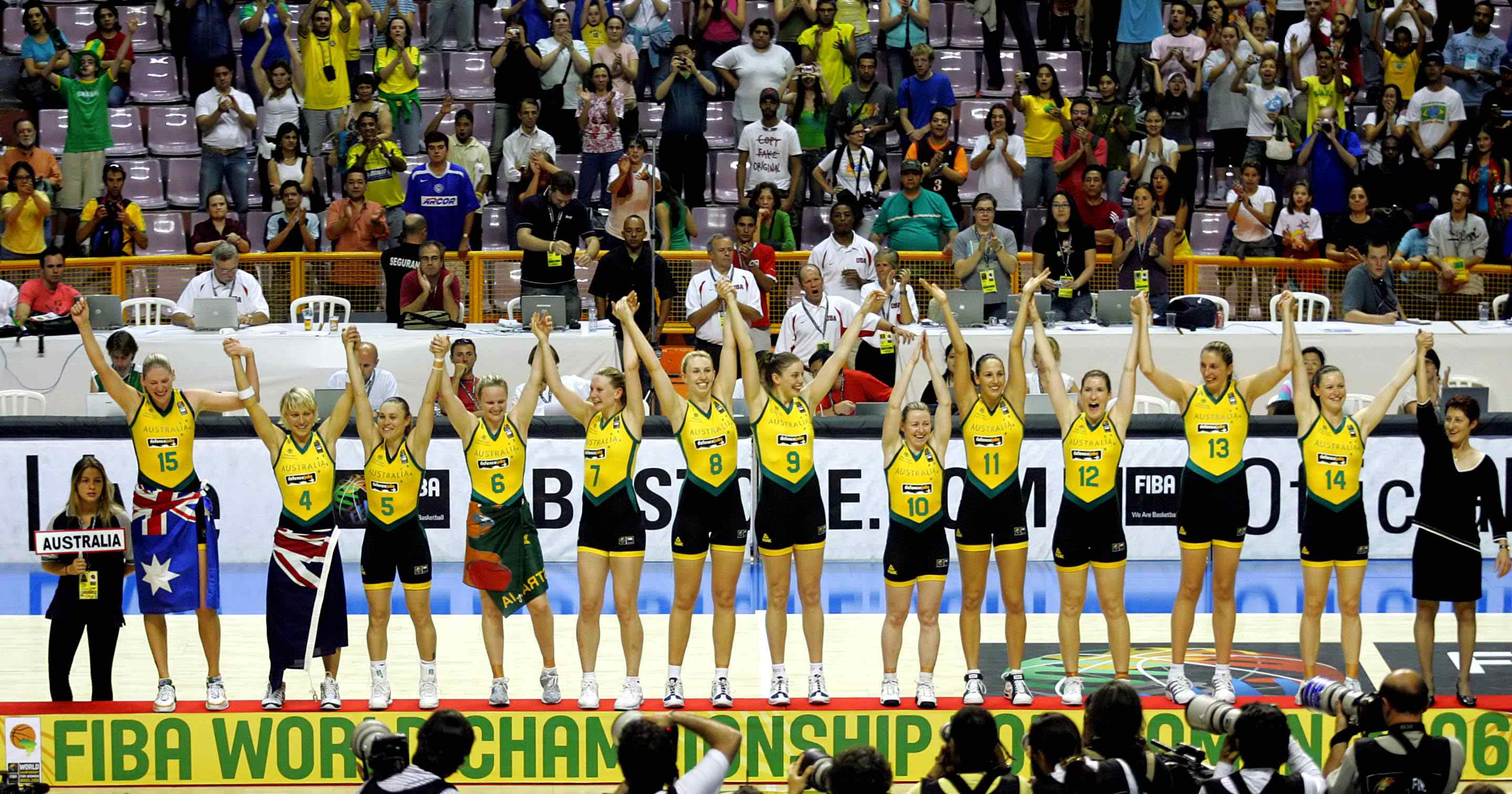
The National team celebrating after being awarded the gold medals for winning the 2006 FIBA World Championship for Women in basketball.

Established in 1981, the Women's National Basketball League (WNBL) is one of the longest-standing professional women's basketball leagues globally. It has been crucial in nurturing talent and promoting women's basketball in Australia. The Australian women's basketball team, the Opals, won the 2006 FIBA World Championship for Women, showcasing the league's role in developing world-class talent.

Originally known as the ANZ Championship, which began in 2008 with teams from both Australia and New Zealand, it was the world's premier netball league until 2016. Following the withdrawal of the Australian teams, the Suncorp Super Netball was established as Australia's top netball league. The Suncorp Super Netball has become a leading competition in netball, celebrated for its high standard of play and substantial media presence.

Australian women's tennis has produced several prominent players, including notable players such as Margaret Court, who holds a record 24 Grand Slam singles titles, and Evonne Goolagong Cawley, a two-time Wimbledon champion. More recently, players such as Ashleigh Barty, a former world No. 1 and 2019 French Open champion, and Sam Stosur, the 2011 U.S. Open winner, have represented Australia in international competition. The Australian Open, a major Grand Slam event held annually in Melbourne, showcases top local talent. Australian women compete on the global WTA Tour, with support from Tennis Australia through youth development and high-performance programs.

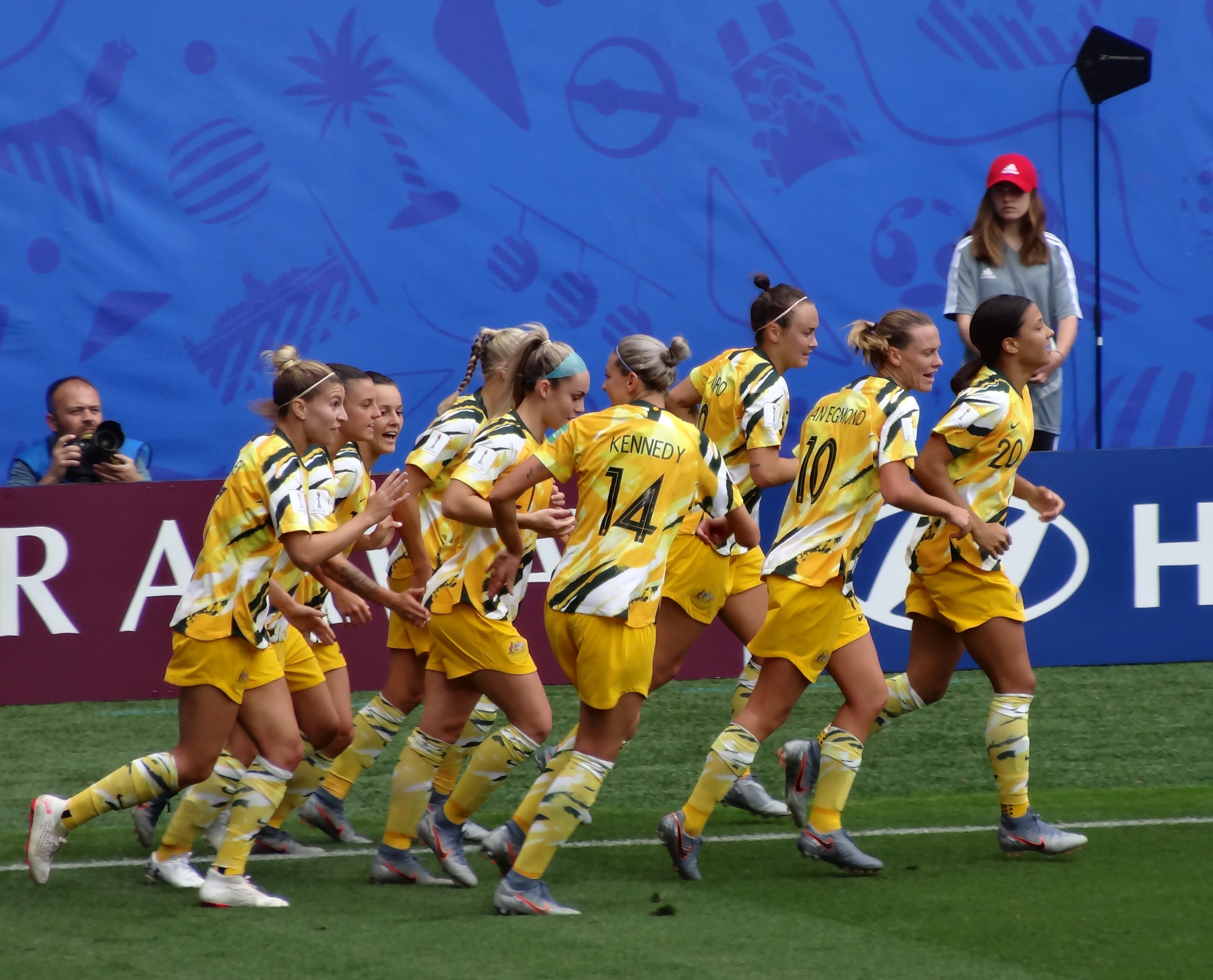
Australia during the Women's World Cup 2019.

The Australian Institute of Sport has played a pivotal role in supporting women's golf through various programs designed to develop and promote female golfers. Women's golf in Australia has a strong tradition and continues to thrive, driven by prominent players such as Karrie Webb and Hannah Green. The country features a robust professional scene with key tournaments like the Women's Australian Open and a significant presence on the LPGA Tour.

Founded in 2008, the A-League Women has become Australia's premier professional soccer league for women. It has grown in prominence and competitiveness, contributing to the development of female soccer players and boosting the sport's visibility. Record Attendance: The 2023–24 season of the A-League Women recorded the highest attendance for any women's sport in Australian history, with a total attendance of 284,551. In September 2015, the Australia women's national soccer team (nicknamed the Matildas) announced that it had canceled a sold-out tour of the United States due to a dispute with Football Federation Australia (FFA; known since November 2020 as Football Australia) over their pay. Their salary was below minimum wage levels in Australia. The Matildas requested health care, maternity leave, and improved travel arrangements, as well as an increased salary. The players also said that their low salaries forced them to remain living at home, since they could not afford rent, and their strict training schedule meant they were unable to get another job.

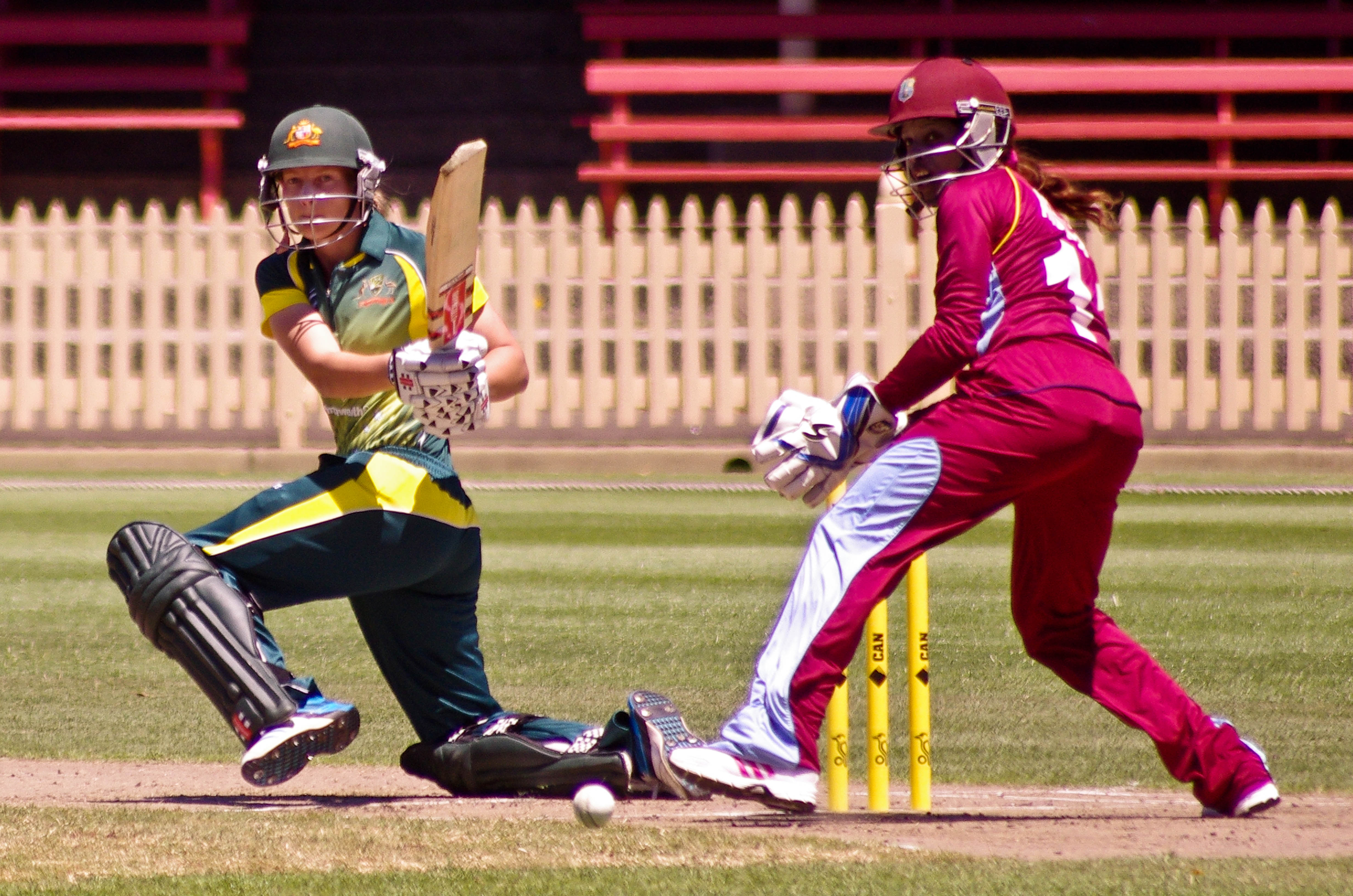
Australian batter Meg Lanning plays a sweep shot while Merissa Aguilleira of the West Indies keeps wicket during the 2014 West Indies tour of Australia at the North Sydney Oval.

In September 2017, a new pay deal was announced for players in Australia's national soccer league, the W-League. The deal included an increase in wages, an increase in the salary cap, improved medical standards, and a formal maternity policy. Some commentators have attributed the success of the new W-League deal to the Matildas' boycott in 2015. In November 2019, the FFA announced a new contract with the union Professional Footballers Australia (PFA) in which the Matildas and the men's national team (the Caltex Socceroos) will receive equal shares of total player revenue and equal resources. In addition, the guaranteed minimum salary for a player on the Matildas will increase as a result of this deal. In December 2020, Football Australia announced that it had unbundled the Australian Professional Leagues (APL) from the rest of the governing body, giving APL control of operational, commercial, and marketing for the top level of women's, men's, and youth soccer in the country. APL soon rebranded the W-League as A-League Women.

In 2017, Cricket Australia and the Australian Cricketers Association made significant strides by providing equal pay to male and female cricketers, underscoring the growing recognition and support for women in the sport. Impact and Development. The final match between Indian national women's cricket team and Australia set a record attendance (86,174) for a Women's sports match in Australia and second highest globally.

== Great Britain ==
=== Association Football ===
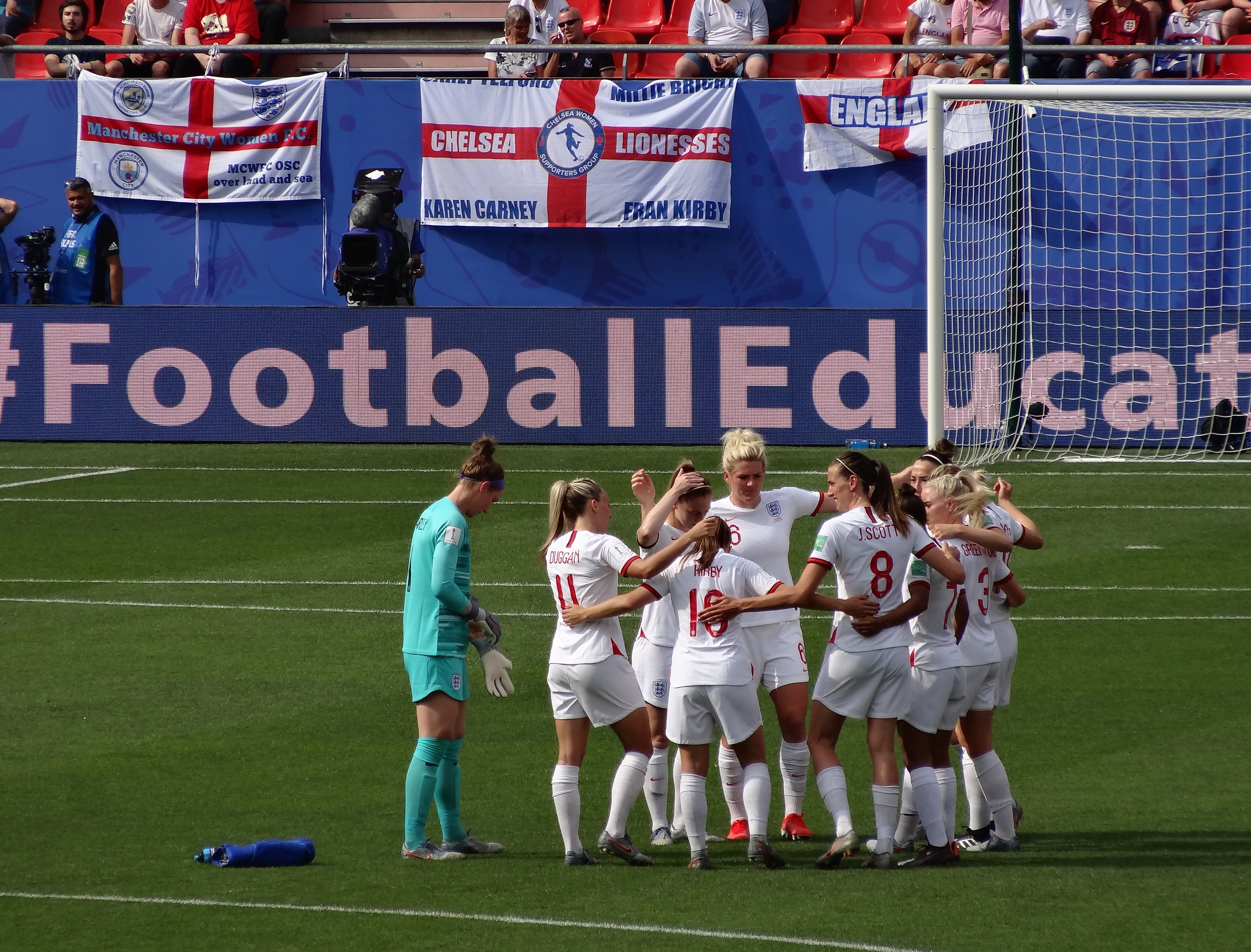
England women's national football team during 2019 Women's World Cup.

Women's football has experienced significant growth in recent years. The FA Women's Super League (WSL), established in 2010, represents the top tier of women's football in England and has emerged as a leading competition in the sport. Prominent teams in the league include Arsenal, Chelsea, and Manchester City, each of which has played a substantial role in the league's development and popularity. The league has been professional, since the 2018–19 season. The major women's clubs competing are affiliates of male club counterparts, usually bearing the same names with the acronyms LFC or WFC. Since the success of the England women's national football team winning the UEFA Women's Championship in 2022, the league has enjoyed enormous popular success in England, with many matches shown on public television channels, and played in the male clubs' stadia. In 2024, Arsenal W.F.C. sold out the 60,000 capacity Emirates Stadium in North London for two successive matches, and is playing all home games there in the 2024-25 season.

=== Others ===
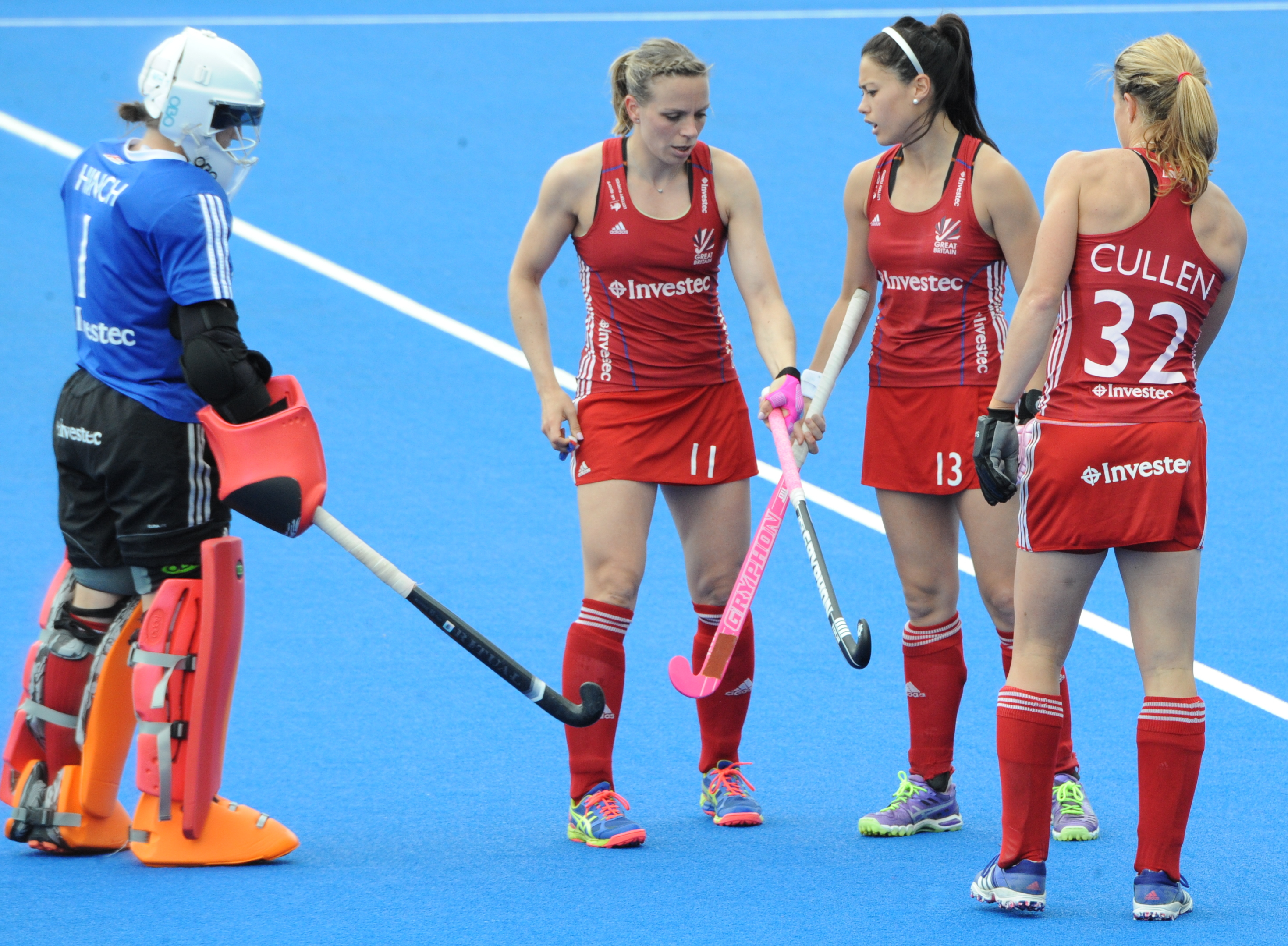
Great Britain's field hockey players with their goal-keeper during their 2016 Champions Trophy match versus Argentina.

Semi-professional teams exist in women's rugby union and cricket. Common to most Europe sports, promotion and relegation is used in the leagues (a model not used by either the WNBA or NWSL). Women's cricket has also advanced markedly, highlighted by the creation of the Women's Cricket Super League (WCSL), which has contributed to the sport's visibility and development. The England women's cricket team has achieved notable success on the international stage, including winning the Women's Cricket World Cup, which underscores the team's prominence in the sport. The Premiership Women's Rugby is recognized as the leading professional league for women's rugby in England. The England women's rugby team, known as the Red Roses, has attained considerable success in international rugby competitions, further enhancing the profile of women's rugby. The Netball Superleague, established in 2005, is the premier netball league in Great Britain. It includes teams from various regions across the country and has played a significant role in increasing the sport's popularity and competitive standards.

England has hosted Wimbledon, one of four annual major tennis tournaments, since 1884. British female tennis players have gained international acclaim, with Emma Raducanu emerging as a prominent figure. Raducanu's victory at the 2021 US Open is a notable achievement that has garnered widespread recognition and highlights the growing presence of British women in international tennis. Notably successful female English tennis players include: Dorothea Lambert Chambers, Blanche Bingley Hillyard, Lottie Dod, Charlotte Cooper Sterry, Phoebe Holcroft Watson, Ann Haydon-Jones, and Virginia Wade. The most notably successful active English female tennis player is Emma Raducanu.

The Ladies European Tour is Europe's leading women's professional golf tour and formed as the WPGA in 1978. Over the last 33 years, the tour has developed into a truly international organization, and in 2011 operated 28 golf tournaments in 19 different countries worldwide. British female golfers have made significant contributions to the sport, both domestically and internationally. Key figures include Laura Davies, a member of the World Golf Hall of Fame with numerous titles on the Ladies Professional Golf Association (LPGA) Tour and four major championships. Charley Hull, who turned professional at 17, has achieved multiple victories on the Ladies European Tour (LET) and the LPGA Tour, including the 2016 Kingsmill Championship. Georgia Hall won the 2018 Women's British Open, a major championship in women's golf.

== Canada ==
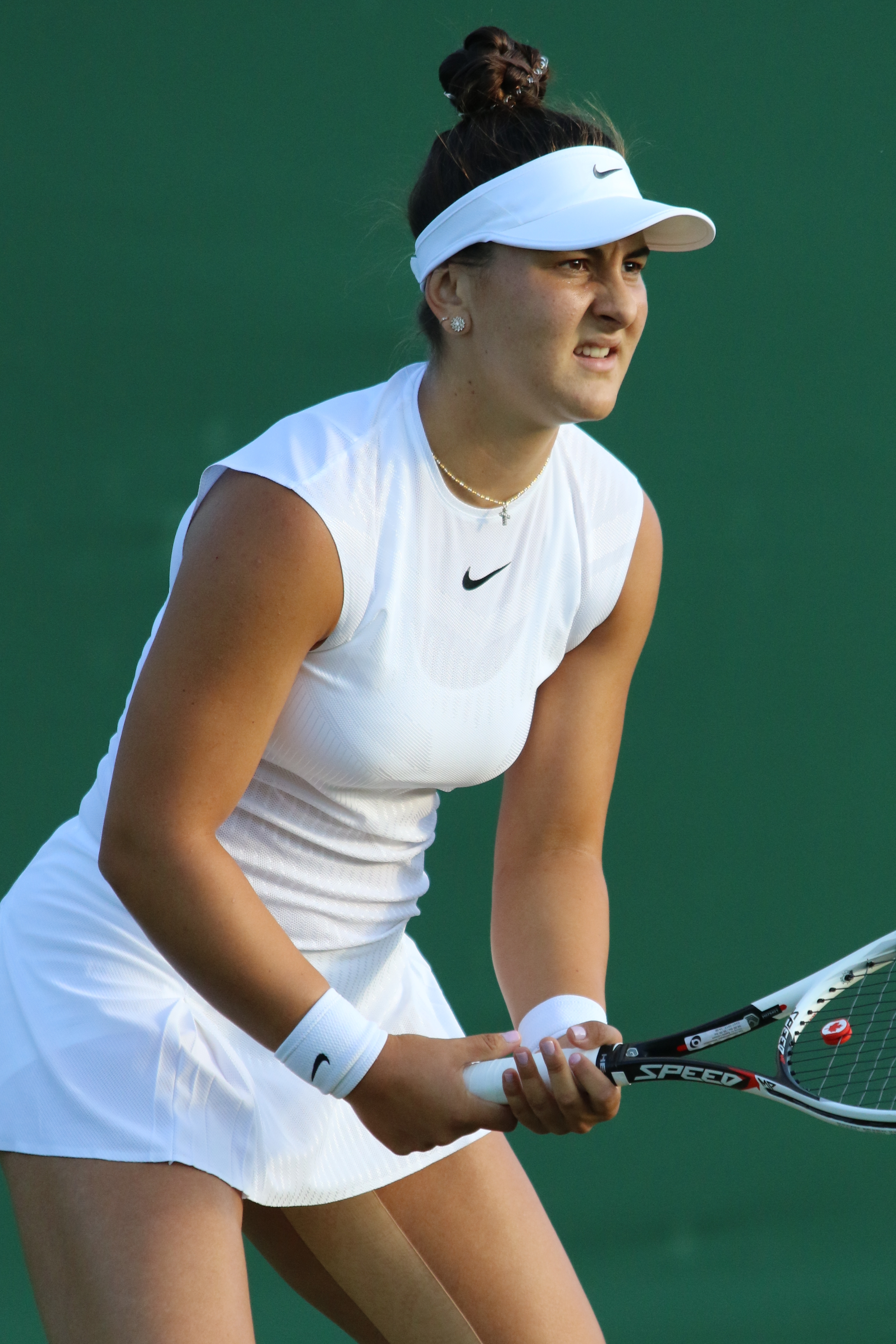
Bianca Andreescu the first Canadian to win a major singles title.

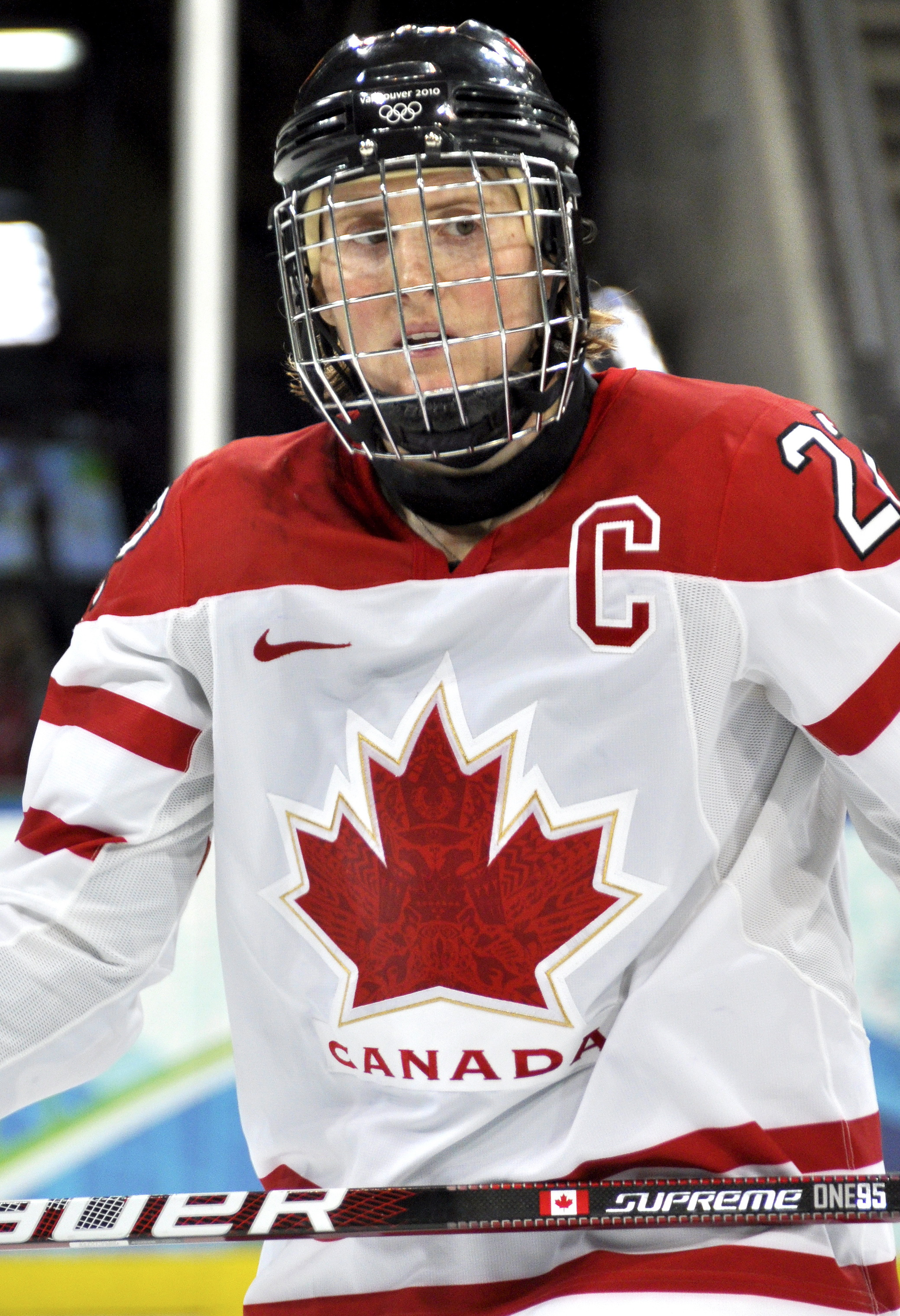
Hayley Wickenheiser ice hockey player who won four Olympic gold medals and one silver with the national team and was inducted into the Hockey Hall of Fame in 2019.

A number of professional sports opportunities for female athletes exist in Canada in both individual and team sports. For a time, Canada had a professional women's ice hockey league called the Canadian Women's Hockey League (CWHL), but the league collapsed in 2019. Canadian professional tennis player Bianca Andreescu won the 2019 US Open. The Toronto Tempo is a planned professional basketball team that will be based in Toronto, Ontario. Once established, it will join the Women's National Basketball Association (WNBA), the leading professional women's basketball league in the United States and will compete against other teams in the league.

In the late 2010s, increasing interest in women's soccer resulted in calls to consider the creation of a professional women's soccer league. The Northern Super League is an upcoming Division I professional women's soccer league in Canada. It is owned and managed by Project 8 Sports, Inc., an organization co-founded by Diana Matheson, a former player for the Canada women's national soccer team, who also serves as the league's chief executive officer.

=== Ice hockey ===
The first organized women's ice hockey leagues started in Canada, as did the first-ever attempt at launching a women's professional league in the 1990s. The Canadian Women's Hockey League (CWHL) had a relatively long period of existence with the last incarnation of the league beginning operations in 2007 then collapsing in 2019. The CWHL had many names: In the late 90s and early 2000s, it was the National Women's Hockey League (NWHL). Many of the CWHL's early players were culled from the NWHL after its demise in 2007. At the time, owners were losing money and unable to forge a cohesive plan for how to move the league forward. The prospect of not having a professional league for women left the world's top players with nowhere to play.

In the summer of 2007, a new initiative launched a player-run league. Along with players Kathleen Kauth, Kim McCullough, Sami Jo Small, Jennifer Botterill, Lisa-Marie Breton and a group of business people, they formed the Canadian Women's Hockey League (CWHL), following the example of the National Lacrosse League. The result was a non-profit organization that favoured a centralized league over the old ownership model. The new league would cover all basic travel, ice rental, uniforms and equipment costs for the league's 6 teams across Eastern Canada. Until the 2010–11 season, the players in the league had to pay over $1,000 each to play ice hockey. While these elite female hockey players hoped to make a living exclusively from playing someday, everyone involved in the CWHL from players to staff worked "pro bono", and worked regular jobs and careers, some of whom were National Team athletes.

The entire CWHL collapsed in 2019, with the league stating that the cause was an unsustainable business model. Established in 2023, the Professional Women's Hockey League (PWHL) is designed to offer high-level competition in women's ice hockey. The league has rapidly developed a notable presence in Canada, reflecting a commitment to advancing the sport and providing professional opportunities for female hockey players.

=== Golf ===
Canada has produced several prominent female golfers, such as Brooke Henderson, who has been a top performer on the LPGA Tour with multiple tournament wins. The country has a strong reputation in women's golf, supported by a robust development system and successful players.

== France ==
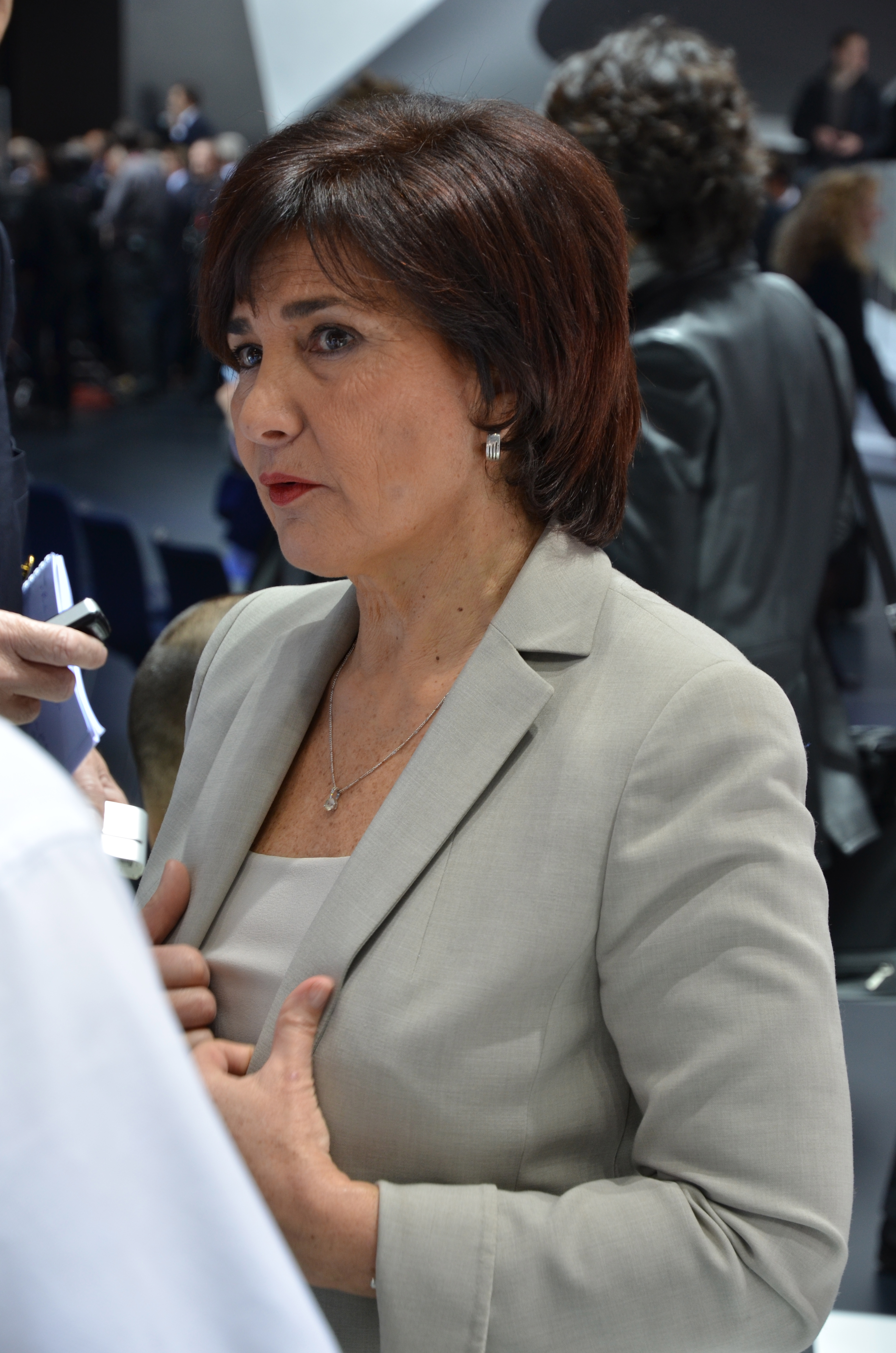
Michele Mouton motorsports, particularly in rallying.

In France, women's professional sports have been steadily growing in popularity and recognition. Key sports like football (soccer), basketball, rugby, handball, and tennis feature competitive leagues and successful national teams. The Division 1 Féminine in football, LFB in basketball, Top 16 Féminin in rugby, and LFH Division 1 in handball showcase top talent and competitive matches. There's been a concerted effort to promote gender equality in sports, leading to increased media coverage, sponsorships, and support for female athletes across various disciplines. Players include Jessy Trémoulière, Sandrine Gruda, Camille Muffat, Jeannie Longo, Marine Boyer, Marie Dorin Habert. Charline Picon, and Carole Péon.

France has hosted the French Open, one of four annual major tennis tournaments, since 1897. Notably successful female French tennis players include: Suzanne Lenglen, Simonne Mathieu, Françoise Dürr, Gail Chanfreau, Mary Pierce, Amélie Mauresmo, Marion Bartoli, and Alizé Cornet.

Notably successful active female French tennis players include: Caroline Garcia, Kristina Mladenovic, and Fiona Ferro.

== Sweden ==
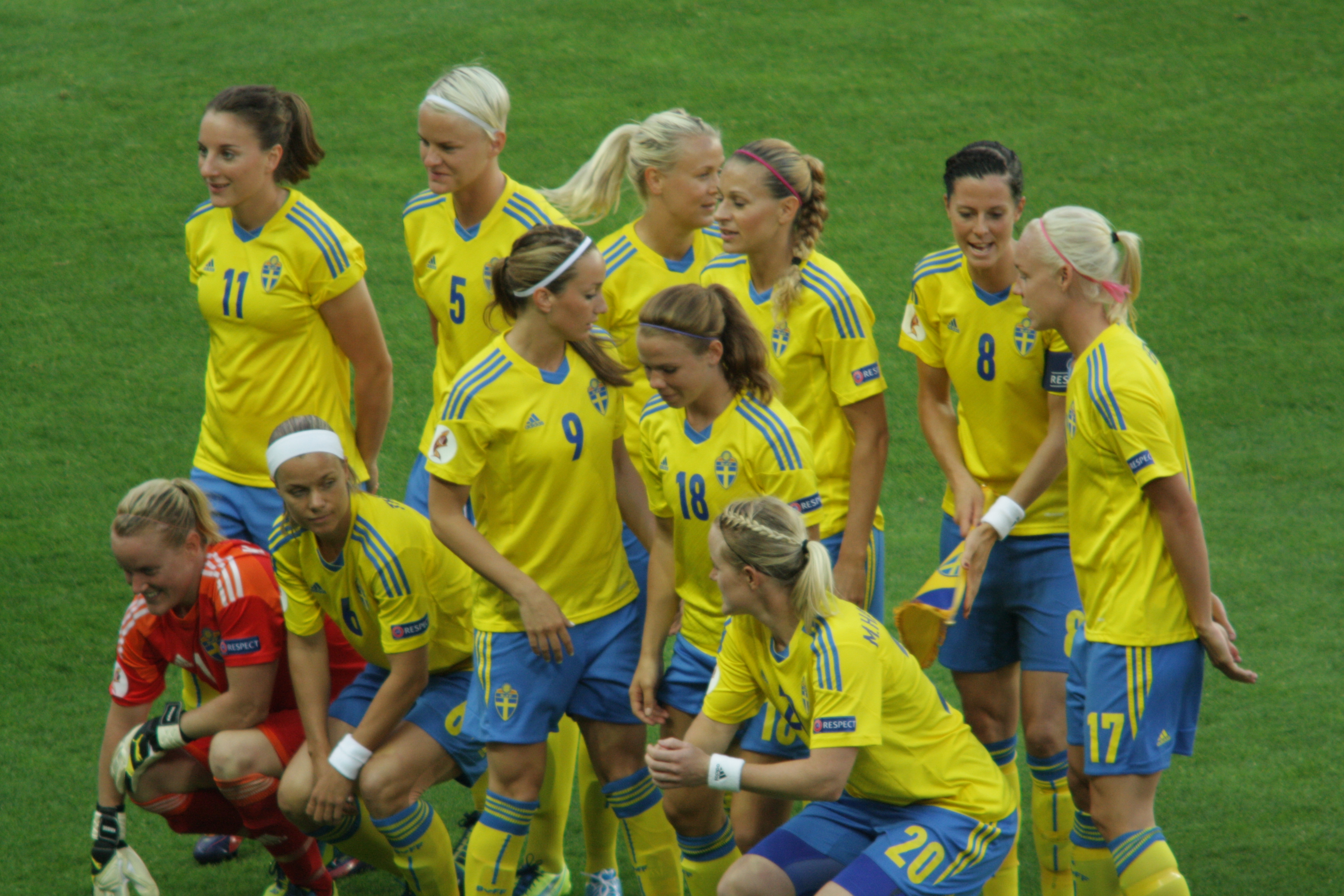
Sweden's women's soccer team has consistently performed at a high level internationally, with notable achievements including reaching the final of the 2003 FIFA Women's World Cup and earning multiple Olympic medals.

=== Football ===
In the early twentieth century, the first ever women's football team was created in Sweden. About a year later, in Stockholm, the first match between two female-only teams took place. Between the years of 1910 and 1920, women played against 'gubblag', or old-boy sides, and any money the match made went back to the facility they were using or to charities. Also, in the span of those 10 years, society worked hard to make sure women's football was taken more seriously and that more matches were planned between women's teams. Soon after, a women's football league was created in Umeå, a coastal city in the northern part of Sweden.

Established in 1966, Öxabäck IF women's football team was the first team that worked hard to create all women football teams and to receive recognition as the first 'modern' women's football team. Two years later, women started to receive recognition in other sports in Sweden.

== Denmark ==
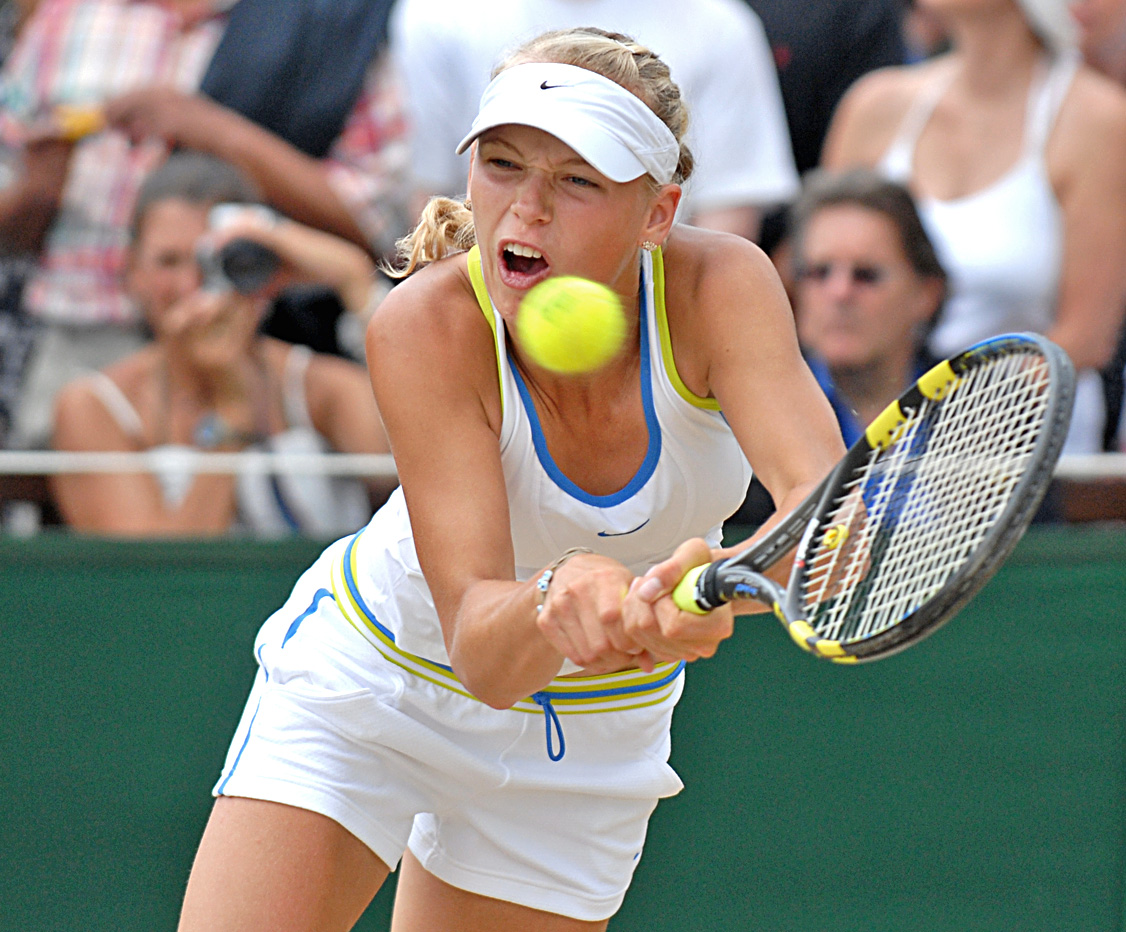
Caroline Wozniacki's consistency, determination, and achievements on the tennis court have made her a prominent figure in Danish sports history.

In Denmark, women were allowed to participate in football in a football club or in school. In 1959, the manager of a sports club, Allan Andersen, noticed that many of the women's sports activities were not receiving the funding needed. Allan Andersen saw student nurses at a nearby hospital playing handball and invited them to play football during halftime. A journalist from Femina went to cover the match, and not long after, the magazine was in a general meeting with those women establishing an association for women's football. A year later, Femina stopped providing financial support to the association. The women created their own union, Dansk Kvindelig Fodbold Union (the Danish Women's Football Union, or DKFU). DKFU was responsible for coordinating tournaments and establishing the rules, until the association was included in the DBU.

The Danish women's team handball league, Damehåndboldligaen, is all-pro and internationally considered the strongest and most well paid in the world. Leading clubs are GOG, Slagelse, Aalborg DH and Viborg HK.

The Danish women's football league, Elitedivisionen is semi-professional. Leading clubs are Fortuna Hjorring and HEI.

Danish professional tennis player Caroline Wozniacki, who ended a three-year retirement in 2023, was the number one female singles' tennis player in the world for 71 weeks (9th all-time) and won the 2018 Australian Open.

== Cyprus ==
Women's organized professional sport in Cyprus began relatively recently compared to men's sports. The Cypriot Women's First Division was founded in 1998 and the Cyprus Women's National Football Team was established in 2002. The national team was the first to receive the FIFAPRO Player Voice Award in 2020 for their protest for equal compensation and conditions as the men's team.

== Eastern Europe ==
=== Tennis ===
==== Belarus ====
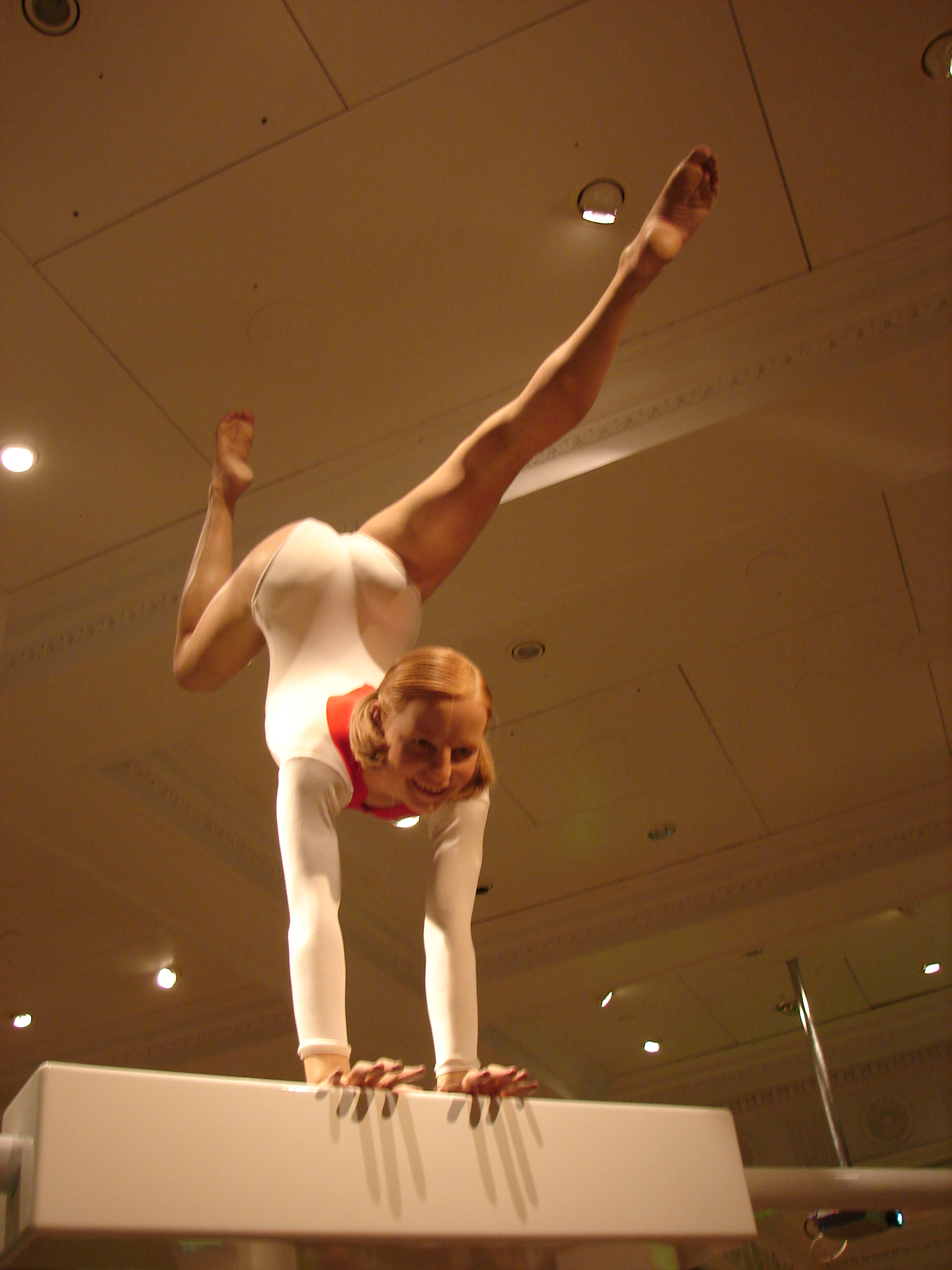
Olga Korbut gymnast who won multiple Olympic gold medals and captured the world's attention with her daring and innovative gymnastics techniques in the 1970s.

Notably successful Belarusian female tennis players include: Natasha Zvereva (represented the Soviet Union, and later Belarus), Victoria Azarenka, and Aryna Sabalenka. Azarenka and Sabalenka are still active.

==== Croatia ====
Notably successful Croatian female tennis players include: Mirjana Lučić-Baroni and Iva Majoli.

==== Czech Republic ====
Notably successful Czech female tennis players include: Martina Navratilova (represented Czechoslovakia for first win, subsequently represented the United States after being stripped of citizenship), Helena Suková (represented Czechoslovakia and later the Czech Republic), Jana Novotná (represented Czechoslovakia and later the Czech Republic), Hana Mandlíková (Czech-born, represented Czechoslovakia and later Australia), Andrea Hlaváčková (represented Czech Republic), Lucie Hradecká (represented Czech Republic), Lucie Šafářová (represented Czech Republic), and Petra Kvitová (represented Czech Republic).

Notably successful active Czech female tennis players include: Barbora Strýcová, Barbora Krejčíková, Kateřina Siniaková, Petra Kvitová, Karolína Plíšková, and Markéta Vondroušová.

==== Hungary ====
Notably successful Hungarian female tennis players include: Zsuzsa Körmöczy (represented Hungary), Andrea Temesvári (represented Hungary), and Monica Seles (ethnically Hungarian, represented Yugoslavia and later the United States).

==== Latvia ====
Notably successful Latvian female tennis players include: Larisa Savchenko-Neiland (represented the Soviet Union, Ukraine, and Latvia) and Jeļena Ostapenko. Ostapenko is still active.

==== Poland ====
Notably successful Polish female tennis players include the retired Jadwiga Jędrzejowska and Agnieszka Radwańska as well as the currently active Iga Świątek.

==== Romania ====
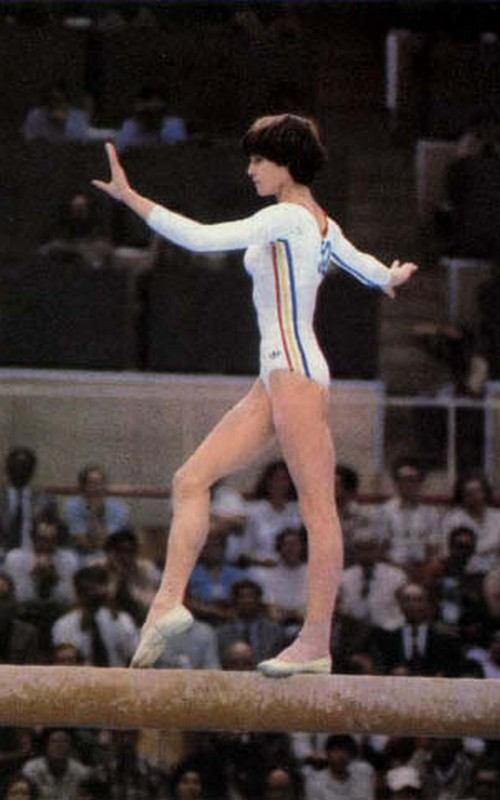
Nadia Comăneci in 1976. At the age of 14, Comăneci was the first gymnast to be awarded a perfect score of 10.0 at the Olympic Games.

Notably successful Romanian female tennis players include: Virginia Ruzici and Simona Halep. Halep is still active.

==== Russia ====
Notably successful Russian female tennis players include: Anna Kournikova, Svetlana Kuznetsova, Vera Zvonareva, Elena Vesnina, Ekaterina Makarova, Yaroslava Shvedova (represented Kazakhstan, not Russia), and Maria Sharapova.

==== Serbia ====
Notably successful Serbian female tennis players include: Ana Ivanovic and Jelena Janković.

==== Slovenia ====
Notably successful Slovenian female tennis players include: Mima Jaušovec (represented Yugoslavia) and Katarina Srebotnik.

==== Ukraine ====
Notably successful Ukrainian female tennis players include: Alona Bondarenko and Kateryna Bondarenko.

== Latin America ==
=== Association football ===
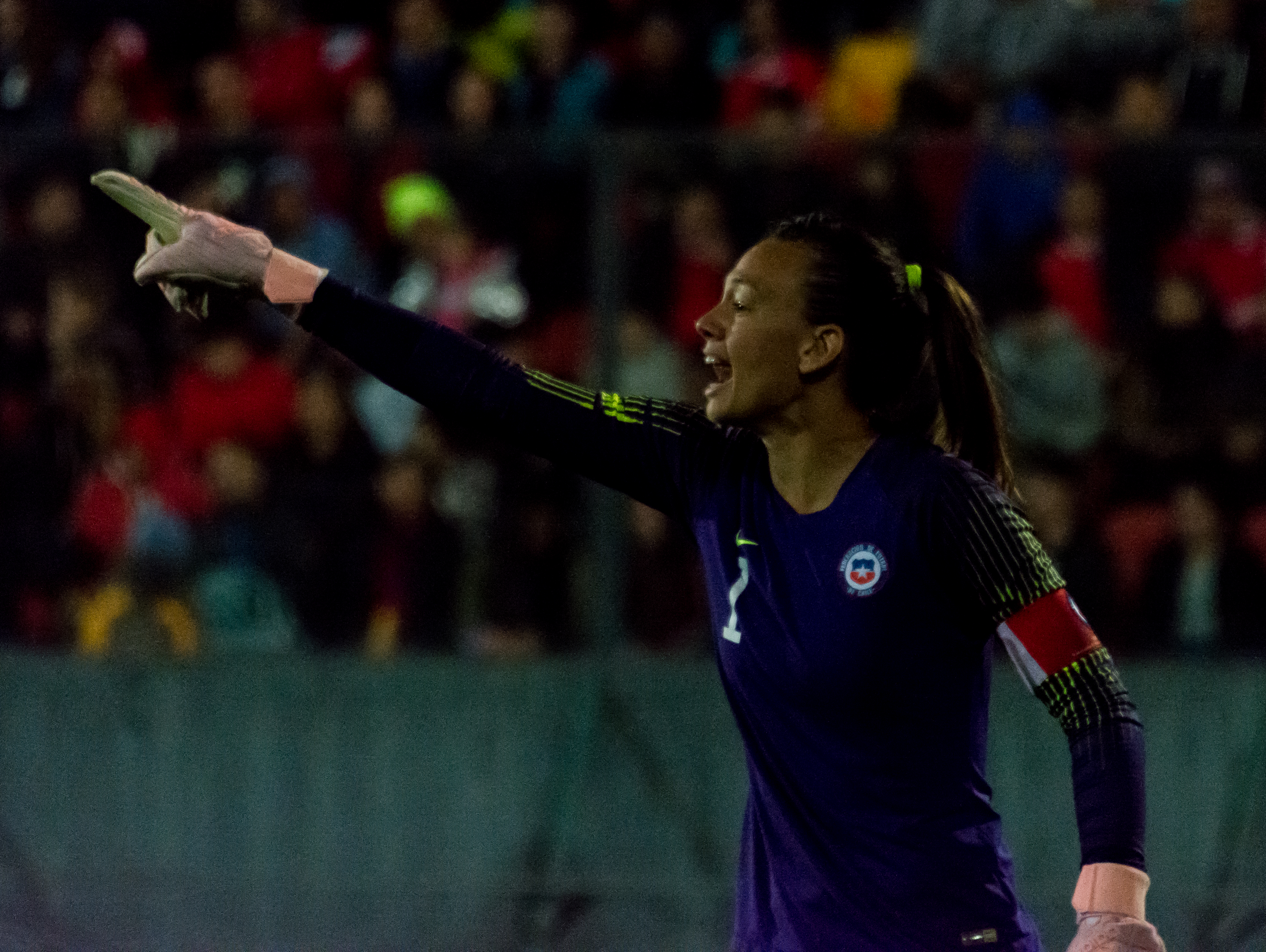
Christiane Endler with Chile in 2018 during a match against South Africa

Women's football in Latin America is overseen by two organizations. South America is mostly overseen by the South American Football Association, or CONMEBOL, while Mexico, Central America, and the Spanish-speaking Caribbean are overseen by CONCACAF. Both organizations have categories for male and female players. CONMEBOL also organizes the Copa Libertadores Femenina competition for club teams, while CONCACAF currently has no women's club competition. The men's Copa Libertadores was founded in 1959, and the women's competition in 2009. The 2018 competition was hosted by Brazil, and included teams from all 10 CONMEBOL members (Argentina, Bolivia, Brazil, Chile, Colombia, Ecuador, Paraguay, Peru, Uruguay and Venezuela). The Colombian team Atlético Huila won the championship game 5–3 in a penalty shootout against the Brazilian team Santos. CONMEBOL now requires that all clubs that enter the men's Copa Libertadores field competitive women's sides, a policy that took effect with the 2019 men's edition.

The only Latin American countries that have had women's tournaments for more than 20 years are Argentina, Uruguay and Brazil. Ecuador, Chile, Mexico and Colombia are relatively new to implementing professional women's football leagues, and it is still growing in El Salvador, Nicaragua, Costa Rica and Panama, who have had small semiprofessional championships.

=== Basketball ===
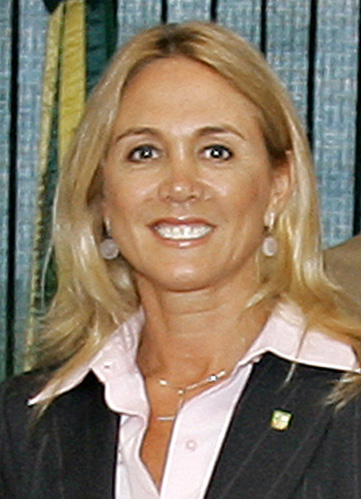
Hortencia Marcari Brazilian basketball pivotal figure in elevating the profile of women's basketball in Latin America.

Professional women's basketball is slowly gaining more attention in South America. Many Latin American countries have professional women's leagues, but the only country to obtain success internationally is Brazil. The FIBA Women's Basketball World Cup is a world basketball tournament held every four years for women's basketball national teams. Since the tournament's creation in 1953, Brazil is the only South American team that has won a title. This championship was part of a golden era for women's basketball in Brazil in the 1990s and early 2000s, led by Hortencia Marcari and Maria Paula Gonçalves da Silva. In this era, Brazil also won silver and bronze, respectively, in the 1996 and 2000 Olympics.

In the 2018 FIBA Women's Basketball World Cup, Argentina and Puerto Rico were the only two Latin American teams to qualify. However, they placed last among the participating teams.

=== Rugby ===
Rugby in Latin America has grown exponentially ever since Rugby Sevens was added to the Olympics in 2016. The prominent tournament for women's rugby in Latin America is CONSUR Women's 7s. This tournament began in 2004 hosted by Venezuela, and is now a qualifier for several international tournaments such as the Pan American Games and the Olympic Games.

In the 2018 Rugby World Cup Sevens in San Francisco, the only two Latin American women's teams that qualified were Brazil and Mexico. Both teams lost in the Round of 16.

=== Tennis ===
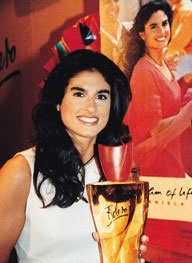
Gabriela Sabatini, tennis player

There have been several successful Latin American professional women's tennis players.

Anita Lizana of Chile was the first Latin American to be ranked No. 1 in the world in women's singles, as well as the first Latin American, male or female, to win a Grand Slam title.

Brazilian player Maria Bueno saw success in singles and doubles play in the 1950s and 1960s, winning 19 Grand Slam titles across singles, doubles, and mixed doubles.

Mexican doubles pair Rosie Reyes Darmon and Yola Ramírez Ochoa won the 1958 French Open.

Fiorella Bonicelli of Uruguay, a doubles player, won the 1976 French Open with her French partner.

Gabriela Sabatini of Argentina has won a Grand Slam title as well as 27 singles championships and 14 doubles championships. She is also a 3-time semi-finalist in the Australian Open, 5-time in Wimbledon and 3-time in the U.S. Open. Argentinian doubles player Paola Suárez won 8 Grand Slam doubles titles in the 2000s. Fellow Argentinian doubles player Gisela Dulko won the 2011 Australian Open.

More recently, Spanish-Venezuelan singles player Garbiñe Muguruza represented Spain until her retirement in 2024; she won the singles titles at the 2016 French Open and 2017 Wimbledon and was world number one for four weeks.

=== Volleyball ===
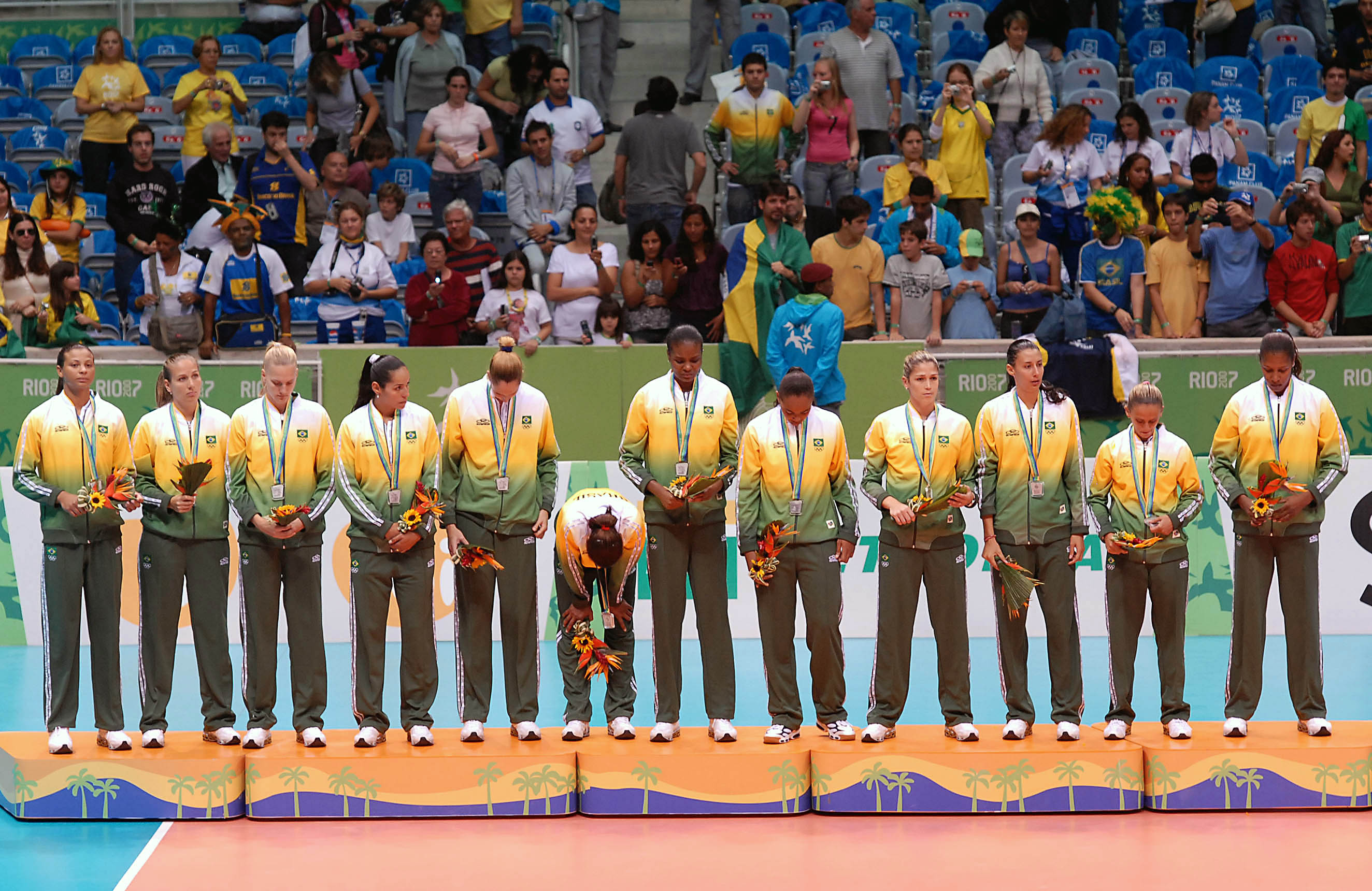
Brazil women's national volleyball team, 2007.

Volleyball is one of the most popular sports for women in Latin America, particularly in Peru. The Peruvian Women's National Team was very successful in the 1980s, winning a silver medal at the 1988 Olympics in South Korea. The team was led by Natalia Málaga, Gabriela Pérez del Solar, and especially Cecilia Tait, who is considered one of the greatest athletes in Peru's history. The top volleyball competition in Peru is Liga Nacional Superior de Vóleibol (LNSV). It features twelve women's teams and nine men's teams. Winners of the competition qualify for the South American Volleyball Club Championship. Today, however, many other Latin American countries have had more international success in the sport.

At the 2018 Women's World Championship in Japan, several Latin American teams competed, including Argentina, Mexico, Cuba, Trinidad & Tobago, Brazil, The Dominican Republic, and Puerto Rico. None of these teams made it past the second round.

Many Latin American countries are currently very competitive internationally in women's volleyball. Brazil is ranked #4 in the world, with the Dominican Republic at #10, Argentina at #11, Puerto Rico at #13, Mexico at #21, Cuba at #25, and Peru at #27.

== Motorsports ==
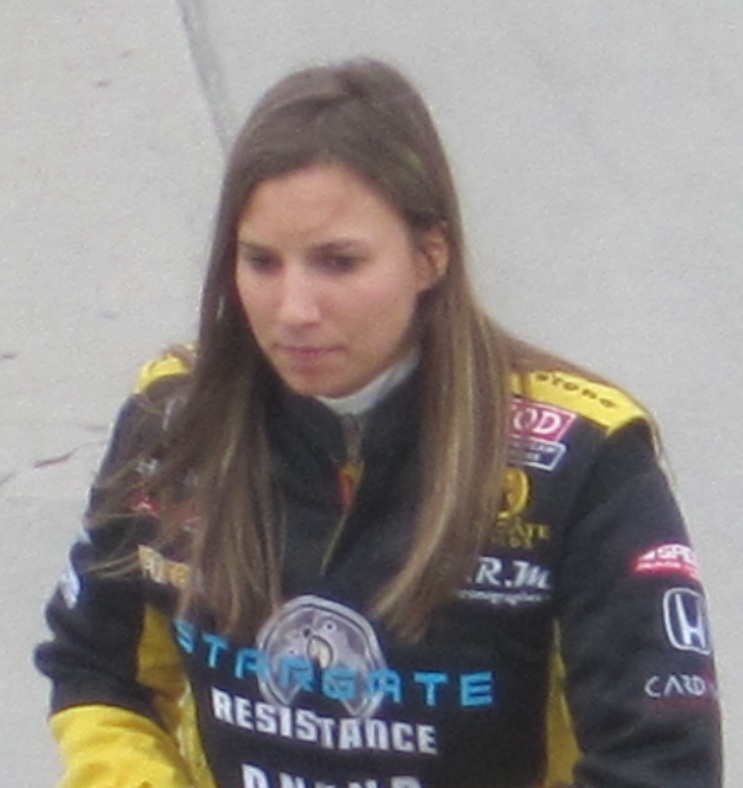
Simona de Silvestro at the Indianapolis Motor Speedway in 2010

Five women competed in Formula One: Maria Teresa de Filippis (1958–1959), Lella Lombardi (1974–1976), Divina Galica (1976 and 1978), Desiré Wilson (1980) and Giovanna Amati (1992), totaling 29 entries and 15 starts. Lombardi had a best result of sixth at the 1975 Spanish Grand Prix, where she was awarded half a World Championship point.

The Deutsche Tourenwagen Masters has had four women drivers: Katherine Legge, Susie Stoddart, Rahel Frey and Vanina Ickx. Stoddart scored two 7th race finishes and a 13th place in the standings in 2010. In the Deutsche Tourenwagen Meisterschaft, Ellen Lohr scored a win.

In sports car racing, Desiré Wilson also won two races of the World Sportscar Championship, and Odette Siko resulted fourth overall at the 1932 24 Hours of Le Mans.

In rallying, Michèle Mouton got four wins and nine podiums at the World Rally Championship, resulting runner-up in 1982. Meanwhile, Jutta Kleinschmidt won the 2001 Dakar Rally.

In off-road motorcycling, Laia Sanz scored twelve women's trial world championships and three X Games endurocross gold medals.

In 2019 the W Series an all female racing championship in which the drivers can progress to Formula 1, Formula 2 and Formula 3 as a full-time or replacement driver. The series is free to enter but you must be picked by the series as one of the 18 best female drivers in the world. The series has 10 races at 8 tracks that do Formula 1 races. Races are 30 minutes long and 1 extra lap after the time limit expires. Follows typical Formula 1 rules.

== Top earning sportswomen ==
For several years, Forbes magazine has published a list of the top 10 earning female athletes, supplementing a similar list of the top 100 earners among athletes regardless of sex or gender. The 2021 list was the first to be based on earnings during the named calendar year; previous lists were based on a fiscal year that ended on June 30 of the year of publication.

2023	Nationality	Name	Earnings (USD)	Sport
1	Poland	Iga Świątek	$23.9 million	Tennis
2	China	Eileen Gu	$22.1 million	Freestyle skiing
3	United States	Coco Gauff	$21.7 million	Tennis
4	United Kingdom	Emma Raducanu	$15.2 million	Tennis
5	Japan	Naomi Osaka	$15 million	Tennis
6	Belarus	Aryna Sabalenka	$14.7 million	Tennis
7	United States	Jessica Pegula	$12.5 million	Tennis
8	United States	Venus Williams	$12.2 million	Tennis
9	Kazakhstan	Elena Rybakina	$9.5 million	Tennis
10	Canada	Leylah Fernandez	$8.8 million	Tennis

Forbes list: 2023

2021	Nationality	Name	Earnings (USD)	Sport
1	Japan	Naomi Osaka	$57.3 million	Tennis
2	United States	Serena Williams	$45.9 million	Tennis
3	United States	Venus Williams	$11.3 million	Tennis
4	United States	Simone Biles	$10.1 million	Gymnastics
5	Spain	Garbiñe Muguruza	$8.8 million	Tennis
6	South Korea	Ko Jin-young	$7.5 million	Golf
7	India	P. V. Sindhu	$7.2 million	Badminton
8	Australia	Ashleigh Barty	$6.9 million	Tennis
9	United States	Nelly Korda	$5.9 million	Golf
10	United States	Candace Parker	$5.7 million	Basketball

Forbes list: 2021

== Gender inequality across sports ==
=== Gender coaching gaps ===
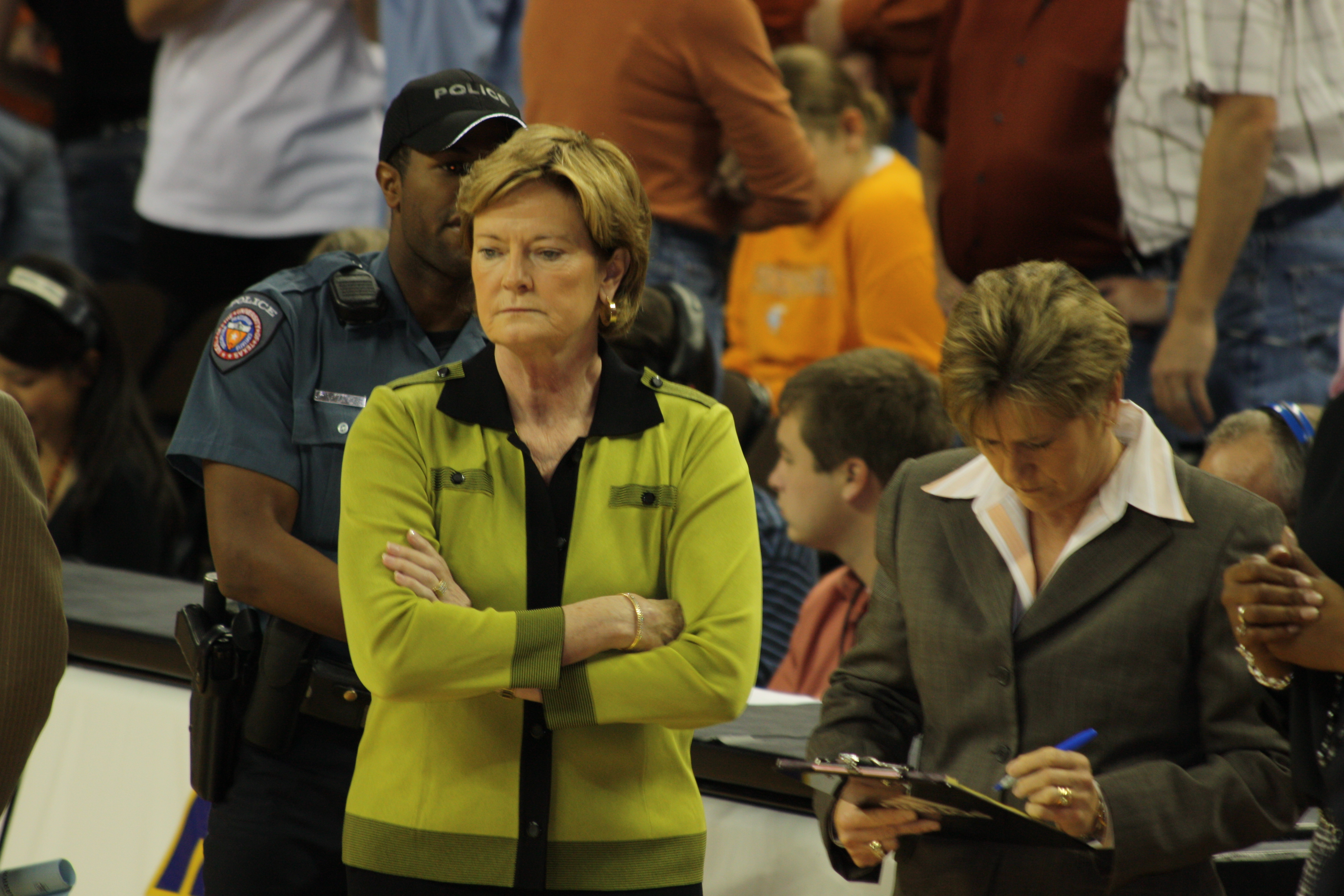
Pat Summitt is widely recognized as one of the most influential coaches in the history of sports.

Globally, coaching positions across all sports face a gender gap. Men hold more coaching positions than women, regardless of the gender of the sport, although the gender of the team's head coach has been shown not to impact team or individual player performance. In American college basketball for women, women make up 43.4% of coaching positions at the NCAA Division I level as of 2018. At the NCAA Division I level for men, women do not hold any coaching positions. Through 2018 in the WNBA, men held 29 head coach positions and women held 27. In the NBA, a woman has never held a head coach position, and only 11 women held full-time assistant positions in the 2019–20 season. In other countries, gender representation statistics in coaching are similar or even more male-dominated. For example, in Norway, women made up 14% of elite level coaching positions in 2018.

These representation gaps reflect traditional societal gender stereotypes. One explanation for this is the stereotypical association of sports with masculinity: in coaching, traditionally expected masculine attributes such as dominance, aggressiveness, and independence are considered to be more desirable in head coaches when compared with traditionally expected feminine attributes such as affection, sympathy, and timidity. As of 2018, outside of basketball, fewer than 5 percent of men's teams are coached by women, and they are primarily at smaller universities.

=== Gender wage gap ===
==== Coaches ====
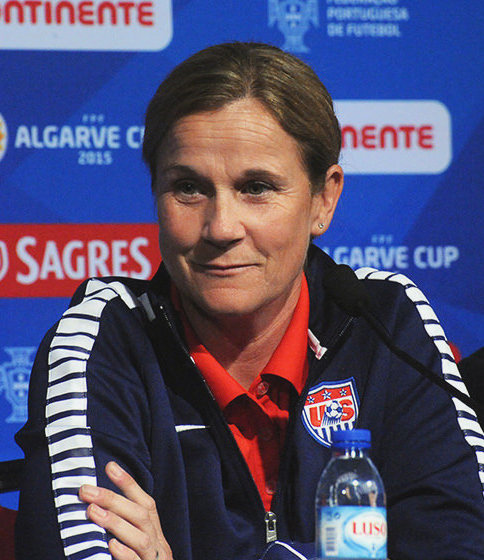
Jill Ellis coached the United States women's national soccer team to two FIFA Women's World Cup titles in 2015 and 2019.

Salaries are consistent between female and male coaches within individual sports programs. The coaching wage gap exists when comparing female sports programs with male programs. Coaches for women's programs are paid less than coaches for men's programs. This has frequently been rationalized by the fact that women's programs are not as financially successful, do not generate similar media coverage, and do not draw similar crowds as their male counterparts. In 2010 NCAA Division I basketball, the median salary for the head coach position in women's programs was $171,600 and the median salary for the head coach position for men was $329,000. In 2018, the median salary for women's programs was increased to $690,000 and for men's programs to $2.7 million. The gap between men's and women's NCAA Division I programs was particularly significant among the highest paid coaches. As of 2018, Mike Krzyzewski at Duke University was the highest earning coach for men's basketball. He earned $9.0 million and had won 5 national championships at that point. The highest-paid female coach in 2018 was Kim Mulkey of Baylor University at $1.85 million, who had won two national titles at that point; she would win a third the following season. At the same time, the highest-paid coach of a women's team was Geno Auriemma of the University of Connecticut, who had won 11 national championships, a record for any D-I basketball coach. He earned $2.4 million at the time. This overall pay disparity among men's and women's athletic programs exists across every sport and varies based on revenue and media coverage.

=== Coverage ===
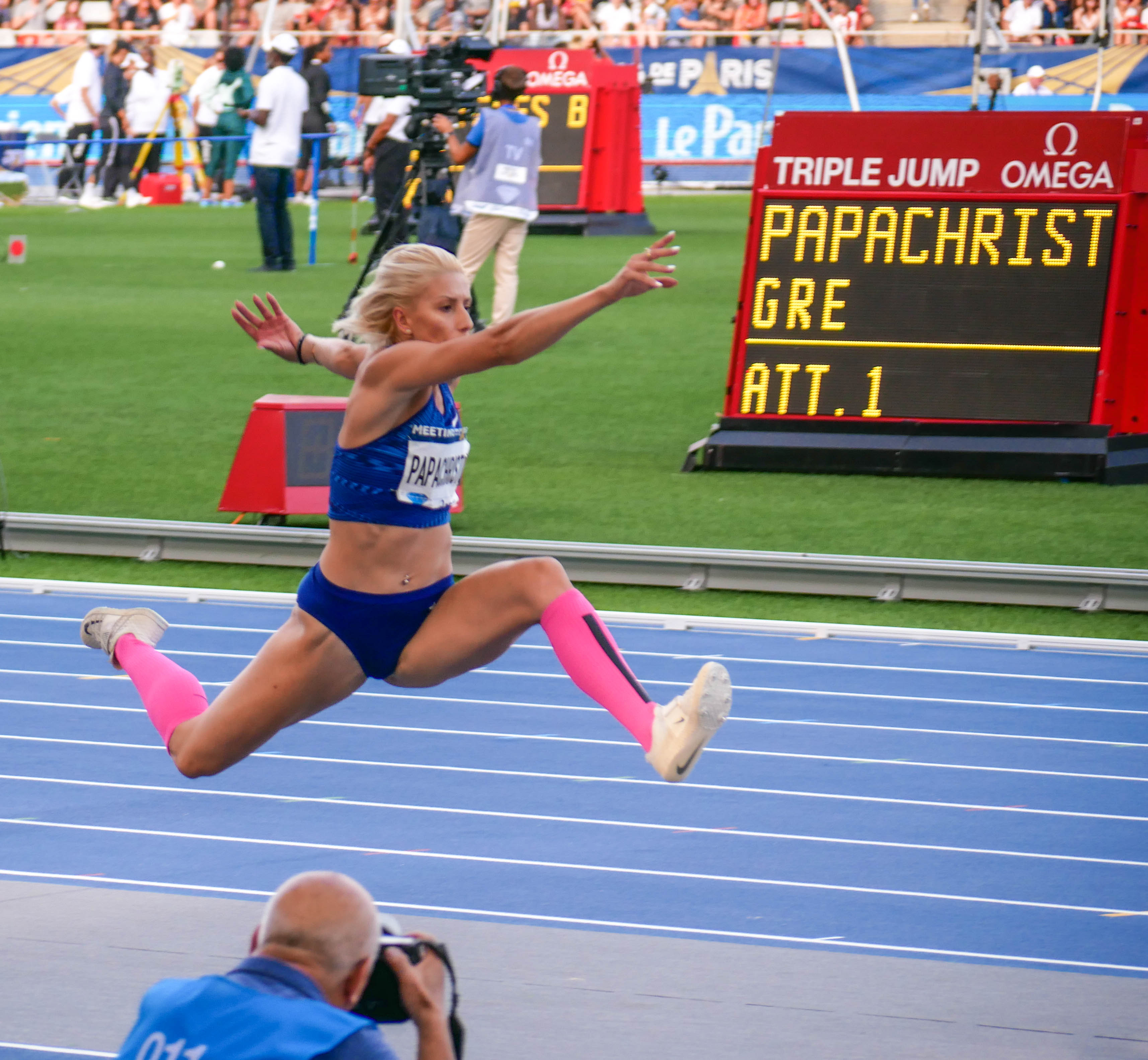
Greek athlete Paraskevi Papachristou jumps at 2019 Meeting de Paris, while a photographer clicks.

It was not until the Civil Rights Act of 1964 and the passing of Title IX in 1972 that women were given the respect they deserved. The Civil Rights Act of 1964 prohibits discrimination on the basis of race, color, religion, sex or national origin. Provisions of this civil rights act forbade discrimination on the basis of sex as well as race in hiring, promoting, and firing. Although there has been great advancement of women's sports and female athletes, the potential for strong women to be positive role models and the portrayal of these athletes in the media has been subjected to objectification and invisibility compared to male athletes and male sports. Women's sports are, on average, underrepresented in comparison to male sports. Exclusion and dismissal of female athletes are common themes that are found during research of media representation. Sports media tends to represent female athletes as women first and athletes second. The media's lack of coverage for women's sports clearly reflects society's view of women, in that they are less than their male counterparts, and that the cultural norm of society is that men are considered the strong, athletic ones who dominate the sports world.

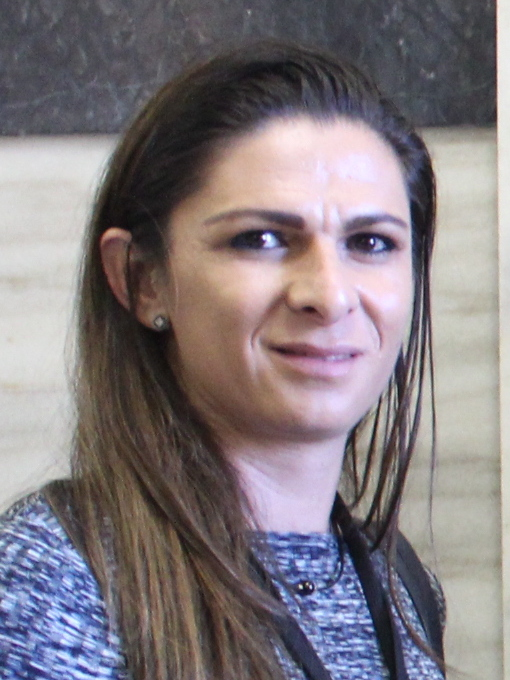
Ana Guevara sprinting events, particularly the 400 meters. She competed at the highest levels of international track and field competitions, including the Olympic Games and World Championships.

One percent of network television coverage included women's athletics in 2014, and ESPN's SportsCenter featured women two percent of the time. Even when female sports are televised or receive media attention, the athletes are often objectified or their personal lives are brought into question. Coverage of women in sports is often dominated by references to appearance, age, or family life, whereas men are depicted as powerful, independent, dominating, and valued as athletes. Every day, men's sports stories dominate the 10 most popular sports websites. Women's sports in the U.S. receive only 4 percent of sports media coverage, according to the Tucker Center for Research on Girls & Women in Sports at the University of Minnesota. In a study of televised sports news, ongoing since 1989, three LA-based stations dedicated, on average, 3.2 percent of their sports coverage to women's sports, according to the 2014 results.

Sports coverage is powerful in shaping norms and stereotypes about gender. Media has the ability to challenge these norms, promoting a balanced coverage of men's and women's sports and a fair portrayal of sportspeople – irrespective of gender. On International Women's Day in 2020, CBC announced its commitment to provide gender equal coverage on its original content. Chris Wilson, the executive director of CBC Sports and Olympics, said, "And we're going to make sure that when you look across our entire CBC sports ecosystem over the course of a year, that we're covering as much women's sport as we're covering men."

Cheryl Cooky, an associate professor of American studies and women's, gender, and sexuality studies at Purdue University says, "The interest for women's sports is there. It's just a problem of how leagues and teams are marketed. We don't see the same amount of coverage. We don't see the same investment in women's sports."

Record breaking growth has been documented in the early 2020s; with the National Women's Soccer League viewership having increased by 500%, the WNBA's by 68%, the 2021 Women's College World Series best-of-three-game championship series had 1.84 million viewers which was more than an NHL playoff game the same day. Social media has further encouraged greater interest. Despite this as of 2019 95% of all sports TV coverage still focused on men's sports mainly but with stronger cultural biases limiting coverage is especially still noted in the NCAA & US soccer organizations.

==== Basketball ====
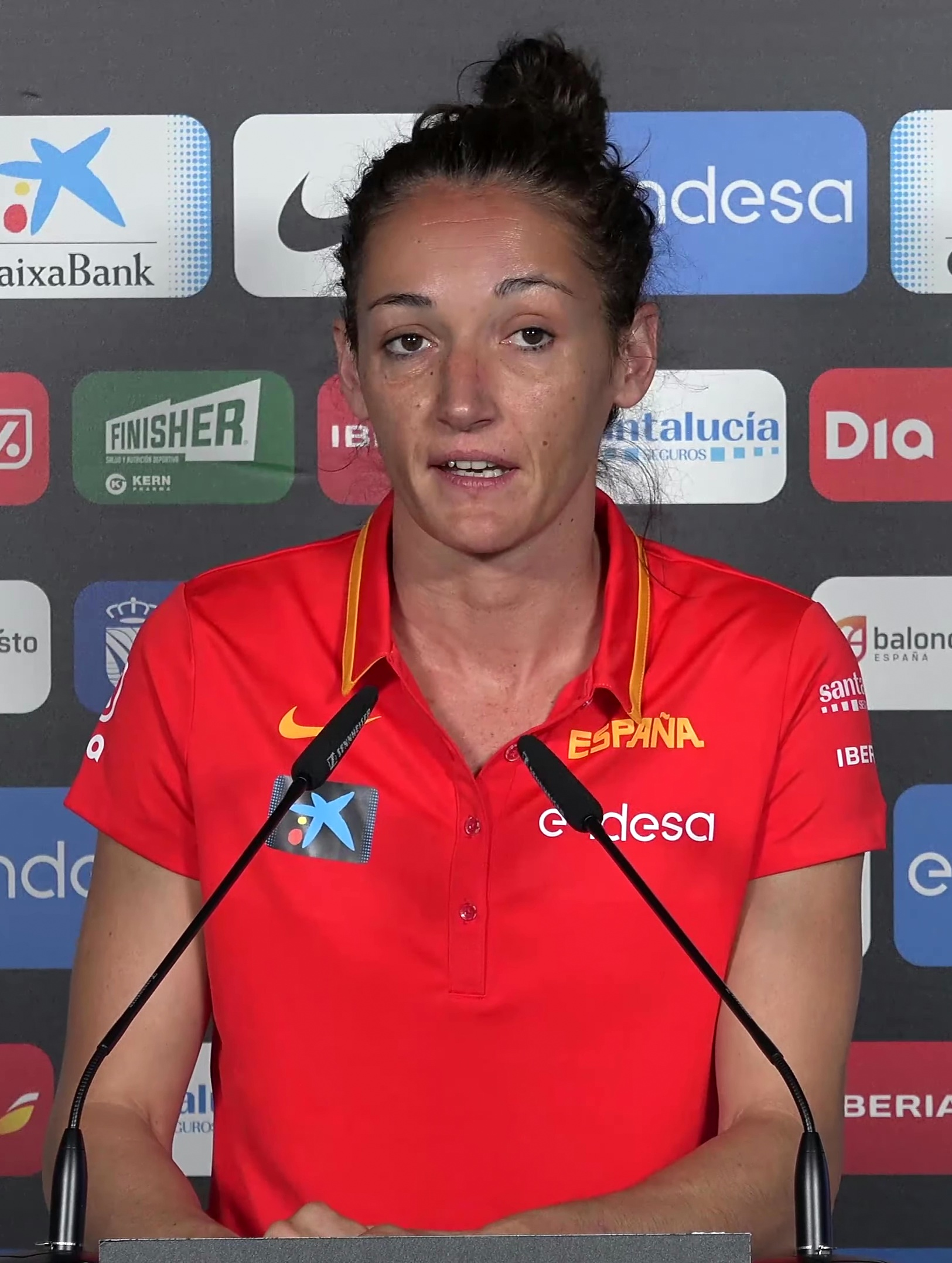
Laia Palau known for her playmaking ability. She has competed in multiple Olympics and EuroBasket tournaments.

The National Collegiate Athletic Association has built its trademarked "March Madness" phrase into one of the most powerful brands in sports. It's plastered on the courts, arenas and broadcasts for the lucrative NCAA men's basketball tournament—and absent from the women's tournament. The 2021 NCAA Basketball Championships were an eye opener for many viewers. The issues relating to gender inequality came to light when Stanford performance coach, Ali Kershner, posted side-by-side photos of the difference in weight rooms constructed for the female and male athletes, which later went viral on Twitter. Oregon player Sedona Prince also posted a TikTok video, exposing the disparities at the NCAA Women's Basketball Championships. Once brought to the attention of social media users, the issue was quickly handled by brands to ensure gender equality was met. To further express the gender inequality in the media at the tournament, the NCAA did not provide interview transcription services until the Women's Sweet 16, but provided these services for all post-game press conferences at the Men's Tournament. Although the NCAA was unable to tell news outlets how to cover the tournament, their website was male-dominated. A reader stated they "had to scroll past 26 stories or videos about the men's basketball tournament before reaching the first story or video about the women's tournament." On Twitter, the use of hashtags for the NCAA Tournament was far different for the women versus its male counterparts. The handle @MarchMadness, along with #MarchMadness is used specifically for the men's tournament only, while women's basketball content is found using @NCAAwbb and gendered hashtags including #ncaaW and #WFinalFour. Although the trademarked "March Madness" is allowed to be used for both men and women's basketball, the NCAA used it only for the men's tournament until 2022.

During the COVID-19 pandemic, there was a large increase in coverage for the Women's National Basketball Association (WNBA). There were nearly 90 nationally televised games, and viewership numbers were up, with a 68 per cent increase in regular season average viewership across all networks. The big increase in viewership was due in part to ESPN Network and CBS Television Network. The exposure to women's basketball was a step in the right direction, and social media interactions continue to grow, as there was a 30 per cent increase in cross-platform average action for social posts. In replacement of in-person viewership, the WNBA formed a "Tap to Cheer" application which resulted in an 85 per cent increase in average weekly mobile application downloads, totaling 109 million taps.

==== Ice Hockey ====
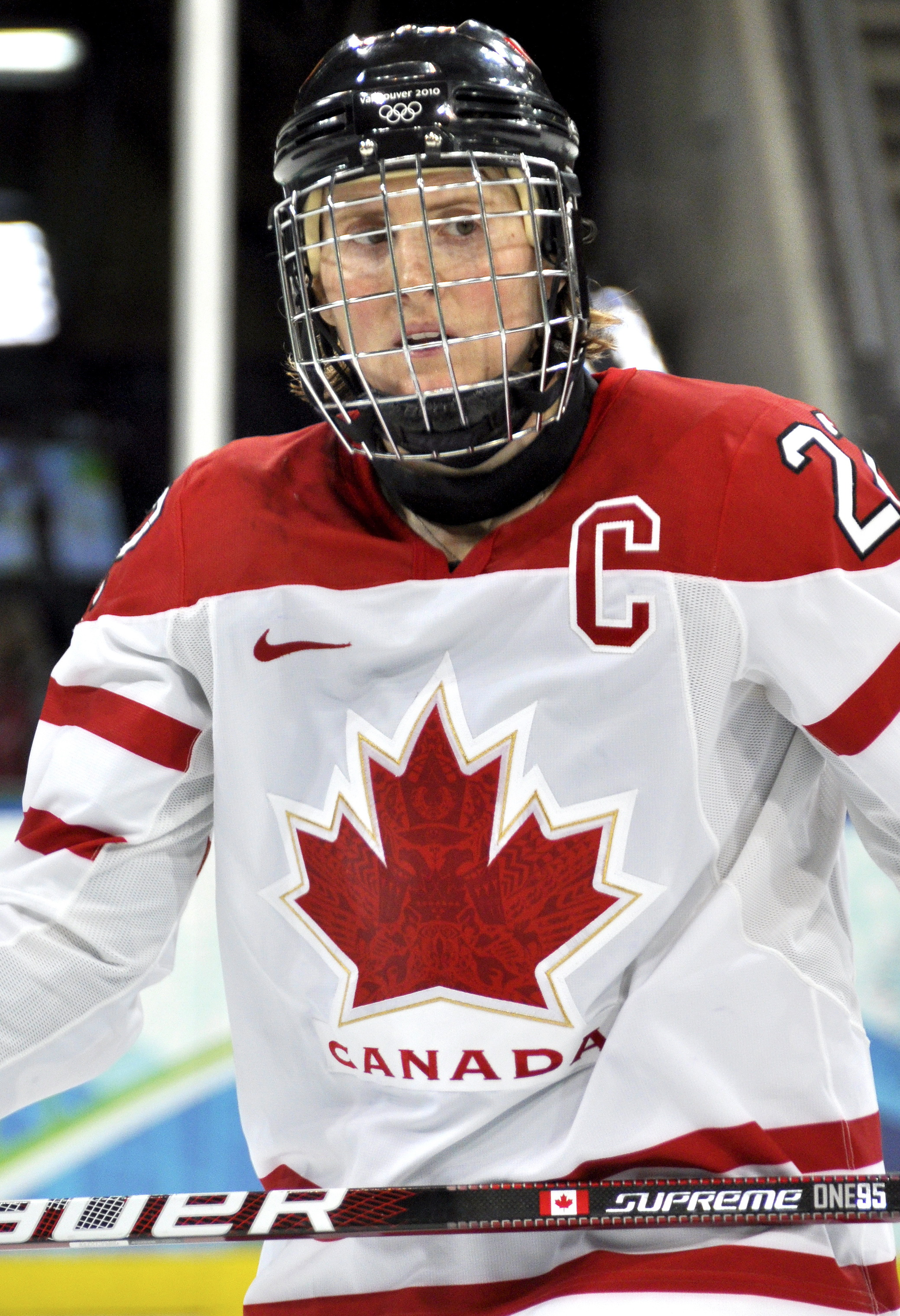
Hayley Wickenheiser ice hockey player and four-time Olympic gold medalist, widely revered for her skill.

The National Women's Hockey League, since renamed the Premier Hockey Federation, saw history being made in the 2020–2021 season as both of the two Isobel Cup semifinals on March 26 and the final on March 27 were broadcast on NBCSN during the Saturday night prime time for Americans and streamed on Twitch for international viewers. For the first time in the sport's history, every professional women's hockey game in North America that year had either been broadcast on live television or had a sponsored, high-quality stream. In addition to the Twitch and NBCSN feeds for the NWHL, February 2021 saw Sportsnet, NBC, and CBC showing at least one of the Professional Women's Hockey Players Association's four games that season. Although exciting for the women's hockey game, it is hard to forget that only two years ago, the NWHL and PWHPA struggled to secure consistent airtime.

Before this season, the Olympics was the only way fans were able to watch women's hockey when not in person. The 2018 Olympic gold medal game between Canada and the United States drew 3.7 million viewers to NBCSN and NBC streaming platforms. Some other championships and events, such as the 2020 Elite Women's 3-on-3 game at the NHL All-Star game, were aired on CBC and Sportsnet, and the Women's World Championships was broadcast on TSN for Canadian viewers. It was not until 2016 that these games were made available in the United States on the NHL Network.

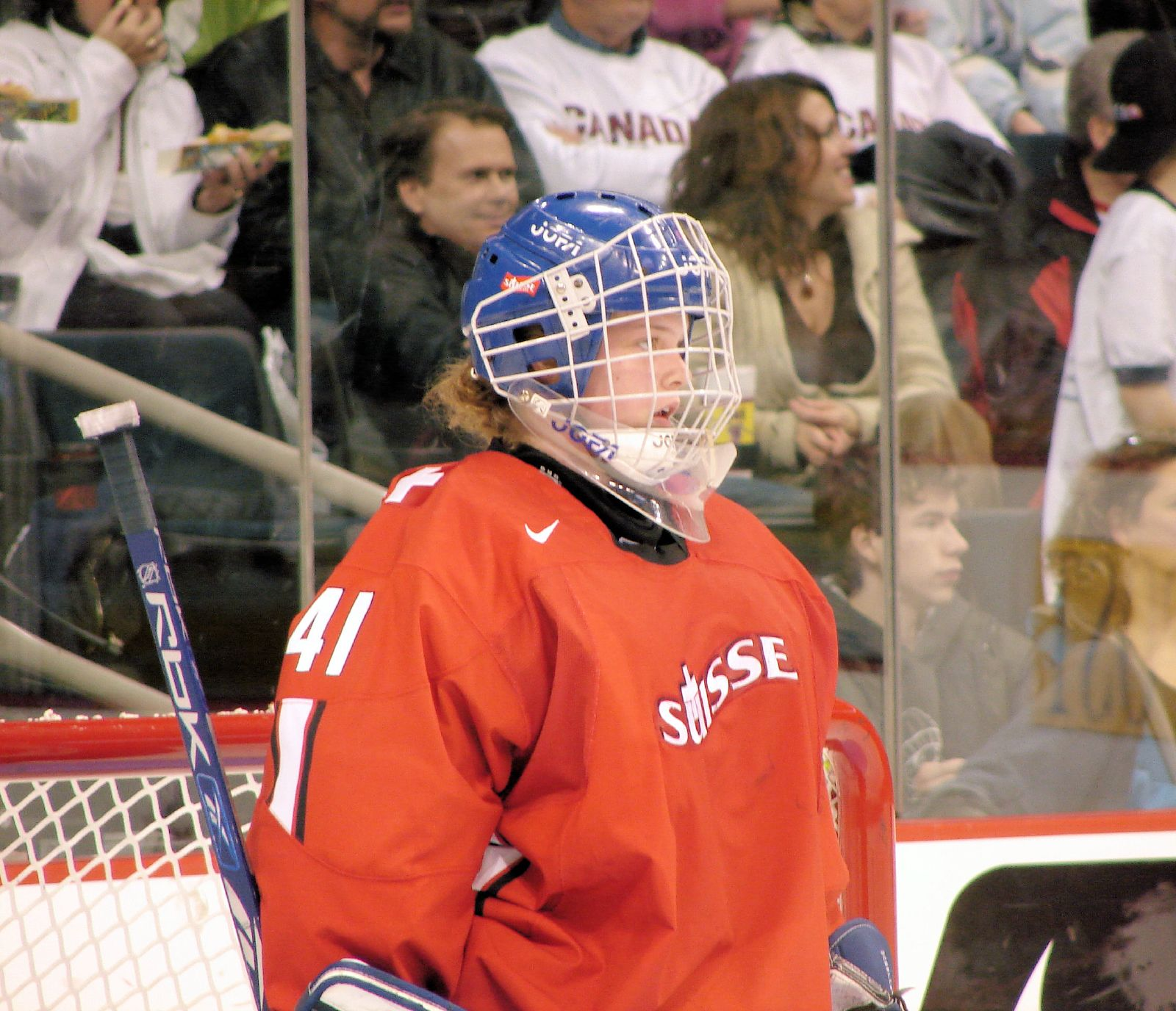
Florence Schelling is considered one of the best goalies in women's hockey history. She has represented Switzerland in multiple Olympics and World Championships

It may seem like there were advancements made in the coverage of women's hockey, but in 2019, it became apparent it was not that easy to watch women's hockey on your television. The Under-18 Women's World Championship in 2019 was moved to be in direct competition with the World Juniors for viewers and media attention. The Women's World Championship is the biggest international event in any non-Olympic year for women, so there was a lot of backlash faced after this decision. Not to mention, the broadcast set up for the 2019 Women's World Championship was a birds-eye view, similar to that of a doorbell camera, whereas the Men's World Junior Championship tournament was aired in its entirety on TSN, with expansive coverage, analysis, and multiple cameras. Many discussed the lack of forethought and care for how a simultaneously scheduled tournament performs in media attention.

Social media, and the help of the NHL player's association, have both been important factors in helping to promote women's hockey. In fact, recently, there was a one-minute video released in February 2021, titled "Stick In The Ground", that features U.S. and Canadian women's national team players, NHL players, tennis great Billie Jean King and even Toronto Mayor John Tory discussing the importance of planting a stick to benefit the future of women's hockey. Numerous NHL players participated in the Professional Women's Hockey Players' Association's campaign, promoting the need to establish a new North American women's league. Various NHL teams have partnered with the PWHPA, including the Toronto Maple Leafs, Chicago Blackhawks, St. Louis Blues, and the New York Rangers. These partnerships have and will continue to help with the visibility of women's hockey.

==== Tennis ====
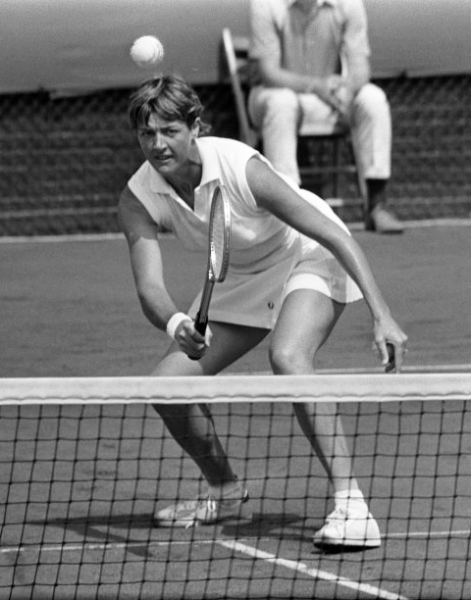
Margaret Court former professional tennis player who holds the record for the most Grand Slam singles titles won, with 24 titles to her name.

Women's tennis does get a lot of viewership. The 2018 US Open Women's singles final had 1.04 million more viewers than the Men's final. Women's Grand Slams received 41 per cent less media attention than men, despite similar viewership. In the only Grand Slam where women received more attention than men, this was due to media focus on controversy (marred by accusations of sexism and racism), rather than ability. During the 2018 U.S. Open Final between Serena Williams and Naomi Osaka, Williams was defeated by Osaka 6–2 and 6–4, but her accomplishment was overshadowed in the media by violations handed to Williams by umpire Carlos Ramos. After two code violations, Serena Williams told Carlos Ramos she "doesn't cheat to win", and claimed he was attacking her character. Williams called Ramos a "thief" and said he had stolen a point from her. After a lengthy exchange with Ramos, which brought Tournament Referee Brian Earley out to the court, a finger-pointing and visibly upset Williams was given a third code violation for verbal abuse, this one costing her a game. Rather than promoting the historical win of Osaka, the media chose to portray Williams as an aggressive, out-of-line individual. There was a cartoon which depicted an overly large and muscular Williams with exaggerated features jumping up and down. Beneath her are a broken racquet and a pacifier, suggesting the athlete engaged in an infantile tantrum on the court. The 2018 U.S. Open headlines and TV coverage were all regarding Serena Williams.

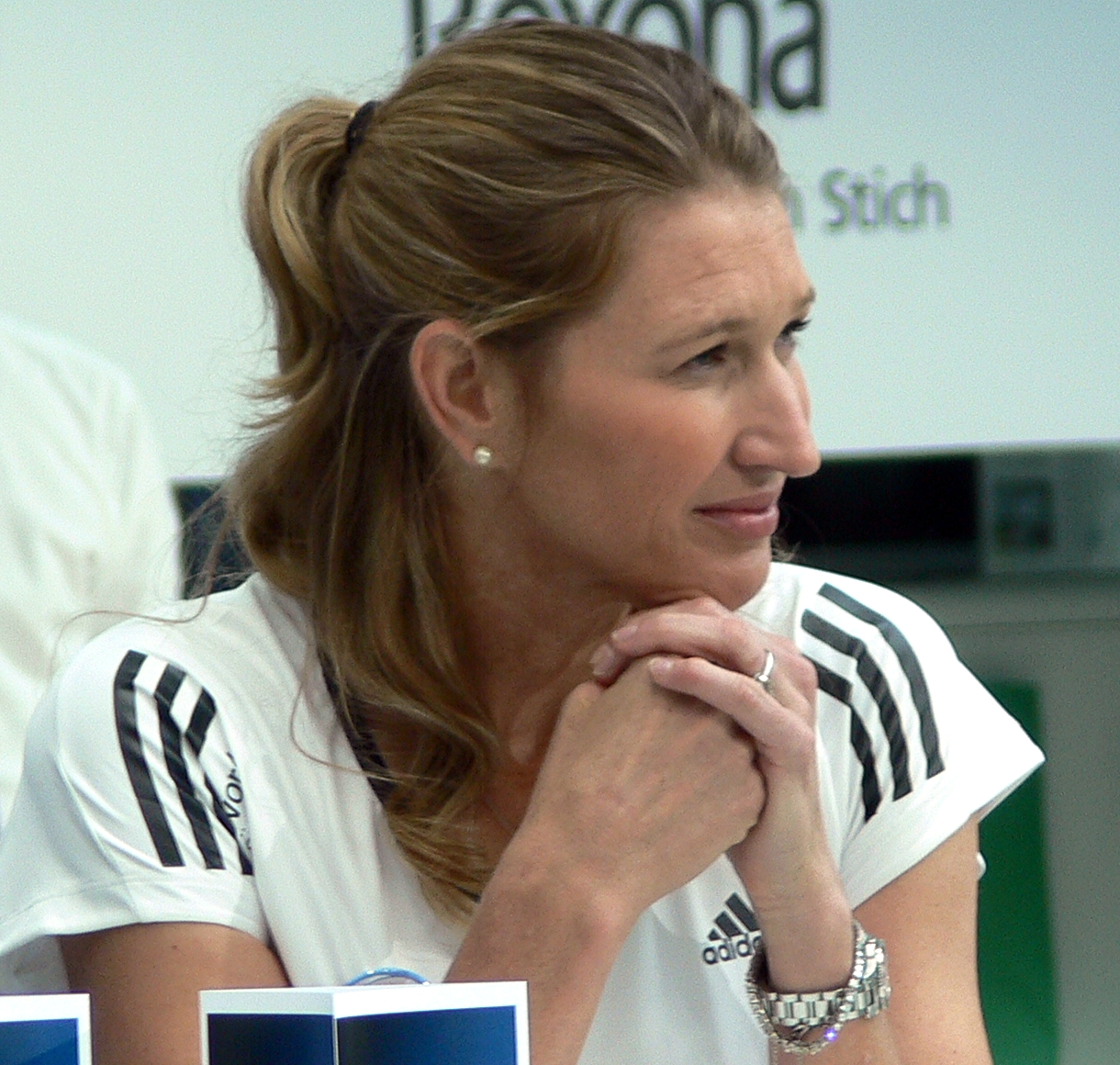
Steffi Grafs powerful and versatile game dominated the sport during the late 1980s and early 1990s.

The audience for the women's final on July 14, 2018, in which Angelique Kerber defeated Serena Williams, peaked at 4.6 million, while the peak figure for Novak Djokovic's victory over Kevin Anderson the next day, which clashed with the football World Cup final, was 4.5 million. During three of the Grand Slams, coverage spikes were significantly larger for men than women. As an example, during the month of Wimbledon (July 2018), the men's singles tournament was covered in 32,200 articles compared to 20,180 for the women's. During the Australian Open, the women's tournament saw 13,900 pieces, some 15,000 fewer than the men's (28,130). Likewise, across May and June, the women's French Open was covered by 7,500 pieces and the men's by 13,300.

There is interest in women's tennis, but it will be important to focus articles on female tennis players as athletes and their abilities, rather than discussing outside factors such as family life or their actions during a game.

==== Soccer ====
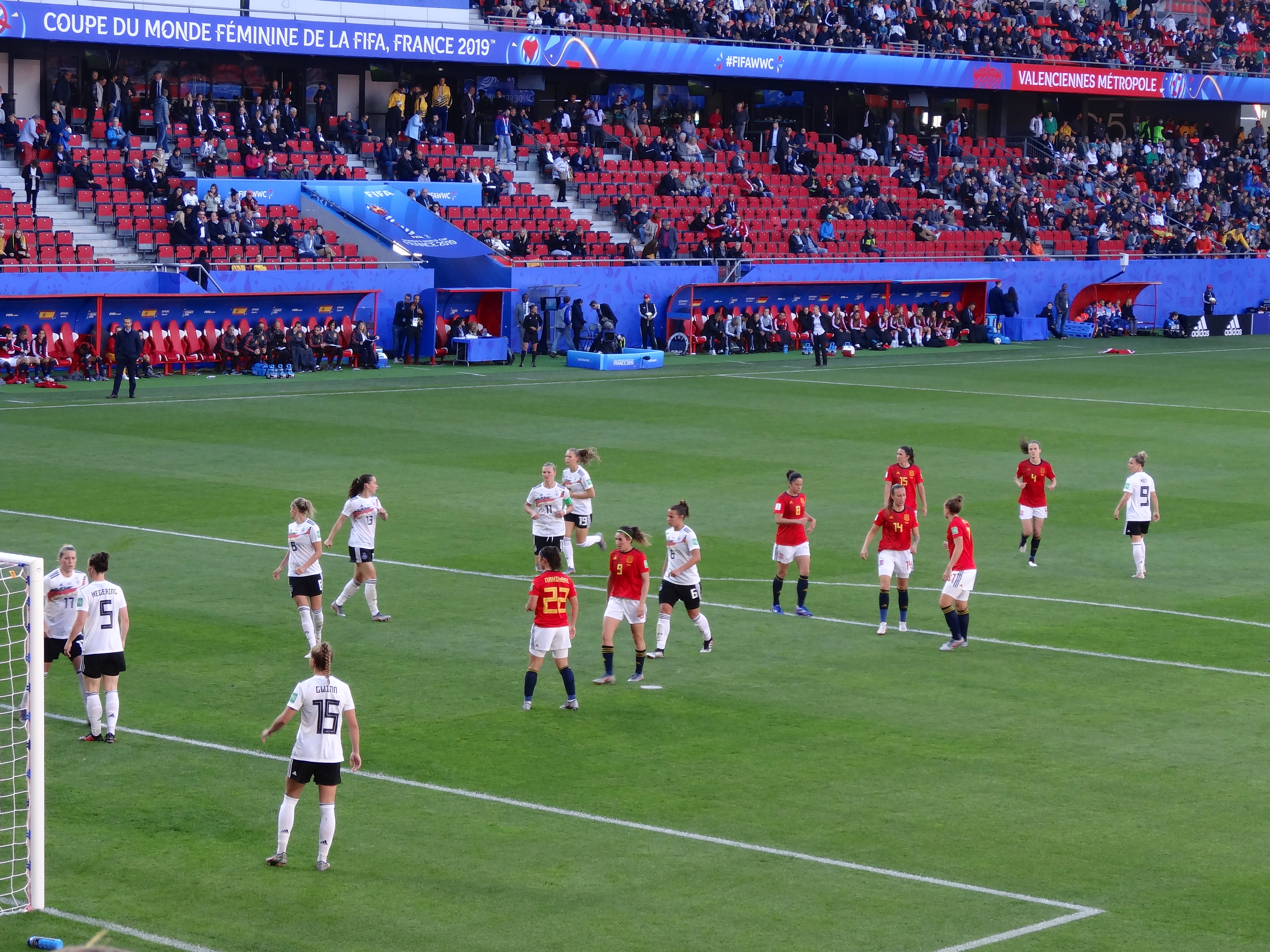
Germany vs Spain; 2019 FIFA Women's World Cup

There has been massive growth in media coverage of women's soccer in recent years. From 2013 to 2016, the National Women's Soccer league was streamed via YouTube or on the individual team's websites for free, with the exception of the Boston Breakers, who charged a small fee. In 2013, the league signed a one-year deal with Fox Sports 2 to televise multiple games during the season, and then in 2014, they signed another one-year deal with ESPN to allow regular season and playoff games to be live streamed on ESPN 2 and ESPN 3. As of 2017, the NWSL announced a three-year deal with A&E Networks, broadcasting 22 regular-season games and 3 playoff matches, which marked the first time the NWSL had a weekly broadcast for the duration of the season. Presently, the NWSL has a three-year agreement with CBS Sports and the Twitch streaming service to broadcast 87 matches split between CBS, CBS Sports Network, and CBS All Access in Canada and the United States. NBC also agreed to broadcast the Olympic tournament through 2032.

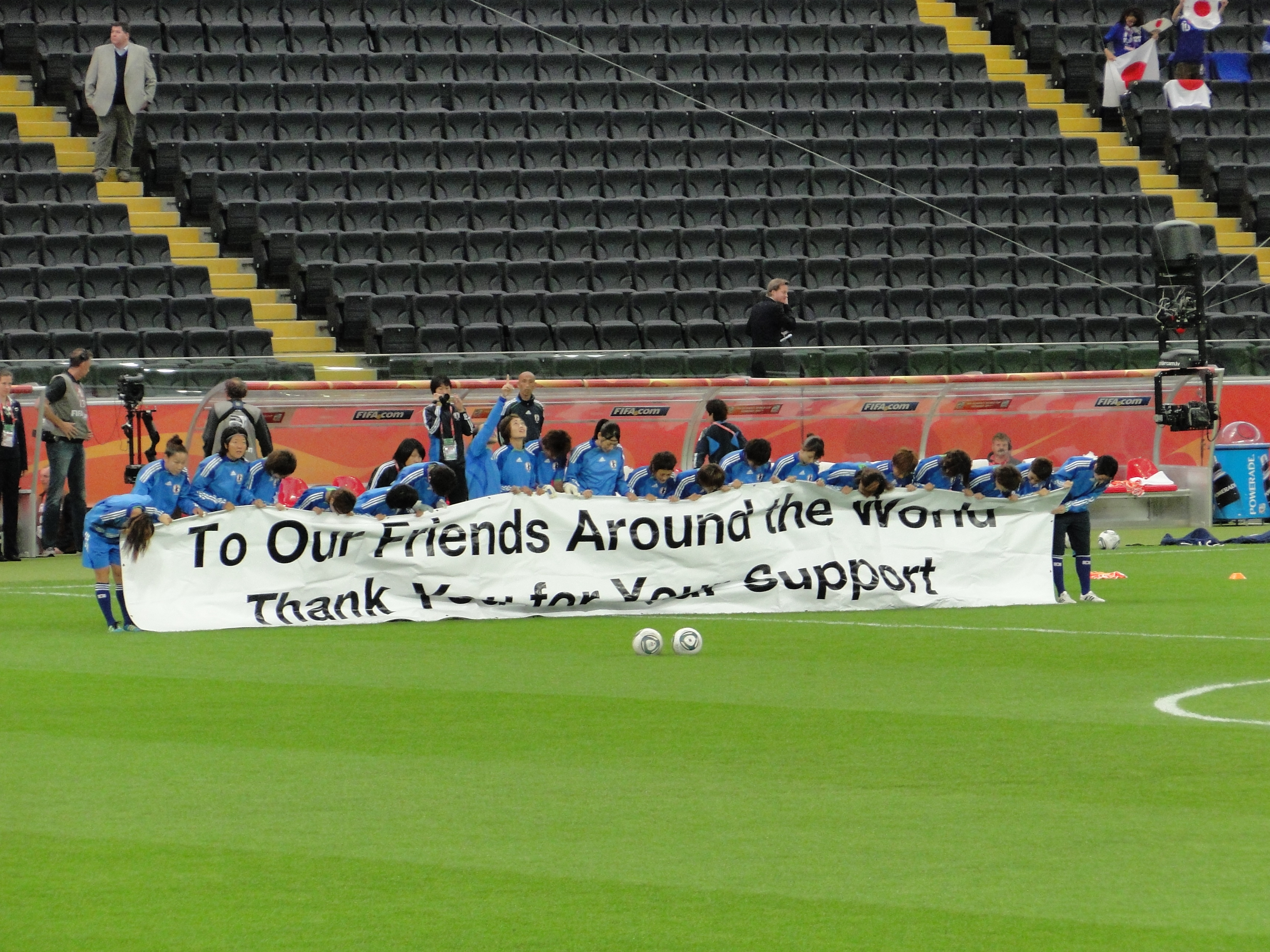
The Japan team thanking fans for their support for the humanitarian response to the 2011 Tōhoku earthquake and tsunami after their World Cup win

The 2015 Women's World Cup Final between the United States and Japan was the most viewed soccer match, between both men's or women's soccer, in American broadcast history. It averaged 23 million viewers and higher ratings than the NBA finals and the Stanley Cup finals. The final was also the most watched US-Spanish language broadcast of a FIFA Women's World Cup match in history. Overall, there were over 750 million viewers for the 2015 FIFA Women's World Cup, making it the most viewed Women's World Cup in history. The FIFA Women's World Cup is now the second-most watched FIFA tournament, with only the men's FIFA World Cup attracting more viewership. The 2019 FIFA Women's World Cup generated record viewership (993 million people watched on TV, 482 million on digital platforms), and the final was more popular than the 2018 men's final, with a 22% larger audience.

It was not until after the U.S. Women's Soccer Team won the World Cup series in 2015 that they decided to take a stand against gender inequality. "I realized that there's not nearly enough media coverage for female athletes in relation to the amount of female athletes who participate in sports", said U.S. Women's Soccer Team member, Alex Morgan. In March 2016, five members of the team joined in to file a wage-discrimination action against the U.S. Soccer Federation, and one year following the action, it was announced that a new collective bargaining agreement had been made. On March 8, 2019, all 28 members of the U.S. Women's Soccer Team filed a lawsuit against the U.S. Soccer Federation for gender discrimination under the Civil Rights Act of 1964, and on March 8, 2021, Congresswomen Doris Matsui and Rosa DeLauro introduced the Give Our Athletes Level Salaries (GOALS) Act to ensure the U.S. Women's Soccer Team members "are paid fair and equitable wages compared to the U.S. Men's team."

To allow for more female-focused media coverage, U.S. Women's Soccer star, Alex Morgan, has recently launched her own media venture focusing on storytelling, specifically content for girls created by female athletes. "Men's sports are always in the spotlight. We'll be focusing on women in sports and sharing the stories that I think a lot of people want hear, and girls need to be given access to." This venture will allow female athletes to use their platform to enhance the viewership of women's sports across the globe.

==== Social media ====
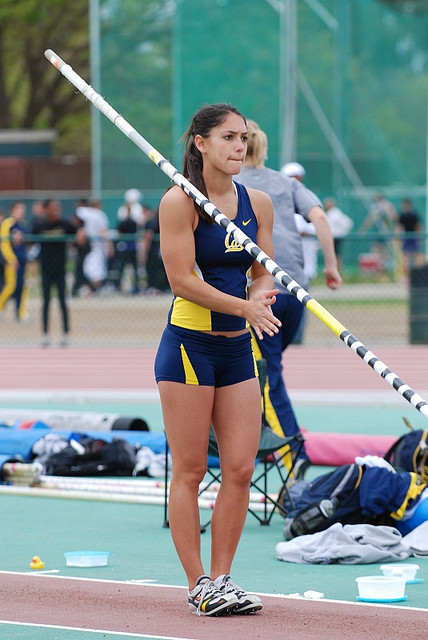
US athlete and fitness model Allison Stokke is an example of female sportspersons with huge following on social media.

With the strong advancements in social media, society is able to learn and grow from like-minded individuals through their platforms. There is a lack of media exposure for female athletes and female sports, and when there is, women are underrepresented or portrayed as being more masculine and out of character. Due to the lack of exposure, female athletes are forced to engage with fans and various brands in order to provide them with sponsorship opportunities. Many female athletes must be employed outside of their sports because their pay is not high enough to cover expenses like that of their male counterparts. This has limited the growth of women's sports. Social media offers female athletes an opportunity to amplify their voices and grow their presence. Female athletes are now often social media influencers, and some try to become role models for the younger generations. Ramla Ali, a Somali born female boxer and Nike sponsored athlete, uses her platform to share her struggles in a male-dominated sport and is sparking inspiration amongst others.

Social media will become a big growth factor in women's sports as it continues to advance. Social media is changing the way sports stars, clubs, and fans are interacting with each other. From live-tweeting games, creating snarky memes, and cheerleading from the webosphere, spectators are no longer simply watching sports, and fans can often get news, insights and commentary straight from the source. The voice as well as the face of sports is changing in response to social and digital media. Through the use of media, sporting clubs, teams, and organizations are able to release news and broadcast their own games, skipping over the use of traditional news media. If female athletes and women's sports organizations are able to market themselves, aside from needing a greater exposure on national television, they will be able to further use its social media platforms to their advantage.

=== Sex testing ===
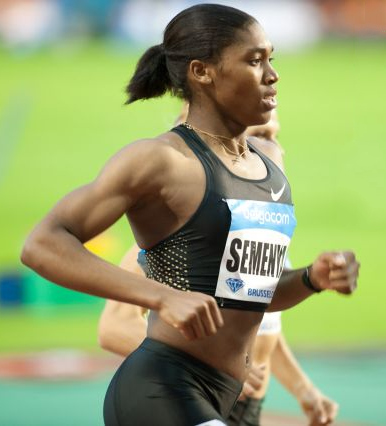
Caster Semenya faced significant challenges regarding eligibility to compete in women's athletics.

Sex verification testing has been used to determine who is allowed to compete as a woman. This is because of cultural belief that males have a biological advantage over females in physical activities. Feminists and women's rights advocates have pushed for equality and better management within sports.

South African runner Caster Semenya won the women's 800 meters race at the 2009 World Championships. Almost immediately after her win, the International Association of Athletics Federations, now known as World Athletics, ordered her to go through sex verification testing. This information was leaked to the press. The results were used to determine if Semenya was qualified to race as a woman, or if she had a "rare medical condition" that would give her an "unfair advantage". The rules about hormone levels have changed several times, and most recently, WA has ordered that women with disorders of sex development that result in natural hyperandrogenism must take medication to reduce their testosterone levels to be eligible to compete. As of June 2019, Semenya is involved in a lawsuit to contest these rules.

== Investment ==
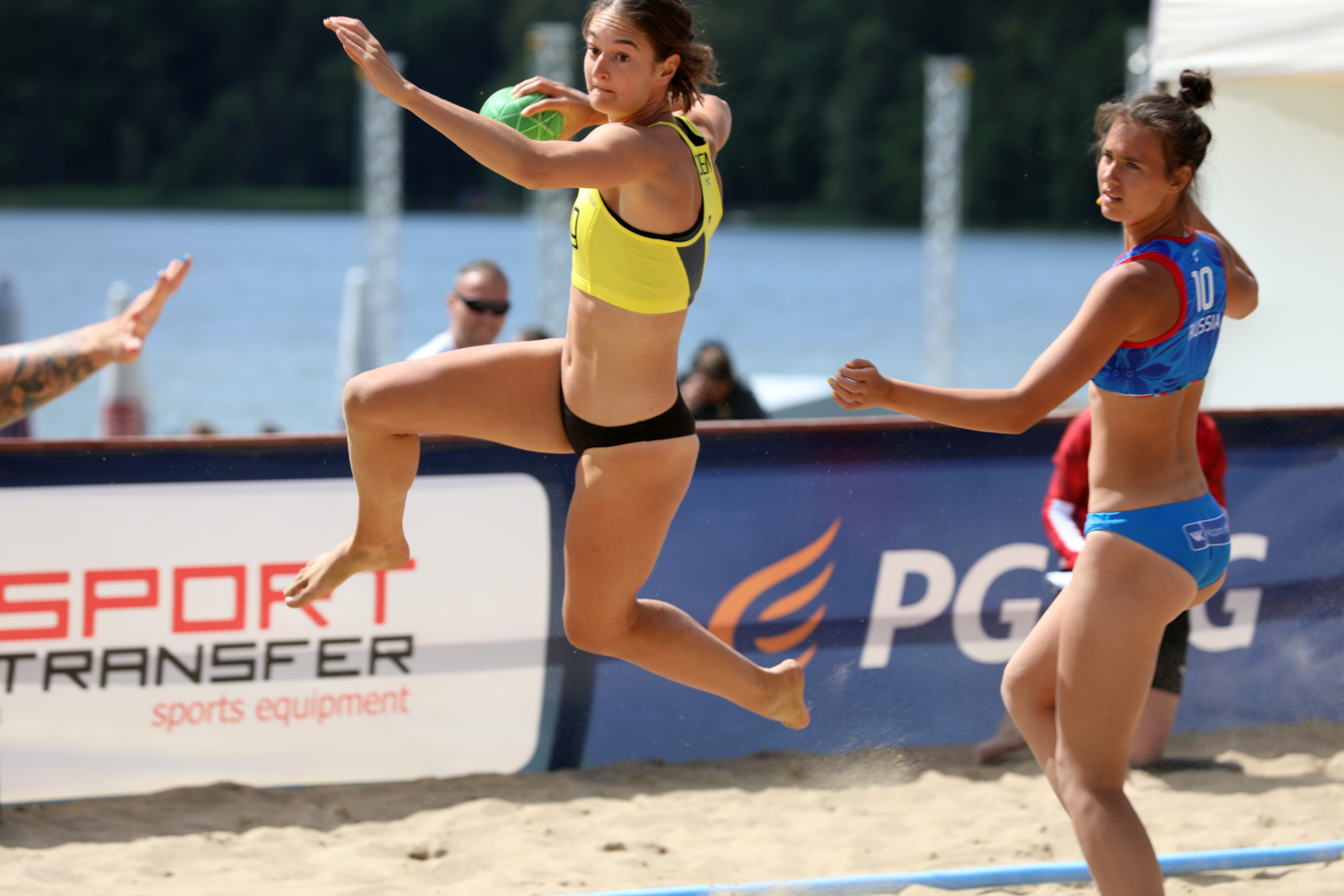
Danish player Frederikke Lærke dives while Russian player Sofiya Lyshina looks on during a women's beach handball match, European Championships 2019

Historically, investment in women's sports has been lacking compared to men's sports. This disparity can be attributed to several factors, including societal attitudes that have traditionally undervalued women's athletic abilities and achievements, as well as the perception that women's sports generate less revenue and have a smaller fan base. As a result, women's sports have often struggled to secure adequate funding, sponsorships, and media coverage, limiting their growth and development.

However, recent trends indicate that investment in women's sports is now picking up. The global women's sports market is expected to see increased investment activity and attract a broader range of investors this year. The report suggests that various investor classes, such as institutional investors, private equity funds, and high net worth individuals, are beginning to recognize the growth potential of women's sports. In response to this growing appetite for investment, women's sports properties are predicted to create standalone commercial entities. The report also highlights that in 2023, women's sport-only properties accounted for 14% of all sports investment deals, with an additional 34% of agreements focused on mixed properties involving both men's and women's rights holders.

== Women's professional sports competitions ==
=== Olympics ===
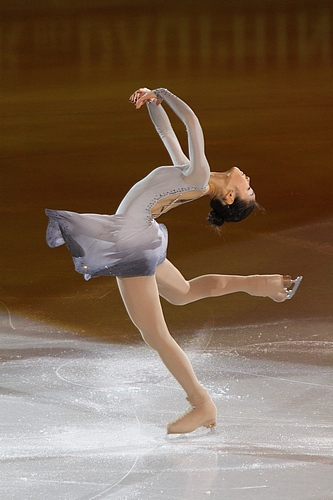
Yuna Kim South Korean figure skater performing at the 2010 World Championships

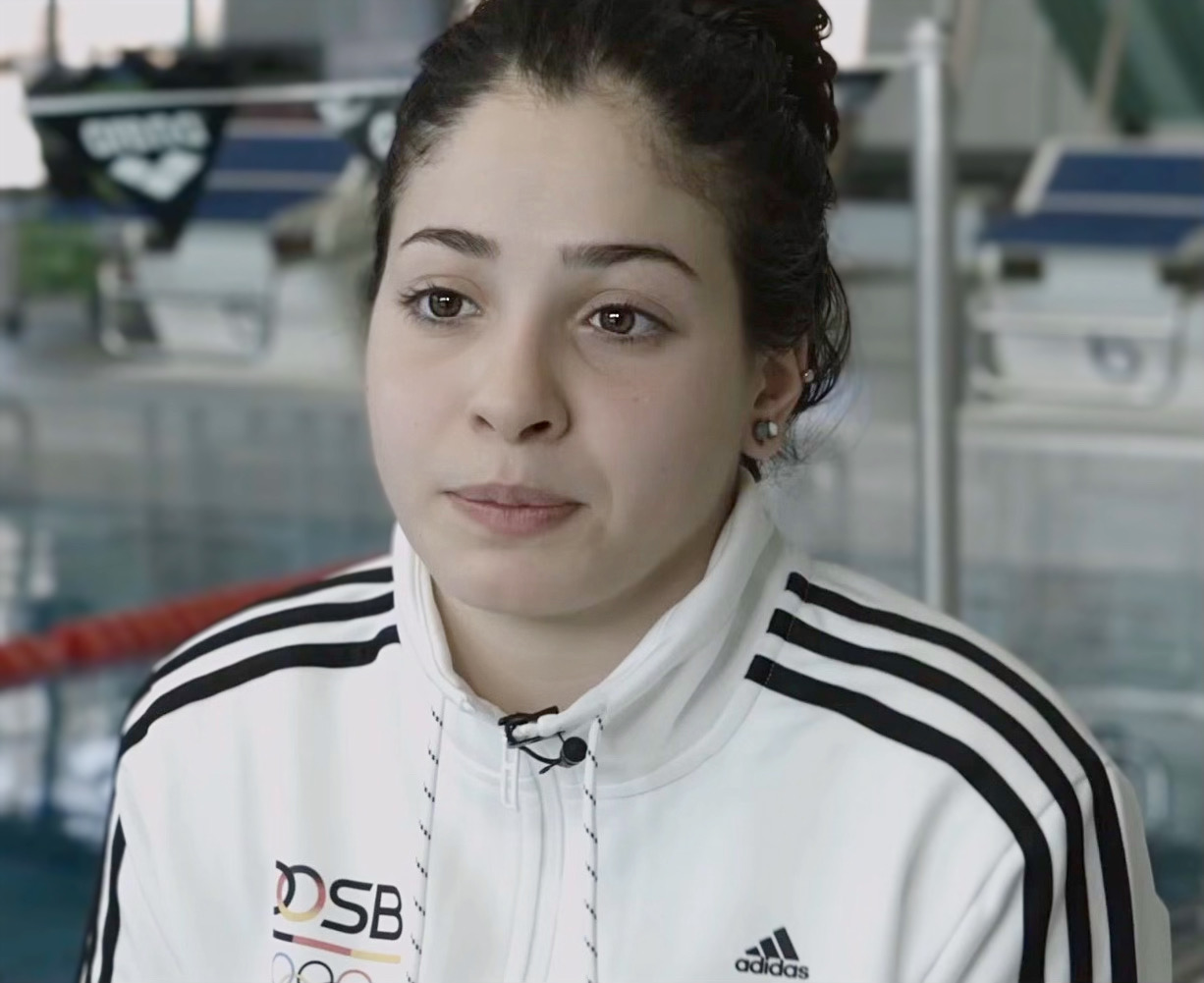
Yusra Mardini is a Syrian-born swimmer who competed as part of the Refugee Olympic Team

- Women's sports at the Olympics

=== Association football ===
==== Domestic leagues ====
- A-League Women (Australia)
- Women's Super League (England)
- Division 1 Féminine (France)
- Frauen-Bundesliga (Germany)
- Serie A (Italy)
- WE League (Japan)
- Liga MX Femenil (Mexico)
- Liga F (Spain)
- National Women's Soccer League (USA)

==== Domestic cups ====
- Copa do Brasil de Futebol Feminino
- FA Women's Cup (England)
- FA Women's Premier League Cup (England)
- FA Women's Community Shield (England)
- NWSL Challenge Cup (USA)

==== International tournaments ====
- Women's World Cup
- AFC Women's Asian Cup
- Algarve Cup
- SheBelieves Cup
- Four Nations Tournament
- CONCACAF W Championship
- CONCACAF W Gold Cup
- OFC Women's Championship
- UEFA Women's Championship
- CONMEBOL Sudamericano Femenino
- Copa Libertadores Femenina
- U-20 World Cup
- U-17 World Cup

=== Badminton ===
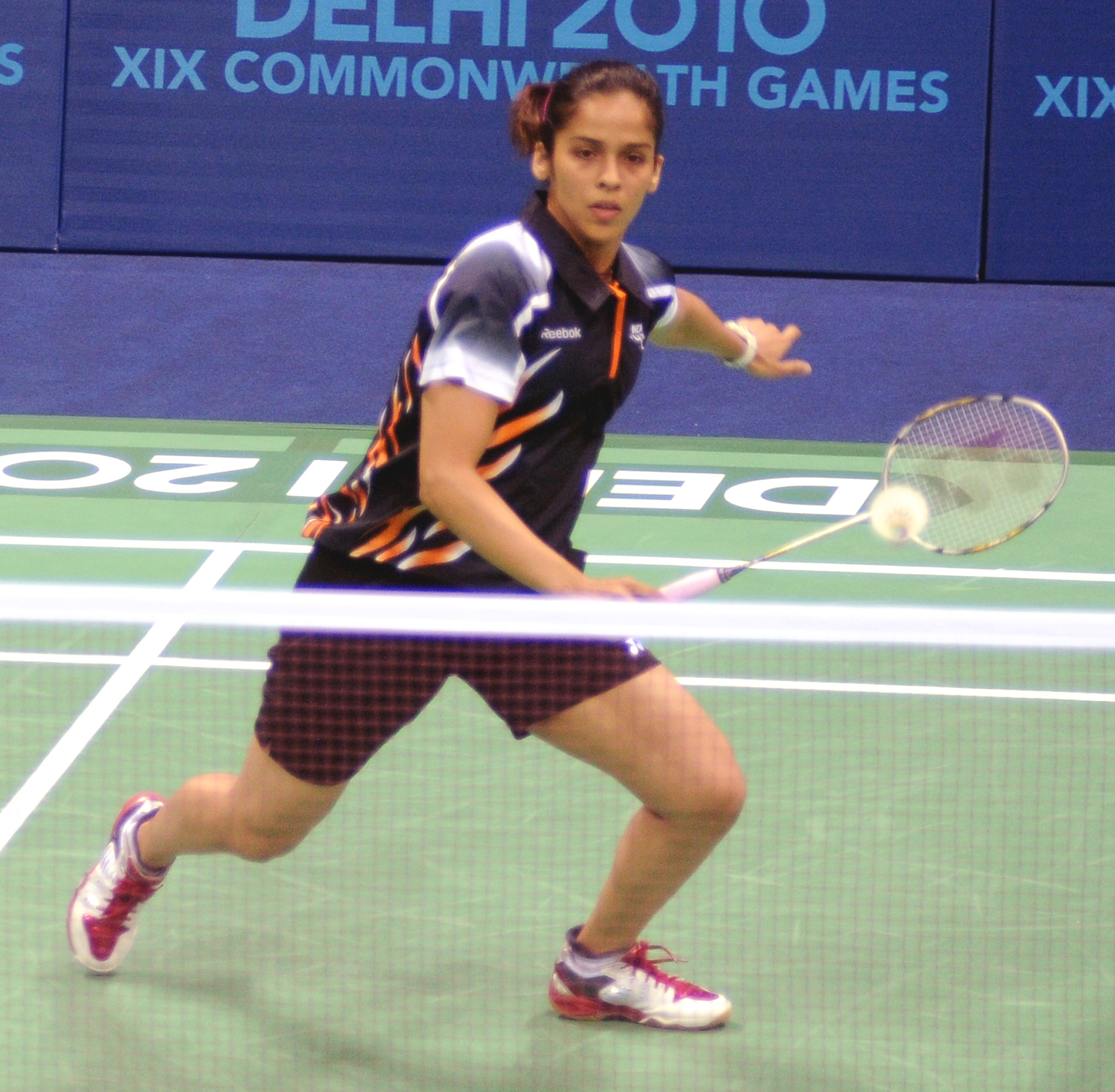
Saina Nehwal is an Indian badminton player who has achieved numerous successes

- BWF World Senior Championships

=== Cricket ===
The ICC Women's world cup, ICC Women's T20 World cup and the Women's Asia Cup are the major women's cricket tournaments. Women's cricket was also included in the 2022 Commonwealth Games.

=== Cycling ===
- UCI Women's Road World Cup

=== Golf ===
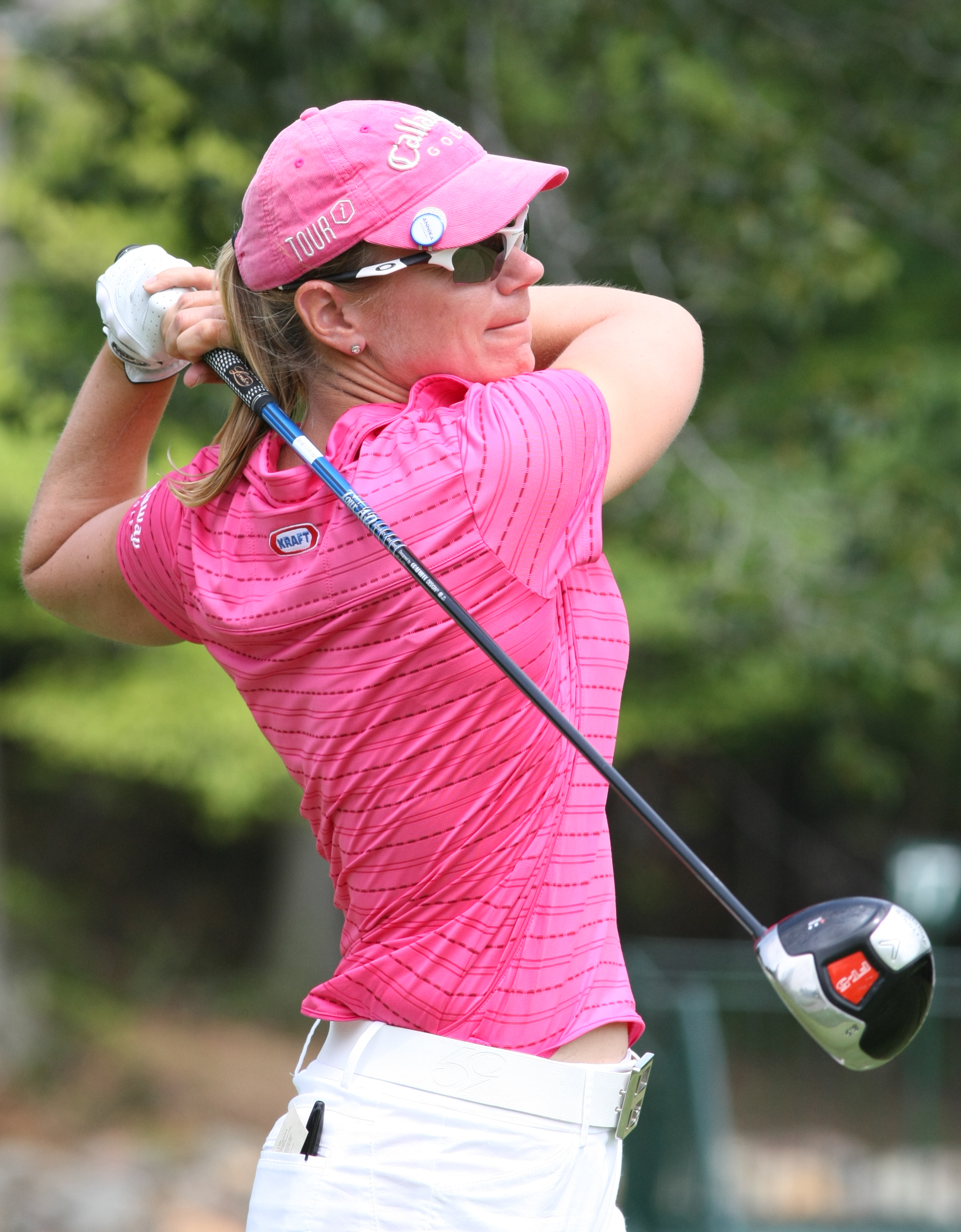
Annika Sörenstam is a golfer with LPGA Tour victories and major championships.

The Ladies European Tour is Europe's leading women's professional golf tour and formed as the WPGA in 1978. Over the last 33 years, the tour has developed into a truly international organization and in 2011 operated 28 golf tournaments in 19 different countries worldwide.

=== Ice hockey ===
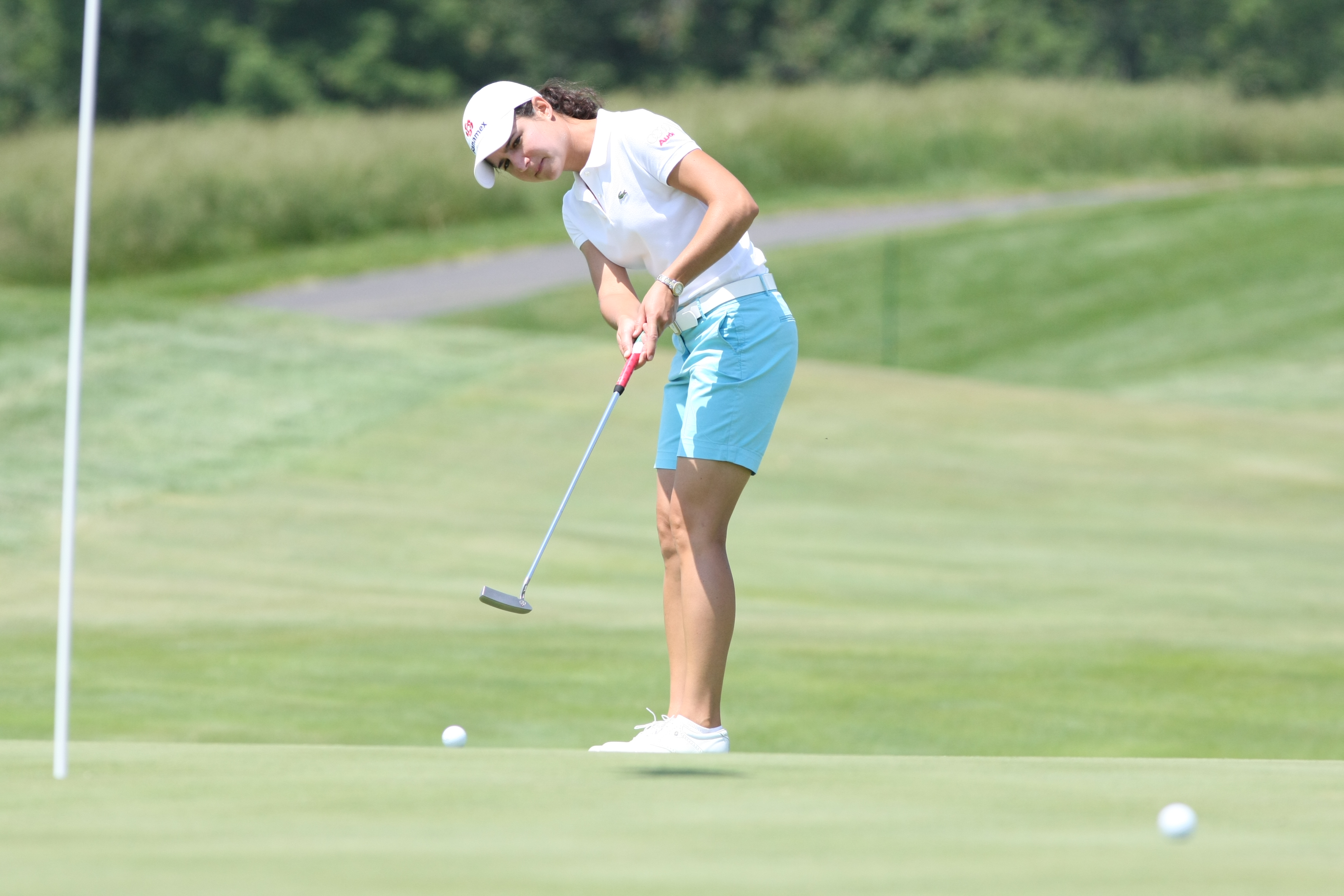
Lorena Ochoa one of Mexico's greatest golfers, known for her successful career on the LPGA Tour.

- Alpine Cup
- Asian Winter Games
- Clarkson Cup
- Coupe Dodge
- Elite Women's Hockey League
- Esso women's hockey nationals
- 4 Nations Cup
- MLP Nations Cup
- NCAA Women's Frozen Four
- IIHF Challenge Cup of Asia
- IIHF European Women's Champions Cup
- IIHF European Women Championships
- IIHF World Women's Championships
- IIHF World Women's U18 Championships
- Professional Women's Hockey League
- Women's hockey Tournament at the Olympic Games
- WickFest
- 1987 World Women's Hockey Tournament
- Women's Pacific Rim Championship
- Winter Universiade

=== Netball ===
- ANZ Championship — defunct; replaced by:
  - ANZ Premiership in New Zealand
  - Suncorp Super Netball in Australia
- Netball and the Olympic Movement

=== Rugby League ===
- NRL Women's Premiership

=== Softball ===
- Softball at the Olympics
- Softball at the 1996 Summer Olympics
- Softball at the 2000 Summer Olympics
- Softball at the 2004 Summer Olympics
- Softball at the 2008 Summer Olympics

=== Tennis ===
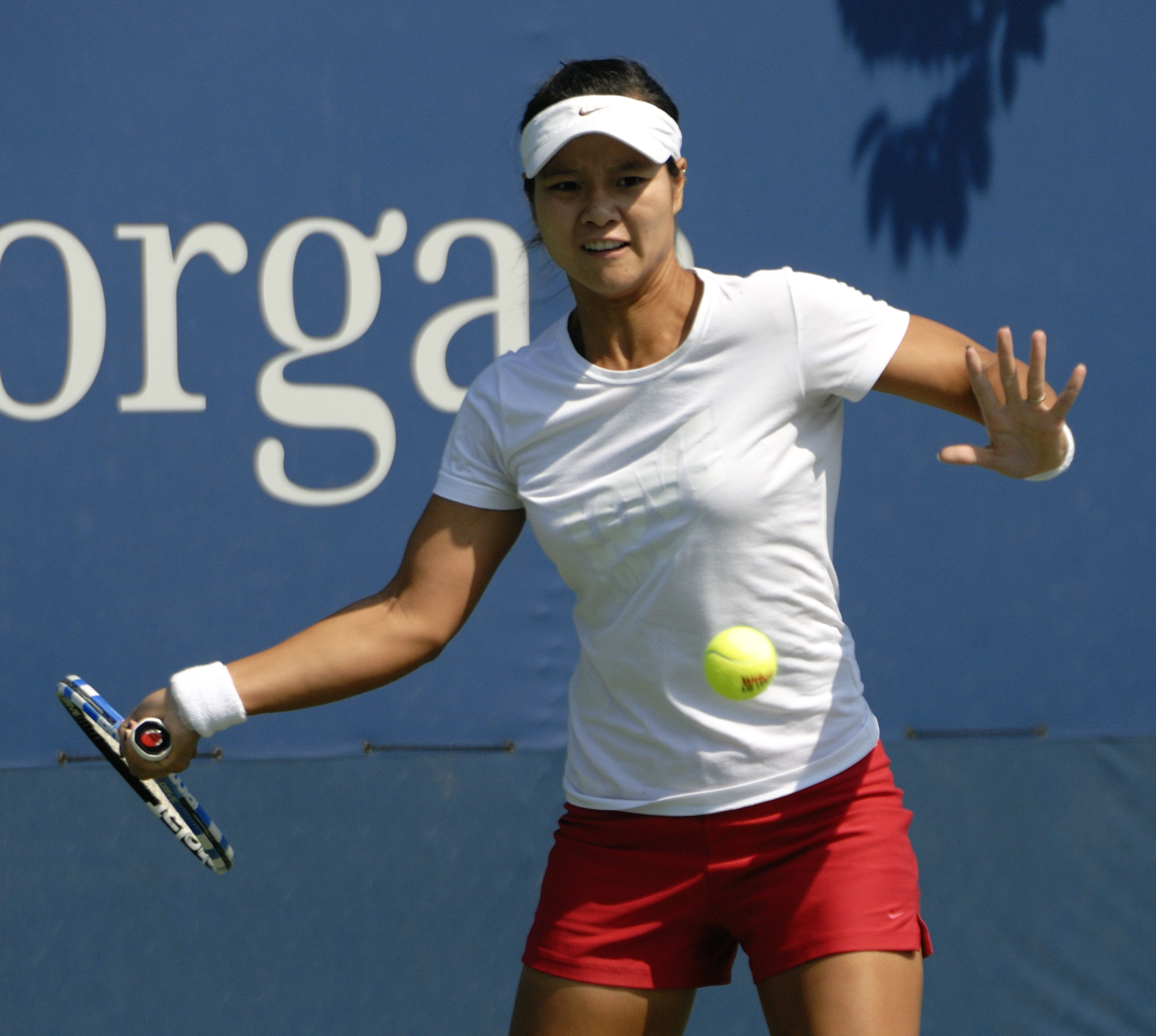
Li Na first Asian player to win a Grand Slam singles title.

- Grand Slam

== Active women's professional leagues and associations ==
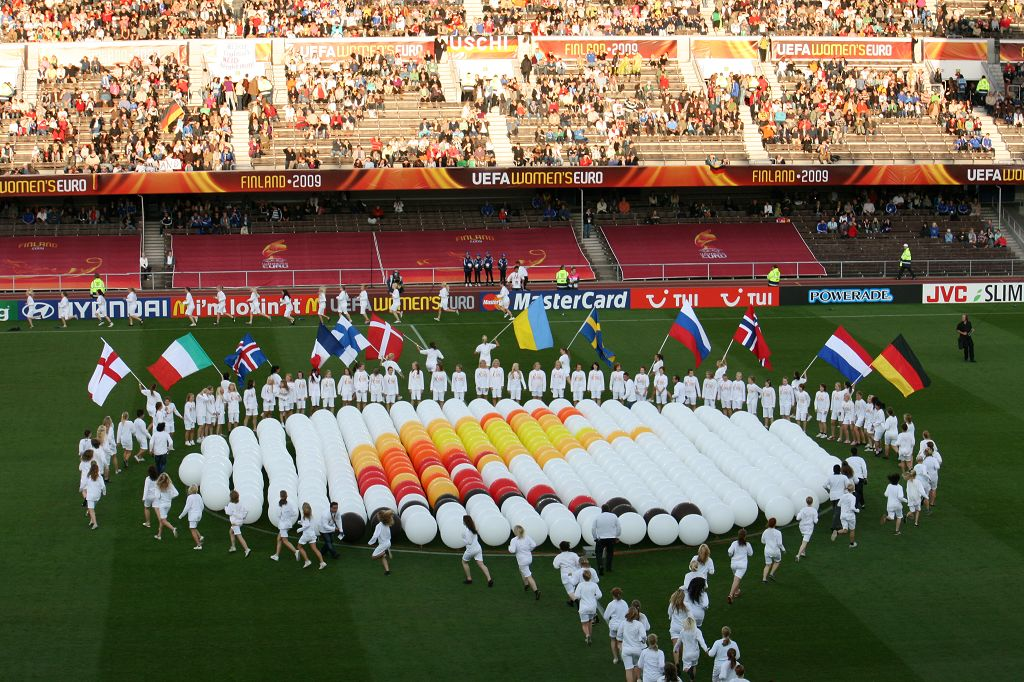
The UEFA Women's Championship, also known as the UEFA Women's Euro, is the primary international football competition for women's national teams in Europe.

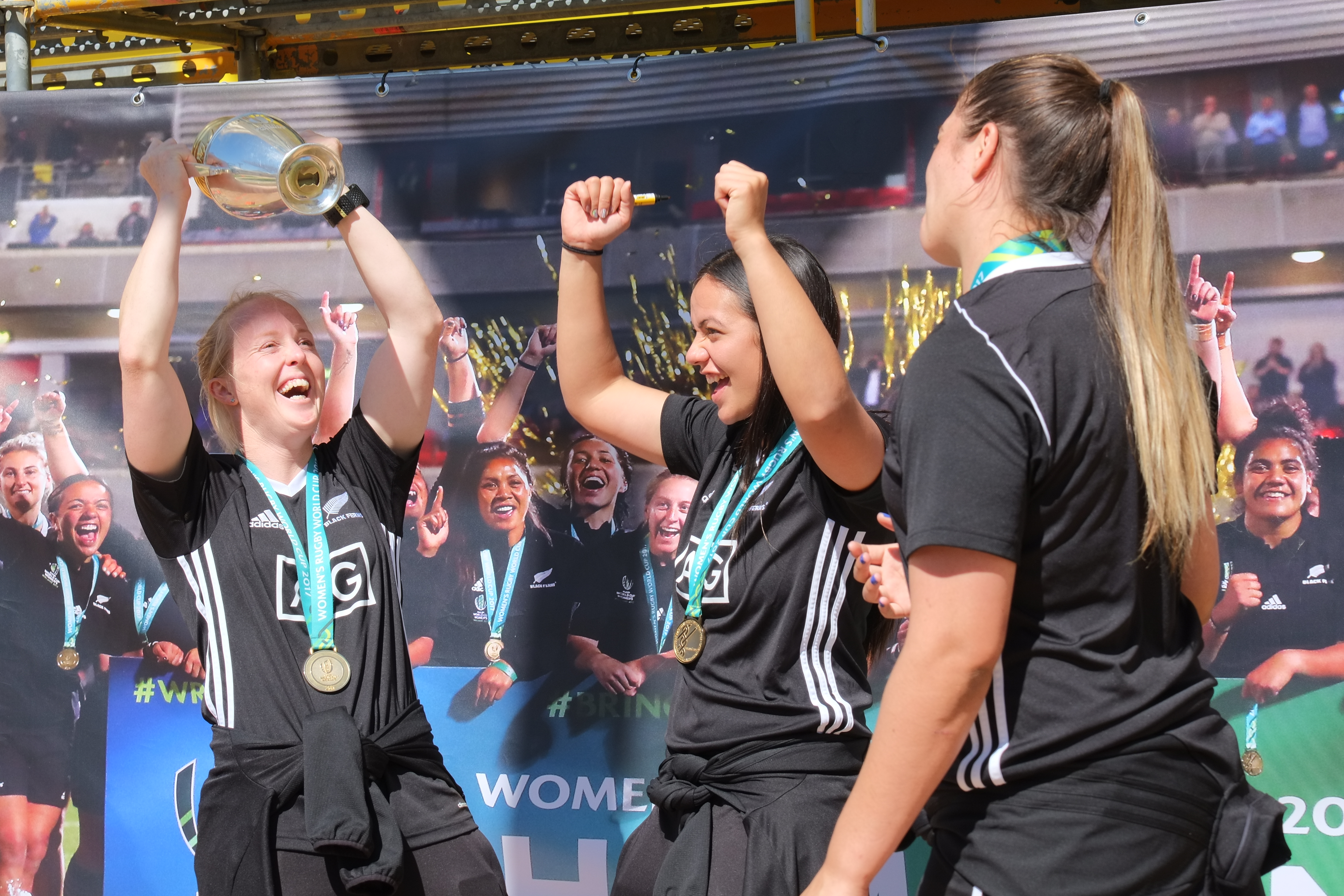
New Zealand celebrating their Women's Rugby World Cup title in 2017

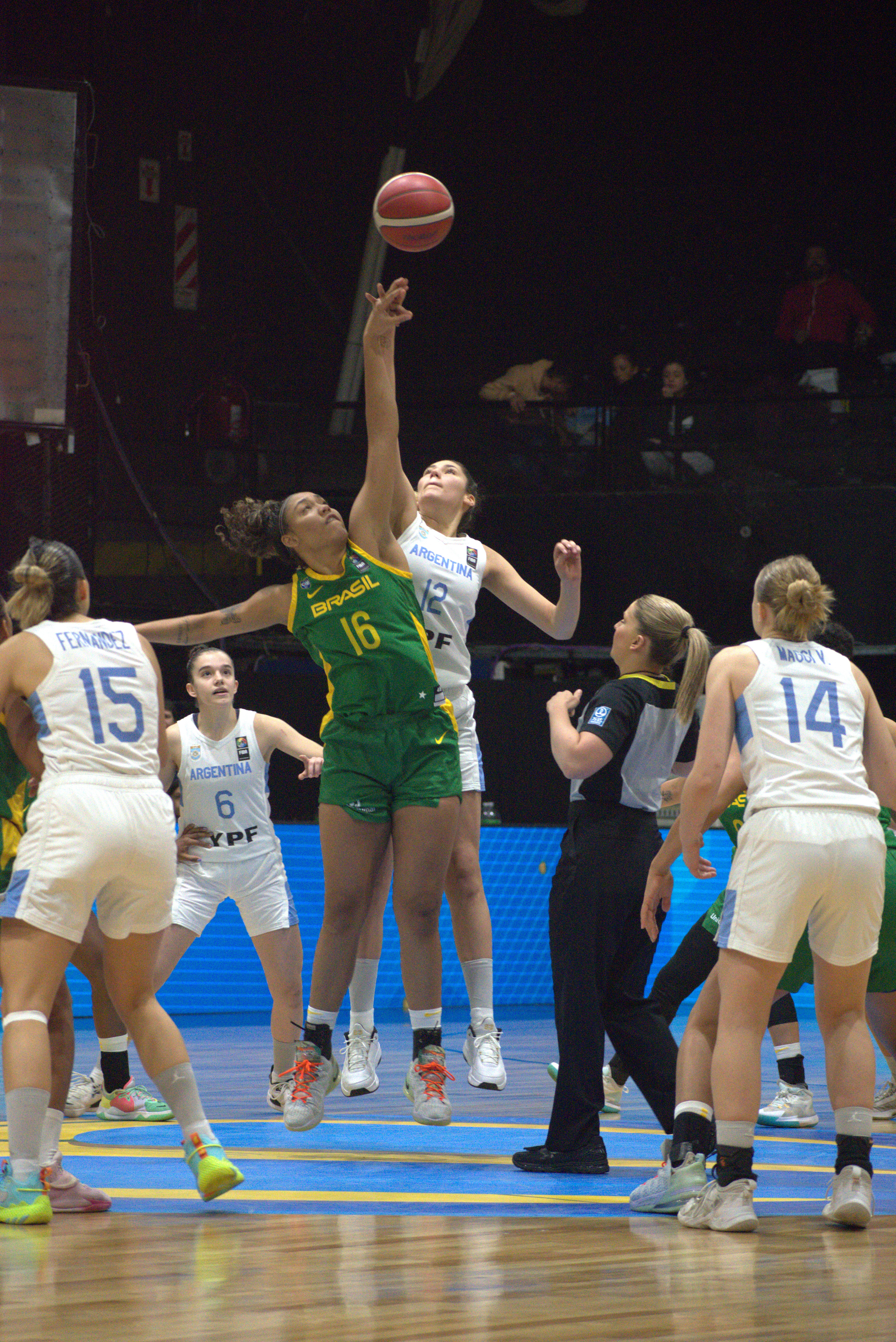
Initial jump at the match for the 3rd place in the FIBA Under-18 Women's Americas Championship Buenos Aires 2022 between Argentina and Brazil.

Country	Sport	League or Association Name
Australia	Association football	Liberty A-League Women
Australia	Australian rules football	AFL Women's
Australia	Basketball	Women's National Basketball League
Australia	Cricket	Women's Big Bash League
Australia	Golf	ALPG Tour
Australia	Netball	Suncorp Super Netball
Canada	Ice hockey	Professional Women's Hockey League
China	Basketball	Women's Chinese Basketball Association
China	Golf	China LPGA Tour
Denmark	Handball	HTH Ligaen
England (UK)	Association football	FA Women's Super League
England (UK)	Rugby union	Premier 15s
Europe	Golf	Ladies European Tour
France	Association football	Division 1 Féminine
Germany	Association football	Frauen-Bundesliga
India	Cricket	Women's T20 Challenge
Japan	Association football	Yogibo WE League
Japan	Golf	LPGA of Japan Tour
Mexico	Association football	Liga MX Femenil
New Zealand	Netball	ANZ Premiership
Russia	Basketball	Russian Women's Basketball Premier League
South Korea	Golf	LPGA of Korea Tour
Turkey	Volleyball	Turkish Women's Volleyball League
USA	Association football	National Women's Soccer League
USA	Basketball	Women's National Basketball Association
USA	Basketball	Unrivaled
USA	Golf	Ladies Professional Golf Association
USA	Golf	Legends Tour (age 45 and over)
USA	Golf	Epson Tour (second-tier tour)
USA	Ice hockey	Professional Women's Hockey League
USA	Lacrosse	Women's Lacrosse League
USA	Softball	National Pro Fastpitch
USA	Softball	Athletes Unlimited Pro Softball
Worldwide	Tennis	Women's Tennis Association
Worldwide	Motorsports	W Series

== See also ==
- Women's sports
- Professional sports
- Mixed-sex sports
- List of sportswomen
- Prominent women's sports leagues in the United States and Canada
- Category:Sportswomen by sport
- Category:Women's national sports teams
- Women's National Basketball Association (WNBA)
- Unrivaled
- National Women's Soccer League (NWSL), effective replacement of the following defunct leagues:
  - Women's Professional Soccer (WPS)
  - Women's United Soccer Association (WUSA)
- USL Super League (a second U.S. top-level league; launched in 2024)
- Northern Super League (Canada)
- USL W-League (defunct)
- United Women's Soccer
- National Pro Fastpitch (NPF)
- National Ringette League (NRL)
- Professional Women's Hockey League (PWHL), effective replacement of:
  - Premier Hockey Federation (PHF)
- Western Women's Hockey League (WWHL)
- Canadian Women's Hockey League (CWHL)
- Legends Football League
