= Canadian women's ice hockey history =

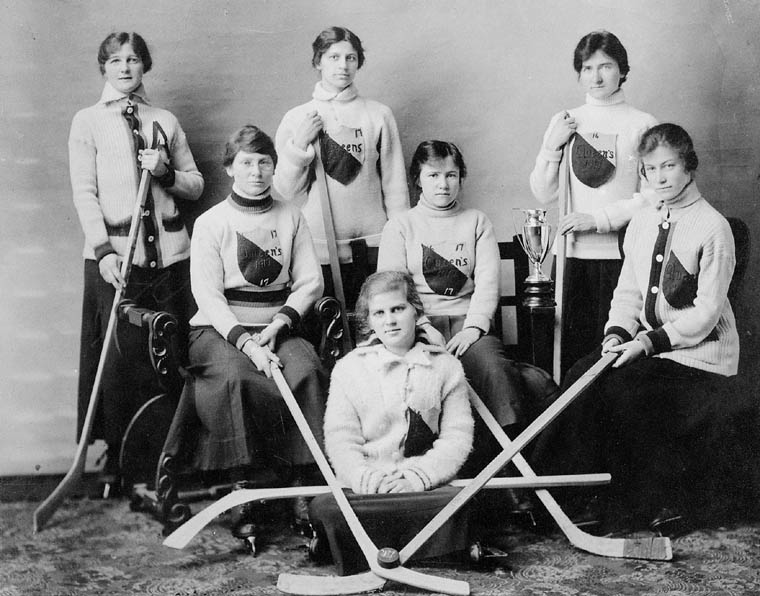
1917 Queen's University, Kingston, Ontario. Charlotte Whitton is in the centre

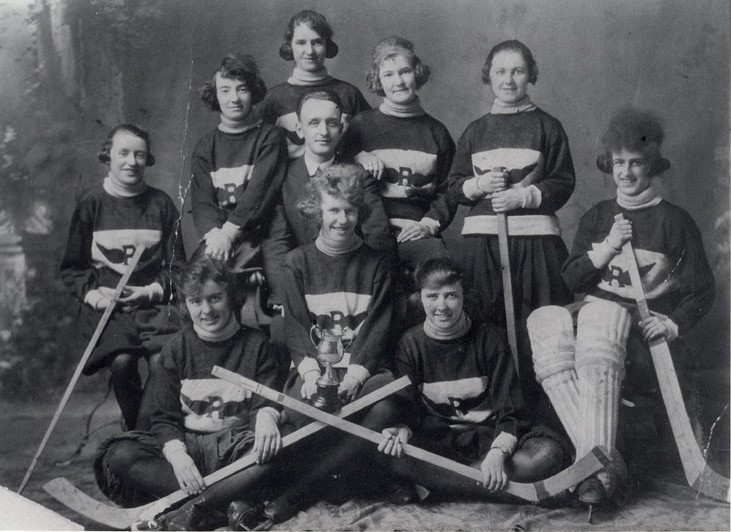
1919 Eaton's Red Wings, women's hockey team, Moncton, New Brunswick, Canada

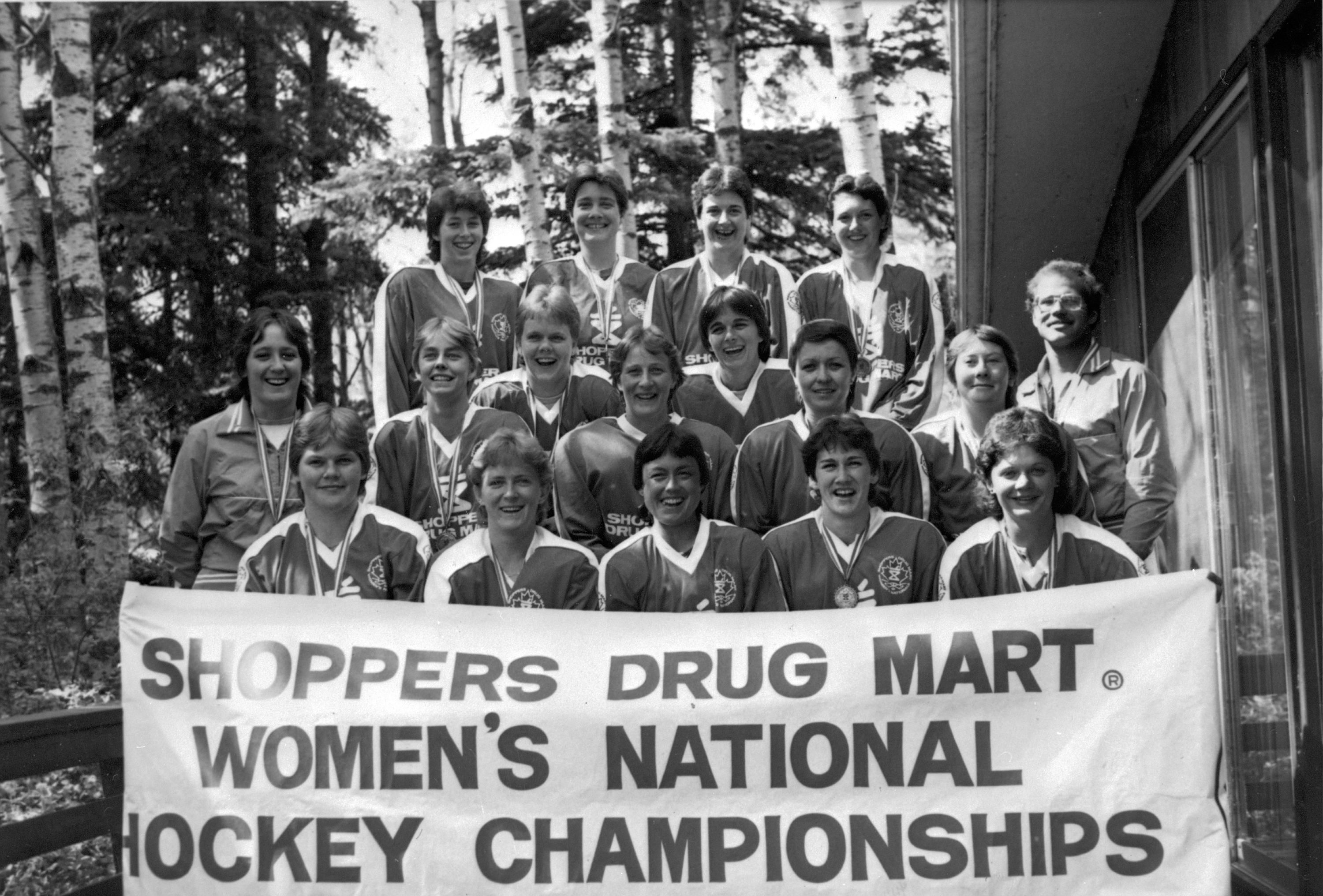
Edmonton Chimos (1984), National champions. The first Canadian National Women's Hockey Championship was known as the "Shopper's Drug Mart Women's Nationals"

The first instances of organized women's ice hockey in Canada date back to the 1890s when it was played at the university level. The Women's Hockey Association claims that the city of Ottawa, Ontario hosted the first game in 1891. In 1920, Lady Meredith, an avid sportswoman and wife of Sir Vincent Meredith of Montreal, donated the Lady Meredith Cup to the Quebec Ladies' Hockey Association, said to be the first women's ice hockey trophy created for a competition in Canada. At the time, women competed in ankle-length skirts.

In February 1921, a women's North American championship series was played in conjunction with the Pacific Coast Hockey Association. The Vancouver Amazons from the 1920s became one of the first professional teams. They were the first women's hockey team from Vancouver to participate in the invitational women's hockey tournament sponsored by the Banff Winter Carnival. On 16 December 1922, a meeting was held to announce the formation of the Ladies Ontario Hockey Association. The Dominion Women's Amateur Hockey Association was founded in winter 1933. Lady Bessborough, the wife of Governor General of Canada Lord Bessborough donated a championship trophy.

In 1978, Cookie Cartwright organized the Ontario Women's Hockey Association to generate interest in women's ice hockey. Fran Rider became the executive director. Cartwright solicited help from several experienced hockey people including Rhonda Leeman Taylor, Bev Mallory, Carl Noble, and later on, Frank Champion Demers. Rhonda Leeman Taylor became the first Development Coordinator for the women's game in the province. Coaches were quoted in the Toronto Star that Rhonda may bring the women's game into respectability.

The Abby Hoffman Cup was introduced in 1982 at the first Canadian National Women's Hockey Championship known as the "Shopper's Drug Mart Women's Nationals". In 1982, the first Esso Women's Nationals occurred in Brantford, Ontario, Canada under the guidance of Rhonda Leeman Taylor, who after went on to become the first woman to sit on Hockey Canada's board of directors. The final saw Alberta and Ontario face-off, with attendance of approximately 1,600 fans.

Leeman Taylor was the first individual to take women's hockey into the Corporate Board Room of Canada. For the first Nationals she was able to seek National Sponsorship from Shoppers Drug Mart and Air Canada. Also in 1982, she lobbied several provinces to eliminate intentional checking from the women's game. All Provinces voted for the rule change except for one province. In addition, she founded and directed the Female Council, a subsect of the Canadian Amateur Hockey Association, representing female hockey in Canada.

In April 1987, Toronto, Ontario hosted the first ever Women's World Championship, though the tournament was not recognized by the International Ice Hockey Federation. The Ontario Women's Hockey Association hosted the tournament. During the tournament, representatives from participating nations met to establish a strategy to lobby the International Ice Hockey Federation (IIHF) for the creation of a Women's World Championship. The first IIHF-sanctioned tournament was held in Ottawa, Ontario in 1990. Women's hockey was included in the Olympics for the first time in 1998.

== Early history ==
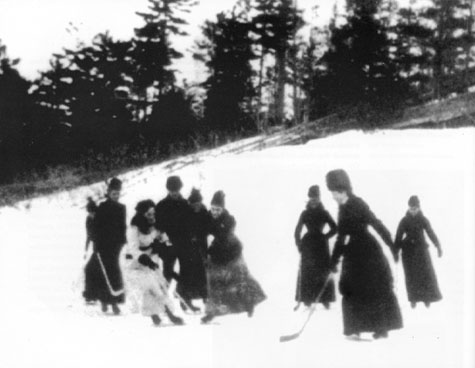
Women playing hockey at Rideau Hall c. 1890 (earliest known image of women's hockey)

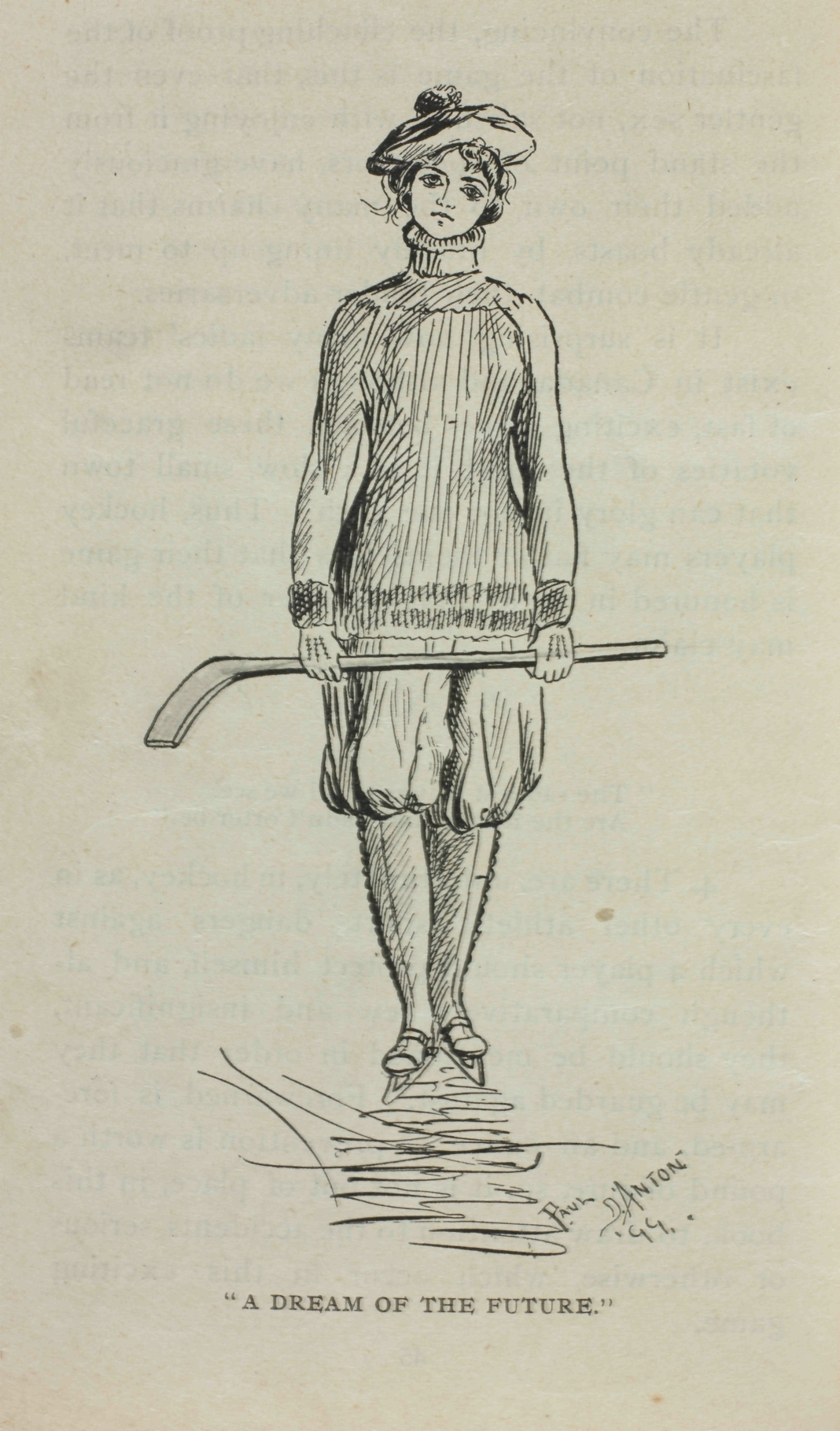
Drawing of a female ice hockey player, from Hockey: Canada's Royal Winter Game (1899)

Lord Stanley of Preston's daughter, Lady Isobel Stanley, was a pioneer in the women's game and was one of the first females to be photographed using puck and stick (around 1890) on the natural ice rink at Rideau Hall in Ottawa, Ontario, Canada. Stanley, Canada's sixth Governor General, provided the ice for women's hockey games, transforming a large lawn on the grounds of Rideau Hall into a rink. Better known for his contribution of the challenge trophy later referred to as the Stanley Cup, Lord Stanley played a significant role in the development and growth of Canadian women's hockey. There have been disputes over where the first women's ice hockey game was played in Canada. The Women's Hockey Association claims that the city of Ottawa, Ontario hosted the first game in 1891. On 11 February 1891, one of the earliest newspaper accounts of a seven-a-side game between women appeared in the Ottawa Citizen.

In the 1890s, women's ice hockey was introduced at the university level. McGill University's women's hockey team debuted in 1894. The University of Toronto and Queen's University in Kingston, Ontario were also some of the earliest Canadian universities to field women's ice hockey teams. Queen's would later discontinue its women's teams.

On 8 March 1899, an account appeared in the Ottawa Evening Journal newspaper of a game played between two women's teams of four per side at the Rideau Skating Rink in Ottawa. From 1915 to 1918 Albertine Lapensée played for the Cornwall Nationals. She is often considered Canada's first female hockey "superstar". In 1920, Lady Isobel Brenda (Allan) Meredith of Montreal donated the "Lady Meredith Cup", the first ice hockey trophy in Canada to be competed for between women in ankle-length skirts. Lady Meredith (the wife of Sir Vincent Meredith) was the first cousin of Sir H. Montagu Allan who had donated the Allan Cup for men's amateur ice hockey in 1908. In the 1910s, women's ice hockey is known to have been played in Victoria, British Columbia.

Elizabeth Graham would play ice hockey for Queen's University and is credited as being the first goaltender ever to wear a mask for protection. She used the mask in 1927, and the use of the mask was in the Montreal Daily Star. She actually wore a fencing mask and the speculation is that she had used the mask as a means of protecting dental work that had been recently performed.

Abigail "Abby" Hoffman, gold medallist in the 880 yard event at the 1966 Commonwealth Games, first made a name for herself in ice hockey. She cut her hair short and pretended to be a boy in order to play with the St. Catharines Teepees, in a boys league. Once it was discovered that Hoffman was masquerading as a boy, the story made headlines around the world. An Ontario Supreme Court decision barred her from participating, although her parents challenged the league's "boys only" rule, but the league's policy was upheld by the provincial high court. In later years, Hoffman would help organize a national women's hockey championship (with representation from each province).

During the 1960s, Cookie Cartwright and a group of dedicated students revived the women's ice hockey program at Queen's University. Cartwright and the Golden Gaels would go on to capture the first women's university championship.

The women's game in Canada has been governed by the men's hockey system, except for Ontario which is governed by a separate women's hockey association. The Ontario Women's Hockey Association (OWHA) formed in 1975 and, though it was founded on the principles of collegialism (a collective volunteerism), it has shifted toward a professional mandate in more recent years.

The province of Ontario has seen growth in the number of women participating in hockey. In 2003, there were 31,122 hockey players in female leagues in the province of Ontario. These players were part of 2,060 teams. In 1993, Ontario had 7,848 girls registered on 557 teams.

=== PCHA Tournament ===
As early as January 1916, Frank Patrick and Lester Patrick talked of the formation of a women's league to complement the Pacific Coast Hockey Association. The proposal included teams from Vancouver, Victoria, Portland and Seattle. The proposed league was never formed.

In early January 1921, a team from Victoria, referred to in the Victoria Colonist as the Victoria and Island Athletic Association ladies team defeated a team from the University of British Columbia. This was the first reported occurrence of women's ice hockey in Victoria since 1914. In February 1921, Frank Patrick announced a women's international championship series that would be played in conjunction with the Pacific Coast Hockey Association. The three teams that competed were the Vancouver Amazons, Victoria Kewpies, and Seattle Vamps. On 21 February 1921, the Seattle Vamps competed against the Vancouver Amazons in Vancouver, and were vanquished by a 5–0 score. Two days later, the Vamps played against a team from the University of British Columbia and won the game. Jerry Reed scored three goals (a hat trick) in the game for the Vamps. In both games, the Vancouver media referred to the Seattle team as the Seattle Sweeties. The Amazons would travel to Seattle and defeat them again. On 2 March 1921, the Vamps were defeated by the Kewpies 1–0 in Seattle. In the rematch on 12 March, the Vamps travelled to Victoria. The result was a 1–1 tie, and Jerry Reed scored the goal for Seattle. The goaltender for the Vamps was Mildren Terran. After the 1921 season, the Vamps and the Kewpies ceased operations.

=== Early rules ===
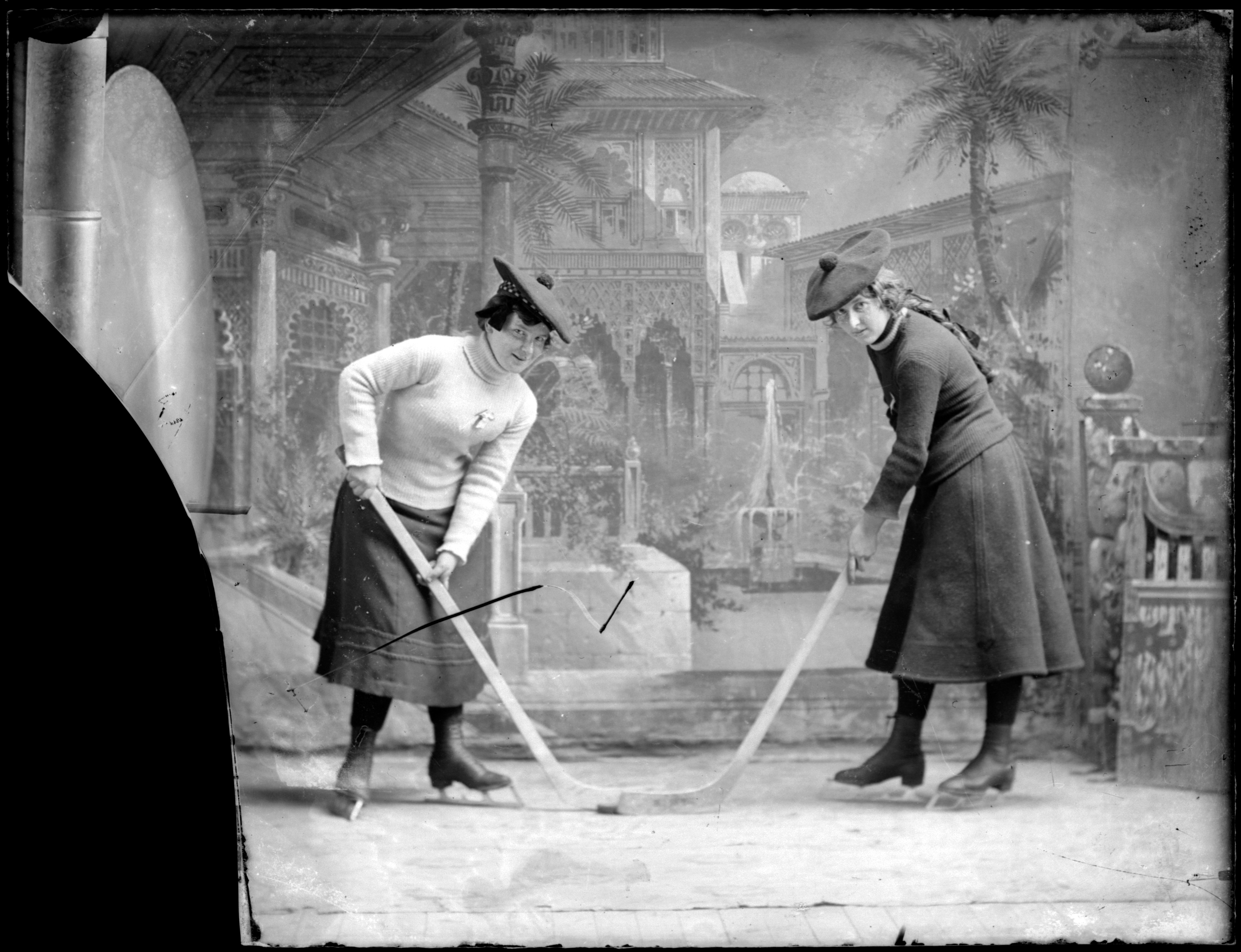
Portrait of two women hockey players facing off with hockey sticks c. 1900

At first, referees in the women's game were male. When women fell to the ice, the male referee was expected to help them get back on their feet. Until 1914, women participating in hockey in Western Canada were expected to wear long skirts.

== Western Canadian history ==
Reporters in Western Canada would refer to women not as hockey players but as fair manipulators of the twisted hickory.

=== Alberta ===
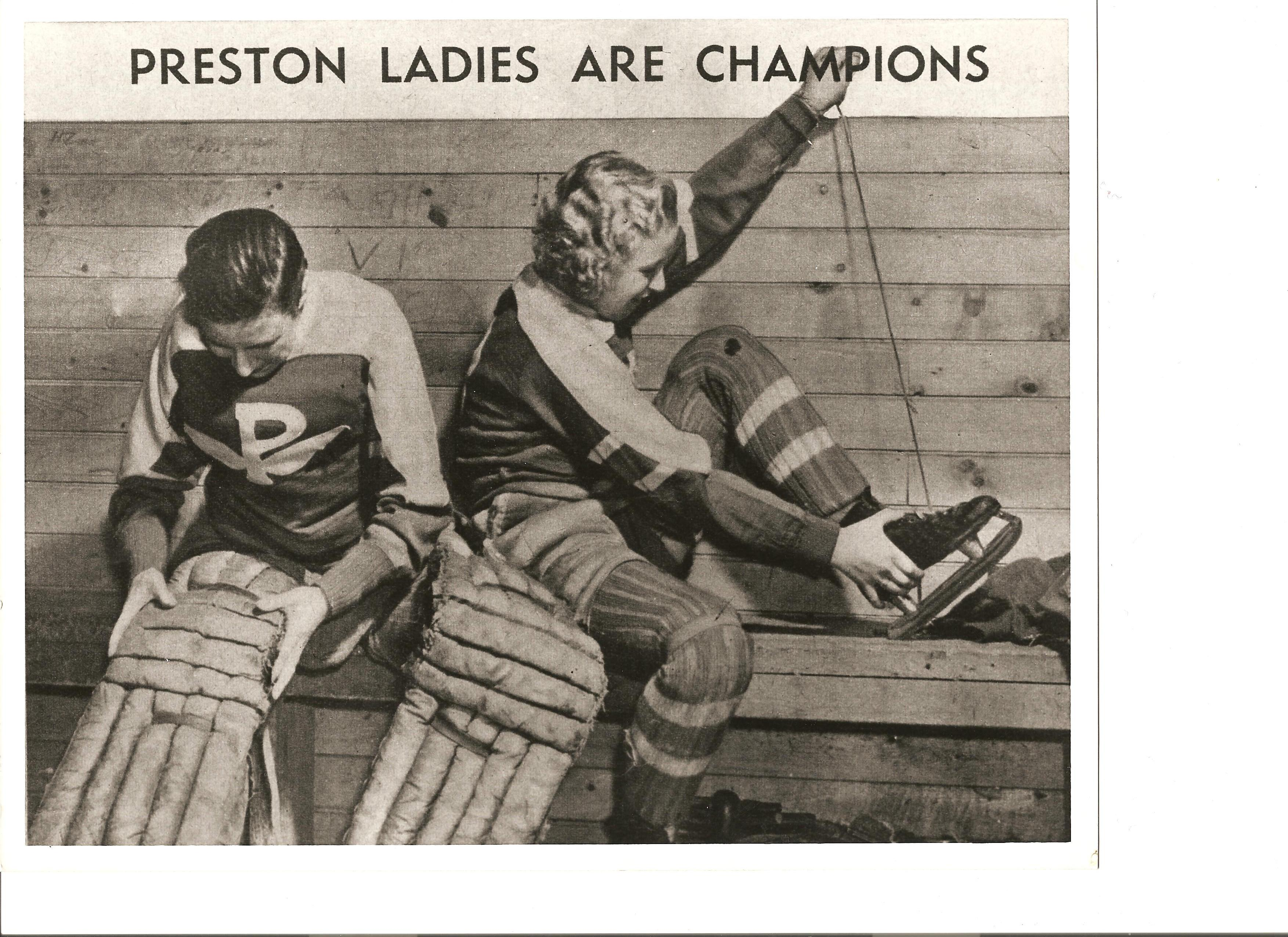
Preston Rivulettes post card Ruth Dargel on right; Nellie Lanscombe on left

The first mention of a women's ice hockey game occurred in Medicine Hat in 1897. Two years later, the Edmonton Ladies Hockey Team was the first Canadian women's hockey team to endorse a commercial product. In an 1899 team photo, the Ladies Club is pictured lacing up Starr Acme Club skates. In the winter of 1937, intergender matches were contested in Alberta. A ladies club from Nanton, Alberta was formed and they defeated a local men's club by a 3–2 score.

In High River, Alberta, a high school girls team was formed. The team played a boys peewee team, also from High River, and this game was won by the boys team.

The Edmonton Rustlers were winners of the 1933 Alpine Cup, and defeated the Preston Rivulettes to become National Champions. It was one of the few times that the Rivulettes ever lost a game as Hazel Case scored the game-winning goal and the Rustlers prevailed by a 3–2 score. In 1934, the Rivulettes were slated to play the Rustlers in a rematch for the national championship, but the Rivulettes were unable to raise the $1800 necessary. By default, the Rustlers were champions.

=== British Columbia ===
Sandor holds the recognition of having the first women's hockey team in the province. The 1900 Rossland Winter Carnival added women's hockey as an event. After 1900, the Rossland Winter Carnival was recognized as hosting the Provincial women's hockey championships. In 1911, the Rossland Carnival final between Rossland and a team from Grand Forks, BC was hailed as the women's championship of the world.

=== Calgary ===
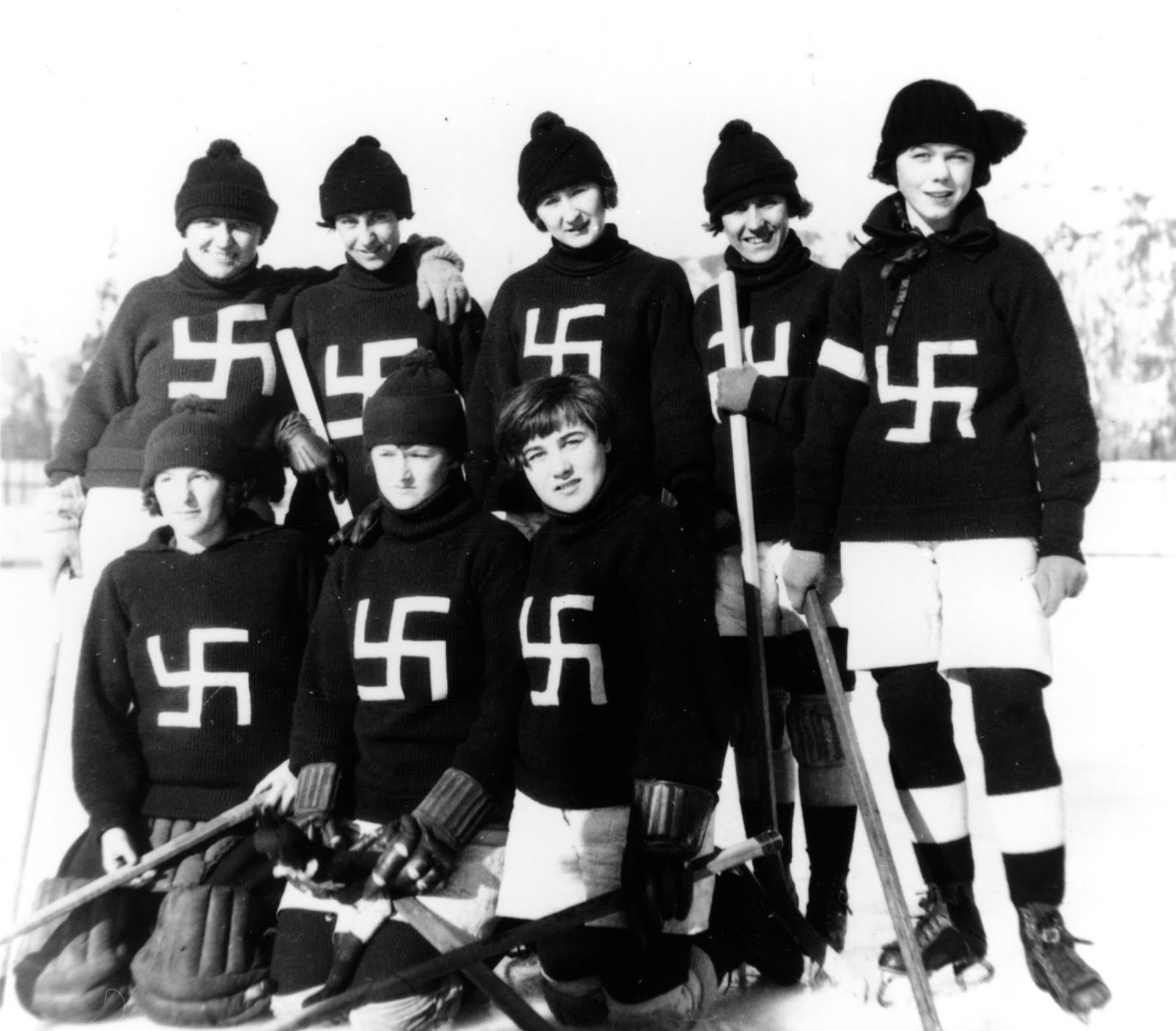
Fernie Swastikas in 1922

Calgary's roots in women's hockey date back to 1908. A Swastika skating club was formed in 1909 (at the time, the swastika was considered a sign of good fortune), and formations of teams in the Calgary Collegiate Institute and Mount Royal College provided women with many opportunities to participate. Calgary's first city team was the Calgary Crescents. The Crescents played teams from Red Deer, Okotoks, Canmore, Banff, and Medicine Hat.

At the 1917 Banff Winter Carnival, the Crescents qualified for the championship game but were defeated by the newly formed Calgary Regents. As Banff carnival champions, the Regents were given the Bernard-Harvey Trophy, which was introduced in the 1917 championship in an attempt to increase the status of the women's competition. It is unclear when the Bernard-Harvey Trophy was later replaced, however, financial accounts of the Alpine Club of Canada indicate that the club paid for a "Carnival Cup" in 1920. Newspaper accounts of what became known as the Alpine Cup did not appear until the winter carnival of 1921. The Crescents would play their final game at the 1918 Banff Carnival and would defeat the Regents. The defeat of the Regents would allow the Edmonton Monarchs to win the tournament.

In 1919, the Calgary Patricias were formed but they were never able to usurp the Calgary Regents as a better team. The Regents would win the Banff Winter Carnival tournament in 1919, 1920 and 1921. In addition, the Regents would go undefeated for four years. In February 1921, the wrote to Canadian Amateur Hockey Association president H. J. Sterling seeking recognition and approval to enter tournaments. He was sympathetic to the cause, but not approval was given and promised to discuss it with other ladies' clubs including Winnipeg and Ottawa. In 1924, the Regents would dissolve and form a new team with some members of the Calgary Byngs Ladies club. The newly formed team was known as the Calgary Holliles, and they actually lost their first game, a 2–0 defeat at the hands of the Calgary Patricias. The Hollies would win four Banff tournaments and be awarded the Alpine Cup.

In mid January 1921, the city of Calgary introduced its own winter carnival to compete with the Banff Winter Carnival. A women's ice hockey game was featured. The Calgary Regents defeated a team from Fernie.

During the 1936–37 season, the Calgary Avenue Grills (named after their sponsor, the Avenue Grill restaurant) were the provincial champions of Alberta. They were scheduled to play the Preston Rivulettes in March 1937 at Maple Leaf Gardens but were prevented to. The Dominion Women's Amateur Hockey Association intervened and ask that the Avenue Grills ladies team join the DWAHA. When the Avenue Grills refused to, a ladies team from Winnipeg was chosen to play the Rivulettes.

== Eastern Canadian history ==
The Eastern Ladies Hockey League, which played their first match on 13 December 1915, were also known as La ligue du hockey des dames de Montréal.

The fastest ice hockey hat trick scored by a woman was done in Canada. The hat trick was scored in 35 seconds. This was accomplished in Canada by Melissa Horvat. At the time, she played for the Burlington 1 Bantams. Said hat trick was scored against Stoney Creek in Burlington, Ontario, on 4 March 2006

=== Maritimes ===
With the involvement of future Olympian Stacy Wilson, various women at Acadia University formed a women's hockey team in 1984. There was no varsity hockey team at the university so the team was a club team. The team wore used Acadia varsity men's hockey sweaters, and raised funds to play in a few tournaments. Wilson and her teammates were part of two Nova Scotia provincial championships. In addition, the Acadia club team represented Nova Scotia at the Women's National Championship in 1986 and 1987.

After Wilson graduated from Acadia University in 1987, she began to play senior women's hockey with the Moncton Blades (later known as the Maritime Blades). New Brunswick did not have a senior women's hockey league, therefore, the Blades were forced to arrange competitive games against men's minor hockey teams and men's old-timer teams. In order to play competitive hockey against other women, the Blades had to travel to Quebec. From 1988 to 1998, the Blades represented New Brunswick at the Women's National Hockey Championship. A member of the women's Team Canada hockey team since the first world championship in 1990, Wilson was also instrumental in launching, with the support of the Canadian Hockey Association (CHA), the first female hockey school in 1995.

== Teams ==
=== Preston Rivulettes ===
The Rivulettes were inducted into the Cambridge Sports Hall of Fame in 1996. Although there is no clear origin, speculation is that an incident occurred in 1930 at Lowther St. Arena. The Preston Rivulettes girls softball team were pondering their future and a member of the team suggested hockey. The story is that an onlooker scoffed at the idea and challenged them. The first nine members of the team were:

- Hilda Ranscombe (top-scoring right winger)
- Nellie Ranscombe (goalie)
- Marm and Helen Schmuck
- Marg Gabbitass
- Myrtle Parr
- Toddy Webb
- Pat Marriott
- Helen Sault.

The Rivulettes played teams from Ontario cities such as Toronto, Kitchener, Stratford, London, Hamilton, Guelph and Port Dover. Over the years, other players represented the Rivulettes team. These included: Violet Hall, Sheila Lahey, Gladys Hawkins, Norma Hipel, Ruth Dargel, Elvas Williams, Fay Hilborn, Winnie Makcrow and Eleanor Fairgrieves, Midge Robertson and Marie Bielstein.

Between 1930 and 1940, the team played an estimated 350 games. They lost only two and tied three. For the entire decade of the 1930s, the Rivulettes were the winners of the Bobby Rosenfeld Trophy. The trophy was given to the Ontario champions. In addition, the Rivulettes were six-time winners of the Eastern Canadian championship and the Elmer Doust Cup (the honour for winning the Eastern Canadian championship). The team also won the Lady Bessborough Trophy (given to Canadian Champions) six times.

The Rivulettes were invited to play games in 1939 in Europe, but were unable due to the start of World War II. In 1963, the club was inducted into the Canadian Hockey Hall of Fame.

=== Rossland Ladies hockey team ===
The 1900 Carnival would see the debut of the Rossland Ladies Hockey Team (women could join the team for fifty cents, while men would be given an honorary membership for the same fee). Rossland played a ladies team from Nelson and won the game by a score of 4–0. One of Rossland's most notable players was Eva Blackman. She would play numerous positions over the year including goaltender. At the 1905 Carnival, no one would challenge Rossland, so the team split into two teams and played each other. The teams were known as the Reds and the Blues. Rossland's biggest upset came in 1917 when the club were defeated a ladies team from Grand Forks for the West Kootenay Championship.

=== Vancouver Amazons ===
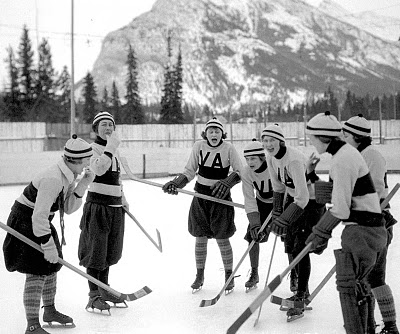
Vancouver Amazons in Banff Alberta

The Vancouver Amazons were a women's hockey team from the 1920s. They were the first women's hockey team from Vancouver to participate in the invitational women's hockey tournament sponsored by the Banff Winter Carnival. The Amazons competed in 1921. The Amazons qualified for the final that year but were defeated. The team was owned by Frank Patrick, who also owned the Vancouver Millionaires. Patrick would organize a tournament featuring the Amazons, the Seattle Vamps and the Victoria Kewpies. The Amazons went undefeated in the tournament and did not allow a goal. The Amazons were West Coast Women's champions. As the tournament featured a team from the United States, many consider this the first ever international women's hockey competition. At the Banff tournament in 1922, Elizabeth Hinds, became the first woman from British Columbia to score a hat trick in a game Phebe Senkler was captain of the Amazons and her sister Norah played on defence. The forwards were Kathleen Carson and Nan Griffith, while the goaltender was Amelia Voitkevic. The bench featured Lorraine Cannon and Mayme Leahy.

The Amazons qualified for the 1922 final and played the Calgary Regents. In the third period, the Amazons were down 1–0, and Kathleen Carson tied the game. Carson would score the game-winning goal in overtime and were awarded the Alpine Cup.

=== Ottawa Alerts ===
The Alerts began play in 1915, taking advantage of the downturn in men's hockey due to the First World War. The team became popular, drawing thousands of fans. In 1917, the team travelled to Pittsburgh and defeated the Polar Milk Maids in a three-game "world series". In 1922, they joined the Ladies Ontario Hockey Association and won the Association's first championship title in 1923.

== Associations ==
=== LOHA ===
On 16 December 1922, a meeting was held to announce the Ladies Ontario Hockey Association was formed. The organization was structured similarly to the Ontario Women's Softball Association in which women would run the organization but men served in an advisory capacity. During the 16 December meeting, Frank McEwen, president of the Toronto Hockey League, presided over the meeting. Members from ladies clubs in London, Ontario and St. Thomas, Ontario were present. A letter from the Ottawa Alerts ladies club was presented, indicating their interest to join.

In 1923, Janet Allen was the first female to be elected LOHA president. In autumn of 1923, the LOHA suffered a setback when the Canadian Amateur Hockey Association held a meeting in Port Arthur. The Association voted not to give women official recognition as hockey players. In 1927, LOHA president Janet Allen, and LOHA treasurer Bobbie Rosenfeld attended the 38th meeting of the Ontario Hockey Association and asked the OHA to help endorse the league. In the process, they announced that if the OHA would help boost its membership, the LOHA would create a provincial championship for its member teams.

The Preston Rivulettes would join the LOHA in 1931. Although their early success would promote women's hockey, by 1938, their later success would prove to be an organization challenge to the LOHA governing body. From 1931 to 1935, the Rivulettes were undefeated and won five consecutive provincial championships.

Many ladies teams in Ontario did not want to join the LOHA because they felt they had no chance of winning. The Rivulettes success caused the number of member teams to decrease. The decision was for the LOHA to create an A League and a B League. The B League would include first year teams, and teams that were not at a high skill level. LOHA president Bobbie Rosenfeld found it to be the only way to increase the number of member teams.

In 1939, new LOHA president Roxy Atkins appealed to past OHA president Dudley to promote the LOHA B League. Atkins wanted Dudley to help increase membership by encouraging ladies teams from Northwestern and Western Ontario to join. Despite the appeal, by 1941, the LOHA was dissolved and it amalgamated with the Ontario branch of the Women's Amateur Athletic Federation.

=== Dominion Women's Amateur Hockey Association ===
The Dominion Women's Amateur Hockey Association (DWAHA) was founded in winter 1933. Lady Bessborough, the wife of Governor General of Canada Lord Bessborough donated a championship trophy. The trophy would be contested between the Edmonton Rustlers and the Preston Rivulettes. Presidents of the DWAHA were Myrtle Cook-McGowan before 1937, Bobbie Rosenfeld from 1937 to 1939, and Mary Dunn in 1940.

The DWAHA sought to grow its membership to include all provinces in Canada, and to use the national playoffs for the Lady Bessborough Trophy to raise funds and increase the profile of women's hockey in Canada. The DWAHA wanted to showcase its talents by sending an all-star team to Europe to play against teams in France and England; and to petition the Canadian Olympic Committee and the International Olympic Committee for women's hockey to be a demonstration sport at the 1940 Winter Olympics.

=== OWHA ===
The Ontario Women's Hockey Association was founded in 1975 to support the development of the women's game and generate interest in the sport. The OWHA was instrumental in organizing a national women's tournament, which began in 1982, and in hosting the first women's world tournament in 1987.

== Professional ==
=== Canadian Women's Hockey League ===
The Canadian Women's Hockey League (CWHL), preceded by the NWHL and COWHL, was formed in 2007. Teams competed for the Clarkson Cup, donated by former Canadian Governor General Adrienne Clarkson. From 2007 to 2017, the players did not earn a salary, but their travel time, uniforms, equipment and coaches were covered by the league. Jayna Hefford became the first player in the CWHL to record 100 career points. She recorded the record-setting point milestone on 17 January 2009, in a win over the Montreal Stars. On 12 August 2010, the league hosted its first draft, following a reorganization of the league, held at the Hockey Hall of Fame in Toronto. The first overall selection was former Ohio State hockey player and Olympic gold medalist Tessa Bonhomme.

A new National Women's Hockey League, launched in 2015 in the United States, was the first women's league to pay a salary. In the 2017–18 and 2018–19 seasons, the CWHL began paying a small stipend to the players as well following an expansion of the league with two Chinese teams. In 2019, the CWHL ceased operations, citing unsustainable business operations.

=== National Women's Hockey League ===
The National Women's Hockey League (NWHL), based in the United States, began in 2015 as the first professional women's hockey league to pay a base salary for all players. Funding for the new league came from sponsorship and donations, with each team initially receiving approximately $270,000 as a salary cap. The salary attracted some Canadian players such as Kelly Babstock. The league ran into financial issues during its second season leading to the league cutting salaries by half. After the dissolution of the CWHL in 2019, the NWHL announced its intentions of placing expansion teams in Toronto and Montreal. The Toronto Six became the first Canadian expansion team, joining the league for the 2020–21 season. However, in 2019 hundreds of prominent women's players, including Canadian and American Olympians, founded the Professional Women's Hockey Players' Association (PWHPA) and opted to boycott existing leagues, including the NWHL, in pursuit of a unified, financially stable professional league.

=== Professional Women's Hockey League ===
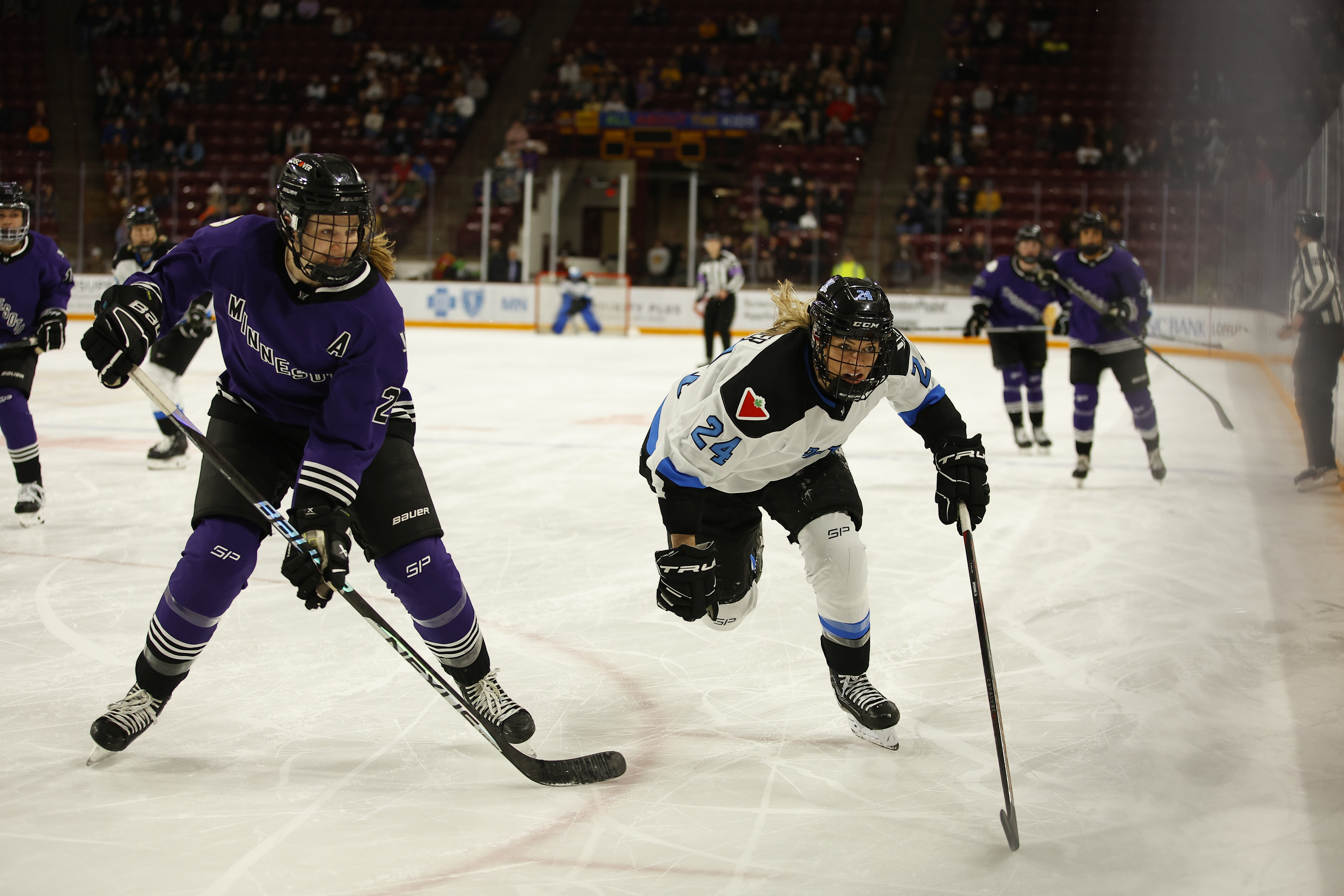
Olympic champion Natalie Spooner (right) races Lee Stecklein (left) to the puck in a Professional Women's Hockey League game

The goal of the PWHPA was achieved in 2023, when the formation of the Professional Women's Hockey League (PWHL) was announced. That year, the NWHL—rebranded as the Premier Hockey Federation in 2021—was purchased and ultimately dissolved as part of the foundation of the new league. The move had the financial backing of Mark Walter and Billie Jean King. The new league established six charter franchises with three of them in Canada in Toronto, Ottawa, and Montreal. The league debuted in 2024 with a New Year's Day match hosted at the old Maple Leaf Gardens between Toronto and New York. The following day, a match between Ottawa and Montreal drew a record crowd for a professional women's game with 8,318 in attendance. That record was broken on 16 February 2024, at Toronto's Scotiabank Arena, with 19,825.

== Players ==
Women's Ice Hockey in Canada had 85,624 players in 2010. Some well-known players include:

- Albertine Lapensée, also known as the "Miracle Maid", was widely regarded as the first female hockey superstar in Canada in the early 1900s.
- Hilda Ranscombe played hockey in the Great Depression. She was considered the equivalent of many men. Besides hockey, she played baseball for a team called the Preston Rivulettes, that would later become a hockey team of that same name. Before her death, Ranscombe donated all her equipment to the Hockey Hall of Fame in Toronto.
- Shirley Cameron was a founding member of the Edmonton Chimos in 1972. She played in the first IIHF Women's World Championships (played in 1990). Cameron competed in 16 Canadian championships with the Chimos. After 1992, she became a coach. Two of Alberta's women's hockey teams, the Chimos and the Calgary Oval X-Treme play a ten-game series, and the winner gets a trophy named in Cameron's honour: the Cameron Cup.
- Angela James, one of the first superstars of modern women's hockey, led Seneca College to multiple national collegiate titles. James also led Canada to gold medal finishes at the first international women's tournaments in 1987 and 1990.
- Hayley Wickenheiser is widely regarded as one of the greatest hockey players of all-time. She was the first to play full-time professional hockey in a men's league, and is the all-time leading scorer for women's hockey at the Winter Olympics.
- Marie-Philip Poulin scored the gold-medal winning goal for Canada at three different Olympics, and captained the team to gold at the 2022 Olympics.

== Figures ==
=== Fran Rider ===
Fran Rider was the founding executive director of the Ontario Women's Hockey Association when it was formed in 1975. She would eventually become its president and CEO, and was instrumental in organizing the national women's championship, which launched in 1982, and the first world women's tournament in 1987. She continued to lobby for the international women's game and pushed for an IIHF-sanctioned world tournament, which was achieved in 1990, and for women's hockey to be included at the Winter Olympics, which was achieved in 1998. In 2015, Rider was inducted into the IIHF Hall of Fame in 2015 in recognition of her substantial impact on the growth and development of the modern game of women's hockey. The Fran Rider Cup is named after her, and was formerly awarded to the second-place team in the national championships. Rider was the first female recipient of the Canadian Amateur Hockey Association's Award of Merit.

=== Sylvia Romanelli ===
In 1986, Sylvia Romanelli became the first female president of a boys minor hockey association. Sylvia Romanelli had been the manager of a boys minor hockey team for 4 years prior to being nominated and voted in as president of the Woodbridge minor hockey association. Sylvia was the first to introduce participant trophies in the organization in 1974. She was also the first to have regular scheduled exhibition games with GTHL teams. Sylvia was fully responsible for bringing the first OMHA team to Europe for a 2-week tour of 4 countries. She managed her boys 1986 hockey team to an all Ontario championship.

=== Samantha Holmes ===
Samantha Holmes played for the Canadian National women's team from 2000 to 2005. Her part in women's hockey history was related to an activist role. As a child she attended the 1988 Winter Games in Calgary. Upon her arrival, she was disappointed to learn that there would not be a women's hockey tournament. After the games she began a letter writing campaign to get women involved in women's ice hockey. She began by writing a letter to her local newspaper. She proceeded by writing to Mississauga mayor Hazel McCallion, Canadian Prime Minister Brian Mulroney, and IOC President Juan Antonio Samaranch.

She moved to Calgary in June 2002 and played hockey for the Calgary Oval X-Treme. She competed in two international tournaments for her country, but never participated in the Olympics. After she left the Oval X-Treme, she formed her own team. Her team was the Strathmore Rockies and they joined the Western Women's Hockey League. The idea stemmed from the fact that there were many elite hockey players in Calgary, but not all of them had the opportunity to play for the Oval X-Treme. Holmes also handled the day-to-day tasks of running the Strathmore team. Part of her accomplishments included player scouting, sponsorship and marketing campaigns to operate the team. She is also captain of the Rockies and a graduate of the University of New Hampshire. Holmes runs local skills clinics in Calgary for young women's players.

=== Hazel McCallion ===
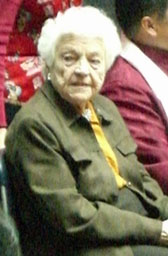
Hazel McCallion

Hazel McCallion was well known in Canada for her love of hockey. She played for a professional women's team while attending school in Montreal. McCallion started playing hockey in the late 1920s in the town of Port Daniel, Quebec. She played with her two sisters and was a forward on their team. McCallion later played hockey for $5 a game in the city of Montreal. The team was sponsored by Kik Cola and it was a three team women's league. At one time, she was a board member of the Ontario Women's Hockey League, and was instrumental in getting the Hershey Centre built for the city of Mississauga. McCallion provided assistance for Don Cherry's group to bring an Ontario Hockey League franchise to the city in 1998, and she was instrumental in bringing the IIHF Women's World Hockey Championships to the city in 2000. McCallion also sits on the OWHA Board of Regents.

=== Maureen McTeer ===
Maureen McTeer is married to former Canadian prime minister Joe Clark. She was raised in Ottawa, to John and Bea McTeer. McTeer's father taught her and her older sister, Colleen, to play hockey, resulting in McTeer's childhood dream of playing in the NHL. Her commitment to feminism and eagerness to combat stereotypes was born when her father reminded her that girls did not play in the NHL.

In 1982, McTeer and athlete Abby Hoffman were among the organizers of the Esso Women's Nationals championship tournament for women's ice hockey. One of the tournament's trophies, the Maureen McTeer Trophy, is named for her. It is awarded to the team that finishes in third place at the Esso Nationals.

=== Justine Blainey ===
In 1981, Justine Blainey won a spot on a Metro Toronto Hockey League Team (MTHL) but was denied the chance to play. This denial was attributed to MTHL regulations that did not permit women in the league. Blainey addressed a complaint to the Human Rights Commission but the Ontario Human Rights Code specifically allowed sexual discrimination in sports. Blainey chose to appeal the Ontario law, and she endured five different court cases before finally having her case heard by the Supreme Court of Canada in 1986. Blainey played for the Toronto Lady Blues women's ice hockey program in the 1990s and assumed another activist role. In 1993, (although the Lady Blues won 13 of the last 15 provincial championships), a task force recommended that the University of Toronto cut the team for financial reasons. Blainey, a member of the team, organized a "Save the Team" night that raised over $8,000. She personally called 100 alumni during a one-week fundraising blitz.

=== Patrick family ===
In the fall of 1907, the Patrick Family (consisting of five children, including future Hockey Hall of Fame members Frank and Lester Patrick) relocated to Nelson, British Columbia. By 1910, the Patrick family would influence the Nelson Ladies Hockey Club. Myrtle, Cynda and Dora Patrick were all involved with the club. There were so many members, that the club was split into two teams: the Stirlings and the Wanderers. In 1911, the Nelson Ladies Club was coached by Lester Patrick, and Dora was the captain. Once again, the team would eventually split into two smaller teams: the Cubs and the Athletics. After 1911, the Patrick family left Nelson and moved to Victoria. The Nelson Ladies Club would continue until 1916, but would lose to the Rossland team every year.

== Historical games ==
- On 11 February 2000, the Ontario University Athletics women's ice hockey program saw its longest game take place. The University of Toronto's Rhonda Mitchell scored on a 35-foot slap shot. It was the 5:07 mark of the eighth period and the Varsity Blues defeated York University. Although the victory allowed the U of T to advance to the OUA gold medal game, it was the longest in the history of Canadian women's hockey (since broken). The game lasted over five hours and ten minutes. York's player of the game was goaltender Debra Ferguson, as she valiantly made 63 saves over 125 minutes.
- 3 March 2011: A postseason match between the Queen's Golden Gaels and the Guelph Gryphons became the longest collegiate hockey game, male or female, Canadian or American — on record. The match began on Wednesday and it only ended on Thursday. The duration of the match was 167 minutes and 14 seconds when Queen's forward Morgan McHaffie placed a rebound past Gryphons goalie Danielle Skoufranis.
- On 26 August 2011, 40 women participated in the Longest Ice Hockey Game 4 CF, at Canlan Ice Sports Burnaby 8 Rinks in Burnaby, British Columbia. The goal was to play for the next 10 days as they attempted to set a new Guinness World Record for playing the longest hockey game while also raising funds and awareness for the Canadian Cystic Fibrosis Foundation.
- On 2 January 2024, a Professional Women's Hockey League game between Ottawa and Montreal at TD Place Arena drew 8,318 fans, which set a new attendance record for professional women's hockey.

== Famous Firsts ==
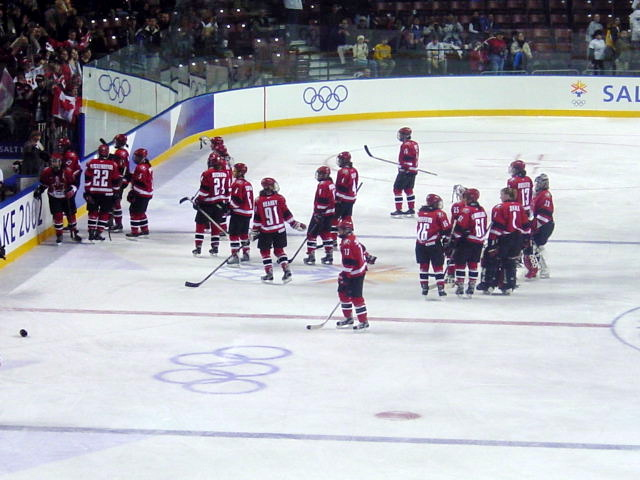
The Canadian women's ice hockey team leaves the ice after a game against Kazakhstan at the 2002 Winter Olympics

- In 1992, Manon Rhéaume became the first woman to play in a National Hockey League game, playing an exhibition game for the Tampa Bay Lighting versus the St. Louis Blues. Rhéaume played another exhibition game with the Lighting in 1993.
- Lesley Reddon was part of the 1994–95 UNB Varsity Reds men's team and became the first female goaltender to play in the Atlantic Universities Hockey Conference.
- In 2002, at the age of 16, Shannon Szabados became the first female to play in the Western Hockey League. Szabados played in four exhibition games for the Tri-City Americans. On 22 September 2002, she played 20 seconds of a regular season game.
- In 2003, Hayley Wickenheiser became the first woman to play full-time men's professional hockey when she debuted in the Finnish third league with HC Salamat; she would become the first woman to record a point in a professional men's game, and recorded 10 assists in 23 games.
- 15 November 2003: Kim St. Pierre was the first woman in CIS history to be credited with a win in a men's regular season game. This occurred when the McGill Redmen defeated the Ryerson Rams by a score of 5–2.
- Catherine White scored the first goal in the history of the Canadian National Women's Under 18 program on 23 August 2007, in Ottawa.

== Timeline of Events ==
- 1902: In 1902, a challenge match was held between the Ladies Hockey Clubs of Trois Rivieres and Montreal. At the time, it was hailed as the national championship of Canada as there were no organized leagues or tournaments.
- 1914: The first provincial championship in Ontario was held in 1914 in Picton. Six teams competed in the event.
- 1982: The Abby Hoffman Cup was introduced at the first Canadian National Women's Hockey Championship.
- 1987: Toronto hosts the 1987 World Women's Hockey Tournament, the unofficial first women's world hockey championship. The championship trophy was named the Hazel McCallion World Cup, in honor of Mississauga mayor Hazel McCallion.
- 1990: Ottawa hosts the first official (IIHF-sanctioned) Women's World Hockey Championship. The European teams came to the event at their own personal expenses. The Canadian team wore pink sweaters and pink socks. TSN and RDS broadcast the game across Canada. The Canadian team beat the United States by a score of 5–2.
- 1998: Women's hockey debuts at the Nagano Winter Olympics.
- 2024: The debut of the Professional Women's Hockey League, the first unified North American professional women's league, with a New Year's Day game between Toronto and New York in Toronto.

== Tournaments ==
The OWHA lobbied for a national championship for women. The first Canadian national women's championship was in 1982 and the first corporate sponsor of the event was Shoppers Drug Mart.

=== Banff Winter Carnival ===
The following is a list of all the champion's from the Banff Winter Carnival. The Banff Winter Carnival organizers were known to pay each team up to twenty-five percent of gate receipts to help cover team expenses. In later years, the Carnival would guarantee travel expenses for the competing teams.

Year	Winner
1917	Calgary Regents
1918	Edmonton Monarchs
1919	Calgary Regents
1920	Calgary Regents
1921	Calgary Regents
1922	Vancouver Amazons
1923	Fernie Swastikas
1924	Calgary Hollies
1925	Calgary Hollies
1926	Edmonton Monarchs
1927	Calgary Hollies
1928	Calgary Hollies
1929	Edmonton Monarchs
1930	Edmonton Monarchs
1931	Edmonton Monarchs
1932	Edmonton Monarchs
1933	Edmonton Rustlers
1934	Red Deer Amazons
1935	Red Deer Amazons

=== Canada Winter Games ===
Year	Gold	Silver	Bronze	4th	5th	6th	7th	8th	9th	10th	11th
1991	Alberta	BC	Quebec	Ontario	Manitoba	Saskatchewan	New Brunswick	Nova Scotia	Prince Edward Island	Newfoundland	
1995	Ontario	Saskatchewan	Quebec	Manitoba	Alberta	BC	New Brunswick	Nova Scotia	Prince Edward Island	Newfoundland	
1999	Ontario	Quebec	Alberta	Saskatchewan	BC	Nova Scotia	Manitoba	Newfoundland	Prince Edward Island	New Brunswick	
2003	Ontario	Quebec	Saskatchewan	Manitoba	Nova Scotia	BC	Alberta	Prince Edward Island	Newfoundland	New Brunswick	Yukon
2007	Ontario	Manitoba	Quebec	Saskatchewan							
2011	Alberta	Ontario	Quebec	Saskatchewan	Manitoba	British Columbia	Prince Edward Island	Nova Scotia	New Brunswick	Newfoundland	Yukon

The following were players who participated in the Canada Winter Games women's hockey tournament and would go on to represent Canada in ice hockey at the Winter Olympics

Player	Team	Year
Meghan Agosta	Team Ontario	2003 (gold medal)
Cassie Campbell	Team Ontario	1991 (fourth place)
Nancy Drolet	Team Quebec	1991 (third place)
Jayna Hefford	Team Ontario	1995 (gold medal)
Haley Irwin	Team Ontario	2003 (gold medal)
Rebecca Johnston	Team Ontario	2007
Gina Kingsbury	Team Quebec	1995, 1999
Charline Labonte	Team Québec	1999
Caroline Ouellette	Team Quebec	1995
Cherie Piper	Team Ontario	1999
Colleen Sostorics	Team Saskatchewan	1995
Tammy Shewchuk	Team Québec	1991 and 1995
Sami Jo Small	Team Manitoba	1991
Sarah Vaillancourt	Team Québec	2003
Catherine Ward	Team Québec	2003
Hayley Wickenheiser	Team Alberta	1991 (gold medal)

=== Lipstick tournament ===
The roots of the Lipstick Tournament can be traced to Wallaceburg, Ontario, resident Grace Small. In early 1966, she requested that arena manager Harold Ribson allow some ice time for teenage girls. Ribson agreed while Gus Lalonde and Doug Myers agreed to coach the local group of teenage girls. After a few games, Ribson arranged a one-day girls tournament, contested on 27 February 1966.

Although this was not the first Lipstick Tourney, eleven women's teams participated. Under Wally Enterprises CEO Jack Lacey, a championship shield was provided for the tournament. The Six Nations girls team won the championship and were declared Ontario champions, as sanctioned by the Ontario Athletic Commission office. Harold Ribson saw the potential of the concept. It was not only an opportunity for female hockey competition but a way to promote the city of Wallaceburg. Ribson (along with Terry Brodeur) selected the Valentine's Day 1967 weekend as the date for the first Lipstick Tournament.

Entries from sixteen teams were accepted and it involved 256 players from Ontario and Michigan. Jean Walker, who had played in the early 20th century, from Chippewa, ON, dropped the puck at the ceremonial face off. Jack Adams, general manager of the NHL's Detroit Red Wings attended, along with retired Detroit Red Wings netminder Johnny Mowers.

In addition, Ribson arranged for the Hockey Night in Canada TV production crew to visit Wallaceburg on Friday night to play an exhibition game with the local Wallaceburg Hornettes women's team. Broadcaster Ward Cornell and Toronto Maple Leafs broadcaster Bill Hewitt attended. TV clips were shown between periods the following night on Hockey Night in Canada. Jack Lacey became involved again as he supplied a set of custom-painted pink-coloured hockey sticks to the Hornettes for use in the tournament. also donated trophies for top scorer, most valuable player and best goaltender. The Port Huron entry won the inaugural 1967 Lipstick Tournament. The second Lipstick Tourney in 1968 was affected by a devastating flood that hit the community in February. The tourney did continue with 16 entries. Hilda Ranscombe from Preston, a member of the 1935 Preston Rivulettes, Canadian champions was the guest of honour. Marian Coveny, who would later play for Team Canada, made one of several appearances in the tournament. Of note, the 1968 tournament would be the last tourney organized by Harold and Lila Ribson. The Wallaceburg Jaycees came forth and volunteered to convene the following Lipstick Tourney as a fund raiser.

The Lipstick Tourney was on a strong footing with the Jaycees at the helm and by 1975, the tournament grew to 21 teams. Over 4,500 fans total attended games in 1975, as the tournament was tied to other events that involved Wallaceburg's centennial. Mary Lou Atkins, coach of the first Hornettes team, dropped the puck at the ceremonial face off. Wallaceburg did not enter a team every year due to members leaving for further education and marriage. By 1978, the new local entry was the Knights of Pythias Hawks. In 1980, 28 teams were accepted into the tourney, resulting in some games competed in Dresden. Teams from as far away as Boston and Edmonton competed in the tournament. In 1985, the local entry was called Vanatters Panthers with Dina Celotto the MVP and Lynn McCreary, top goaltender. The last Lipstick Tourney of the 20th Century was held in 1993. In 2006 a group of local parents led by Lynn Vanderveeken revived the Lipstick Tourney.

== Awards ==
=== Abby Hoffman Cup ===
The Abby Hoffman Cup was introduced in 1982 at the first Canadian National Women's Hockey Championship known as the "Shopper's Drug Mart Women's Nationals. The event was held in Brantford, Ontario and the Ontario Women's Hockey Association presented the trophy.

Year	Winner	Province
2008–09	Westman Wildcats	Manitoba
2007–08	Team Manitoba	Manitoba
2006–07	Calgary Oval X-Treme	Alberta
2005–06	Team Ontario	Ontario
2004–05	Team Ontario	Ontario
2003–04	Team Ontario	Ontario
2002–03	Team Alberta	Alberta
2001–02	Equipe Quebec	Quebec
2000–01	Calgary Oval X-Treme	Alberta
1999–00	Beatrice Aeros	Ontario
1998–99	Equipe Quebec	Quebec
1997–98	Calgary Oval X-Treme	Alberta
1996–97	Edmonton Chimos	Alberta
1995–96	Equipe Quebec	Quebec
1994–95	Equipe Quebec	Quebec
1993–94	Equipe Quebec	Quebec
1992–93	Toronto Aeros	Ontario
1991–92	Edmonton Chimos	Alberta
1990–91	Toronto Aeros	Ontario
1989–90	Sherbrooke	Quebec
1988-89	Sherbrooke	Quebec
1987-88	Sherbrooke	Quebec
1986-87	Hamilton Hawks	Ontario
1985-86	Hamilton Hawks	Ontario
1984-85	Edmonton Chimos	Alberta
1983-84	Edmonton Chimos	Alberta
1982-83	Burlington Ladies	Ontario
1981–82	Agincourt Canadians	Ontario

=== Angela James Bowl ===
- The Angela James Bowl was awarded to the highest scoring player in the now defunct Canadian Women's Hockey League.

Season	Winner	Team	Pts	Win #
2007–08	Jennifer Botterill	Mississauga Chiefs	61	1
2008–09	Jayna Hefford	Brampton Canadette-Thunder	69	1
2009–10	Sabrina Harbec	Montreal Stars	54	1
2010–11	Caroline Ouellette	Montreal Stars	68	1
2011–12	Meghan Agosta	Montreal Stars	80	1
2012–13	Meghan Agosta	Montreal Stars	46	2
2013-14	Ann-Sophie Bettez	Montreal Stars	40	1
2014-15	Rebecca Johnston	Calgary Inferno	37	1
2015-16	Marie-Philip Poulin	Les Canadiennes	46	1
2016-17	Jess Jones Marie-Philip Poulin	Brampton Thunder Les Canadiennes	37 37	1 2
2017-18	Kelli Stack	Kunlun Red Stars WIH	49	1
2018-19	Marie-Philip Poulin	Les Canadiennes	50	3

=== Isobel Gathorne Hardy Award ===
Lady Isobel Gathorne-Hardy's role as a pioneer of women's ice hockey in Canada is acknowledged with the Isobel Gathorne-Hardy Award. The award is given to an active player (at any level) whose values, leadership and personal traits are representative of all female athletes.

Year	Winner
2000	Linda Irving
2001	Julie Foster
2002	Andria Hunter
2003	Tanya Leone
2004	Jane Legacé
2005	Cathy Phillips
2006	Melanie McFarlane
2007	Karen Mamchuk
2009	Charla Currie
2011	Nancy MacMillan
2012	Jordan Krause
2013	Caroline Ouellette
2014	Lisa-Marie Breton
2015	Mallory Deluce
2016	Toni Ross
2017	Natasha Esquivel
2018	Mackenna Parker
2019	Maggie Connors
2020	Ève Gascon
2021	Marie-Philip Poulin
2022	Mélodie Daoust
2023	Emmy Fecteau

=== Other notable awards ===
- In 1992, Fran Rider won the Gold Stick Award from the Ontario Hockey Association. She was the first woman in forty-five years to have the honor bestowed upon her.
- Hayley Wickenheiser, 2007 Bobbie Rosenfeld Award.
- Cassie Campbell, 2007 Canada Sports Hall of Fame Inductee, (Campbell becomes the first female hockey player inducted into the Hall).
- Geraldine Heaney, 2008 Inductee, International Ice Hockey Federation Hall of Fame.
- Angela James, 2008 Inductee, International Ice Hockey Federation Hall of Fame.
- Angela James, on 22 June 2010, it was announced that she will be inducted into the Hockey Hall of Fame.
- Cassie Campbell, Order of Hockey in Canada
- In 2024, Danielle Serdachny led a powerful goal of 5:16, which resulted in a 6-5 win over the United States and Canada's 13th gold medal.

== See also ==
- History of women's ice hockey in the United States
- U Sports women's ice hockey championship
- Canadian Women's Hockey League (CWHL)
- Western Women's Hockey League (WWHL)
- National Women's Hockey League (1999) (NWHL)
- Clarkson Cup
- History of Canadian sports#Women
