= Doris Parkes =

Canadian athlete

Doris Parkes (born July 22, 1905 in Seattle, Washington) was an athlete that competed in British Columbia in the 1920s and 1930s.

== Sports ==
On July 5, 1910, the Express newspaper had mentioned that Parkes was the winner of a girls' race for 5 years and younger during Dominion Day races at Victoria Park.

From 1926 to 1935, she earned numerous awards for speed skating, cross country skiing, long-distance swimming, high diving and canoeing. Competitions took place in areas such as Hollyburn Mountain, Deep Cove, Dundarave, Vancouver, Princeton, Revelstoke and Banff.

=== Cross Country skiing ===
In the late 1920s and early 1930s, Doris Parkes was one of several women participating in cross country skiing in Hollyburn, British Columbia.

=== Women's ice hockey ===
Parkes was the founder of the second incarnation of the Vancouver Amazons women's ice hockey club. She founded the new version of the team in 1931. This new version of the Amazons competed for the Alpine Cup at the 1931 Banff Winter Carnival. In addition to ice hockey, she also competed in speed skating at the 1931 carnival. Parkes would be elected Queen of the 1932 Banff Winter Carnival.
