= Ice hockey in Canada =

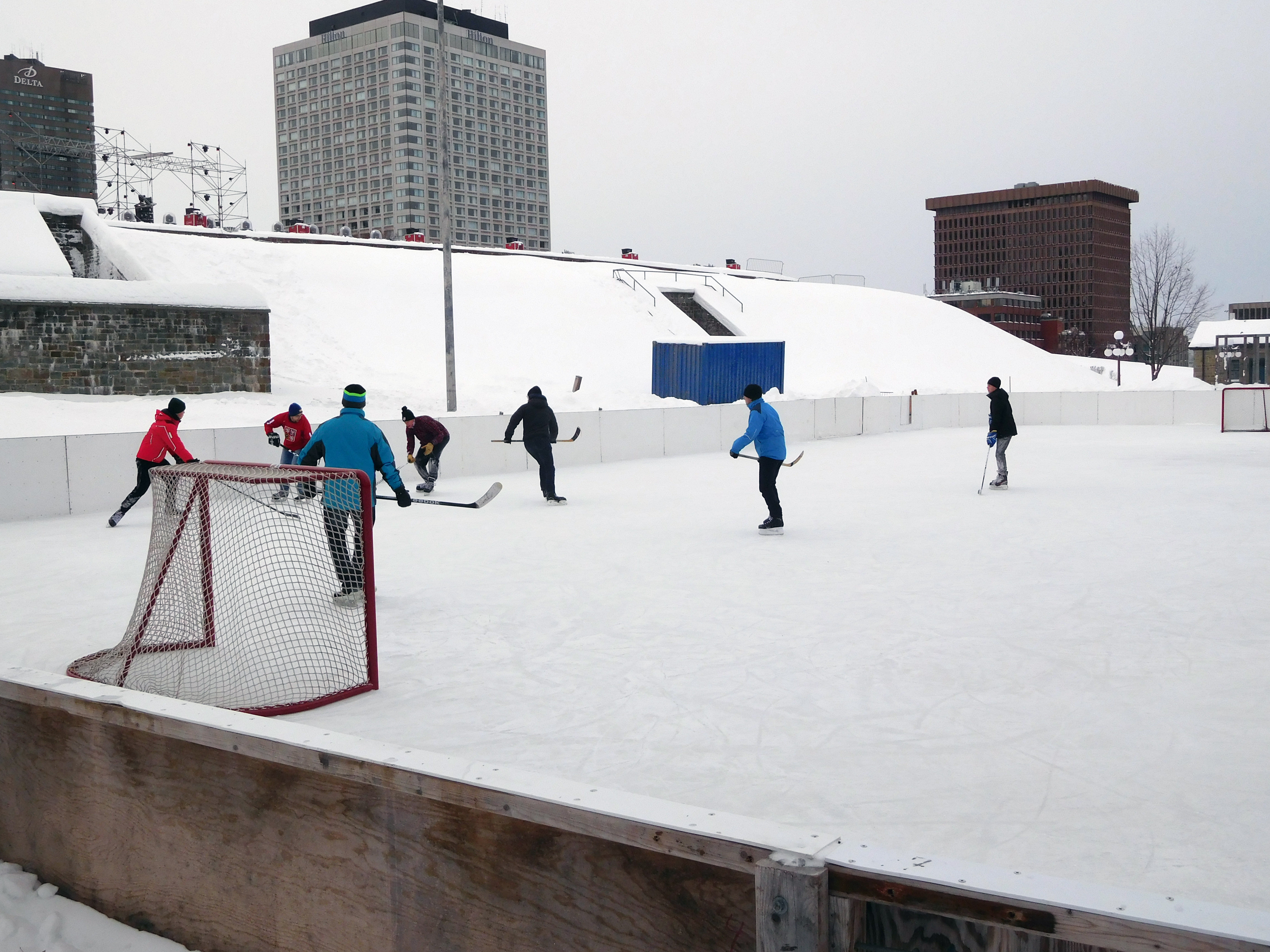
- Skaters playing a game of ice hockey at Esplanade Park in Quebec City
- Country: Canada
- Governing body: Hockey Canada
- National teams: Women's national team; Men's national team
- First played: 1862

National competitions
- Allan Cup; Canada Games; Memorial Cup

Club competitions
- List: Men's: National Hockey League (Major League) American Hockey League (first tier Minor League) ECHL (second tier Minor League) Women's: Professional Women's Hockey League

International competitions
- Winter Olympics; Ice Hockey World Championships; World Women's Championships; Spengler Cup

Ice hockey, simply referred to as "hockey" in both English and French in Canada, dates back to the 19th century. The sport is very popular and played year-round and at every level in the country. Born of various influences from stick-and-ball games brought from the United Kingdom and indigenous games, the contemporary sport of hockey originated in Montreal, Quebec, and Halifax, Nova Scotia. It is the official national winter sport of Canada. Hockey is widely considered Canada's national pastime, with high levels of participation by children, men, and women at various levels of competition. As of 2021, over 15 million people in Canada followed the National Hockey League.

== History ==
The game of ice hockey has its roots in the various stick-and-ball games played over the centuries in the United Kingdom and North America. From prior to the establishment of Canada, Europeans are recorded as having played versions of field hockey and its relatives both on grass and on ice, while the Mi'kmaq indigenous peoples of the Maritimes also had a ball-and-stick game, and made many hockey sticks used by Europeans in the 1800s. Similarly, ice skating team games which eventually became the organized sport of bandy were also played. From these roots, the contemporary sport of hockey was developed in Canada, most notably in Montreal, Quebec, and Halifax, Nova Scotia. Though games of hockey were reported to have been played previously in places like Deline, Northwest Territories, Windsor and Kingston, Ontario, and on Chippewa Creek, in the Niagara region of Ontario, Montreal was the site of the first indoor hockey game recognized by the International Ice Hockey Federation (IIHF). The game was played on March 3, 1875, at the Victoria Skating Rink, organized by James Creighton, a McGill University student from Halifax, using rules imported from the Maritimes. The first commercially made hockey skates were produced in Halifax and the hockey sticks used in the first recognized hockey game were designed jointly by Haligonians and Mi'kmaq. Some characteristics of modern hockey, such as the length of the ice rink and the use of a puck, were developed in that game. Additional technical improvements to that first game came from Nova Scotia, such as the addition of fishing nets and sticks to prop them up replacing stones on the ice as the goal and the introduction of goaltender equipment borrowed from the game of cricket. The rules developed by the Canadians were later adopted by foreign hockey-playing nations.

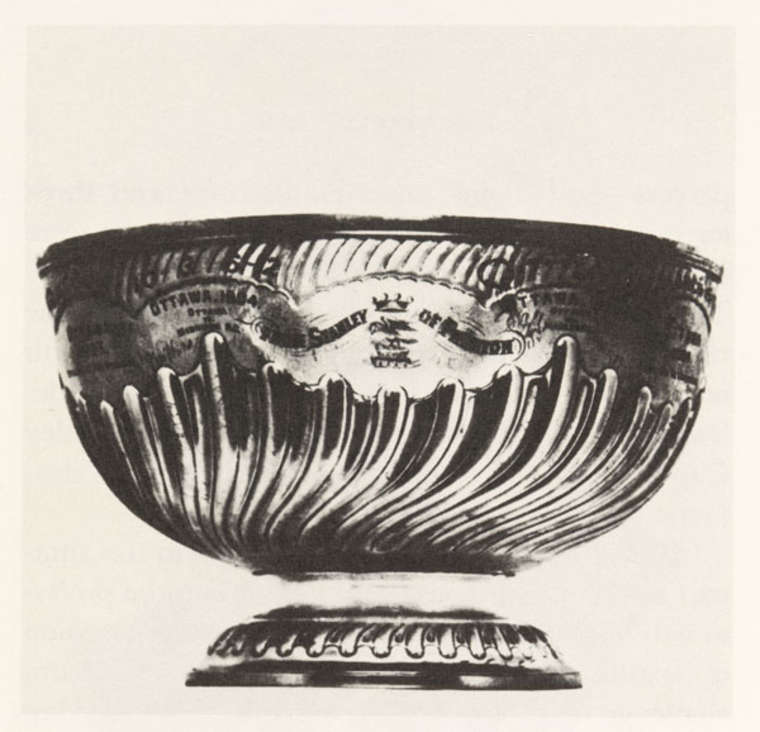
The Stanley Cup in 1893. The trophy was donated by Lord Stanley of Preston, to be awarded to the top hockey team in the country.

Annual championships began in Montreal in the 1880s, leading to the awarding of the Stanley Cup, considered the oldest trophy in North American sports. Lord Stanley of Preston was appointed by Queen Victoria to be the Governor General of Canada on June 11, 1888. While governor general, hockey was still just forming in Canada. He first got to see the game of hockey played at Montreal's 1889 Winter Carnival. During the carnival he watched the Montreal Victorias play the Montreal Hockey Club. Afterwards, Stanley and his family became very involved in the game of hockey. His two sons, Arthur and Algernon, convinced their father to donate a trophy that would be considered to be a visible sign of the hockey championship, which was a silver bowl inlaid with gold. The trophy was first presented in 1893 and was called the Dominion Hockey Challenge Cup. The name of the trophy has since been known as the Stanley Cup.

Professionalism began in the 1890s, with players being paid under the table in various sports, including hockey and lacrosse. By the end of the decade, the predominant amateur league was the Amateur Hockey Association of Canada (ACHA), which Lord Stanley decreed its champions must take part in the cup finals. Dominated by Montreal teams in its early years, the first Western Canada team to mount a challenge were the Winnipeg Victorias. In 1899, the AHCA changed its name to the Canadian Amateur Hockey League. Openly professional leagues emerged after 1900. Early professional play took place in Northern Ontario and in the Maritimes (the Coloured Hockey League) along with leagues in Central and Western Canada. Although many Canadian amateur teams paid their players covertly, most Canadian hockey associations still stuck to the codes of amateurism. Five cities in the United States formed the International Professional Hockey League (IPHL) in 1904. The American-based league was the beginning of professional hockey. The IPHL attracted high-end Canadian players, depriving Canada of some of its best players. The IPHL ceased after three years, but that was long enough to spark the creation of a Canadian-based professional league, the Ontario Professional Hockey League, in 1908. Though some believe the IHL's short existence was due to lack of spectator interest, the primary reason the league failed was a loss of good players back to Canadian teams that by 1906 played in hockey associations, such as the Eastern Canada Amateur Hockey Association, that allowed professionals to play alongside amateurs. The violence of the sport instigated the Ottawa Silver Seven and Montreal Wanderers rivalry of 1907. Newspapers described hockey as a combination of "brutal butchery" and "strenuous spectacle," speaking to public perceptions and different ways of experiencing the game. Ideals of respectable, middle-class masculinity and rough, working-class masculinity co-existed within accounts of fast, skilled, rugged, hard-hitting hockey.

In 1908, Sir Montagu Allan instituted the Allan Cup to be awarded to the best amateur Canadian hockey team, while the Stanley Cup would continue to be awarded to the best Canadian team overall. The National Hockey Association (NHA) was formed in 1910 for professional teams in Eastern Canada, while Lester and Frank Patrick formed the Pacific Coast Hockey Association (PCHA) in Western Canada in 1911. The NHA later morphed into the National Hockey League (NHL) in 1917. In 1917, teams from the PCHA were capable of challenging for the Stanley Cup and in 1918, the Vancouver Millionaires were the first Canadian Pacific team to challenge for the trophy. In 1921, the professional West Coast Hockey League (WCHL) was established and the Victoria Cougars of the WCHL were the first professional Western Canada team to win the award in 1925. However, by 1927, the PCHA and the WCHL were bankrupt and the NHL dominated professional hockey throughout North America. The Montreal Canadiens and Toronto Maple Leafs are two of the NHL's oldest franchises, and its two most successful; the Canadiens have won the Stanley Cup 24 times, and the Maple Leafs 13.

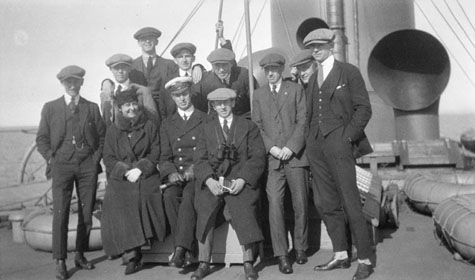
Photo of the gold medal-winning Winnipeg Falcons (along with an unidentified ship officer and woman), taken en route to the 1920 Olympics.

During the 1920s, Winnipeg's senior hockey league champions for the 1919–20 season, the Winnipeg Falcons, featuring Icelandic Canadians, became Canadian national champions and won the 1920 Olympic gold medal for Canada at Antwerp, Belgium. With their devotion to Canada in the First World War, their integration made this team a symbol of Canadian masculinity, unaffected by the ethnic stereotyping and discrimination that affected some other sports teams during the 1920s. During the Great Depression, the Canadian Amateur Hockey Association was forced to re-evaluate its position on amateurism in hockey and to assess its relationship to the amateur sports infrastructure in Canada, which was headed by the Amateur Athletic Union of Canada. The lacklustre performance of the Canadian national hockey team at the 1936 Olympics, over player availability forced radical changes on approaches to how the game was formulated in the country. The Canadian national men's team dominated international amateur play from the 1920s until the early 1950s, when the introduction of state-sponsored national hockey programs, notably from the Soviet Union, began to dominate over the club-based Canadian program. Canada would change to a national team composed of amateurs and eventually withdraw from international senior-level competition in a dispute over the introduction of professionals, considered Canada's best, to counter the dominance and provide an "even playing field" in the eyes of Canadian hockey officials.

In 1971 the professional World Hockey Association (WHA) was formed as a competitor to the NHL, playing in cities in Canada and the United States. Play began in 1972 and in an effort to lure players from the NHL, the WHA promised higher salaries and established franchises in under-served, mid-sized Canadian markets such as Calgary, Edmonton, Ottawa, Quebec City, and Winnipeg. The Avco Cup was awarded to the champion of the league and Winnipeg won the cup in the league's final year in 1979, as the league's teams went bankrupt. Attempts at a merger with the NHL began in 1977, but were derailed mainly by the owner of the Toronto Maple Leafs, Harold Ballard. However, in 1979, after reports of another failure to bring the teams in Edmonton, Quebec City and Winnipeg into the NHL made headlines and the owners of the Montreal Canadiens, Molson Brewery, had been one of the main opponents, a boycott across Canada began against Molson products and violence was directed towards company property in Monteal, Quebec City, and Winnipeg. This forced the Canadian House of Commons to intervene and support a motion urging the NHL to accept the three teams into the NHL. Eventually four of the WHA's franchises were folded into the NHL, including the three from Canada.

In September 1972, Canada's best hockey players from the NHL played the elite amateurs from the Soviet Union in an exhibition series. When Canadian prime minister Pierre Trudeau had met his Soviet counterpart, Alexei Kosygin, in 1971, their discussions included increasing the hockey competitions between the two countries. Soon after, hockey hierarchies of both nations decided on a series of eight games, four to be played across Canada and four in Moscow. For Canadians, the Summit Series was intended to be a celebration of their global supremacy in hockey. The architects of Soviet hockey, on the other hand, had designs on surprising Canada and the world with their skill and claiming the Canadian game as their own. The Summit Series was the catalyst for a re-examination of the Canadian hockey system, organization, coaching, and training methods. The changes in Canadian hockey, along with the acceptance of professional players in international play, would eventually lead to a return to international competition in the 1990s, culminating in Canada's first gold medal victory at the 2002 Winter Olympics in 50 years and repeating the feat at home in Vancouver in 2010.

While professional hockey took the spotlight in Canada, amateur hockey's significance in the nation continued. In 1975, the Canadian Hockey League was created to oversee the amateur major junior hockey teams within Canada, split between the three major junior hockey leagues, the Ontario Hockey League, the Western Hockey League, and the Quebec Maritimes Junior Hockey League. The Canadian leagues, each a descendant of the amateur leagues that spawned in the nascent years of hockey in Canada, provide the transition from minor ice hockey to university and professional leagues. Initially only operating in Canada, the leagues expanded south into the United States. The Canadian university hockey championship, under the governing body of U Sports, was established in 1962 and their trophy, the University Cup was first awarded in 1963. The trophy was renamed the David Johnston University Cup for the former governor general of Canada, David Johnston in 2018.

The Hockey Hall of Fame, located in Toronto, Ontario, is the permanent home of many hockey trophies, including the Stanley Cup. The Hall also honours the greatest hockey players, inducting players annually. Some of the great Canadian hockey players honoured in the Hall include Wayne Gretzky, who holds many NHL scoring records; Maurice Richard, a hero in Quebec; Gordie Howe; and Bobby Orr, among many others.

== National and international competitions ==
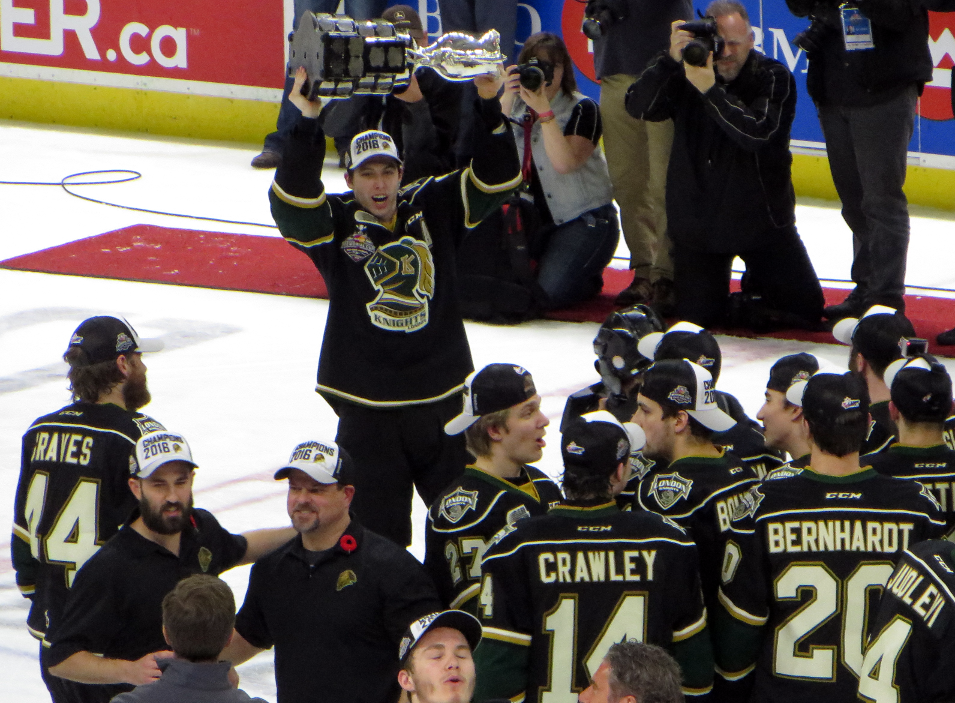
The London Knights celebrate with the Memorial Cup. A major junior hockey club trophy, it is awarded to the Canadian Hockey League champion.

Prominent trophies for national championships in Canada are the Memorial Cup for the top junior-age men's team and the Allan Cup for the top men's senior team. There are national championships in several other divisions of play. Hockey Canada is the sport's official governing body in Canada and is a member of the IIHF. A Canadian national men's team, composed of professionals, competes in the annual IIHF Men's World Championship, the Spengler Cup invitational tournament, and the Olympics. Russia and the United States are considered Canada's major rivals.

== Participation rates ==
Ice hockey is one of the most played sports in the country at the youth level and remains popular for adults whether in organized professional, amateur or recreational leagues. Numerous tournaments are held annually, and hockey games are often part of winter carnivals, and many outdoor ice rinks are constructed for the winter season. In 2010, an estimated 1.3 million Canadian adults participated in hockey, second to golf.

The sport is the third-most popular sport among Canadian children. A 2010 survey estimated that 22% of households have a child playing hockey, while 25% of households have a child playing soccer, and 24% of households have a child participating in swimming. The sport faces increasing competition from other popular sports such as basketball and soccer, which have high participation rates. Another factor facing participation rates is the relative higher cost of hockey equipment. In 2013, the average cost of hockey equipment for youth was estimated at CA$730 while basketball equipment cost $310 and soccer equipment cost $160.

Reports in 2022 saw a significant decline in participation of children in the sport, with Hockey Canada reporting a 35% drop in registration among children under the age of 18, with parents citing the aforementioned rising costs as the reason for not choosing hockey. There was some recovery in 2023 and by 2024, the numbers had reached near pre-pandemic levels, but still trailed tennis and soccer. Furthermore, a shift in populations occurred as the participation rate of self-identifying ethnic players has roughly doubled since 2020.

== Women's ice hockey ==
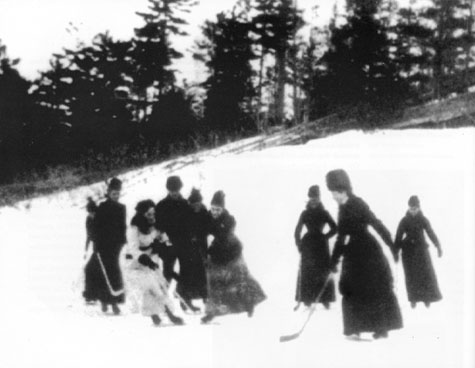
Lady Isobel, daughter of Lord Stanley, plays a game of hockey with other women in Toronto, c. 1888–1893.

Women's hockey in Canada is growing. However, it has a long history dating back to the nineteenth century. Women's shinny games were known to have been organized in Ontario as early as the 1880s, including at the behest of Lady Isobel, daughter of Lord Stanley. Women's hockey proliferated in the early 1900s, particularly at the collegiate level. The First World War provided an early opportunity for growth and a degree of professionalization. In Montreal, investors established the Eastern Ladies Hockey League in 1915, which regularly drew thousands of fans. The league was so popular that, in its first year, it hastily organized two additional teams to bring its total to six teams. Albertine Lapensée emerged as an early star player in this era. In Ottawa, the Alerts women's team found similar success, drawing thousands of fans and winning a "world series" in Pittsburgh over an American team called the Polar Milk Maids. However, the return of professional men's hockey after the war and the onset of the Great Depression together led to a slump in women's hockey, particularly at the professional level. One exception to this trend was the Preston Rivulettes, an Ontario team that dominated women's hockey through the 1930s. The Second World War further set women's hockey back.

A major milestone in the women's game occurred in 1975 with the organization of the Ontario Women's Hockey Association by Fran Rider, which established infrastructure dedicated to growing the women's game. The establishment and success of the Edmonton Chimos women's team in the late 1970s and 1980s further created the impetus for the formation of a national women's championship, which first occurred in 1982.

The women's game then developed significantly at the international stage. In 1987, Rider led organizing the first, unofficial, Women's World Championship, which took place in Toronto and was won by Canada. In 1990, the IIHF organized the first official Women's Worlds, which took place in Ottawa and was again won by Canada. The Canadian national team has been dominant on the international stage, and has formed an enduring rivalry with the United States. Women's hockey was featured at the Winter Olympics for the first time in 1998, and the Canadian and American teams have contested every Olympic final except for 2006, when Canada defeated Sweden in the final. Hayley Wickenheiser and Marie-Philip Poulin are the all-time leading women's Olympic scorers. Canada won the most recent Olympic tournament in 2022.

Top-level and professional women's hockey has developed in starts and stops since the late twentieth century. The National Women's Hockey League (NWHL) launched in 1999, featuring teams mainly in Ontario and Quebec. Some teams from Western Canada competed intermittently, but a Western Women's Hockey League was formed in 2004. From the 2001–02 season to the 2012–13 season, female Hockey Canada registrations increased by 59%. The Canadian Women's Hockey League (CWHL) largely replaced the NWHL and ran for 12 seasons, from 2007 to 2019, with teams competing for the Clarkson Cup. The CWHL, which operated on a non-profit basis, did not pay player salaries, but it did at times offer stipends and bonuses, and it aspired to become a professional league. However, the league lacked financial stability, and folded in 2019. A new National Women's Hockey League, which did offer player salaries, was established in the United States in 2015, and it expanded into Canada in 2020 with the addition of the Toronto Six. However, after the collapse of the CWHL, hundreds of prominent women's players, including Canadian and American Olympians, founded the Professional Women's Hockey Players' Association (PWHPA) and opted to boycott existing leagues in pursuit of a unified, financially stable professional league.

In 2023, the NWHL—rebranded as the Premier Hockey Federation in 2021—was purchased and ultimately dissolved as part of the foundation of the Professional Women's Hockey League (PWHL), the unified league many players had been working towards. The league debuted in January 2024. Three of its six charter franchises are located in Canada in Toronto, Ottawa, and Montreal. Toronto hosted the inaugural PWHL game on January 1, 2024. The next day, a sold-out game at Ottawa's TD Place Arena between Ottawa and Montreal set a new attendance record for professional women's hockey with 8,318 fans.

== National identity ==
Ice hockey is considered a major component of Canadian culture and national identity.

=== Canada's national game debate ===
In May 1964, former Canadian Amateur Hockey Association president and then current member of parliament Jack Roxburgh did extensive research to find if Canadian parliament had ever declared a national game, and specifically looked into whether lacrosse was officially declared. After going through parliamentary records, he found no law was ever enacted. The Canadian Press reported at the time that the myth of lacrosse as Canada's national game possibly came from a book published in 1869 titled Lacrosse, the National Game of Canada, and that the Canadian Lacrosse Association was founded in 1867. His endeavour to declare hockey as Canada's national game coincided with the Great Canadian Flag Debate. On October 28, 1964, Roxburgh moved to introduce Bill C–132, with respect to declaring hockey as the national game of Canada.

Canadian Lacrosse Association members responded to the motion by calling it insulting and "out of line", and vowed to fight it. On June 11, 1965, Bob Prittie replied by introducing a separate bill to have lacrosse declared as Canada's national game and stated that, "I think it is fitting at this time when we are considering national flags, national anthems and other national symbols, that this particular matter should be settled now". The choice of Canada's national game was debated in 1965, but neither bill was passed when parliament was dissolved. In 1967, Prime Minister Lester B. Pearson proposed to name national summer and winter games, but nothing was resolved. Finally in April 1994, Bill C–212 was passed to recognize hockey as Canada's official winter game, and lacrosse as its summer game.

== See also ==
- History of Canadian sports
- History of the National Hockey League
- List of ice hockey leagues#North America
- Black players in ice hockey
- LGBTQ people in ice hockey

== Bibliography ==
- Bray, Matt; Epp, Ernie, eds. (1984). A Vast and Magnificent Land: An Illustrated History of Northern Ontario. Thunder Bay and Sudbury, Ontario: Lakehead University & Laurentian University. ISBN 0-88667-002-0.
- Duplacey, James (2003). Hockey's Book of Firsts. North Dighton, Massachusetts: World Publications Group. ISBN 1-57215-378-4.
- MacSkimming, Andrew (1996). Cold War: The Amazing Canada–Soviet Hockey Series of 1972. Vancouver: Greystone Books. ISBN 1-55054-473-X.
- Podnieks, Andrew (2009). Canada's Olympic hockey history 1920–2010. Toronto: Fenn Publishing. ISBN 978-1-55168-323-2.
- Podnieks, Andrew; Brezina, Alex; Gibbons, Dennis; Ryzkov, Dmitri; Rabiner, Igor; Bengtsson, Jan; Stark, Jan; Vukolov, Nikolai; Barta, Pavel; Chuev, Serge; Ratschunas, Tom; Dimitrov, Vlad; Bogatyrev, Yevgeny; Lukashin, Yuri; Tsybarev, Yuri (2002). Kings of the Ice: A History of World Hockey. Richmond Hill, Ontario: NDE Publishing. ISBN 1-55321-099-9.
- Romain, Joseph; Duplacey, James (1989). The Stanley Cup. New York: Gallery Books. ISBN 0-8317-8032-0.
- Willes, Ed (2004). The Rebel League: The Short and Unruly Life of the World Hockey Association. Toronto: McClelland & Stewart. ISBN 0-7710-8947-3.
