= Blaine Sexton =

British ice hockey player

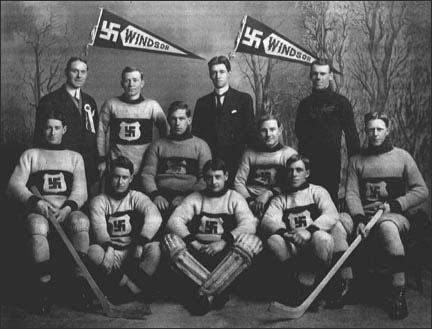
- Blaine Sexton seated on the far right in a team photo for the Windsor Swastikas
- Born: 3 May 1891 Falmouth, Nova Scotia, Canada
- Died: 29 April 1966 (aged 74) Folkestone, England, United Kingdom
- Position: Forward
- Shot: Right
- Played for: Windsor Swastikas; London Lions
- National team: Great Britain
- Playing career: 1905–1933

Blaine Sexton
Medal record

Representing Great Britain

1924 Winter Olympics

Men's Ice hockey
Bronze medal – third place	1924 Chamonix	Team competition

Blaine Nathaniel Sexton (3 May 1891 – 29 April 1966) was a British ice hockey player who competed in the 1924 Winter Olympics and in the 1928 Winter Olympics. In 1916 he joined the Canadian Expeditionary Force and fought in the trenches of France on the Western Front during World War I. After the war he was instrumental in not only expanding Ice Hockey in the United Kingdom but across Europe. Known in Europe as B.N.Sexton he was inducted into the UK Hockey Hall of fame in 1950.

== Early life ==
Sexton was born Blaine Nathaniel Sexton to Mr. and Mrs. John Sexton in Falmouth, Nova Scotia. He was a student at the King's College School where the game of hockey was started. He then started to play for the Windsor Swastikas.

== World War I ==
With the outbreak of war Sexton joined the Canadian Expeditionary Force and was posted to the UK as an infantry officer during World War One. While fighting on the western front in France he was wounded twice before being transferred to the cavalry where he became the army sabre champion.

== Spreading hockey ==
After the war he moved back to Nova Scotia Canada with a woman he met and married in while stationed in England. He spent a few years before returning to the UK because his wife was homesick. In the UK as well as mainland Europe he was instrumental in advancing the sport of Hockey. Known as England's "MISTER HOCKEY" newspaper reports of the time show that Sexton was lead hockey player in Europe. In 1924 he was a member of the British ice hockey team, which won the bronze medal. The same year, he founded the London Lions team. Four years later he finished fourth with the British team in the 1928 Olympic tournament.

In 1924 he founded the London Lions a hockey team mainly composed of expatriate Canadians. The Lions made it to the finals of the 1924/25 Coupe de Davos and made it through to the quarterfinals of the prestigious club tournament – the Spengler Cup. In May 1930 during the first playoffs for the British League title Sexton pushed the Lions to defeat the Glasgow 2–1 to win the Patton Cup, a title they held for one more year. At almost 40 Sexton was selected for the British team during the first World Championships staged in 1930, Great Britain came last.

== Retirement and later life ==
When Sexton turned 40 at the end of the 1932–33 season he retired to concentrate on his canning plants. He was one of the last players to use the 'D' or automobile bladed skates. His retirement saw the end of the London Lions when the team moved to Wembley Arena as renamed the Wembley Lions. The team was reformed in the 1970s by Detroit Red Wings owner Bruce Norris. Sexton's business in the London fruit brokers and commission merchants went on to become a successful enterprise.

Sexton was inducted to the British Ice Hockey Hall of Fame in 1950 and died in Folkestone, England, in 1966. In 1993 he became a member of the Birthplace of Hockey Hall of Fame in Windsor, Nova Scotia. Sexton's photos and Olympic crest as well as his nine-layered laminated childhood puck, complete with hand-carved initials, are on display at the Windsor, Nova Scotia Hockey Heritage Centre.
