= Stannus Street Rink =

Former ice hockey arena in Windsor, Nova Scotia

Coordinates: 44°59′31.1″N 64°08′02.4″W

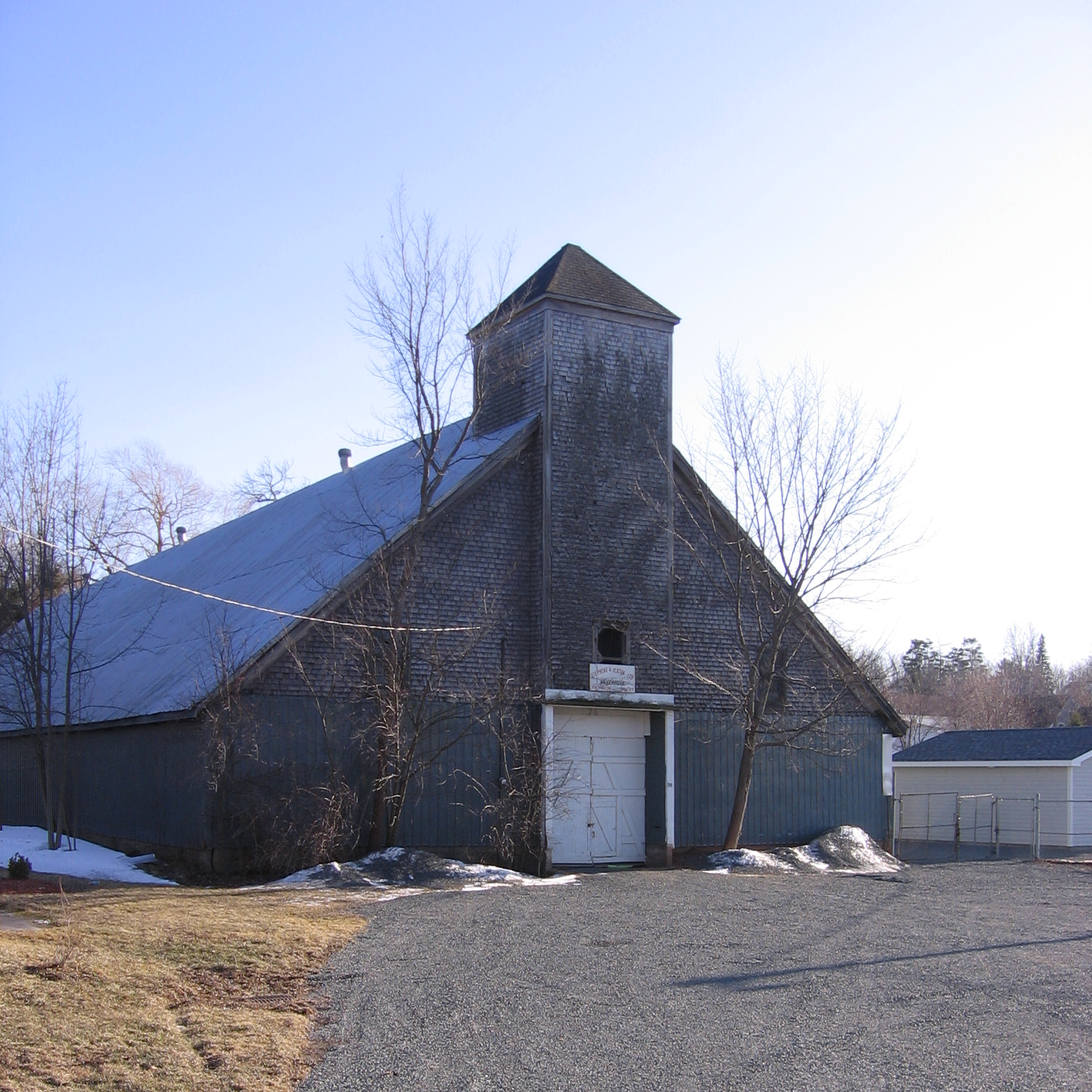
Stannus Street Rink, Windsor, Nova Scotia

The Stannus Street Rink, also known as the Windsor Rink, located at 321 Stannus Street at Thomas Street in Windsor, Nova Scotia, is a former ice hockey arena, considered the oldest in Canada, having been built in 1897.

== History ==
The building was built in 1897; 128 years ago to store lumber after the town of Windsor was destroyed by fire. Every winter, a natural ice rink was made inside. The arena was home to the Windsor Maple Leafs, an amateur senior men's hockey team in the Nova Scotia Senior Hockey League, from 1959 to 1964 and the Windsor Swastikas from 1905 to 1916.

The facility stopped playing host to hockey in the 1960s with the construction of Hants Exhibition Arena. An outdoor rink is used next door at Hants Aquatics Centre during the winter. The building is currently used as a winter storage facility from a local car dealership, but the town is considering purchasing the building as it is currently (2016) on sale by the current owner.

== See also ==
- Long Pond - local pond in Windsor used for hockey since the 19th Century
- Hockey Heritage Centre
