= Windsor Swastikas =

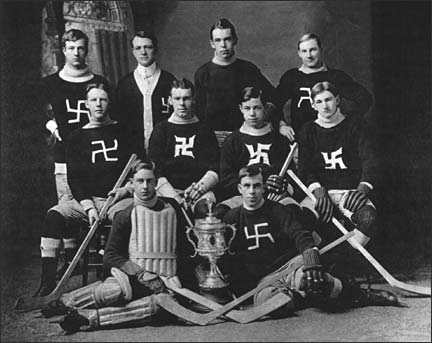
- City: Windsor, Nova Scotia
- League: Western Nova Scotia Amateur Hockey League championship Halifax Herald and Mail Trophy
- Operated: 1905–1916

Franchise history
- 1905–1916: Windsor Swastikas

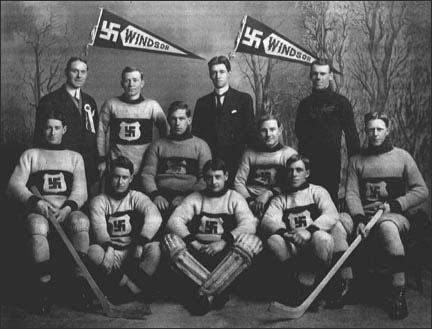
Windsor Swastikas wearing their light uniforms circa 1912

The Windsor Swastikas were a Canadian ice hockey team in Windsor, Nova Scotia, from 1905–1916. Not to be confused with the Fernie Swastikas across the country in British Columbia, the “Swastikas” was chosen by them as the swastika is also a symbol of luck and success, and at the time did not have the stigma associated with the then-nonexistent Nazi Party.

== Team logo ==
The Windsor Swastikas used the ancient swastika symbol as their logo. The swastika is an equilateral cross with its arms bent at right angles, in either right-facing (卐) form or its mirrored left-facing (卍) form. Archaeological evidence of swastika-shaped ornaments dates from the Neolithic period and the design is still widely used in many religions around the world. Though once commonly used all over much of the world without stigma, because of its iconic usage in Nazi Germany the symbol has become stigmatized in the Western world, even outlawed in Germany.

== History ==
Credited as the birthplace of hockey, Windsor has a long history of the sport. As such it was natural that the small town would have a touring team. When selecting logos for their hockey team they chose a symbol that at the time was associated with power and good fortune, much like the four leafed clover. The team formed in 1905 and toured the East coast of Canada travelling as far as St. John's, Newfoundland to play other professional teams. At first they played in and won the Western Nova Scotia Amateur Hockey League championship. They also defeated other teams to win the famous Halifax Herald and Mail Trophy. The team moved by train from town to town as was common in the era. For home games they played at the Stannus Street Rink, the oldest rink in Canada. The team disbanded during World War I when many players, like Blaine Sexton, joined the Canadian Expeditionary Force that fought on the Western Front.

== Notable players ==
- Blaine Sexton (May 3, 1892 – April 27, 1966) – Was a former Swastika player who went on to become a player on the British ice hockey team that got a bronze medal at the 1924 Winter Olympics.
- Walter Regan – Coach of Swastikas. His son, Gerald Regan, later became Premier of Nova Scotia.
- Lew Shaw – Inductee of the Nova Scotia Sport Hall of Fame for hockey.
- Charles "Charlie" Patterson – an accomplished rowing and speed skating champion from Dartmouth and inductee of the Nova Scotia Sports Hall of Fame along with his brother Sandy.

== See also ==
- History of hockey
- Fernie Swastikas
- Western use of the swastika in the early 20th century
