= Fernie Swastikas =

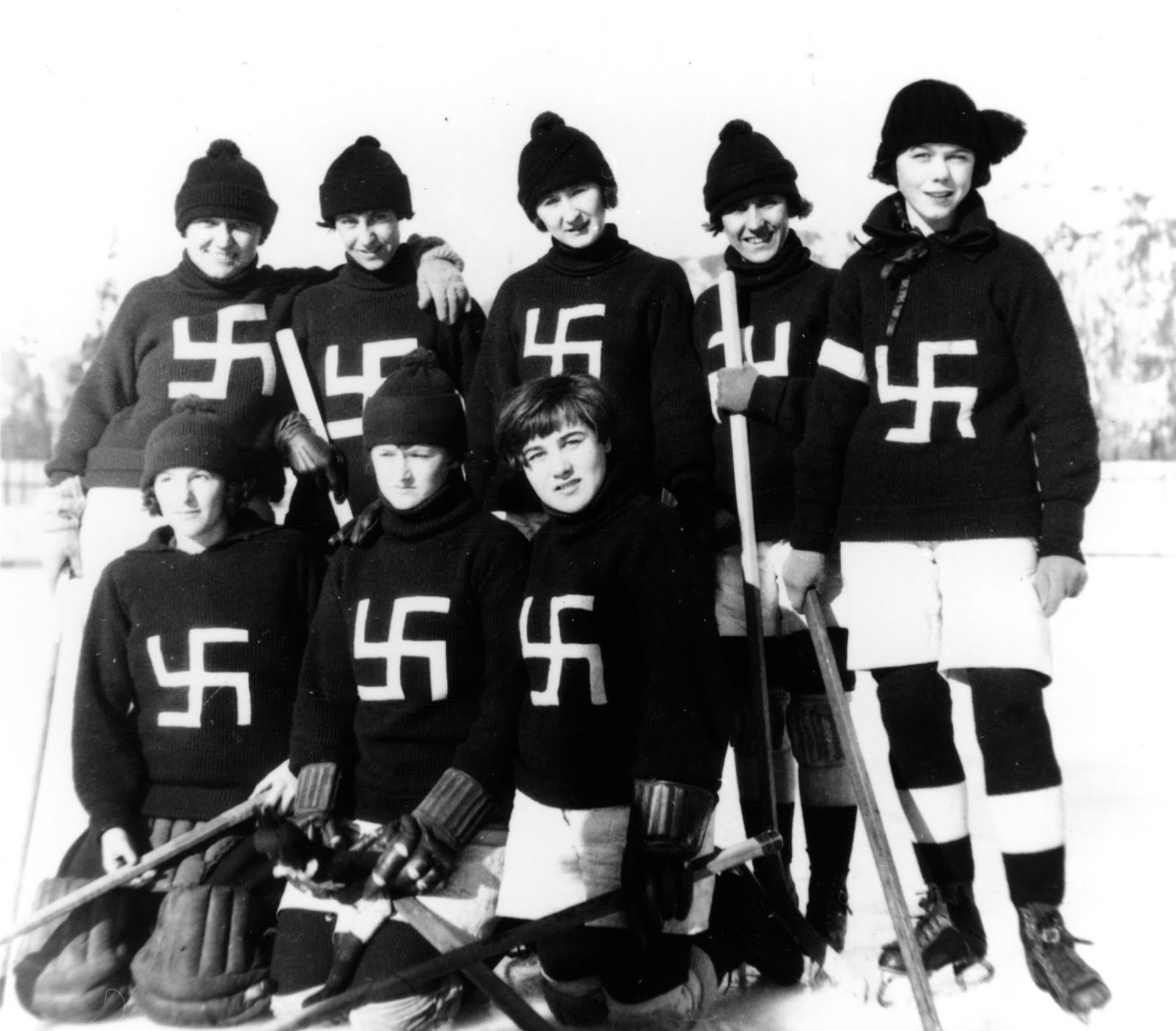
- City: Fernie, British Columbia
- Founded: 1922; 104 years ago
- Folded: 1926; 100 years ago

Championships
- Alpine Cups: 1923

The Fernie Swastikas were a women's hockey team that was formed in 1922 in Fernie, British Columbia. Their uniform used as a symbol the swastika, which before World War II was a common religious symbol, and especially a sun sign. In 1923, the Swastikas won the Alpine Cup at the Banff Winter Carnival women's ice hockey championship. There were two other teams called the Swastikas, one in Edmonton, Alberta, and another the Windsor Swastikas of Windsor, Nova Scotia.

== History ==
The first recorded women's ice hockey game in Fernie took place in January 1918. The game was played between teams composed of school teachers and bank clerks. Another game was held on January 1, 1919. The teams were organized by Mary Dragon and Edith Biggs. Several days later, the best players from both teams became the Fernie Ladies Hockey Team.

Due to the limited number of opponents in the Kootenay region, the Fernie team played only one game in 1920. It was played in January against the Calgary Regents, at the Victoria Park arena. Fernie was defeated by a 1–0 score. Despite the loss, the Fernie team was invited to participate in the first ever Calgary Winter Carnival in 1921. At the Carnival, Fernie played the Regents once more. The Regents triumphed by a 3–0 score and a rivalry was born between the two. In February 1921, the Regents visited Fernie and won by a 1–0 score.

In January 1922, the Fernie Ladies Hockey Team was named the Fernie Swastikas. The uniform was composed of white knickers and red sweaters. The Swastikas would appear at the 1922 Calgary Winter Carnival and play the Calgary Regents. The Swastikas won by a 4–0 score.

=== 1923 championship ===
In the 1920s and 1930s, there was a women's hockey tournament called the Alpine Cup at the Banff Winter Carnival. In 1923, the Fernie Swastikas defeated the Calgary Regents and the Vancouver Amazons to become champions.

The city of Fernie welcomed back the team on March 7, 1923, as the club returned from Banff by train. When the Fernie team returned home, schools were let out early so that the children could cheer their champion team. Also, they were escorted to the Fernie City Hall celebration party by a RCMP honor guard and Fernie pipe band. Of note, Dahlia Schagel was captain of the team, and team member Dorothy Henderson was the daughter of the mayor of Fernie.

== Banff Winter Carnival history ==
On January 24, 1923, the Swastikas beat the Regents by a 3–0 score. After the victory, the Swastikas were invited to play for the Alpine Cup at the Banff Winter Carnival. At the Carnival, the Swastikas beat the Vancouver Amazons by a 2–0 score, and were named Alpine Cup champions as they had defeated the defending champions. During the Carnival the Swastikas also played two scoreless games against the Calgary Regents, who attempted to win the Cup from them.

The Swastikas returned to the Banff Carnival in 1924 to defend their title. In the quarterfinals, the Swastikas defeated the Calgary Patricias by a 4–1 tally. Their opposition in the semifinals was a newly formed team called the Canmore Minnewankas. Team founder Edith Biggs cracked her rib in the first period of the game against Canmore. Canmore was ahead 1–0 by the third period and upset the Swastikas. Despite the loss, Fernie team captain Dahlia Schagel was elected as Carnival Queen for the upcoming year.

== Disbanding ==
After the loss to Canmore, the composition of the Swastikas team changed. Dorothy Henderson had died on May 24. Elaine Ross moved to Edmonton, where she later played for the Edmonton Monarchs, while team founder Mary Dragon moved to the United States.

With the formation of the Alberta Amateur Hockey Federation, the Swastikas could only play teams from Alberta at the Banff Winter Carnival. This limited the level of competition for them; their only opposition in British Columbia was the newly formed Cranbrook Canucks. The Swastikas did not play a game in 1925, although Dahlia Schagel fulfilled her obligations as Carnival Queen at the 1925 Banff Winter Carnival.

Their last appearance at the Banff Winter Carnival was in 1926, when they were defeated by the Edmonton Monarchs for the Alpine Cup.

== See also ==
- Canadian women's ice hockey history
- Windsor Swastikas
- Western use of the Swastika in the early 20th century

== Bibliography ==
Notes

References

- Hall, Margaret Ann (2002). The girl and the game: a history of women's sport in Canada (2002 ed.). University of Toronto Press. ISBN 1-55111-268-X. - Total pages: 284
- Norton, Wayne (2009). Women on Ice: The Early Years of Women's Hockey in Western Canada (2009 ed.). Ronsdale Press. ISBN 978-1-55380-073-6.
