= Calgary Regents =

Canadian women's ice hockey team

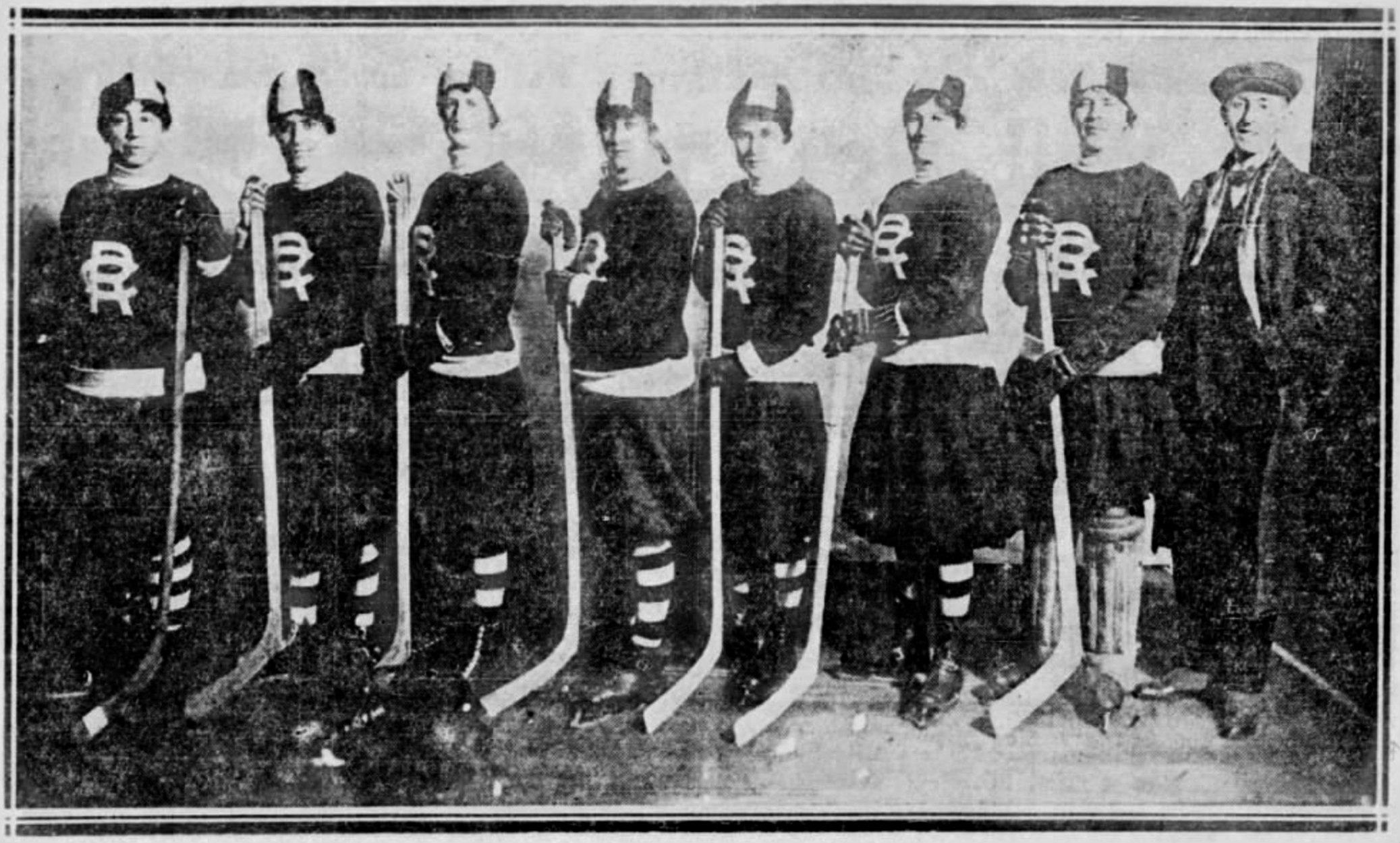
Calgary Regents in 1916–17. Left to right: E. M. Ballard, E. O. Robinson, M. M. Simpson, Winnie Shipps, Pensy Pue, A. L. Brownlee, Jessie MacDonald, C. L. Brown (coach)

The Calgary Regents were a women's ice hockey team from Calgary, Alberta, during the 1910s and 1920s.

The Calgary Regents won the Alpine Cup at the Banff Winter Carnival four times between 1917 and 1921, the last time after having defeated the Vancouver Amazons 4 goals to 1 on February 4, 1921, after a hat-trick by righter winger Mabel Short.

== See also ==
- Canadian women's ice hockey history
