= Edmonton Monarchs =

Women's ice hockey team

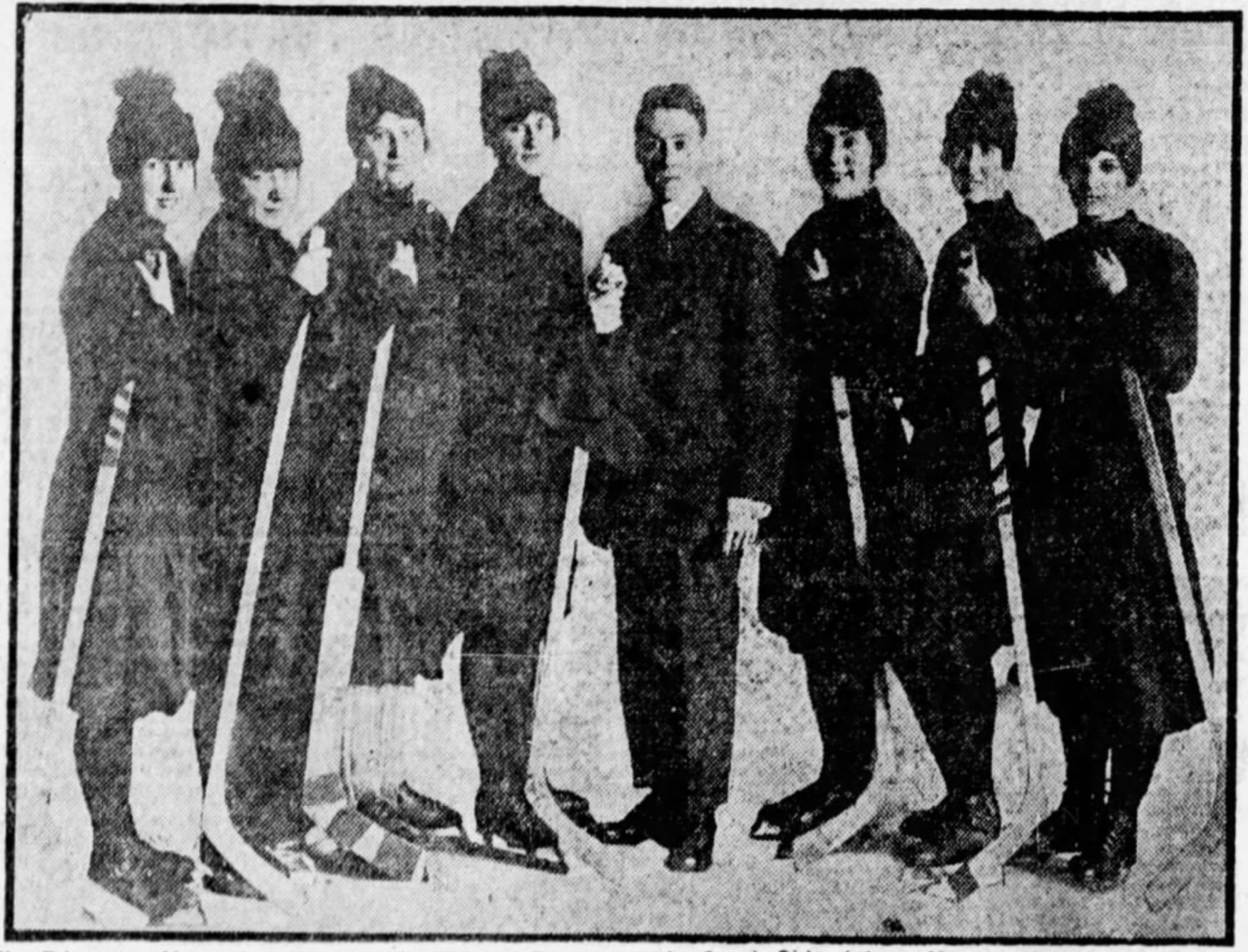
Edmonton Monarchs in 1918. Left to right: Jess Tidsbury (left wing), Cora Vance (left defence), Isabel Coffey (goaltender), Marion Peacock (rover), Potts Newman (coach), T. Guilfoyle (right defence), M. Blades (centre), V. Moore (right wing).

The Edmonton Monarchs were a women's ice hockey team that started as the Edmonton Victorias in 1914. The club represented Victoria High School in Edmonton.

== Victorias ==
The Victorias played from 1914 to 1917. In 1917, the Victorias competed against the Calgary Crescents and the Calgary Regents. It was the first women's hockey rivalry between the cities of Edmonton and Calgary.

== Monarchs ==
In 1918, the Victorias were renamed the Monarchs. In their first game, they played the University of Alberta women's ice hockey club. The team participated at the Banff Hockey Carnival women's hockey tournament in 1918. The team was the only women's hockey team at the tournament to be coached by a woman. In the semifinals, the Monarchs defeated a team from Vulcan, Alberta. In the finals, the Monarchs triumphed over the Calgary Crescents.

After 1918, the Monarchs were coached by a man. The Monarchs did not win at the Banff Winter Carnival tournament again until 1926. In the final, the Monarchs defeated the Fernie Swastikas. It was the last ever game for the Swastikas.

== Later years ==
In 1929, the majority of the players were former players with the University of Alberta women's hockey team. The result was four consecutive Alpine Cup championships from 1929 to 1932. After winning the Misener Cup in 1929, the Monarchs issued an open challenge to a men's team from the Edmonton Rotary Club.

The city of Edmonton organized women's hockey into three divisions in 1930: junior, intermediate and senior. The Monarchs and the University of Alberta were the only teams that comprised the senior division.

In 1933, the Monarchs suffered their first loss in four years at the hands of the newly formed Edmonton Rustlers team. The members of the Rustlers were aged 15 to 18 years. During the entire year, the Rustlers were undefeated in regular season and post season play versus the Monarchs.
