= Vancouver Amazons =

- City: Vancouver, British Columbia
- League: International Ladies' Hockey League (1921)
- Operated: 1918–c. 1927, 1931
- Home arena: Denman Arena
- Colors: maroon (1918–) white, red, black (1921–)
- Owner: Frank Patrick
- Head coach: Guy Patrick

The Vancouver Amazons were a Canadian women's ice hockey team of the late 1910s and 1920s based in Vancouver, British Columbia at Denman Arena.

== History ==
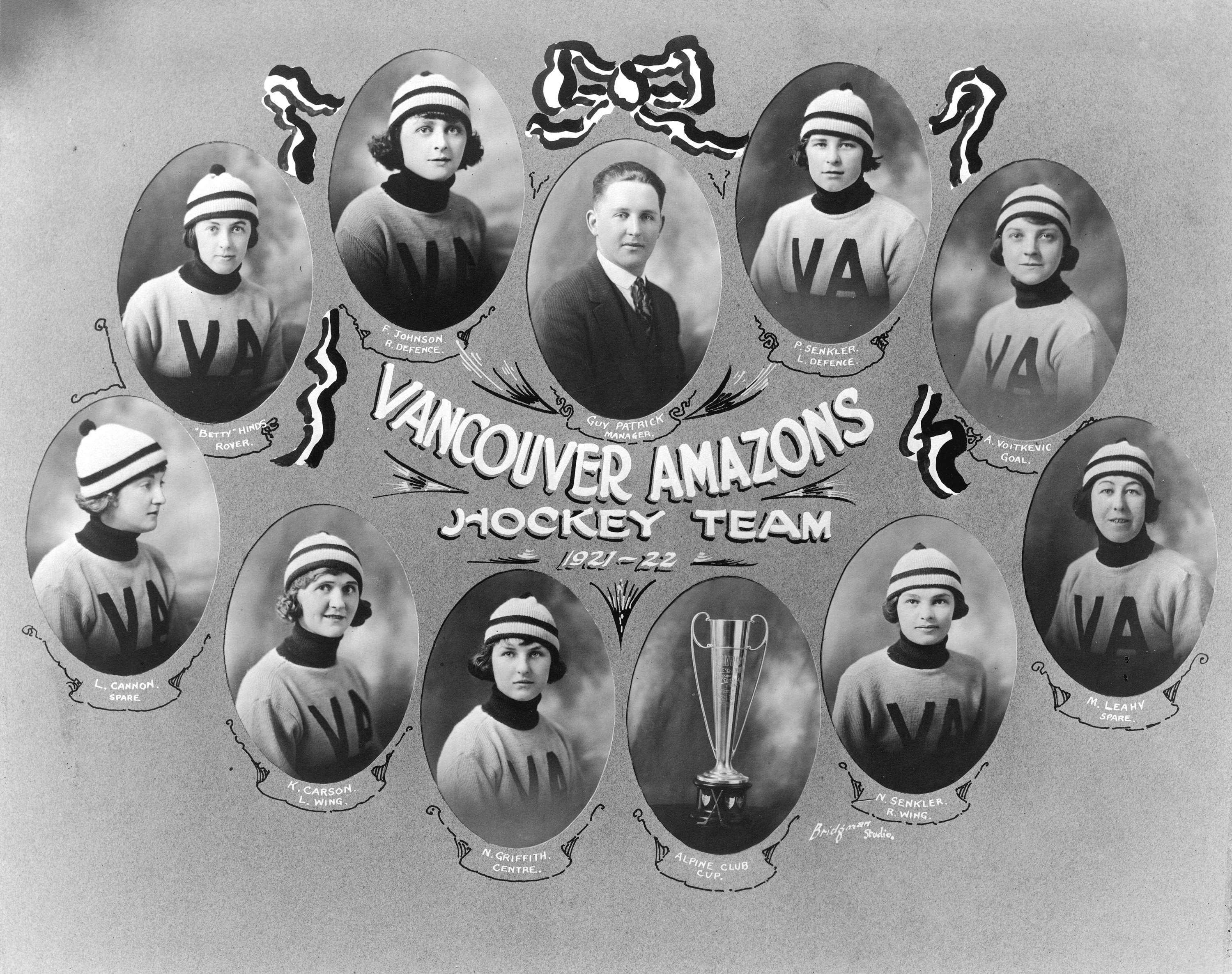
Vancouver Amazons with the Alpine Club Cup in the 1921–22 season.

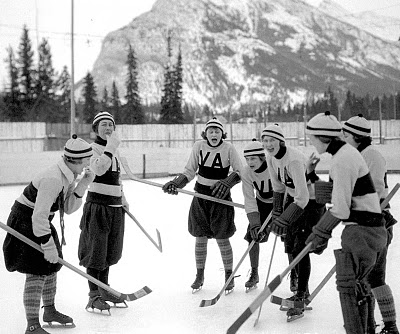
Vancouver Amazons in Banff, Alberta

The Amazons were founded in 1918, originally as a student club of women attending Vancouver's King George High School. That year, the team challenged and upset the more established Vancouver Ladies Hockey Team, eventually securing themselves as the dominant force in local women's hockey.

The Amazons frequently played during intermissions of the men's Vancouver Millionaires games, whose owner Frank Patrick came to sponsor the women's team as an affiliate.

In 1919, the Amazons played one-off games against the Calgary Regents, champions of the Alberta women's circuit, and in 1920 held an exhibition games against the University of Washington and the Seattle Vamps.

The Amazons were the first women's hockey team from Vancouver to participate in the invitational women's hockey tournament sponsored by the Banff Winter Carnival known as the Alpine Cup, first participating in 1921. The Amazons qualified for the final that year but were defeated by the Regents.

Patrick would go on organize a tournament featuring the Amazons, the Seattle Vamps and the Victoria Kewpies, known as the International Ladies' Hockey League. As the tournament featured a team from the United States, many consider this the first ever international women's hockey competition. The Amazons went undefeated in the tournament and did not allow a goal, and were thus crowned West Coast Women's champions.

At the Banff tournament in 1922, Elizabeth Hinds became the first woman from British Columbia to score a hat trick in a game. Phebe Senkler was captain of the Amazons and her sister Norah played on defense. The forwards were Kathleen Carson and Nan Griffith, while the goaltender was Amelia Voitkevic. The bench featured Lorraine Cannon and Mayme Leahy. The Amazons qualified for the 1922 final and played the Calgary Regents. In the third period, the Amazons were down 1–0, and Kathleen Carson tied the game. Carson would score the game-winning goal in overtime and were awarded the Alpine Club Cup.

The team returned to Banff to participate the Alpine Cup each consecutive year until 1927.

== Second team ==
The new version of the Vancouver Amazons was founded in 1931. The club was organized by competitive speed skater Doris Parkes. Former Fernie Swastikas player Belva Graves was now a member of the team.

== Honors ==
Alpine Cup

- Champions: 1922
- Runners-up: 1921

International Ladies' Hockey League

- Champions: 1921

The Vancouver Amazons of 1921–22 were inducted to the BC Sports Hall of Fame in 2024.

== Players ==
=== 1921 Roster ===
- Amelia Voitkevic (goal)
- Nora Senkler
- Greta Maddison
- Betty Hinds
- Thelma Insley
- Kathleen Carson
- Nan Griffith
- Phebe Senkler (captain)
- Lorraine Canon
- Isabel McLeod
