= Hockey: Canada's Royal Winter Game =

1899 book by Arthur Farrell

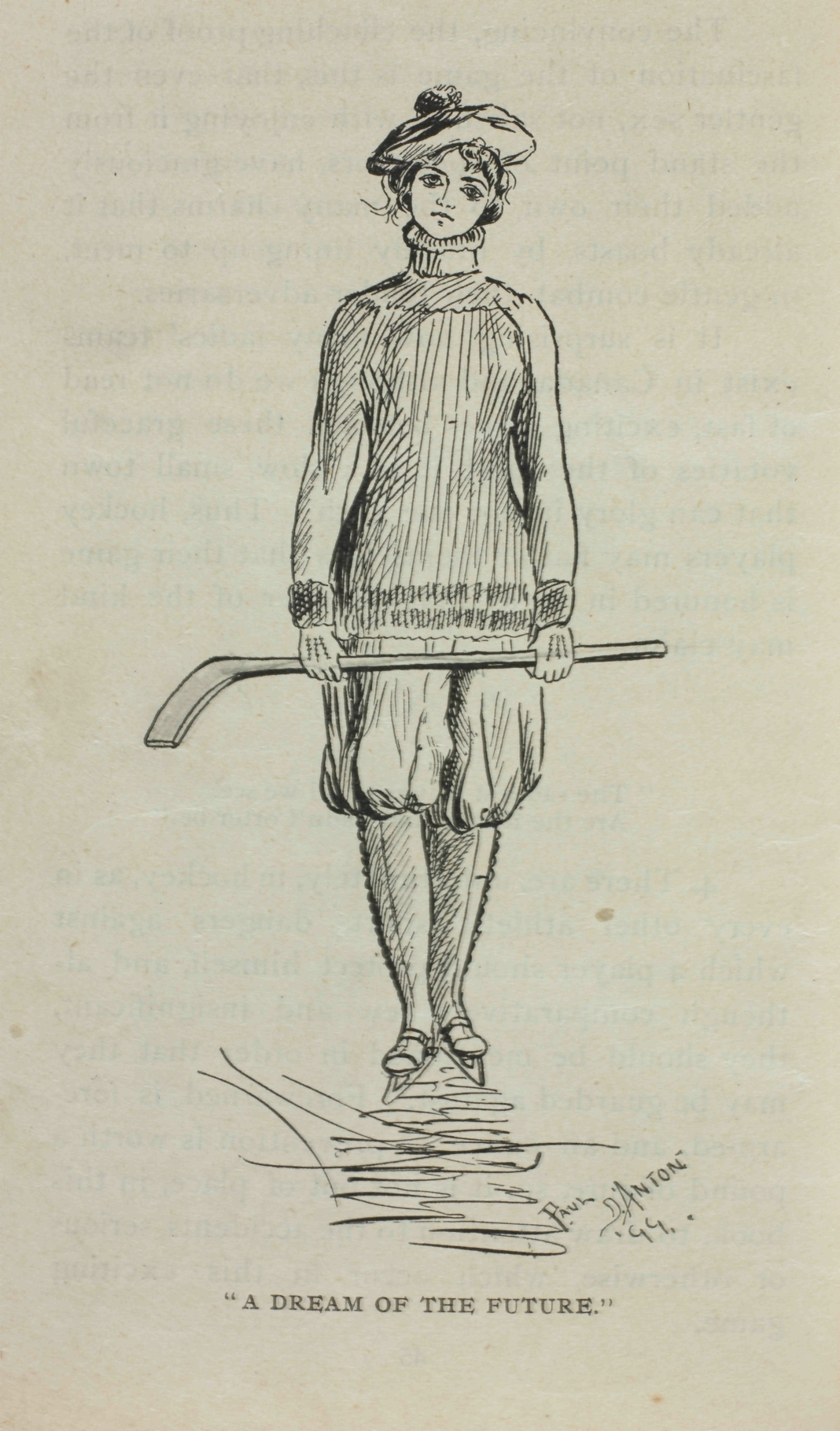
"A Dream of the Future", a drawing of a female ice hockey player appearing in the book

Hockey: Canada's Royal Winter Game is the first book about ice hockey. It was written by Arthur Farrell in 1899.

Farrell, a professional player, won the Stanley Cup with the Montreal Shamrocks of the Canadian Amateur Hockey League (CAHL) in 1899 and 1900. He wrote the book in the middle of his career in response to demand. He stated in the introduction his work was borne out of "the necessity of a book on hockey". The book, 122 pages long, is less of an overall discussion of the sport but more of hand-book, with approximately a third of the book devoted to the "Science of Hockey". The chapter describes general strategy of the game, and features in-depth commentary on the position by the star players of the day. The book gives a brief history of the sport, describes the benefits of playing it, and gives advice to players in a context independent to strategy and practices pertaining to the team as a whole. The last chapter gives three sets of rules for ice hockey; it uses CAHL rules for Quebec, Ontario Hockey Association (OHA) rules for Ontario, and Amateur Hockey League of New York rules for the US. Within the chapters of the book are placed photographs and short articles on the leading teams of the era.

Only four copies are known to exist. One copy was digitised and restored by Library and Archives Canada (LAC). This copy was originally in the possession of Dr. J.M.F. Malone, team doctor for the Trois-Rivières Reds, before it was passed down to his son, Brian Malone, who then gave the book to Red Fisher, a noted hockey columnist, on the condition that the book be available for research by hockey historians. Fisher loaned the book to Canadian Prime Minister Stephen Harper, who has an interest in the history of ice hockey. Harper gave the book to the LAC for restoration work in 2006. Following the LAC's work, the book was donated to Concordia University, and it is now kept in their archives.

== Bibliography ==
- Farrell, Arthur (1899). Hockey: Canada's Royal Winter Game. Montreal: C.R. Corneil.
- Lennox, Doug (2008). Now You Know Hockey. Toronto: Dundurn Press. ISBN 9781550028690.
