= Alpine Cup =

The Banff Winter Carnival women's ice hockey tournament was an ice hockey tournament played in Banff, Alberta, Canada from 1917 to 1935. In the early years, it was contested to determine the women's ice hockey provincial champions of Alberta. In later years, the winners were awarded the Alpine Cup.

== History ==
At the 1918 tournament, the Edmonton Monarchs held the distinction of being the only women's ice hockey team at the tournament to be coached by a woman. The Fernie Swastikas played their last ever game in the 1926 Tournament.

== List of winners ==
- The following is a list of all the champions from the Banff Winter Carnival. The Banff Winter Carnival organizers were known to pay each team up to twenty-five percent of gate receipts to help cover team expenses. In later years, the Carnival would guarantee travel expenses for the competing teams.

| Year | Winner |
| 1917 | Calgary Regents |
| 1918 | Edmonton Monarchs |
| 1919 | Calgary Regents |
| 1920 | Calgary Regents |
| 1921 | Calgary Regents |
| 1922 | Vancouver Amazons |
| 1923 | Fernie Swastikas |
| 1924 | Calgary Hollies |
| 1925 | Calgary Hollies |
| 1926 | Edmonton Monarchs |
| 1927 | Calgary Hollies |
| 1928 | Calgary Hollies |
| 1929 | Edmonton Monarchs |
| 1930 | Edmonton Monarchs |
| 1931 | Edmonton Monarchs |
| 1932 | Edmonton Monarchs |
| 1933 | Edmonton Rustlers |
| 1934 | Red Deer Amazons |
| 1935 | Red Deer Amazons |
