= Albertine Lapensée =

Canadian ice hockey player (1898-1963)

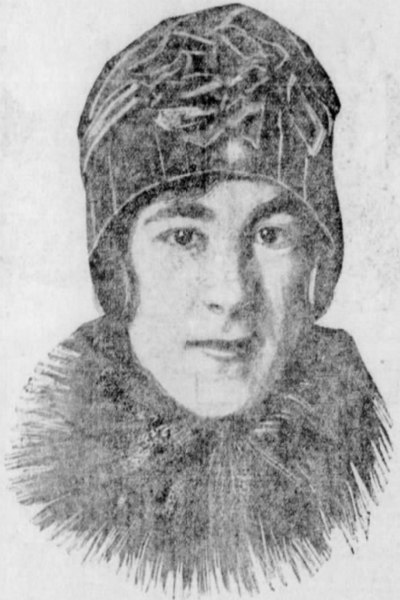
- Lapensée in 1917
- Born: August 10, 1898 Cornwall, Ontario, Canada
- Died: January 7, 1963 (aged 64) Cornwall, Ontario, Canada
- Position: Forward
- Shot: Right
- Played for: Cornwall Victorias; Cornwall Nationals; Cornwall All-Stars; Hull Vestas; Cornwall Ladies Hockey Club
- Playing career: January 27, 1916–March 26, 1917

Albertine Lapensée (August 10, 1898 – January 7, 1963) was a Canadian ice hockey player, often thought to be Canada's first women's hockey "superstar". She played for the Cornwall Victorias, Cornwall Nationals, Cornwall All-Stars, and Hull Vestas in 1916 and Cornwall Ladies Hockey Club in 1917, when women's hockey enjoyed some prominence, as most of the healthy men were taking part in the First World War.

Lapensée was reputed to have scored over 150 goals and led her teams to be unbeaten throughout 1916 and 1917, when records indicate that they won 45 of their 46 games. (In his book "The Miracle Maid" the author records the historic goal count as 123 in only 28 games in which her teams recorded a 27–0–1 record) Research showed that Albertine received and did demand a share of the profits from the games. Lapensée disappeared from the sport in 1917, still a teenager. There were a number of rumours: that she had died in the 1918 flu pandemic, that she had travelled to New York to undergo a sex-change, or that she had always been a draft dodging man, though none provided any credible evidence. A 1940 profile of her father refuted all those claims, detailing her as living as a woman in New York.

== Early life and hockey career ==
Albertine Lapensée

Albertine Lapensée was born on August 10, 1898, in Cornwall, Ontario, the youngest of eleven children born to Phillippe and Matilde. She grew up playing ice hockey outdoors on frozen ponds and rivers alongside her brothers and other boys. With the outbreak of the First World War, the exodus of men to the fighting resulted in the decline of amateur hockey leagues. This meant that hockey arenas were losing revenue, and to counter this, the owners of the Jubilee Arena in Montreal organised a four-team women's hockey league in 1915, the Eastern Ladies' Hockey League. Lapensée joined the Cornwall Victorias for their second game after joining the ELHL in 1916. In her debut on January 27, 1916, she scored two goals in a 3-1 win over Ottawa, A week later she scored six as her team won 8–0. In another game, she scored 15 (16) goals, to help Cornwall to a 21–0 victory. Her exploits helped to promote ladies' hockey and women's sport; The Jubilee Arena was selling out its 3,000 seats for games, while the Cornwall Victorias were being asked to sign contracts with other teams to play in their arenas – as long as Lapensée was playing. In the press, she was nicknamed the "Miracle Maid" by the English-language press, and "l'etoile des etoiles" ("the star of stars") by the French-language press.

Such was her domination of the sport that there were persistent rumours that she was actually a man. These first surfaced immediately after her first match, when the members of the opposition Ottawa side accused her of being a man. The accusation was not unfounded in the league, where it was not uncommon for boys to be disguised as women to improve the spectacle. Some opposition teams went as far as removing Lapensée's tuque during games to check how long her hair was. Her father made a public statement that the claims were false, and in February 1916, the Montreal Star investigated the claims. The reporter spoke to "dozens and dozens of people from Cornwall who had known her since she was little", and concluded that "from what he learned he is thoroughly convinced 'he' is a 'she'." Despite this the rumours lingered, and some modern sources still speculate that she might have been a man. In 2011, an article in the Cornwall Standard Freeholder claimed that "we'll never know if Albertine was actually an Albert", suggesting the possibility that Lapensée was actually a draft dodger named Albert.

(This para needs to be edited) Newspaper records suggest that between 1916 and 1917, the Cornwall Victorias went unbeaten for 46 games; winning 45 and tying 1. During that period, they outscored their opponents 228–29, of which Lapensée scored 150, averaging more than three goals per game.(Actually the teams in Cornwall which Albertine played for went 27–0–1) Lapensée's ability and strength led to some odd occurrences in games she was involved in. In one, the Montreal Westerns played a 17-year-old, Ada Lalonde, who was being touted as "a hockey prodigy" and a talent to rival Lapensée. Lalonde turned out to be a young man that Montreal's owner had convinced to take part to try and outshine Lapensée. In another game, the Westerners goaltender, a Miss Hardman, was so scared of Lapensée's powerful shot that she wore a baseball catcher's mask. Lapensée realised how much money the league was making for the arenas, and how significant her role was in her team's success, and she demanded a share of the profits. These claims, leaked to the press, led the Montreal Star to dub her a prima donna. The team owners refused, and Lapensée retired from the league in 1918.

== Later life ==
The ELHL, faded into obscurity and folded after the war, Lapensée had already disappeared from the limelight. A variety of rumours circulated; there were some reports that she had died during the 1918 flu pandemic. Although a myth that she had undergone sex change surgery made it into a 1983 official history of Cornwall, the Library and Archives Canada's feature on women's hockey debunks it. The story follows that after her operation, she returned to the Cornwall area as a man, "Albert Smythe", ran a garage and got married. However, her mother's obituary in 1929 lists her as a living daughter, as does a 1940 profile of her father, which details she married a man named Albert Schmidt from New York. Further refuting the theory was that sex reassignment operations did not take place until after the Second World War. Further investigations have shown that Albertine was in fact a person with physical characteristics of both sexes and that she had chosen to immigrate to the United States and lived as Albert after the appearance of dominant male physical traits began to show after the puberty.

== Bibliography ==
- Hall, Margaret Ann (2016) [2002]. The Girl and the Game: A History of Women's Sport in Canada (Second ed.). University of Toronto Press. ISBN 978-1-4426-3413-8.
- McKinley, Michael (2006). Hockey: La fierté d'un peuple (in French). Canadian Broadcasting Corporation. ISBN 978-2-7621-2691-4.
