= 1998 3 Nations Cup rosters =

The 1998 3 Nations Cup rosters consisted of 64 players from three women's national ice hockey teams.

== Canada ==
On November 2, 1998, Hockey Canada named its final 21-woman roster for the tournament. Canada was led by three coaches at the tournament—head coach Danièle Sauvageau and assistant coaches Karen Hughes and Ken Dufton.

- Head coach: Danièle Sauvageau (CAN)

=== Skaters ===
Number	Position	Player	GP	G	A	Pts	PIM
20	F	Amanda Benoit	4	2	2	4	2
6	D	Thérèse Brisson	4	0	0	0	4
77	F	Cassie Campbell	4	4	0	4	0
21	D	Judy Diduck	3	0	0	0	0
18	F	Nancy Drolet	4	2	1	3	6
12	F	Lori Dupuis	4	0	2	2	4
15	F	Danielle Goyette	4	0	2	2	2
91	D	Geraldine Heaney	4	0	0	0	2
16	F	Jayna Hefford	4	2	0	2	2
4	D	Becky Kellar	4	0	0	0	4
10	F	Mai-Lan Le	4	2	1	3	0
19	F	Tracy Luhowy	4	0	0	0	4
98	F	Karen Nystrom	4	0	1	1	4
2	D	Cheryl Pounder	4	1	0	1	6
8	D	Nathalie Rivard	4	0	1	1	4
3	F	France Saint-Louis	4	1	0	1	4
9	D	Fiona Smith	4	0	2	2	0
61	F	Vicky Sunohara	4	2	1	3	8
11	F	Sommer West	2	0	0	0	0

=== Goaltenders ===
Number	Player	GP	W	L	Min	GA	GAA	SA	SV%	SO
33	Sami Jo Small	2	2	0	110:00	2	1.09	49	.959	0
35	Kim St-Pierre	3	2	0	140:00	6	2.57	45	.867	1

== Finland ==
Finland entered the tournament with a 23-woman roster.

=== Skaters ===
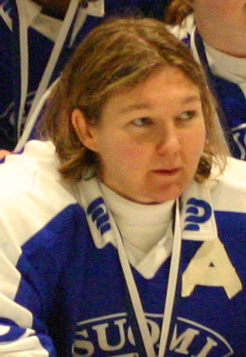
Forward Karoliina Rantamäki led Finland with two goals and five points in four games played.

Number	Position	Player	GP	G	A	Pts	PIM
10	F	Sari Fisk	4	0	3	3	0
8	D	Päivi Halonen	4	0	0	0	0
20	D	Kirsi Hänninen	4	2	1	2	2
5	D	Satu Huotari	4	0	0	0	2
11	F	Sanna Kanerva	4	0	0	0	2
23	F	Kirsi Koponen	2	0	0	0	0
24	F	Kati Kovalainen	4	0	0	0	0
3	D	Emma Laaksonen	4	0	0	0	0
22	F	Sanna Lankosaari	2	0	0	0	2
4	D	Katja Lehto	4	1	0	1	0
12	D	Anna Lindh	4	0	0	0	2
17	F	Rose Matilainen	4	1	0	1	2
7	D	Mari Östring	4	0	0	0	4
18	F	Tiina Paananen	4	0	1	1	0
25	F	Sanna Peura	4	0	1	1	0
29	F	Karoliina Rantamäki	4	2	3	5	0
16	F	Tiia Reima	4	0	0	0	2
28	F	Katja Riipi	4	0	0	0	4
26	F	Henna Savikuja	4	0	0	0	0
9	F	Hanne Sikiö	4	0	0	0	0
21	F	Petra Vaarakallio	4	2	3	5	0

=== Goaltenders ===
Number	Player	GP	W	L	Min	GA	GAA	SA	SV%	SO
19	Tuula Puputti	4	0	3	209:00	11	3.16	118	.907	0
30	Kati Ahonen	1	0	1	31:00	5	9.80	12	.583	0

== United States ==
The United States entered the tournament with a 20-woman roster.

- Head coach: Ben Smith (USA)

=== Skaters ===
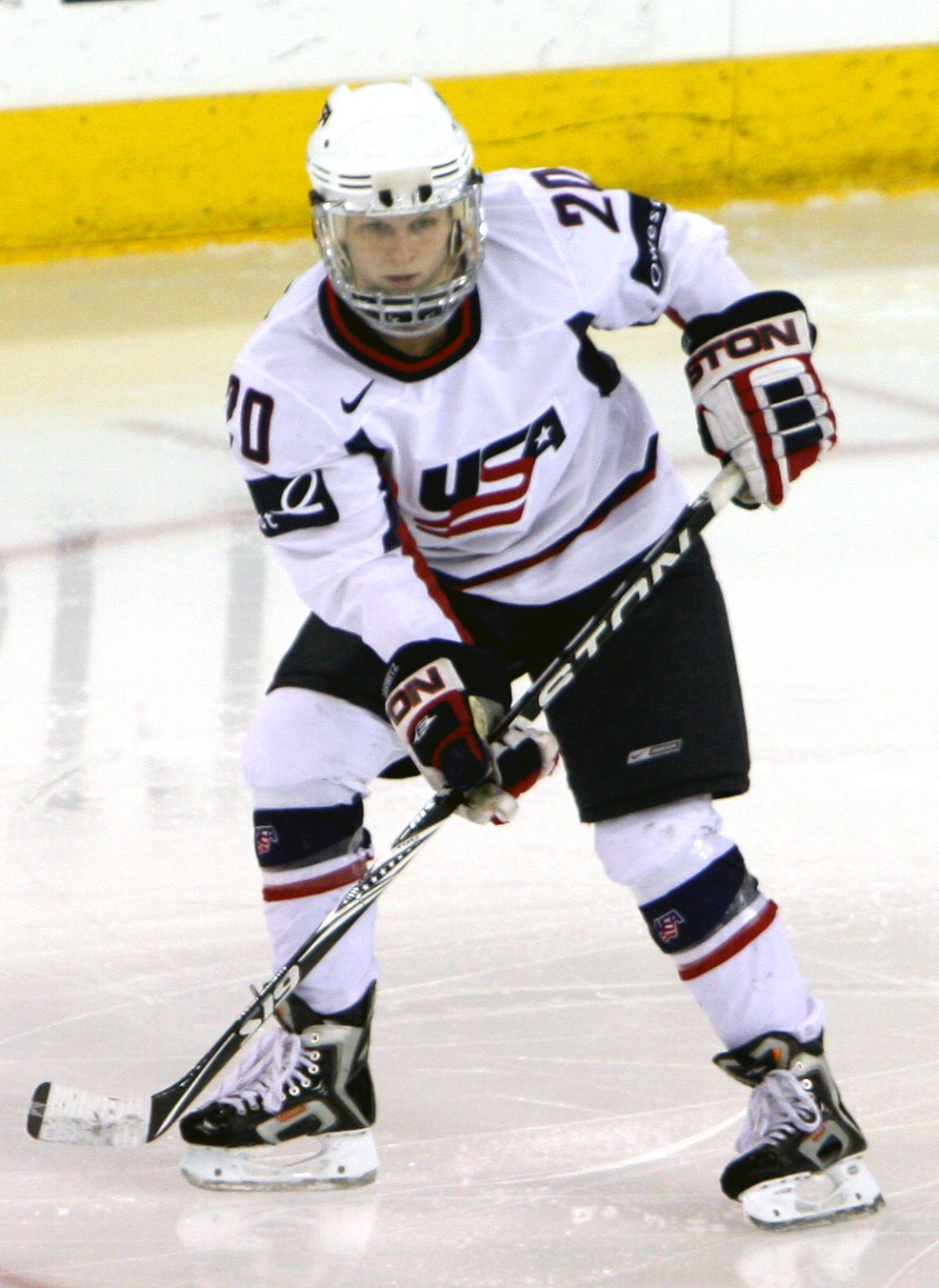
Forward Natalie Darwitz led the United States with six penalty minutes in four games played.

Number	Position	Player	GP	G	A	Pts	PIM
24	D	Chris Bailey	4	0	0	0	6
8	F	Laurie Baker	4	0	0	0	0
18	F	Alana Blahoski	4	0	1	1	0
5	D	Winny Brodt	4	0	0	0	0
6	F	Karyn Bye	4	3	2	5	4
3	D	Amy Coelho	4	1	0	1	0
22	F	Natalie Darwitz	4	0	0	0	6
25	F	Tricia Dunn	4	0	0	0	0
10	F	Brandy Fisher	4	1	1	2	2
21	F	Cammi Granato	4	0	2	2	4
23	D	Kelli Halcisak	4	0	0	0	2
14	D	Catherine Hanson	4	0	1	1	6
20	F	Katie King	4	1	0	1	0
15	F	Shelley Looney	4	1	0	1	6
7	D	Sue Merz	4	1	2	3	4
12	F	Jenny Schmidgall	4	1	1	2	0
16	F	Meaghan Sittler	4	0	0	0	0
17	F	Krissy Wendell	4	2	0	2	2

=== Goaltenders ===
Number	Player	GP	W	L	Min	GA	GAA	SA	SV%	SO
1	Sara DeCosta	3	1	2	190:00	7	2.21	90	.922	0
30	Lauren Goldstein	1	1	0	60:00	2	2.00	20	.900	0
