= France Saint-Louis =

Canadian ice hockey player (born 1979)

France St-Louis
- Born: October 17, 1958 (age 67) Laval, Quebec, Canada
- Height: 5 ft 9 in (175 cm)
- Weight: 174 lb (79 kg; 12 st 6 lb)
- Position: Centre
- Shot: Left
- Played for: Belvedère de Montréal / Carlton de Montréal → St-Hyacinthe (loan) → Sherbrooke (loan); Quatre Glaces Repentigny; Montreal Wingstar; DHC Lyss
- National team: Canada
- Playing career: 1979–2001

France Saint-Louis (born October 17, 1958) is a Canadian ice hockey coach and retired player. She was a member of the Canadian women's national ice hockey team for nearly a decade, winning gold medals at five IIHF Women's World Championships and a silver medal at the inaugural women's ice hockey tournament at the 1998 Winter Olympics. At the age of 40, she retired from the Canadian Olympic Program to launch her own hockey school. She served as a consultant to the Montreal Carabins women's ice hockey program from 2008 to 2016 and currently teaches at the Cégep du Vieux Montréal.

She won the Abby Hoffman Cup seven times at Hockey Canada's National Championships (1988, 1989, 1990, 1994, 1995, 1996, 1999) and was named the tournament's Most Valuable Player a record five times (1988, 1990, 1991, 1997, 1998)

== Playing career ==
=== Ice hockey ===
In the 1980s, writers often paralleled St-Louis with the best names in men's hockey, be it Guy Lafleur or Wayne Gretzky. She started the decade with Belvedère de Montréal, won her first national medal on loan with Nettoyeur Seyer de St-Hyacinthe in 1984 (silver), and won her first National Championships MVP award with Sherbrooke in 1988.

At the 1988 National Championships in Burlington, she had a 12-point game when she scored seven goals and five assists in a 20-0 win over Nova Scotia, a record that one reporter called "a game that would have made even Wayne Gretzky green with envy".

In 1988-89, she was again loaned to Sherbrooke for the 1989 National Championships in Coquitlam where she won her second national title. This time, Sherbrooke won 4-3 over the Toronto Aeros.

In 1989-90, she was picked up by Sherbrooke again for the National Championships and they became the first team to win the Canadian Final three years in a row.

She played for the Ferland Quatre Glaces (first based out of Brossard, and then Repentigny) team in the League Régionale du Hockey au Féminin in the province of Québec. She was the league's best player in 1991-92 and 1992-93.

She was the Most Valuable Player of the National Championships for the fifth time in 1998 when Équipe de Québec finished in third place and was awarded the Maureen McTeer Trophy.

She played in her last season in 2000-01 with the Montreal Wingstar. She also competed in her last National Championships that March with Hockey Québec (they lost the Canadian Final to the Calgary Oval X-Treme.

=== Lacrosse ===
In addition to hockey, St. Louis was an accomplished lacrosse player. She was a member of the Canadian Team from 1985 to 1989. She participated at the World Championships in Australia (1989) and the World Championships in Philadelphia (1986), where Canada finished in fourth place. St. Louis was part of the team that won the Gold medal at Canadian Championships in 1989.

== International play ==
France Saint-Louis
Medal record

Women's ice hockey

Representing Canada

Olympic Games
Silver medal – second place	1998 Nagano	Tournament

IIHF World Women's Championships
Gold medal – first place	1990 Canada	Tournament
Gold medal – first place	1992 Finland	Tournament
Gold medal – first place	1994 United States	Tournament
Gold medal – first place	1997 Canada	Tournament
Gold medal – first place	1999 Finland	Tournament

France St-Louis participated in the 1987 Women's World Hockey Tournament and was Canada's leading scorer.

She won five-straight gold medals at the IIHF Women's World Championships from 1990 to 1997. She served as Team Canada's captain at Finland 1992 and USA 1994. At those five tournaments, she scored combined 14 goals and 28 points in 25 career IIHF games.

She was part of the first five women's teams to win gold at the IIHF Women's World Championships.

In 1992, she co-led Team Canada with five goals in five games. In the Final, Team Canada won 8-0 over Team USA.

She was an alternate captain for Team Canada in 1996 at both the Pacific Rim tournament in Vancouver as well as the 3 Nations Cup in Ottawa.

At Nagano 1998, she helped Team Canada win a silver medal at the first women's Olympic hockey tournament. She scored three points in six games in Japan.

== Career statistics ==
=== Regular season and playoffs ===
			Regular season					Playoffs
Season	Team	League	GP	G	A	Pts	PIM	GP	G	A	Pts	PIM
1998-99	Bonaventure Wingstar	NWHL	17	13	11	24	4	n/a	n/a	n/a	n/a	n/a
1999	Hockey Québec	Nationals	-	-	-	-	-	5	2	8	10	n/a
1999-2000	Montreal Wingstar	NWHL	16	12	16	28	14	n/a	n/a	n/a	n/a	n/a
2000-2001	Montreal Wingstar	NWHL	25	16	19	35	10	4	0	7	7	0

=== International ===
Year	Team	Event	Result	GP	G	A	Pts	PIM
1990	Canada	WC	1st place, gold medalist(s)	5	3	5	8	2
1992	Canada	WC	1st place, gold medalist(s)	5	5	3	8	2
1994	Canada	WC	1st place, gold medalist(s)	5	3	3	6	6
1997	Canada	WC	1st place, gold medalist(s)	5	1	2	3	2
1998	Canada	OG	2nd place, silver medalist(s)	6	1	2	3	0
1999	Canada	WC	1st place, gold medalist(s)	5	2	1	3	2

== Coaching ==
She was also an assistant coach for Team Quebec at the 1991 Canada Winter Games.

As part of the IIHF Ambassador and Mentor Program, St. Louis was a Hockey Canada coaching mentor that travelled to Bratislava, Slovakia to participate in the 2011 IIHF High Performance Women's Camp from July 4–12.

As of 2010, St. Louis was a consultant to the Montreal Carabins women's ice hockey program.

== Awards and honours ==
Award	Year
Order of Hockey in Canada	2014
Abby Hoffman Cup	1988, 1989, 1990, 1994, 1995, 1996, 1999
Most Valuable Player, National Championships	1988, 1990, 1991, 1997, 1998
Isobel Gathorne Hardy Award	2001
Québec Sports Hall of Fame (Panthéon des sports)	2003
Hockey Québec Hall of Fame (Temple de la renommée du hockey québécois)	2014

=== More honours ===
- Quebec Athlete of the Decade in Lacrosse (1980 to 1990)
- Quebec Athlete Award of Excellence in Women's hockey (1986 and 1991)
- Captain of the Canadian Women's team (1992–1994)
- Assistant captain of the Canadian Women's hockey team (1997)
- Nominated for Teammate Award of Excellence by the Quebec Hockey Federation (1994 and 1990)

Preceded by Sue Scherer (1990)	Captain; Cdn National Women's Ice Hockey Team; 1992–94	Succeeded by Stacy Wilson (1997–98)
