= Cheryl Pounder =

Canadian ice hockey player

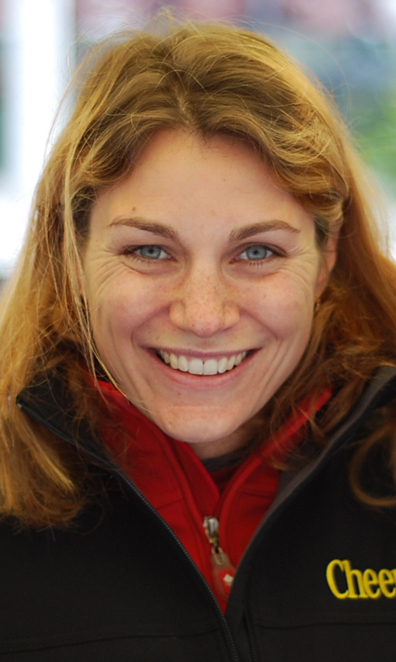
- Born: June 21, 1976 (age 50) Montreal, Quebec, Canada
- Height: 5 ft 4 in (163 cm)
- Weight: 145 lb (66 kg; 10 st 5 lb)
- Position: Defence
- Shot: Right
- CIS NWHL team: Laurier Golden Hawks; Beatrice Aeros
- National team: Canada
- Playing career: 1994–2007
Medal record
Representing Canada
Women's ice hockey
Olympic Games
Gold medal – first place	2002 Salt Lake City	Tournament
Gold medal – first place	2006 Turin	Tournament
IIHF World Women's Championships
Gold medal – first place	1994 United States	Tournament
Gold medal – first place	1999 Finland	Tournament
Gold medal – first place	2000 Canada	Tournament
Gold medal – first place	2001 United States	Tournament
Gold medal – first place	2004 Canada	Tournament
Gold medal – first place	2007 Canada	Tournament
Silver medal – second place	2005 Sweden	Tournament

Cheryl Pounder (born June 21, 1976) is a Canadian former ice hockey player who played for the Toronto Aeros and Mississauga Chiefs. She was a five-time Abby Hoffman Cup national champion, four times with the Aeros and once with the Chiefs. She won two gold medals with Canada at the Olympic Games. After her playing career, she has worked as a broadcaster.

Pounder attended high school at St. Martin Catholic Secondary School in Mississauga, Ontario. She was also the captain of the ice hockey team at Wilfrid Laurier University. Although born in Montreal, she lives in Mississauga, Ontario and calls that city her hometown.

== Playing career ==
Pounder was still a teenager when she joined the Toronto Aeros in the Central Ontario Women's Hockey League. She won her first Abby Hoffman Cup as a national champion in 1993.

She won her second Canadian title with the Aeros in 2000. She then won back-to-back titles with Aeros in 2004 and 2005.

She then joined the Mississauga Chiefs in the newly established Canadian Women's Hockey League in 2007. She won her fifth Abby Hoffman Cup in 2008. She was named a CWHL First All-Star Team defender in her final season.

=== International career ===
Pounder was part of the team that won the Under-18 Canadian National women's ice hockey championship. She was also a member of the 1992 Women's World Roller Hockey championship team.

Pounder competed in the 2002 and 2006 Winter Olympics.

== Post-playing career ==
Pounder was a colour commentator for the CBC coverage of the women's hockey tournament at the 2014, 2018, and 2022 Winter Olympics. She also served as a colour commentator for the TSN's coverage of IIHF World Women's Championship hockey tournaments and succeeded Ray Ferraro as NHL 24 colour commentator.. Pounder remained as colour commentator until she was replaced by Darren Pang in NHL 27.

Pounder was the Master of Ceremonies at the 2010 CWHL Draft.

Pounder regularly provides commentary for the Professional Women's Hockey League. She called the inaugural game of the league alongside Daniella Ponticelli.

== Personal life ==
Pounder is married to Mike O'Toole, a former hockey player who was selected by the St. Louis Blues in the 1986 NHL entry draft, but did not play in the NHL. Together, they have two daughters: Jamie, born on January 25, 2008, and Lauren, was born in 2010.

Her niece Rhyen McGill won the NCAA national championship in 2017 with Clarkson University, and played in Team Canada's junior system.

== Career statistics ==
Career statistics are from Eliteprospects.com.

=== Regular season and playoffs ===
			Regular season					Playoffs
Season	Team	League	GP	G	A	Pts	PIM	GP	G	A	Pts	PIM
1992–93	Toronto Aeros	COWHL	24	4	8	12	6	—	—	—	—	—
1993–94	Toronto Jr. Aeros	COWHL	29	9	12	21	20	—	—	—	—	—
1995–96	North York Aeros	COWHL	26	1	20	21	4	—	—	—	—	—
1996–97	North York Aeros	COWHL	32	8	24	32	16	—	—	—	—	—
1997–98	North York Aeros	COWHL	16	1	17	18	8	—	—	—	—	—
1998-99	Beatrice Aeros	NWHL	25	0	15	15	4	—	—	—	—	—
1999-00	Beatrice Aeros	NWHL	31	1	15	16	32	—	—	—	—	—
2007–08	Mississauga Chiefs	CWHL	0	0	0	0	0	2	0	0	0	0
2008–09	Mississauga Chiefs	CWHL	25	3	15	18	16	—	—	—	—	—
COWHL totals			127	23	81	104	54	—	—	—	—	—

=== International ===
Year	Team	Event	Result	GP	G	A	Pts	PIM
1994	Canada	WC	1st place, gold medalist(s)	5	0	1	1	2
1999	Canada	WC	1st place, gold medalist(s)	5	0	0	0	0
2000	Canada	WC	1st place, gold medalist(s)	5	1	3	4	2
2001	Canada	WC	1st place, gold medalist(s)	5	0	5	5	2
2002	Canada	OG	1st place, gold medalist(s)	5	0	0	0	0
2004	Canada	WC	1st place, gold medalist(s)	5	0	3	3	2
2005	Canada	WC	2nd place, silver medalist(s)	5	2	1	3	4
2006	Canada	OG	1st place, gold medalist(s)	5	2	2	4	6
2007	Canada	WC	1st place, gold medalist(s)	5	0	0	0	2
Senior totals				45	5	15	20	20

== Career highlights ==
- Two Olympic gold medals (2002, 2006)
- Six World Championship gold medals (1994, 1999, 2000, 2001, 2004, 2007) and one silver (2005)
- Seven Nations Cup gold medals (1996, 1998, 1999, 2001, 2002, 2004, 2005) and one silver (2003)
- All-Star selection, 2005 IIHF women's world hockey championships

== Awards and honours ==
Award	Year
Abby Hoffman Cup	1993, 2000, 2004, 2005, 2008
Top Defender, National Championships	2002, 2004, 2007
COWHL Second All-Star Team	1996–97
NWHL West First All-Star Team	1999-2000
CWHL First All-Star Team	2008-09
OUA Second Team All-Star	1995–96, 1996–97
OUA First Team All-Star	1997–98
Wilfrid Laurier athletics President's Award	1998
Laurier Golden Hawk Hall of Fame	2005
