= 1998 3 Nations Cup =

Tournament details
- Host country: Finland
- Venues: 3 (in 3 host cities)
- Dates: 10–16 December
- Teams: 3

Final positions
- Champions: Canada (2nd title)
- Runners-up: United States
- Third place: Finland

Tournament statistics
- Games played: 6
- Goals scored: 34 (5.67 per game)
- Scoring leader(s): (Finland) Petra Vaarakallio (Finland) Karoliina Rantamäki (United States) Karen Bye (5 points)

The 1998 3 Nations Cup was a women's ice hockey tournament held in Finland from December 10–16, 1998. It was the third edition of the 3 Nations Cup.

== Results ==
=== Round robin ===
Pos	Team	Pld	W	L	T	GF	GA	GD	Pts
1	Canada	4	4	0	0	16	8	+8	8
2	United States	4	2	2	0	10	10	0	4
3	Finland (H)	4	0	4	0	8	16	−8	0

Source: Hockey Canada
(H) Hosts

10 December	United States	1–2 (0–0, 0–0, 1–2)	Canada	Kuortane

Game reference

Sara DeCosta
Goalies
Sami Jo Small

	0–1	45:44 – Goyette (Smith) (PP)
King – 56:04	1–1
	1–2	59:14 – Le (Dupuis)

16 min
Penalties
18 min
27
Shots
31

11 December	Finland	2–3 (2–2, 0–0, 0–1)	United States	Kuortane

12 December	Canada	8–4 (2–1, 4–0, 2–3)	Finland	Närpes

14 December	Canada	4–3 GWS (1–2, 1–0, 1–1) (OT 0–0) (SO: 1–0)	United States	Kuortane

15 December	United States	3–2 (1–0, 1–1, 1–1)	Finland	Kuortane

Game reference

Coelho – 07:11	1–0
Wendell (Fisher, Granato) – 25:34	2–0
	2–1	32:45 – Matilainen
Fisher (Blahoski) – 48:17	3–1
	3–2	50:17 – Hänninen

16 December	Finland	0–2 (0–1, 0–1, 0–0)	Canada	Kurikka

Game reference
Tuula Puputti	Goalies	Kim St-Pierre
0–1 / 19:46 – Campbell; 0–2 / 25:21 – Drolet (Goyette)
2 min	Penalties	8 min
12	Shots	45

== Statistics ==
=== Final standings ===
1st place, gold medalist(s)	Canada
2nd place, silver medalist(s)	United States
3rd place, bronze medalist(s)	Finland

=== Scoring leaders ===
Only the top ten skaters, sorted by points, then goals, are included in this list.

Player	GP	G	A	Pts	PIM	Pos
(Finland) Petra Vaarakallio	4	2	3	5	0	F
(Finland) Karoliina Rantamäki	4	2	3	5	0	F
(United States) Karen Bye	4	2	3	5	4	F
(Canada) Cassie Campbell	4	4	0	4	0	F
(Canada) Amanda Benoit	4	2	2	4	2	F
(Canada) Mai-Lan Le	4	2	1	3	0	F
(Canada) Nancy Drolet	4	2	1	3	6	F
(Canada) Vicky Sunohara	4	2	1	3	8	F
(United States) Sue Merz	4	1	2	3	4	D
(Finland) Sari Fisk	4	0	3	3	0	F

Source: Hockey Canada

==== Goaltending leaders ====
The four goaltenders, based on save percentage, who played at least 40% of their team's minutes, are included in this list.

Player	TOI	GA	GAA	SA	SV%	SO
(Canada) Sami Jo Small	110:00	2	1.09	49	.959	0
(United States) Sara DeCosta	190:00	7	2.21	90	.922	0
(Finland) Tuula Puputti	209:00	11	3.16	118	.907	0
(Canada) Kim St-Pierre	140:00	6	2.57	45	.867	1

Source: Hockey Canada
