= Kelly Bechard =

Canadian ice hockey player

- Born: January 22, 1978 (age 48) Sedley, Saskatchewan, Canada
- Height: 5 ft 9 in (175 cm)
- Weight: 146 lb (66 kg; 10 st 6 lb)
- Position: Forward
- WWHL CIS team: Calgary Oval X-Treme; Univ. of Calgary Dinos
- National team: Canada
- Playing career: 1996–2008
Medal record
Representing Canada
Women's ice hockey
Olympic Games
Gold medal – first place	2002 Salt Lake City	Tournament
IIHF World Women's Championships
Gold medal – first place	2000 Canada	Tournament
Gold medal – first place	2001 United States	Tournament
Gold medal – first place	2004 Canada	Tournament
Gold medal – first place	2007 Canada	Tournament
Silver medal – second place	2005 Sweden	Tournament
Silver medal – second place	2008 China	Tournament

Kelly Paige Bechard (born January 22, 1978) is a Canadian ice hockey coach and former player. She played for the Calgary Oval X-Treme, Brampton Thunder, and Mississauga Aeros. She won a gold medal with Canada at the 2002 Winter Olympics in Salt Lake City.

Born in Sedley, Saskatchewan, Bechard was a provincial doubles badminton champion in High School. She played university hockey for the University of Calgary. In club hockey, she was a four-time Abby Hoffman Cup national champion, three times with Calgary and once with Brampton.

== Playing career ==
=== College hockey ===
In 1998, she was named to the CIAU’s First All-Star team and was presented the Award of Merit. After the Olympics, Bechard returned to the University of Calgary, where she played for the university’s hockey team, and pursued a degree in management.

=== Club career ===
Bechard played in the National Women's Hockey League and the Western Women's Hockey League. She scored a goal in the 2003 Women's National Hockey Championship to help Team Alberta win the Abby Hoffman Cup.

== International play ==
Bechard competed for Canada at the World Championships in 2000 and 2001.

In the 2002 gold medal game, Bechard was called for a tripping penalty late in the third period, and this led to Karyn Bye of the United States scoring a goal. The goal made the score 3-2 in Canada’s favour, as Bechard was part of the first Canadian Women's Hockey Gold Medal hockey team in Olympic history.

== Coaching ==
From 2010-2014 she was assistant coach for the university of Calgary Dino’s, she took over head coach for the 2013-14 season. After that she left to be the assistant coach for the Calgary Inferno for their 2017-18 season. Bechard is now back as an assistant coach for the university of Calgary Dino’s

== Awards and honours ==
Award	Year
Abby Hoffman Cup	1998, 2001, 2003, 2006
NWHL Championship	2002-03, 2003-04
WWHL Championship	2004-05, 2007-08
CIS All Canadian Team	1997-98
Dinos Hall of Fame	2017
Canada West Hall of Fame	2022
