= Nancy Drolet =

Canadian ice hockey player

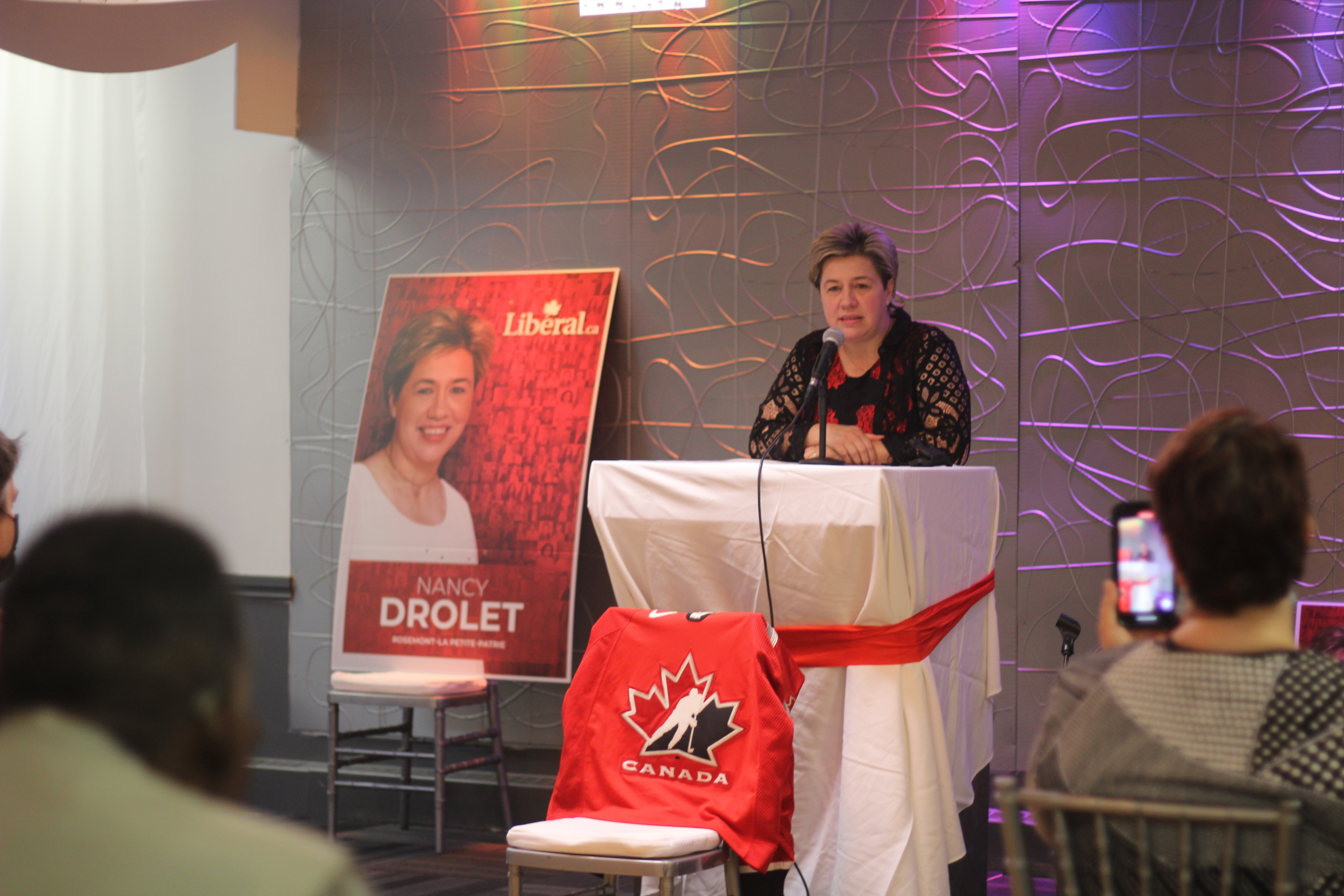
- Nancy Drolet giving a speech at her campaign's inauguration
- Born: August 2, 1973 (age 53) Drummondville, Quebec, Canada
- Height: 5 ft 6 in (168 cm)
- Weight: 140 lb (64 kg; 10 st 0 lb)
- Position: Forward
- Shot: Left
- National team: Canada
- Playing career: 1991–2004
Medal record
Representing Canada
Women's ice hockey
Olympic Games
Silver medal – second place	1998 Nagano	Tournament
IIHF World Women's Championships
Gold medal – first place	1992 Finland	Tournament
Gold medal – first place	1994 United States	Tournament
Gold medal – first place	1997 Canada	Tournament
Gold medal – first place	1999 Finland	Tournament
Gold medal – first place	2000 Canada	Tournament
Gold medal – first place	2001 United States	Tournament

Nancy Drolet (born August 2, 1973) is a retired Canadian ice hockey player, international public speaker and philanthropist. She is the daughter of Denis Drolet and Viviane Dubé. Nancy has won 6 gold medals for Canada with the Canadian women's hockey team. Drolet was named Sports Federation Canada Junior Athlete of the Year in 1992. After her Olympic career, she started traveling the world and giving conferences in schools. Drolet is famous for her phrase School is the foundation of every child.

== Playing career ==
Drolet was also an accomplished softball player and was a member of the Canadian National Softball team in 1990 and 1991. Drolet played for Team Quebec at the 1991 Canada Winter Games and was also a member of the Vancouver Griffins. Drolet played for the Sherbrooke Jofa-Titan squad in the League Régionale du Hockey au Féminin in the province of Québec. In 1994, Drolet would become the team captain, and its general manager.

She won a silver medal at the Nagano Olympic Games in Japan and played for her country in six world championships. She twice scored goals in overtime to help Canada to wins in the 1997 and 2000 world championships. In doing so, became the first person in the history of the IIHF Women's World Hockey Championships to score two gold medal clinching goals in overtime. She accomplished the feats on April 6, 1997, and April 9, 2000. During the 1999–2000 season, Nancy Drolet played for the Sainte-Julie Pantheres and scored 29 goals and added 17 assists. She played also for Vancouver Griffins (2001–02 and 2002–03).

== Career statistics ==
=== Regular season and playoffs ===
			Regular season					Playoffs
Season	Team	League	GP	G	A	Pts	PIM	GP	G	A	Pts	PIM
1998–99	Montreal Jofa Titan	NWHL	19	15	6	21	29	—	—	—	—	—
1999–00	Sainte-Julie Pantheres	NWHL	29	26	17	43	16	—	—	—	—	—
2000–01	Sainte-Julie Pantheres	NWHL	2	0	4	4	0	—	—	—	—	—
2002-03	Vancouver Griffins	NWHL	23	19	10	29	14	—	—	—	—	—
2003-04	Quebec Avalanche	NWHL	17	7	7	14	12

=== International ===
Year	Team	Event	Result	GP	G	A	Pts	PIM
1992	Canada	WC	1st place, gold medalist(s)	5	4	4	8	0
1994	Canada	WC	1st place, gold medalist(s)	5	1	6	7	0
1997	Canada	WC	1st place, gold medalist(s)	5	4	2	6	2
1998	Canada	OG	2nd place, silver medalist(s)	6	1	2	3	10
1999	Canada	WC	1st place, gold medalist(s)	5	4	4	8	0
2000	Canada	WC	1st place, gold medalist(s)	5	1	1	2	0
2001	Canada	WC	1st place, gold medalist(s)	5	4	7	11	4

== Awards and honours ==
Award	Year
Abby Hoffman Cup	1988, 1989, 1990, 1994, 1995, 1996, 1999
Most Valuable Player, National Championships	1994
Elaine Tanner Award (Junior Athlete of the Year)	1992

=== Other honours ===
- Ordre de Drummondville

== Personal life ==
In 1994, she married her long-time partner Natalie Allaire in Quebec. Nancy and Natalie have one child together. Nancy has always traveled throughout her career and is looking to plant her roots with her long-time partner Natalie in Rosemont-La Petite-Patrie.

Drolet ran for the Liberal Party of Canada in the 2021 Canadian federal election in the riding of Rosemont—La Petite-Patrie finishing in second place.
