= Delaney Collins =

Canadian ice hockey player

- Born: May 2, 1977 (age 49) Pilot Mound, Manitoba, Canada
- Height: 5 ft 3 in (160 cm)
- Weight: 130 lb (59 kg; 9 st 4 lb)
- Position: Defence
- Shot: Left
- Played for: Concordia Stingers; Alberta Pandas; Calgary Oval X-Treme
- National team: Canada
- Playing career: 1997–2011
Medal record
Representing Canada
Women's ice hockey
World Championship
Gold medal – first place	2000 Canada
Gold medal – first place	2004 Canada
Gold medal – first place	2007 Canada
Silver medal – second place	2005 Sweden
Silver medal – second place	2008 China

Delaney Collins (born May 2, 1977) is a Canadian ice hockey coach and former player. She played for the New Westminster Lightning, Calgary Oval X-Treme, Strathmore Rockies, and Brampton Thunder.

She was a three-time Abby Hoffman Cup national champion with Calgary. She also won NWHL and WWHL playoff titles with Calgary.

She announced her retirement from international play on August 23, 2011.

== Playing career ==
=== University career ===
In 1998, she played with the Concordia Stingers of the CIAU. The Stingers won the 1998 CIAU championship and Collins was named to the CIAU All-Canadian team. Collins played with the University of Alberta Pandas women's ice hockey program from 2003 to 2005. She won the CIS National Championship with the Pandas in 2004. Collins assisted on the game-winning goal scored by Danielle Bourgeois in the 2004 CIS National Championship game.

=== Club career ===
She participated in numerous Esso Women's Nationals. Her first experience was in 1999 when she played with Team British Columbia (the team was from New Westminster). The following year, she would play with Team Alberta and win a bronze medal.

Collins won her first Abby Hoffman Cup in 2001. She won her second national title two years later.

She won her third national title in 2007 when Calgary beat the Etobicoke Dolphins. She scored for Calgary in the 2007 Abby Hoffman Cup Final.

=== Floorball ===
In 2010, Collins played for Team Canada's Women's National Floorball Team in the World Floorball Championship Qualification series against Team USA in Vancouver, British Columbia. She became the first player to suit up for Team Canada in both ice hockey and floorball.

== Coaching career ==
On August 23, 2011, Collins was hired as an assistant coach for the 2011–12 Mercyhurst Lakers women's ice hockey season. From 2011-16, Collins served on the coaching staff of the Mercyhurst Lakers where they attended he Frozen Four in 2012-13 and 2013-14. Collins was named an assistant coach of Canada's National Women's Under-18 Team for the 2014–15 and 2016-17 season and Head Coach for the 2017-2018 season. Collins was an Assistant Coach for Canada's National Women's Development Team in 2013-14 and 2015–16, which won gold at the 2016 Nations Cup in Fussen, Germany beating the Finnish National Team in overtime

== Awards and honours ==
Award	Year
Abby Hoffman Cup	2001, 2003, 2007
NWHL Championship	2002-03
WWHL Championship	2005-06, 2006-07, 2007-08
CIAU All-Canadian Team	1998
Canada West First Team All-Star	2004, 2005
CIS First All-Canadian Team	2004, 2005
CIS National Championship All-Star Team	2005
Manitoba Female Athlete of the Yeare	2007

=== Other awards ===
- MEDIA ALL-STAR TEAM – 2007 World Women's Championship
