= Cassie Campbell-Pascall =

Canadian ice hockey player and sportscaster

Cassie Campbell CM
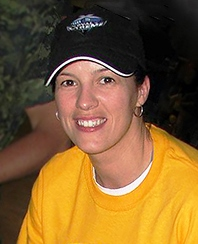
- Campbell-Pascall in 2006
- Born: November 22, 1973 (age 52) Richmond Hill, Ontario, Canada
- Height: 5 ft 6 in (168 cm)
- Weight: 134 lb (61 kg; 9 st 8 lb)
- Position: Left wing
- Shot: Left
- Played for: Calgary Oval X-Treme; Toronto Aeros; Mississauga Chiefs
- National team: Canada
- Playing career: 1990–2006
Medal record
Representing Canada
Olympic Games
Gold medal – first place	2002 Salt Lake City	Tournament
Gold medal – first place	2006 Turin	Tournament
Silver medal – second place	1998 Nagano	Tournament
IIHF World Women's Championships
Gold medal – first place	1994 United States	Tournament
Gold medal – first place	1997 Canada	Tournament
Gold medal – first place	1999 Finland	Tournament
Gold medal – first place	2000 Canada	Tournament
Gold medal – first place	2001 United States	Tournament
Gold medal – first place	2004 Canada	Tournament
Silver medal – second place	2005 Sweden	Tournament

Cassie Dawin Campbell-Pascall CM (born November 22, 1973) is a Canadian former ice hockey player who played for the Mississauga Chiefs, Toronto Aeros, and Calgary Oval X-Treme. She won two gold medals with Canada at the Olympic Games. After her playing career, she has worked as a broadcaster.

Born in Richmond Hill, Ontario, Campbell grew up in Brampton, Ontario, playing for the Brampton Canadettes. She attended high school at North Park Secondary School Brampton and played hockey for the University of Guelph. She was a three-time Abby Hoffman Cup national champion, once with Toronto and twice with Calgary.

She is a broadcaster for ESPN/ABC, and formerly Sportsnet. Campbell has done modeling and hosted women's hockey segments on TSN's hockey broadcasts. She was inducted into the IIHF Hall of Fame in 2026.

== Playing career ==
=== University hockey ===
Campbell played hockey at the University of Guelph.

=== Club career ===
Campbell played with the Mississauga Chiefs before she joined the Toronto Aeros. In 1999-2000, she won her first Abby Hoffman Cup as a national champion. She also won the NWHL Champions Cup that same season.

She then joined the Calgary Oval X-Treme and won her second national title in 2000-01. She won her third national title in 2002-03.

She played her last club season in 2004-05 when she won the WWHL Championship, then played one more season with Team Canada in 2005-06.

=== International career ===
She was the captain of the Canadian women's ice hockey team during the 2002 Winter Olympics and led the team to a gold medal. The left winger took on the role of captain again in the 2006 Winter Olympics in Turin, Italy, and again successfully led her team to a gold medal with a 4 – 1 win over Sweden.

== Post-playing career ==
Campbell retired from competitive hockey on August 30, 2006. She then joined Hockey Night in Canada as a rinkside reporter, becoming (on October 14, 2006) the first woman to do color commentary on a Hockey Night in Canada broadcast. She filled in when Harry Neale was snowed in at his home in Buffalo. She launched her website in the spring of 2008 and is a spokesperson for Scotiabank. She appears at corporate events for Scotiabank and contributed to a blog on the Scotia Hockey Club website.

In honour of Campbell's success, the City of Brampton and Mayor Susan Fennell named a new Recreation Centre, the Cassie Campbell Community Centre, which officially opened in September 2008. The Board of Hockey Canada as well as Canadian hockey icon Wayne Gretzky attended the unveiling.

On November 22, 2009, Campbell ran a leg in the Vancouver 2010 Olympic Torch relay, through the town of Cavendish, Prince Edward Island.

On November 26, 2013, after Rogers Communications secured a $5.2 billion deal with the National Hockey League for 12 years, Campbell joined Sportsnet's broadcast team, in addition to her Hockey Night in Canada role. Her last broadcast was the New York Rangers at the Toronto Maple Leafs game on December 19, 2023, after she accepted a new position as a special advisor role with the Professional Women's Hockey League (PWHL) and announced on the air that this was the end of her broadcasting career after that game. Though she left Sportsnet, she continues to work for ESPN in a smaller capacity.

During the 2010, 2014 Winter Olympics and 2018 Winter Olympics, Campbell provided colour commentary for women's hockey. She was inducted into the Ontario Sports Hall of Fame in 2012.

Before the 2018 Clarkson Cup finals, Campbell resigned from her role as a CWHL Governor. She also reported that she wanted to resign from the league in 2016, but stayed on at the request of the league. During the two years, her biggest involvement had been helping to secure sponsorships for the league.

Campbell won Best Sports Analysis or Commentary at the 9th Canadian Screen Awards in 2021.

Campbell later joined the NHL on ESPN, who would broadcast games for the first time in 17 years, as part of their new broadcast team for the 2021–22 season.

== Other work ==
Campbell also works as a motivational speaker for Speakers Spotlight, The Lavin Agency and The Sweeney Agency. She is also the author of a book which was released in October 2007. The book is titled H.E.A.R.T., a book co-written with Lorna Schultz Nicholson.

Her memoir, Just a Girl, was released in 2026.

== Personal life ==
Campbell was born in Richmond Hill, Ontario, and raised in Brampton, Ontario. She is related to Lucy Maud Montgomery, author of Anne of Green Gables.

Campbell is married to Brad Pascall, an assistant general manager of the NHL's Calgary Flames. They have a daughter, born in 2010.

In 2007, Campbell was inducted into the Canada's Sports Hall of Fame, the same year as Doug Flutie. The June 2007 issue of Chatelaine magazine featured Campbell on its cover for the second time.

On June 16, 2011, Campbell received an honorary degree from the University of Guelph.

On June 25, 2012, Campbell received the Order of Hockey in Canada. She was presented with the Canadian Women's Hockey League Humanitarian of the Year Award in March 2014. The award was presented to Campbell by Canadian Prime Minister Stephen Harper. On June 30, 2016, Campbell was made a Member of the Order of Canada (CM) by Governor General David Johnston for "contributions to Canadian women's hockey as a player, broadcaster and role model."

The Cassie Campbell Community Centre in Brampton, Ontario is named in her honour.

During May 2018, Campbell-Pascall was part of a group of four female athletes, including Fran Rider, Jen Kish and Kerrin Lee-Gartner to publicly pledge their brain to a Canadian research centre. The posthumous donation shall be made to Toronto Western Hospital's Canadian Concussion Centre to further research on the effect of trauma on women's brains.

== Career statistics ==
Career statistics are from Eliteprospects.com

=== Regular season ===
			Regular season
Season	Team	League	GP	G	A	Pts	PIM
1993–94	Mississauga Chiefs	COWHL	22	8	6	14	10
1995–96	Mississauga Chiefs	COWHL	19	2	7	9	12
1996–97	North York Aeros	COWHL	31	9	27	36	20
1998–99	Beatrice Aeros	NWHL	29	13	15	28	20
1999–00	Beatrice Aeros	NWHL	34	17	18	35	18
2003–04	Calgary Oval X-Treme	NWHL	9	7	8	15	6
NWHL totals			72	37	41	78	44

=== International ===
Year	Team	Event	Result	GP	G	A	Pts	PIM
1994	Canada	WC	1st place, gold medalist(s)	5	1	1	2	2
1997	Canada	WC	1st place, gold medalist(s)	5	2	6	8	4
1998	Canada	OG	2nd place, silver medalist(s)	6	1	2	3	8
1999	Canada	WC	1st place, gold medalist(s)	5	2	1	3	2
2000	Canada	WC	1st place, gold medalist(s)	5	3	3	6	0
2001	Canada	WC	1st place, gold medalist(s)	5	0	2	2	2
2002	Canada	OG	1st place, gold medalist(s)	5	2	1	3	2
2004	Canada	WC	1st place, gold medalist(s)	5	1	4	5	0
2005	Canada	WC	2nd place, silver medalist(s)	5	2	3	5	2
2006	Canada	OG	1st place, gold medalist(s)	5	0	5	5	2
Senior totals				51	14	28	42	24

== Awards and honours ==
Award	Year
Canada's Sports Hall of Fame	2007
Order of Hockey in Canada	2012
Abby Hoffman Cup	2000, 2001, 2003
NWHL Championship	1999-2000, 2002-03, 2003-04
WWHL Championship	2004-05
Top Forward at the National Championships	2000
CWHL Humanitarian Award	2013-14
Guelph Sportswoman of the Year	1996
Brampton Sports Hall of Fame	1997
Canada Games Hall of Honour	2009
Ontario Sport Legends Hall of Fame	2012
IIHF Hall of Fame	2026

== Other awards ==
- 2008 A community centre is named after her in Brampton, Ontario. Cassie Campbell Community Centre
- 2016 Member of the Order of Canada

Preceded by Therese Brisson (1999–2001)	Captain, Cdn National Women's Hockey Team; 2002–06	Succeeded by Hayley Wickenheiser (2007–2017)
