= Danielle Goyette =

Canadian ice hockey player (born 1966)

- Hockey Hall of Fame, 2017
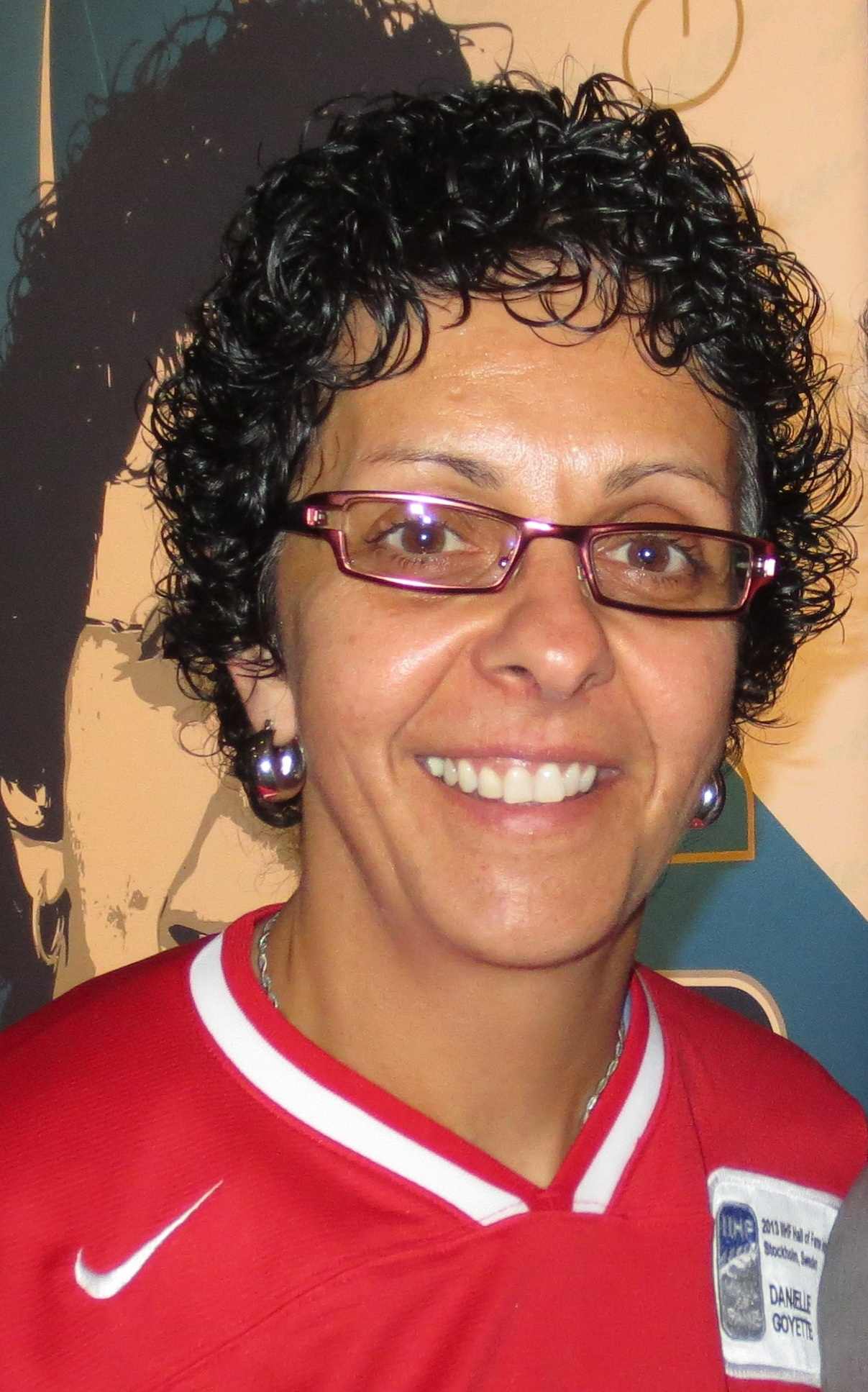
- Goyette in May 2013
- Born: January 30, 1966 (age 60) Saint-Nazaire, Quebec, Canada
- Height: 5 ft 7 in (170 cm)
- Weight: 148 lb (67 kg; 10 st 8 lb)
- Position: Forward
- Shot: Left
- Played for: Calgary Oval X-Treme
- Coached for: University of Calgary
- National team: Canada
- Playing career: 1991–2007

Danielle Goyette (born January 30, 1966) is a Canadian former ice hockey player who played on the Canada women's national ice hockey team. She is an eight-time champion of the Abby Hoffman Cup, the national women's championship of Canada. In 2013, she was inducted into the IIHF Hall of Fame. In 2017, she was inducted into the Hockey Hall of Fame. Goyette was made a member of the Order of Hockey in Canada in 2018.

== Early life ==
Born in Saint-Nazaire, Quebec, Goyette was one of eight children. She started playing hockey at age 15.

== Playing career ==
Goyette played for the Sherbrooke Jofa-Titan squad in the League Régionale du Hockey au Féminin under head coach David Downer, in the province of Québec.

Goyette won her first Abby Hoffman Cup at Hockey Canada's 1989 National Championships with Sherbrooke Christin Automobile. She was named Top Forward of the tournament.

At Hockey Canada's 1996 National Championships, Goyette scored a hat trick in the Canadian Final as the Hockey Québec all-stars lifted the Abby Hoffman Cup. Goyette was named the tournament's best forward.

In the 2003 she played for the Calgary Oval X-Treme in the National Women's Hockey League. Goyette scored a goal in the 2003 Esso Women's National Hockey Championship to help Team Alberta win the Abby Hoffman Cup.

At Hockey Canada's 2007 National Championships, she scored the last goal in the Canadian Final as the Oval X-Treme won their fourth Abby Hoffman Cup with a 3-0 win over the Etobicoke Dolphins. It was her record eighth and final Abby Hoffman Cup win.

== International career ==
Medal record

Representing Canada

Women's ice hockey

Olympic Games
Gold medal – first place	2002 Salt Lake City	Tournament
Gold medal – first place	2006 Turin	Tournament
Silver medal – second place	1998 Nagano	Tournament

IIHF World Women's Championships
Gold medal – first place	1992 Finland	Tournament
Gold medal – first place	1994 United States	Tournament
Gold medal – first place	1997 Canada	Tournament
Gold medal – first place	1999 Finland	Tournament
Gold medal – first place	2000 Canada	Tournament
Gold medal – first place	2001 United States	Tournament
Gold medal – first place	2004 Canada	Tournament
Gold medal – first place	2007 Canada	Tournament
Silver medal – second place	2005 Sweden	Tournament

In 1992, Goyette and Nancy Drolet led the Canadian team to victory at the world women's hockey championship. Goyette was named to the national team that same year.

In the gold medal game at the 1998 Winter Olympics, Goyette scored the only goal for Canada. It would be the first Canadian goal ever scored in an Olympic women’s ice hockey gold medal game. She ranked first at the 2002 Winter Olympics with 7 assists and tied for first with 10 points. Four years earlier, Goyette had 8 goals in the 1998 Olympics. She finished her international career with 113 goals and 105 assists while appearing in 171 games.

In 2006, Goyette was selected to carry the Canadian flag during the Opening Ceremonies of the 2006 Winter Olympics in Turin, Italy. She was the first member of a team sport to carry the Canadian flag since 1948.

Less than a month before her 42nd birthday, she announced her retirement. She was the oldest current member of Team Canada at the time of her retirement in 2008.

Goyette has won three Olympic medals, gold in both Turin (2006) and Salt Lake City (2002) and a silver medal in Nagano (1998). She also had success with Team Canada at the world championships, capturing seven Gold medals as well as one silver.

For the IIHF World Championships, Goyette is Canada's all-time leading scorer (29 goals and 53 points in eight tournaments).

== Coaching ==
In 2007, Goyette was named head coach of the University of Calgary Dinos women's hockey program. The Calgary Dinos won the women's 2011–12 Canadian Interuniversity Sport National Championships in Edmonton, Alberta. Goyette was named Canada West Conference Coach of the Year in 2019–20.

In the summer of 2010, Goyette participated in the evaluation camp for the 2010–11 Canadian national women's team. She was a coach for Canada Red (the camp was divided into four teams: Red, White, Yellow, Blue).

In 2019, she was named the director of player development for the Toronto Maple Leafs. In February 2022, the Newfoundland Growlers, the ECHL affiliate of the Maple Leafs, hired Goyette as a temporary assistant coach when head coach Eric Wellwood was unavailable to coach due to COVID-19 protocols, making Goyette the first woman to coach for an ECHL team.

== World championships ==
- 1992 – Tampere, Finland – Gold
- 1994 – Lake Placid, United States – Gold
- 1997 – Kitchener, Canada – Gold
- 1999 – Espoo, Finland – Gold
- 2000 – Mississauga, Canada – Gold
- 2001 – Minneapolis, United States – Gold
- 2004 – Halifax, Canada – Gold
- 2005 – Linköping, Sweden – Silver
- 2007 – Winnipeg, Manitoba, Canada – Gold

== Career statistics ==
=== Regular season and playoffs ===
			Regular season					Playoffs
Season	Team	League	GP	G	A	Pts	PIM	GP	G	A	Pts	PIM
2003–04	Calgary Oval X-Treme	NWHL	6	7	4	11	6	2	1	2	3	2
2006–07	Calgary Oval X-Treme	WWHL	2	2	2	4	0	—	—	—	—	—

=== International ===
Year	Team	Event	Result	GP	G	A	Pts	PIM
1992	Canada	WC	1st place, gold medalist(s)	5	3	7	10	2
1994	Canada	WC	1st place, gold medalist(s)	5	9	3	12	0
1997	Canada	WC	1st place, gold medalist(s)	7	1	2	3	2
1998	Canada	OG	2nd place, silver medalist(s)	6	8	1	9	10
1999	Canada	WC	1st place, gold medalist(s)	5	3	2	5	2
2000	Canada	WC	1st place, gold medalist(s)	5	6	1	7	0
2001	Canada	WC	1st place, gold medalist(s)	5	4	5	9	0
2002	Canada	OG	1st place, gold medalist(s)	5	3	7	10	0
2004	Canada	WC	1st place, gold medalist(s)	5	2	5	7	6
2005	Canada	WC	2nd place, silver medalist(s)	5	2	2	4	4
2006	Canada	OG	1st place, gold medalist(s)	5	4	2	6	6
2007	Canada	WC	1st place, gold medalist(s)	5	6	5	11	0

== Awards and honours ==
- Won the Abby Hoffman Cup a record eight times: 1989, 1990, 1994, 1995, 1996, 2001, 2003, 2007
- Most valuable player, 2003 Esso Women's Nationals
- Inducted into the IIHF Hall of Fame in 2013
- Inducted into the Hockey Hall of Fame in 2017
- Member of the Order of Hockey in Canada in 2018
