= 2008 Abby Hoffman Cup =

Canadian ice hockey championship trophy

Tournament details
- Venue(s): Charlottetown Civic Centre, Capital Arena
- Dates: March 11–15, 2008
- Teams: 8

Final positions
- Champions: Mississauga Chiefs (1st title)
- Runners-up: Brampton Canadettes-Thunder
- Third place: Calgary Oval X-Treme

Tournament statistics
- Games played: 16

Awards
- MVP: Hayley Wickenheiser (Calgary)

The 2008 Abby Hoffman Cup was the 27th and final staging of Hockey Canada's Esso Women's National Championships. The six-day competition was played in Charlottetown, Prince Edward Island. The Mississauga Chiefs won the Abby Hoffman Cup for the first time after a 3–2 double overtime victory over the Brampton Canadettes-Thunder.

The 2008 Hockey Canada competition featured the top-two teams from the Canadian Women's Hockey League and the top-two teams from the Western Women's Hockey League.

In the 2008 final, Mississauga's Cherie Piper scored the game winner in double overtime.

Alongside the four-team "club" division, a four-team "all-stars" division featured provincial teams from Manitoba, New Brunswick, Prince Edward Island, and Nova Scotia. Team Manitoba were the division winners.

In 2008-09, Hockey Canada's Women's National Championships for the Abby Hoffman Cup was replaced by the Clarkson Cup. Like the last edition of the Abby Hoffman Cup, the first edition of the Clarkson Cup featured the top-two teams from the CWHL and the top-two teams from the WWHL.

== Teams participating ==
- Calgary Oval X-Treme (WWHL), Alberta
- Minnesota Whitecaps (WWHL)
- Mississauga Chiefs (CWHL), Ontario
- Brampton Canadettes-Thunder (CWHL), Ontario
- Team Manitoba
- Team New Brunswick
- Team Prince Edward Island
- Team Nova Scotia

== Final round ==
=== Gold medal game ===
March 15, 2008; 16:00	(gold) Mississauga	3–2	Brampton (silver)	Attendance: 1,100

Game reference
			Referee: France Lapratte
Jen Raimondi, Cherie Piper, Cherie Piper / Goals / Vicky Sunohara, Gillian Apps			Referee: France Lapratte
36	Shots	40	Referee: France Lapratte
