= 2004–05 WWHL season =

The 2004–05 WWHL season was the first season of the Western Women's Hockey League. Previously this league did not exist and the western teams were in a division of the National Women's Hockey League.

== Final standings ==
Note: GP = Games played, W = Wins, L = Losses, T = Ties, GF = Goals for, GA = Goals against, Pts = Points.

| No. | Team | GP | W | L | T | GF | GA | Pts |
|---|---|---|---|---|---|---|---|---|
| 1 | Calgary Oval X-Treme | 21 | 20 | 0 | 1 | 152 | 18 | 51 |
| 2 | Minnesota Whitecaps | 12 | 8 | 3 | 1 | 34 | 23 | 40 |
| 3 | Edmonton Chimos | 21 | 12 | 8 | 1 | 65 | 53 | 34 |
| 4 | British Columbia Breakers | 21 | 5 | 15 | 1 | 49 | 98 | 14 |
| 5 | Saskatchewan Prairie Ice | 21 | 1 | 19 | 1 | 24 | 132 | 3 |

== Playoffs ==
Final round: Calgary Oval X-Treme vs Edmonton Chimos in Calgary, Alberta

Calgary Oval X-Treme win the WWHL Champions cup

Playoffs Stats
| No. | Team | GP | W | L | T | GF | GA |
|---|---|---|---|---|---|---|---|
| 1 | Calgary Oval X-Treme | 3 | 2 | 0 | 1 | 14 | 0 |
| 2 | Edmonton Chimos | 3 | 1 | 1 | 1 | 3 | 5 |
| 3 | Minnesota Whitecaps | 3 | 0 | 2 | 0 | 2 | 14 |

== Scoring Leaders ==
| | Player/Team | GP | Goal | Assist | Pts | Pen |
|---|---|---|---|---|---|---|
| 1 | Hayley Wickenheiser, Calgary Oval X-Treme | 21 | 24 | 38 | 62 | 20 |
| 2 | Danielle Goyette, Calgary Oval X-Treme | 21 | 23 | 26 | 59 | 14 |
| 3 | Dana Antal, Calgary Oval X-Treme | 18 | 16 | 17 | 33 | 6 |
| 4 | Kaley Hall, Calgary Oval X-Treme | 22 | 16 | 16 | 32 | 50 |
| 4 | Samantha Holmes, Calgary Oval X-Treme | 24 | 15 | 17 | 32 | 18 |
| 5 | Kelly Bechard, Calgary Oval X-Treme | 18 | 12 | 15 | 27 | 14 |
| 5 | Correne Bredin, Calgary Oval X-Treme | 24 | 2 | 25 | 27 | 22 |
| 6 | Colleen Sostorics, Calgary Oval X-Treme | 19 | 9 | 17 | 26 | 28 |

== Goalie Leaders ==
| | Player/Team | GP | W | SO | GAA |
|---|---|---|---|---|---|
| 1 | Brittony Chartier, Calgary Oval X-Treme | 14 | 12 | 5 | 0.50 |
| 2 | Amanda Tapp, Calgary Oval X-treme | 8 | 6 | 1 | 0.62 |
| 3 | Shari Vogt, Minnesota Whitecaps | 4 | 1 | 1 | 1.71 |
| 4 | Keely Brown, Edmonton Chimos | 13 | 6 | 2 | 2.36 |
| 5 | Lara Smart, Edmonton Chimos | 5 | 3 | 2 | 2.45 |
