= Dana Antal =

Canadian ice hockey player

- Born: April 19, 1977 (age 49) Saskatoon, Saskatchewan, Canada
- Height: 5 ft 7 in (170 cm)
- Weight: 140 lb (64 kg; 10 st 0 lb)
- Position: Forward
- Shot: Right
- Played for: Calgary Oval X-Treme
- National team: Canada
- Playing career: 2001–2005
Medal record
Representing Canada
Women's ice hockey
Olympic Games
Gold medal – first place	2002 Salt Lake City	Tournament
IIHF World Women's Championships
Gold medal – first place	2001 United States	Tournament
Gold medal – first place	2004 Canada	Tournament

Dana Antal (born April 19, 1977 in Saskatoon, Saskatchewan) is a Canadian former ice hockey player who played for the Calgary Oval X-Treme. She won a gold medal with Canada at the 2002 Winter Olympics in Salt Lake City.

Antal played collegiate hockey for Cornell University. She was a three-time Abby Hoffman Cup winner with the Calgary Oval X-Treme.

== Playing career ==
=== Minor hockey ===
Growing up in Esterhazy, Saskatchewan, Antal played minor hockey on local boys' teams until bantam (15 & under), as at the time, there were no girls' teams in the area.

=== College hockey ===
After completing her minor hockey career, Antal was offered a scholarship to play hockey at Cornell University. In her first season, she was named the Ivy League Rookie of the Year and was the team's leading scorer.

=== Club hockey ===
Dana Antal joined the Calgary Oval X-Treme where she won her first of three national titles in 1998. On March 22, 1998, she scored at 5:31 of a 10-minute overtime period on a pass from Jennifer Botterill and Nicole Beare as Calgary won the Abby Hoffman Cup with a 3-2 win over the Toronto Aeros. Antal scored two goals and added an assist in the Canadian Final.

Antal helped Calgary win the Abby Hoffman Cup again in 2001 and 2003. She scored a goal in the 2003 Women's National Hockey Championship to help Calgary win the Abby Hoffman Cup.

== International play ==
Antal was a member of the Canadian National Team that won gold at the Women’s World Hockey Championships in 2001. She was selected to the team in 2000 but was unable to play due to a torn anterior cruciate ligament. She was a member of the Canadian Olympic Team that won a gold medal at the 2002 Winter Olympics in Salt Lake City.

== Awards and honours ==
Award	Year
Abby Hoffman Cup	1998, 2001, 2003
NWHL Championship	2002-03, 2003-04
WWHL Championship	2004-05
Most Sportsmanlike, National Championships	1998
Ivy League Rookie of the Year	1995-96
First Team All-Ivy League	1996-97
