= 2003 Abby Hoffman Cup =

Canadian ice hockey championship trophy

Tournament details
- Venue(s): Sask Place, Schroh Arena
- Dates: March 12–16, 2003
- Teams: 10

Final positions
- Champions: Calgary Oval X-Treme (3rd title)
- Runners-up: Brampton Thunder
- Third place: Équipe Québec

Tournament statistics
- Games played: 29

Awards
- MVP: Danielle Goyette (Québec)

The 2003 Abby Hoffman Cup was the 22nd staging of Hockey Canada's Esso Women's National Championships. The five-day competition was played in Saskatoon, Saskatchewan. The Calgary Oval X-Treme won the Abby Hoffman Cup for the third time, this time after a 6–3 win over the Brampton Thunder.

In the final game, Samantha Holmes scored two goals including the winner.

== Teams participating ==
- Vancouver Griffins, British Columbia
- Calgary Oval X-Treme, Alberta
- Team Saskatchewan
- University of Manitoba, Manitoba
- Brampton Thunder, Ontario
- Équipe Québec
- Team New Brunswick
- PEI Humpty Dumpty Crunch, Prince Edward Island
- Team Nova Scotia
- Team Newfoundland & Labrador

== Final round ==
=== Gold medal game ===
| March 16, 2003; 19:30 | (gold) Calgary | 6-3 | Brampton (silver) | Sask Place; Attendance: 1100 |

Game reference
Dana Antal, Samantha Holmes, Danielle Goyette, Samantha Holmes, Kaley Hall, Kelly Bechard / Goals / Jayna Hefford, Jayna Hefford, Lori Dupuis
| 45 | Shots | 31 |
