= Geraldine Heaney =

Irish-Canadian ice hockey player and coach (born 1967)

- Hockey Hall of Fame, 2013
- Born: October 1, 1967 (age 59) Lurgan, Northern Ireland
- Height: 5 ft 8 in (173 cm)
- Weight: 140 lb (64 kg; 10 st 0 lb)
- Position: Defence
- Shot: Right
- Played for: Toronto Aeros
- Coached for: University of Waterloo; Toronto Six
- National team: Canada
- Playing career: 1990–2003
Medal record
Representing Canada
Women's ice hockey
Olympic Games
Gold medal – first place	2002 Salt Lake City	Tournament
Silver medal – second place	1998 Nagano	Tournament
IIHF World Women's Championships
Gold medal – first place	1990 Canada	Tournament
Gold medal – first place	1992 Finland	Tournament
Gold medal – first place	1994 United States	Tournament
Gold medal – first place	1997 Canada	Tournament
Gold medal – first place	1999 Finland	Tournament
Gold medal – first place	2000 Canada	Tournament
Gold medal – first place	2001 United States	Tournament

Geraldine Heaney (born October 1, 1967) is an Irish-Canadian ice hockey coach and former defenceman. She played 18 seasons and over 1,000 games with the Toronto Aeros organization, won six Ontario provincial championships and was named Ontario Women's Hockey Association (OWHA) most valuable defenceman on three occasions. The Aeros retired her jersey number 91 in 2006. Internationally, Heaney was a member of the Canadian national team in the first seven Women's World Championships, winning gold each time. She is a two-time Olympian, winning silver at the inaugural tournament in 1998 tournament, and gold in 2002. On June 14, 2022, she became the head coach of the Toronto Six of the Premier Hockey Federation.

A pioneer of women's hockey, Heaney is credited with aiding the growth of the sport. Her offensive prowess as a defenceman earned her comparisons to National Hockey League star Bobby Orr, particularly after she flew through the air after scoring the gold medal-winning goal in the inaugural world championship. In 2008, Heaney became one of the first three female inductees, along with Angela James and Cammi Granato, to the International Ice Hockey Federation (IIHF) Hall of Fame. She was the third woman, after James and Granato, to be inducted to the Hockey Hall of Fame, and was inducted into Canada's Sports Hall of Fame in 2014.

== Early life ==
Heaney was born on October 1, 1967, in Lurgan, County Armagh, Northern Ireland. Her parents, Mike and Kathleen Heaney, emigrated to Canada when Geraldine was one year old, but she retained pride in her Irish birth, often returning to Ulster. Her family settled in North York, Ontario, where she grew up and developed her passion for hockey, often playing goal for her brothers on outdoor rinks. A gifted athlete, Heaney also played Gaelic football, soccer, fastball and in-line hockey.

== Playing career ==
=== Toronto Aeros ===
Heaney first joined a girls' hockey team at age 10, playing against girls up to six years older than her. She joined the Toronto Aeros in 1980 at the age of 13. It began a career with the organization in which she played over 1,000 games at the senior level and later the National Women's Hockey League (NWHL). She was a member of six provincial championship winning teams and named the Ontario Women's Hockey Association's top defenceman on three occasions: 1987–88, 1991–92 and 1992–93.

While studying recreation facilities management at Seneca College in Toronto, Heaney was recruited to play volleyball, but immediately switched to hockey upon learning the school operated a women's team. In 1987, she led Seneca to an Ontario Colleges Athletic Association championship and was named to both her league and the provincial championship all-star teams.

Heaney was a member of four national championship teams with the Aeros. The only player to appear in the Esso Women's National Hockey Championship every season between 1987 and 2001, Heaney was named the best defender of the tournament in 1993, 1997 and 2001 and was named most valuable player in 1992. Three months pregnant with her first child, Heaney ended her club career in 2004 by scoring the overtime-winning goal to capture the national championship. In recognition of her 27-year playing career, the Aeros retired her uniform number 91 in 2006.

She was named Most Valuable Player of the 2001 NWHL Cup playoffs, notably finishing the playoffs with a four-point day in Toronto's 8-1 win over Sainte-Julie.

She was the overtime hero in the 2004 Abby Hoffman Cup when Toronto beat the defending champion Calgary Oval X-Treme in the Canadian Final. Heaney scored four goals and seven points at those 2004 National Championships.

=== International ===
The first International Ice Hockey Federation (IIHF) sanctioned Women's World Championship was played in 1990, in Ottawa. Heaney was selected for Team Canada, but as she was a landed immigrant, she had to rush the process of gaining citizenship before she could play. Canada and the United States were the class of the tournament and met in the final. Heaney scored the gold medal-winning goal in dramatic fashion as she deked around two American defencemen before sliding the puck into the net as she tripped over the goaltender and flew through the air in a fashion reminiscent of Bobby Orr's Stanley Cup-winning goal in 1969. The goal, coupled with her skills as an offensive defenceman led to Heaney becoming known as the "Bobby Orr of women's hockey".

The 1990 tournament marked the first of seven consecutive gold medal victories for Heaney, and she was the only player to appear in the first seven World Championships for Canada. She received the Directorate Award as the tournament's best defenceman at the 1992 and 1994 tournaments, and was named a tournament all-star in 1992.

Women's hockey was added as a full-medal sport for the first time at the 1998 Nagano Games, and Heaney was named to the Canadian Olympic team. While Canada had won every World Championship to that point, defeating the United States in the final each time, the Americans had begun to defeat Canada at other tournaments. Heaney scored two goals and added four assists in six games; however Canada lost the final to the United States, 3–1, and settled for the silver medal.

Heaney planned on the 2002 Salt Lake Games being her final tournament. She ended her international career with an Olympic gold medal after Canada defeated the United States 3–2 in the final. The final was controversial as the American referee called 13 of the final 16 penalties in the game against Canada. Heaney described the feeling of the Canadian players following the game: "We got an unbelievable number of penalties. We never had any idea that could happen. [The officials] tried to give them the game, and we weren't going to let that happen." In addition to celebrations in Canada, Heaney was recognized as a sporting hero in Northern Ireland.

Heaney also played in two World Ball Hockey Championships. She won a gold medal in 1992 and silver in 1994.

== Coaching ==
Heaney turned to coaching and spent six seasons as coach of the University of Waterloo Warriors women's hockey team, though the program often struggled as it lacked the resources compared to larger university programs. Heaney left Waterloo in 2012 to coach her daughter's novice team.

On June 14, 2022, Heaney was hired by the Toronto Six of the Premier Hockey Federation as the team's third head coach in franchise history.

== Legacy ==
An offensive defenceman, Heaney appeared in 125 games with the Canadian National Team, scored 27 goals and recorded 66 assists. In World Championship play, she holds Canadian records for most games (35), goals (8), assists (28) and points (36) for a defenceman. A pioneer of modern women's hockey, Heaney has been recognized by numerous institutions. She has been inducted into the Ontario Colleges Athletic Association and Canadian Ball Hockey Halls of Fame.

In 2008, Heaney joined countrywoman Angela James and American Cammi Granato as the first women inducted into the IIHF Hall of Fame. Proud of her induction, Heaney saw it as a sign of worldwide recognition of women's hockey, and added: "There are so many young girls playing hockey now, it's amazing. I really feel we need to promote the game worldwide, not just in Canada, and inducting women now should help that." Five years later, Heaney became the third woman (following James and Granato in 2010) to be inducted into the Hockey Hall of Fame as part of its 2013 class. She was scheduled to be inducted into Canada's Sports Hall of Fame as part of its 2014 class.

== Personal ==
Heaney settled in Ancaster, Ontario, following her playing career where she and her husband John are raising their two children, Shannon and Patrick.

== Career statistics ==
=== Regular season and playoffs ===
			Regular season					Playoffs
Season	Team	League	GP	G	A	Pts	PIM	GP	G	A	Pts	PIM
1986-87	Seneca College	CIAU	—	—	—	—	—	—	—	—	—	—
1987-88	Seneca College	CIAU	—	—	—	—	—	—	—	—	—	—
1992-93	Toronto Aeros	COWHL	21	8	12	20	14	—	—	—	—	—
1993-94	Toronto Aeros	COWHL	28	13	28	41	27	—	—	—	—	—
1995-96	North York Aeros	COWHL	29	21	28	49	20	—	—	—	—	—
1996-97	North York Aeros	COWHL	32	21	45	66	18	—	—	—	—	—
1998-99	Beatrice Aeros	NWHL	29	8	25	33	22	—	—	—	—	—
1999-00	Beatrice Aeros	NWHL	37	13	38	51	18	—	—	—	—	—
2000-01	Beatrice Aeros	NWHL	27	8	27	35	25	—	—	—	—	—
2002-03	Beatrice Aeros	NWHL	32	20	33	53	40	—	—	—	—	—
2003-04	Toronto Aeros	NWHL	32	8	19	27	30	2	0	1	1	0

=== International ===
Year	Team	Event	Result	GP	G	A	Pts	PIM
1990	Canada	WC	1st place, gold medalist(s)	5	2	6	8	4
1992	Canada	WC	1st place, gold medalist(s)	5	0	6	6	2
1994	Canada	WC	1st place, gold medalist(s)	5	1	6	7	8
1996	Canada	PRC	1st place, gold medalist(s)	5	2	3	5	0
1997	Canada	WC	1st place, gold medalist(s)	5	1	4	5	0
1997	Canada	3NC	1st place, gold medalist(s)	4	0	2	2	6
1997–98	Canada	Exh.	—	19	6	10	16	18
1998	Canada	Oly	2nd place, silver medalist(s)	6	2	4	6	2
1998	Canada	3NC	1st place, gold medalist(s)	4	0	0	0	2
1998–99	Canada	Exh.	—	7	1	1	2	0
1999	Canada	WC	1st place, gold medalist(s)	5	3	0	3	4
1999–00	Canada	Exh.	—	4	1	5	6	2
2000	Canada	WC	1st place, gold medalist(s)	5	0	1	1	4
2000	Canada	4NC	1st place, gold medalist(s)	4	3	1	4	4
2000–01	Canada	Exh.	—	9	0	6	6	0
2001	Canada	WC	1st place, gold medalist(s)	5	1	5	6	0
2001	Canada	3NC	1st place, gold medalist(s)	4	0	1	1	0
2002	Canada	Oly	1st place, gold medalist(s)	5	0	2	2	0
Totals				125	27	66	93	62

== Awards and honours ==
Award	Year
National
Most Valuable Player, Women's Nationals	1992
Best defender, Women's Nationals	1993; 1997; 2001
International
Best Defenceman, IIHF World Championship	1992; 1994
All-Star Team, IIHF World Championship	1992

== See also ==
- List of University of Waterloo people
