= 1999 Abby Hoffman Cup =

Canadian ice hockey championship trophy

Tournament details
- Venue: Hershey Centre
- Dates: March 25–28, 1999
- Teams: 8

Final positions
- Champions: Équipe Québec (4th title)
- Runners-up: Calgary Oval X-Treme
- Third place: North York Beatrice Aeros

Tournament statistics
- Games played: 20

Awards
- MVP: Hayley Wickenheiser (Calgary)

The 1999 Abby Hoffman Cup was the 18th staging of Hockey Canada's Esso Women's National Championships. The four-day competition was played in Mississauga, Ontario. Hockey Québec's all-star team won the Abby Hoffman Cup for the fourth time, this time after a 4–2 win over the Calgary Oval X-Treme.

In the final game, Nancy Drolet scored two goals including the winner.

== Teams participating ==
- New Westminster Lightning, British Columbia
- Calgary Oval X-Treme, Alberta
- Team Saskatchewan
- Manitoba Tazmanian Devils
- North York Beatrice Aeros, Ontario
- Équipe Québec
- Team New Brunswick
- Team Prince Edward Island
