= 1991 Abby Hoffman Cup =

Canadian ice hockey championship trophy

Tournament details
- Venue: Verdun Auditorium
- Dates: March 14–17, 1991
- Teams: 8

Final positions
- Champions: North York Aeros (1st title)
- Runners-up: Sherbrooke Christin Autos
- Third place: Edmonton Chimos

Tournament statistics
- Games played: 20

Awards
- MVP: France St-Louis (Sherbrooke)

The 1991 Abby Hoffman Cup was the 10th staging of Hockey Canada's Women's National Championships. The four-day competition was played in Verdun, Quebec. The North York Aeros won the Abby Hoffman Cup for the first time after a 1–0 shutout win over Sherbrooke Christin Autos, the three-time national champions from Québec.

In the final game, Angela James scored the only goal in the second period. Teammate Carrie-Lynn Perry was the first goalie to post a shutout in the final.

== Teams participating ==
- Surrey Flyers, British Columbia
- Edmonton Chimos, Alberta (Host)
- Saskatchewan Saskies
- Norvilla Canadians, Manitoba
- North York Aeros, Ontario
- Sherbrooke Christin Autos, Québec
- Aréna de Repentigny, Québec
- Moncton Shooters, New Brunswick
