= 2006 Abby Hoffman Cup =

Canadian ice hockey championship trophy

Tournament details
- Venue(s): C200 Centre, Cape Breton University
- Dates: March 8–12, 2006
- Teams: 9

Final positions
- Champions: Brampton Thunder (1st title)
- Runners-up: Axion de Montréal
- Third place: Calgary Oval X-Treme

Tournament statistics
- Games played: 26

Awards
- MVP: Annie Desrosiers (Montréal)

The 2006 Abby Hoffman Cup was the 25th staging of Hockey Canada's Esso Women's National Championships. The five-day competition was played in Sydney, Nova Scotia. The Brampton Thunder won the Abby Hoffman Cup for the first time with a 2–1 win over the Axion de Montréal.

In the final game, Brampton's Vicky Sunohara scored the winner late in the second period.

== Teams participating ==
- Hockey BC
- Calgary Oval X-Treme, Alberta
- Team Manitoba
- Brampton Thunder, Ontario
- Axion de Montréal
- Team New Brunswick
- Team Prince Edward Island
- Team Nova Scotia
- Team Newfoundland & Labrador

== Final round ==
=== Gold medal game ===
March 12, 2006; 13:30	(gold) Brampton	2-1	Montréal (silver)

Game reference
			Referee: Theresa Llorente
Kristy Zamora, Vicky Sunohara / Goals / Lisa-Marie Breton			Referee: Theresa Llorente
38	Shots	27	Referee: Theresa Llorente
