= 2000 Abby Hoffman Cup =

Canadian ice hockey championship trophy

Tournament details
- Venue: C200 Arena
- Dates: March 8–12, 2000
- Teams: 10

Final positions
- Champions: North York Beatrice Aeros (3rd title)
- Runners-up: Équipe Québec
- Third place: Calgary Oval X-Treme

Tournament statistics
- Games played: 29

Awards
- MVP: Hayley Wickenheiser (Calgary)

The 2000 Abby Hoffman Cup was the 19th staging of Hockey Canada's Esso Women's National Championships. The four-day competition was played in Sydney, Nova Scotia. The North York Beatrice Aeros won the Abby Hoffman Cup for the third time, this time after a 2–1 overtime win over Hockey Québec's all-stars.

In the final game, Lara Perks scored the winner in overtime.

== Teams participating ==
- Britannia Blues, British Columbia
- Calgary Oval X-Treme, Alberta
- Team Saskatchewan
- University of Manitoba, Manitoba
- North York Beatrice Aeros, Ontario
- Équipe Québec
- Team New Brunswick
- Team Prince Edward Island
- Team Nova Scotia
- Team Newfoundland & Labrador

== Final round ==
=== Gold medal game ===
March 12, 2000; 20:00	(gold) Toronto	2-1	Québec (silver)	C200 Arena

Game reference
Kendra Fisher	Goalies	Kim St-Pierre
Amy Turek, Lara Perks / Goals / Caroline Ouellette
