= 2002 Abby Hoffman Cup =

Canadian ice hockey championship trophy

Tournament details
- Venue(s): Nick Smith Centre, Ma-te-way Activity Centre
- Dates: March 6–10, 2002
- Teams: 10

Final positions
- Champions: Équipe Québec (5th title)
- Runners-up: North York Beatrice Aeros
- Third place: Brampton Thunder

Tournament statistics
- Games played: 29

Awards
- MVP: Kim St-Pierre (Québec)

The 2002 Abby Hoffman Cup was the 21st staging of Hockey Canada's Esso Women's National Championships. The five-day competition was played in Arnprior and Renfrew, Ontario. Hockey Québec's all-stars won the Abby Hoffman Cup for the fifth time, this time with a 1–0 win over the North York Aeros.

In the final game, Lisa-Marie Breton scored the only goal while Kim St-Pierre posted Québec's sixth shutout in a row.

With such a tight schedule, games up until the Canadian Final were just 45 minutes long (three period of 15 minutes), with the exception of games that needed 10 minutes of overtime. The Canadian Final on March 10 was 60 minutes long (three periods of 20 minutes).

== Teams participating ==
- Richmond Steelers, British Columbia
- Calgary Oval X-Treme, Alberta
- Team Saskatchewan
- University of Manitoba, Manitoba
- North York Beatrice Aeros, Ontario
- Brampton Thunder, Ontario
- Équipe Québec
- PEI Humpty Dumpty Crunch, Prince Edward Island
- Team Nova Scotia
- Team Newfoundland & Labrador

== Final round ==
=== Gold medal game ===
March 10, 2002; 19:00	(gold) Québec	1-0	Toronto (silver)	Nick Smith Centre; Attendance: 2817

Game reference
Kim St-Pierre	Goalies	Kendra Fisher	Referee: Chantal Champagne; Linesmen: Geneviève Fagnan; Christine Pellerin
Lisa-Marie Breton / Goals			Referee: Chantal Champagne; Linesmen: Geneviève Fagnan; Christine Pellerin
18	Shots	43	Referee: Chantal Champagne; Linesmen: Geneviève Fagnan; Christine Pellerin
