= 2007 Abby Hoffman Cup =

Canadian ice hockey championship trophy

Tournament details
- Venue: Sunwave Centre
- Dates: March 5–10, 2007
- Teams: 9

Final positions
- Champions: Calgary Oval X-Treme (4th title)
- Runners-up: Etobicoke Dolphins
- Third place: Mississauga Aeros

Tournament statistics
- Games played: 26

Awards
- MVP: Hayley Wickenheiser (Calgary)

The 2007 Abby Hoffman Cup was the 26th staging of Hockey Canada's Esso Women's National Championships. The six-day competition was played in Salmon Arm, British Columbia. The Calgary Oval X-Treme won the Abby Hoffman Cup for the fourth time, this time after a 3–0 win over the Etobicoke Dolphins.

In the final game, Calgary's Gina Kingsbury scored the winner while Amanda Tapp posted the shutout.

== Teams participating ==
- Hockey BC
- BC Outback, British Columbia
- Calgary Oval X-Treme, Alberta
- Team Manitoba
- Mississauga Aeros, Ontario
- Etobicoke Dolphins, Ontario
- Team New Brunswick
- Team Prince Edward Island
- Team Nova Scotia

== Final round ==
=== Gold medal game ===
March 10, 2007; 13:00	(gold) Calgary	3–0	Etobicoke (silver)

Game reference
			Referee: Chris Pellerin
Gina Kingsbury, Delaney Collins, Danielle Goyette / Goals			Referee: Chris Pellerin
50	Shots	25	Referee: Chris Pellerin
