= 1998 Abby Hoffman Cup =

Canadian ice hockey championship trophy

Tournament details
- Venue(s): Max Bell Centre, Father David Bauer Arena
- Dates: March 19–22, 1998
- Teams: 10

Final positions
- Champions: Calgary Oval X-Treme (1st title)
- Runners-up: North York Beatrice Aeros
- Third place: Équipe Québec

Tournament statistics
- Games played: 29

Awards
- MVP: France St-Louis (Québec)

The 1998 Abby Hoffman Cup was the 17th staging of Hockey Canada's Esso Women's National Championships. The four-day competition was played in Calgary, Alberta. The host team Calgary Oval X-Treme won the Abby Hoffman Cup for the first time after a 3–2 overtime win over Ontario's North York Aeros.

In the final game, Dana Antal scored the overtime winner for Calgary.

== Teams participating ==
- New Westminster Lightning, British Columbia
- Calgary Oval X-Treme, Alberta (Host)
- Edmonton Chimos, Alberta
- Team Saskatchewan
- Manitoba Tazmanian Devils
- North York Beatrice Aeros, Ontario
- Équipe Québec
- Maritime Sports Blades, New Brunswick
- Team Prince Edward Island
- Team Nova Scotia
