= 2004 Abby Hoffman Cup =

Canadian ice hockey championship trophy

Tournament details
- Venue(s): Sherwood Park Arena, Millennium Place
- Dates: March 10–14, 2004
- Teams: 10

Final positions
- Champions: Toronto Aeros (4th title)
- Runners-up: Calgary Oval X-Treme
- Third place: Edmonton Chimos

Tournament statistics
- Games played: 29

Awards
- MVP: Hayley Wickenheiser (Calgary)

The 2004 Abby Hoffman Cup was the 23rd staging of Hockey Canada's Esso Women's National Championships. The five-day competition was played in Sherwood Park, Alberta. The Toronto Aeros won the Abby Hoffman Cup for the fourth time, this time after a 2–1 overtime win over Calgary Oval X-Treme.

In the final game, Toronto captain Geraldine Heaney scored the winner in overtime.

== Teams participating ==
- Hockey BC
- Calgary Oval X-Treme, Alberta
- Edmonton Chimos, Alberta
- Team Saskatchewan
- University of Manitoba, Manitoba
- Toronto Aeros, Ontario
- Équipe Québec
- Team New Brunswick
- PEI Humpty Dumpty Crunch, Prince Edward Island
- Team Nova Scotia
- Team Newfoundland & Labrador

== Final round ==
=== Gold medal game ===
March 14, 2004; 19:30	(gold) Toronto	2-1	Calgary (silver)	Sherwood Park Arena; Attendance: 1800

Jennifer Butsch, Geraldine Heaney / Goals / Hayley Wickenheiser
