= 2002–03 NWHL season =

== Final standings ==
Note: GP = Games played, W = Wins, L = Losses, T = Ties, OTL = Overtime losses, GF = Goals for, GA = Goals against, Pts = Points.

Eastern Division
No.	Team	GP	W	L	T	OTL	GF	GA	Pts
1	Montreal Wingstar	36	18	15	3	0	83	81	39
2	Ottawa Raiders	36	13	20	1	2	96	122	29
3	Quebec Avalanche	36	10	20	5	1	87	120	26

Central Division
No.	Team	GP	W	L	T	OTL	GF	GA	Pts
1	Beatrice Aeros	36	32	3	1	0	201	54	65
2	Brampton Thunder	36	27	9	0	0	152	71	54
3	Mississauga Chiefs	36	19	13	3	1	122	111	42
4	Telus Lightning	36	0	34	1	1	54	236	2

Western Division
No.	Team	GP	W	L	T	OTL	GF	GA	Pts
1	Calgary Oval X-Treme	24	23	1	0	0	144	37	46
2	Vancouver Griffins	24	10	13	0	1	82	92	21
3	Edmonton Chimos	24	3	20	0	1	35	132	7

== Playoffs ==
- Calgary Oval X-Treme 3, Beatrice Aeros 0

The Calgary Oval X-treme won the Championship of the NWHL.

== 2003 Canadian championships ==
The Calgary Oval X-Treme and the Brampton Thunder competed in the 2003 Esso Women's National Hockey Championship. Calgary Oval X-treme won by a score of 6–3 in front of over 1,100 fans at Saskatchewan Place. Samantha Holmes scored twice while Colleen Sostorics and Delaney Collins each contributed two assists. Calgary Oval X-treme outscored their opponents in the tournament 46 to 10. With the win, Calgary Team was awarded the Abby Hoffman Cup.

=== Players of the game ===
- Dana Antal, Calgary Oval X-Treme
- Jayna Hefford, Brampton Thunder

=== Scoring summary ===
Period	Goal scored by	Team	Assisted by	Time of Goal
1	Jayna Hefford	Brampton Thunder	Vicky Sunohara	9:50
1	Dana Antal	Calgary Oval X-Treme	Colleen Sostorics, Delaney Collins	14:59 Power Play
1	Samantha Holmes	Calgary Oval X-Treme	Colleen Sostorics, Delaney Collins	15:34 Power Play
1	Danielle Goyette	Calgary Oval X-Treme	Kelly Bechard, Becky Klein-Swormink	16:02
2	Samantha Holmes	Calgary Oval X-Treme	Unassisted	4:20
2	Kayley Hall	Calgary Oval X-Treme	Jenel Bode, Cassie Campbell	4:41
2	Jayna Hefford	Brampton Thunder	Lori Dupuis	12:00 Power Play
2	Lori Dupuis	Brampton Thunder	Vicky Sunohara	19:12
3	Kelly Bechard	Calgary Oval X-Treme	Danielle Goyette, Dana Antal	4:04

- Shots per period

Team	Period 1	Period 2	Period 3	Total
Calgary Oval X-Treme	13	15	17	45
Brampton Thunder	8	17	6	31

- Goaltending Stats

Player	Team	Shots	Saves	Minutes
Brittony Chartier	Calgary Oval X-Treme	31	28	60
Erika Silva	Brampton Thunder	45	39	59

== See also ==
- National Women's Hockey League (1999–2007) (NWHL)
