= 1988 Abby Hoffman Cup =

Canadian ice hockey championship trophy

Tournament details
- Venue: Central Arena
- Dates: March 16–20, 1988
- Teams: 9

Final positions
- Champions: Sherbrooke Christin Autos (1st title)
- Runners-up: Edmonton Chimos
- Third place: Hamilton Golden Hawks

Tournament statistics
- Games played: 24

Awards
- MVP: France St-Louis (Sherbrooke)

The 1988 Abby Hoffman Cup was the seventh staging of Hockey Canada's Women's National Championships, and the first time without a title sponsor. The five-day competition was played in Burlington, Ontario. Sherbrooke Christin Auto won the Abby Hoffman Cup for the first time after a 4–3 overtime victory over the Edmonton Chimos.

In the final game, France St-Louis scored the winner in overtime. St-Louis was named the tournament's most valuable player.

In the group phase, St-Louis had a 12-point game when she scored seven goals and five assists in a 20-0 win over Nova Scotia, a record that one reporter called "a game that would have made even Wayne Gretzky green with envy".

== Teams participating ==
- New Westminster Silver Hawks, British Columbia
- Edmonton Chimos, Alberta (Host)
- Saskatchewan
- Manitoba
- Hamilton Golden Hawks, Ontario
- Sherbrooke Christin Autos, Québec
- Moncton Jaguars, New Brunswick
- Prince Edward Island
- Nova Scotia
