= 1993 Abby Hoffman Cup =

Canadian ice hockey championship trophy

Tournament details
- Venue: Jim Durrell Recreation Centre
- Dates: March 25–28, 1993
- Teams: 8

Final positions
- Champions: Toronto Aeros (2nd title)
- Runners-up: Edmonton Chimos
- Third place: Les 4 Glaces de Repentigny

Tournament statistics
- Games played: 20

Awards
- MVP: Jane Lagacé (Robinson)

The 1993 Abby Hoffman Cup was the 12th staging of Hockey Canada's Women's National Championships. The four-day competition was played in Ottawa, Ontario. Ontario's Toronto Aeros won the Abby Hoffman Cup for the second time in three years after a 4–3 win over Alberta's Edmonton Chimos.

In the final game, Stephanie Boyd scored the winner midway through the third period.

== Teams participating ==
- Vancouver Bladerunners, British Columbia
- Edmonton Chimos, Alberta
- Strongfield Agro-Athletics, Saskatchewan
- University of Manitoba, Manitoba
- Toronto Aeros, Ontario
- Ottawa Patriots, Ontario (Host)
- Les 4 Glaces de Repentigny, Québec
- Moncton T & R Sports, New Brunswick
