= Vancouver Griffins =

- City: Vancouver, Canada
- League: National Women's Hockey League
- Division: Western
- Founded: 2000
- Folded: 2003
- Home arena: Queen's Park Arena
- Colours: Dark blue, red & blue grey
- Owner: Phillip DeGrandpre
- General manager: Nancy Wilson
- Head coach: Sylvain Leone, Nancy Wilson
- Captain: Cammi Granato

The Vancouver Griffins were a professional women's ice hockey team in the National Women's Hockey League (NWHL). The team played its home games in Queen's Park Arena, in New Westminster, British Columbia, Canada.

== History ==
The team was established in January 2000 by local businessman Phillip DeGrandpre. The Griffins were voted in by the NWHL in May 2000. The Griffins would become the first expansion team for the NWHL outside their traditional Ontario and Quebec base.

In 2000–01, the Vancouver Griffins played 18 exhibition games against Canadian Interuniversity Athletics Union (CIAU) teams, British Columbia and Alberta provincial women's teams, and NWHL teams. The first head coach of the Griffins was Sylvain Leone. The club's first roster was selected at a training camp in August 2000 in Abbotsford, British Columbia. In the 2000–01 season, the only players that were not from British Columbia were goalie Krista Cloutier of Pickardville, Alberta, and forward Julia Berg, a member of the Norway women's national ice hockey team.

For the Griffins' 2001–02 season, the team was owned by British Columbia Sports Hall of Fame inductee Diane Nelson. The head coach was Nancy Wilson. Olympians Nancy Drolet of Canada women's national ice hockey team, Cammi Granato) and Shelley Looney of the United States women's national ice hockey team joined Vancouver Griffins. The Griffins' roster also included Burnaby's own 18-year-old Natashia Pellatt, a graduate of Moscrop Secondary School. Other younger players included 15-year-old Courtney Unrah. The team played 31 exhibition games against local, CIAU, British Columbia and Alberta provincial women's teams, and NWHL teams. One of the highlights of the 2001–02 season was a victory over Hayley Wickenheiser and her Edmonton Chimos club by a 7–1 score. Nancy Drolet had a hat trick and Cammi Granato scored the other four goals against Edmonton.

The Griffins joined the Calgary Oval X-Treme and Edmonton Chimos as a fully scheduled three team division in the NWHL for the 2002-03 season. The Griffins disbanded at the end of that season.

== Season-by-season ==
Year by year
Year	GP	W	L	T	OTL	GF	GA	Pts
2000-01	18	14	4	0	-	91	43	28
2001-02	31	27	4	0	-	84	14	54
2002-03	24	10	13	0	1	82	92	21

Note: GP = Games played, W = Wins, L = Losses, T = Ties, OTL = Overtime losses, GF = Goals for, GA = Goals against, Pts = Points.

== Season standings ==
Year	Regular season	Playoffs
2000-01	Exhibition games only	
2001-02	Exhibition games only	
2002-03	2rd, Western Division	no participation to playoff

== Inaugural Roster (2000-01) ==
Goalies
	Player	Hometown
(Canada)	Krista Cloutier	Pickardville, Alberta
(Canada)	Chantal Cotton	Vancouver, British Columbia
(Canada)	Jennifer Price	Victoria, British Columbia

Defense
	Player	Hometown
(Canada)	Kobi Kawamoto	Surrey, British Columbia
(Canada)	Erin Leslie	Vancouver, British Columbia
(Canada)	Patti Maskall	Richmond, British Columbia
(Canada)	Tamara Pickford	Chilliwack, British Columbia
(Canada)	Kira Sinow	Vancouver, British Columbia
(Canada)	Renae Stevenson	Abbotsford, British Columbia

Forwards
	Player	Hometown
(Canada)	Debbie Beaudoin	Surrey, British Columbia
(Canada)	Michelle McLeary	North Vancouver, British Columbia
(Norway)	Julia Berg	Randaberg, Norway
(Canada)	Natalie Christensen	Abbotsford, British Columbia
(Canada)	Alana Gray	Coquitlam, British Columbia
(Canada)	Danielle Grundy	Kelowna, British Columbia
(Canada)	Caroline Hall	Victoria, British Columbia
(Canada)	Glenda Olson	Abbotsford, British Columbia
(Canada)	Sherri Pitre	North Vancouver, British Columbia
(Canada)	Sherri Schmidt	Lillooet, British Columbia
(Canada)	Sonya Sneyd	Whistler, British Columbia
(Canada)	Kelli Stephens	
(Canada)	Elaine Topolnisky	Logan Lake, British Columbia
(Canada)	Samantha Wong	Vancouver, British Columbia
