= 1994 Abby Hoffman Cup =

Canadian ice hockey championship trophy

Tournament details
- Venue: Max Bell Arena
- Dates: March 17–20, 1994
- Teams: 8

Final positions
- Champions: Équipe Québec (1st title)
- Runners-up: Edmonton Chimos
- Third place: North York Aeros

Tournament statistics
- Games played: 20

Awards
- MVP: Nancy Drolet

The 1994 Abby Hoffman Cup was the 13th staging of Hockey Canada's Esso Women's National Championships. The four-day competition was played in Winnipeg, Manitoba. Hockey Québec's all-star team won the Abby Hoffman Cup for the first time after a 5–2 win over Alberta's Edmonton Chimos. It was the first time that an all-star team won the Abby Hoffman Cup.

In the final game, Québec's Nancy Drolet scored a hat trick.

== Teams participating ==
- Vancouver Bladerunners, British Columbia
- Edmonton Chimos, Alberta
- Saskatoon Stronnfield Agro-Athletics, Saskatchewan
- Team Manitoba
- Winnipeg Sweat Camp Storm, Manitoba
- North York Aeros, Ontario
- Équipe Québec
- Maritime Sports Blades, New Brunswick
