= Vicky Sunohara =

Canadian ice hockey player and coach

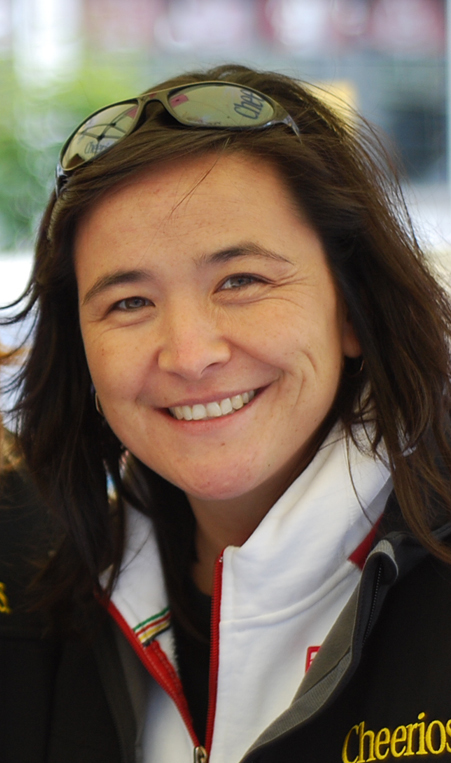
- Born: May 18, 1970 (age 56) Scarborough, Ontario, Canada
- Height: 5 ft 6 in (168 cm)
- Weight: 169 lb (77 kg; 12 st 1 lb)
- Position: Centre
- Shot: Left
- ECAC CIAU CWHL team: Northeastern Huskies; Toronto Lady Blues; Scarborough Firefighters; Toronto Red Wings; Newtonbrook Panthers; Brampton Thunder
- National team: Canada
- Playing career: 1990–2009

Vicky Sunohara (born May 18, 1970) is a Canadian ice hockey coach, former ice hockey player, and three-time Olympic medallist. She has been described as "the Wayne Gretzky of women's hockey" and is recognized as a trailblazer and pioneer for the sport. In 2020, Sunohara was named to "TSN Hockey’s All-Time Women’s Team Canada," in recognition of her status as one of Canada’s best female hockey players of all time. She was inducted into the IIHF Hall of Fame in 2025.

Sunohara is currently the head coach of the Varsity Blues women's ice hockey team of the University of Toronto. She was nationally recognized in 2019–20 and 2021-22 as the U Sports Women's Ice Hockey Coach of the Year and was named the 2019–20 Ontario University Athletics (OUA) Female Coach of the Year across all sports.

== Playing career ==
Sunohara began to play hockey as a small child. Her late father, David Sunohara, was a hockey enthusiast who played college ice hockey with the Ryerson Rams.

Sunohara's father built a backyard rink in the winters and introduced his daughter to skating at the age of two and a half. "My mother said that from the minute my father introduced me to hockey, I wouldn't do anything else," Sunohara commented, "I just loved it."

She began playing organized hockey on a boys team at age 5, but was eventually banned from the boys' leagues due to her gender.

Sunohara attended Stephen Leacock Collegiate Institute in Scarborough, a suburban district of Toronto, where she was a standout on the women's ice hockey, field hockey, soccer, and flag football teams.

Following high school, Sunohara received a full athletic scholarship to Northeastern University in Boston, where she played two seasons with the Northeastern Huskies women's ice hockey program in the ECAC Hockey conference of the NCAA Division I. In her freshman season, she led the Huskies in scoring as they claimed the 1989 ECAC Hockey conference championship title and was recognized as the ECAC Rookie of the Year. In the 1989–90 season, she led the team in scoring again and was named to the NCAA All-American team. Across 45 games with Northeastern, she scored 122 points (78 goals and 44 assists).

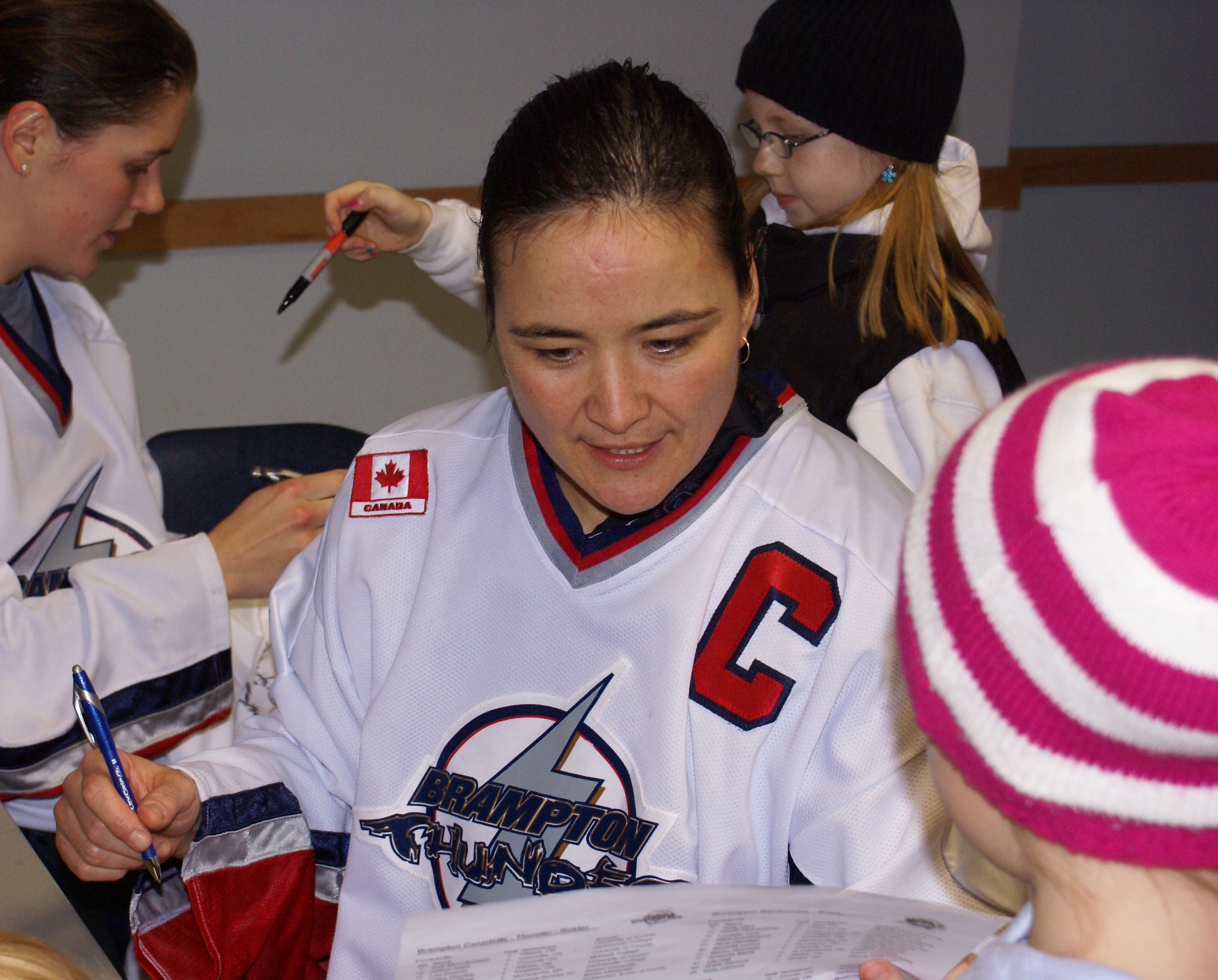
Sunohara signing autographs in 2008

Sunohara also played hockey for the University of Toronto, where her team won the Ontario University Athletics women's ice hockey championships in 1990–91 and 1991–92. She was named the OUA women's ice hockey Rookie of the Year in 1990–91.

Sunohara also played in the Central Ontario Women's Hockey League with the Scarborough Firefighters (1990–1994), Toronto Red Wings (1994–1996), and the Newtonbrook Panthers (1996–97).

In 1995-96, she was a goal-a-game player with the Toronto Red Wings when she scored 28 goals in 25 games. She finished sixth in the scoring race with 44 points. In March 1996, she played at her first National Championships in Moncton when she was picked up on loan by the North York Aeros. The Aeros lost the Canadian Final 3-2 in overtime to Hockey Québec.

In 1996-97, she scored a career-best 42 goals in 29 games with the Newtonbrook Panthers and finished third in the league scoring race with 70 points. In March 1997, she was again picked up on loan by the Aeros to participate at the National Championships. This time, the Aeros finished in third place

She was named the top forward of the tournament in 2005 and her team, the Brampton Thunder, won the national title in 2006.

At Hockey Canada's 2006 National Championships, she helped Brampton capture their first Abby Hoffman Cup after a 2-1 win over the Montréal Axion. Sunohara scored the 2-1 winner late in the second period.

In 2006-07, she captained Brampton to their first NWHL Cup in the playoffs. The Thunder won 4-0 over the Montréal Axion in the playoff final.

== International play ==
Medal record

Representing Canada

Women's ice hockey

Olympic Games
Gold medal – first place	2002 Salt Lake City	Tournament
Gold medal – first place	2006 Turin	Tournament
Silver medal – second place	1998 Nagano	Tournament

World Championship
Gold medal – first place	1990 Canada	
Gold medal – first place	1997 Canada	
Gold medal – first place	1999 Finland	
Gold medal – first place	2000 Canada	
Gold medal – first place	2001 United States	
Gold medal – first place	2004 Canada	
Gold medal – first place	2007 Canada	
Silver medal – second place	2005 Sweden	

Sunohara won an Olympic silver medal at the 1998 Winter Olympics in Nagano, Japan. She continued with an Olympic gold medal at the 2002 Winter Olympics in Salt Lake City, Utah, and another gold medal at the 2006 Winter Olympics in Turin, Italy.

Besides the 1998, 2002 and 2006 Winter Olympics, Sunohara represented Canada in numerous international ice hockey competitions. She won seven gold medals at the International Ice Hockey Federation (IIHF) World Championships, the first one coming in 1990. In total, she won 15 gold medals and 3 silver medals as a member of Canada's national team.

Sunohara excelled for Team Canada in major tournaments. She had 13 points in 16 games during three Olympics, and 41 points in 40 games during eight World Championships. Sunohara finished her career with Team Canada with 119 points (56 goals and 62 assists) in 164 games. As of 2020, she continued to rank in Canada's all-time top ten for games played, goals, and points.

Sunohara was inducted into the IIHF Hall of Fame in 2025.

== Coaching and leadership ==
Sunohara is credited with helping to expand the popularity of women's ice hockey, having trained and mentored many young girls in the sport. Along with instructing at several hockey camps and clinics, she served as an assistant hockey coach at the Canadian women's national under-18 and under-19 team evaluation camps. In 2022, Sunohara was an assistant coach on Canada’s under-18 women’s ice hockey team, which won gold at the world championships. For two years, she was the Director of Women's Hockey at The Hill Academy in Vaughan, Ontario.

In 2011, Sunohara was named head coach of the University of Toronto Varsity Blues women's ice hockey team.

In 2020, Sunohara guided University of Toronto to winning the Ontario University Athletics women’s ice hockey title. U Sports, the governing body of university sport in Canada, named Sunohara the 2019–20 National Women's Ice Hockey Coach of the Year. Ontario University Athletics also named her the 2019–20 Women's Ice Hockey Coach of the Year, in addition to the Female Coach of the Year across all sports. Sunohara repeated as the U Sports Women’s Ice Hockey Coach of the Year in the 2021-22 season.

In 2022, The Hockey News ranked Sunohara as having the strongest qualifications to break the gender barrier and become the first female head coach in the National Hockey League.

Sunohara's has described coaching as "more than just teaching a wrist shot or slap shot." She believes in instilling "Olympic values," like integrity, accountability, commitment and endeavors to mold her team members into better players and better people.

Sunohara has been described as "one of the nicest people in all of hockey," as well as a "focused and intense competitor". During her tenure with Team Canada, Sunohara was counted on for her veteran leadership and was the assistant captain of the Canadian national team from 2001 until her retirement in 2008 at the age of 38.

A former Team Canada teammate, Jennifer Botterill, described Sunohara as "the most positive, supportive, energetic person you'll meet."

About Sunohara, Sami Jo Small, another former Team Canada teammate, said:

I have had the privilege of playing with some pretty amazing people but none have struck me as born leaders like Vicky Sunohara...She rallies the troops in desperate times and tells funny jokes when the pressure is mounting...She's always there for her teammates and always willing to do whatever it takes to win. She makes those around her not only better hockey players but also better people...In the ten years I played on the team I never saw another player touch as many people in such a positive way as Vicky Sunohara.

Sunohara's former Team Canada coach, Melody Davidson, said of Sunohara: "She'll do everything she can for this team. She's just a tremendous person."

In 2009, David Miller, then Mayor of Toronto, remarked:

Not only is Vicky one of Canada's elite female athletes, she is a Torontonian and the granddaughter of immigrants representing the city's diversity which is one of our most important strengths. Vicky is well respected in our community and has worked tirelessly to help the youth of Toronto -- especially young girls -- develop their skills and fulfill their dreams.

== Other awards and accomplishments ==
Sunohara was inducted into the City of Brampton Sports Hall of Fame, alongside national team teammates Jayna Hefford and Sami Jo Small. In 2006, she was named an inaugural member of the Scarborough Walk of Fame.

At the age of 36, Sunohara was named Ontario's Female Athlete of the Year for 2006.

Sunohara has been acknowledged by the Hockey Hall of Fame as one of the most notable women ice hockey players of all time.

In 2009, Sunohara was selected by the Vancouver Olympic Organizing Committee to be Toronto's final torchbearer in the 2010 Winter Olympics torch relay as the Vancouver-bound Olympic flame passed through Ontario on its cross-country journey. She lit the cauldron before thousands of spectators at Nathan Phillips Square.

In 2012, Sunohara was inducted into the Canadian Olympic Hall of Fame with the roster of the 2006 Canadian women's national team that participated in the women's ice hockey tournament of the 2006 Winter Olympics.

In 2018, Sunohara was inducted into the Toronto Sport Hall of Honour in the sport legends category.

In 2018, Sunohara was featured in the Canadian Olympic Committee “Virtue and Victory” campaign, showcasing the stories of athletes who exemplify both Canadian and Olympic values. Sunohara, along with Hayley Wickenheiser and Caroline Ouellette, were recognized for leadership and excellence.

In 2019, Sunohara was appointed Honorary Lieutenant Colonel of The Queen's Own Rifles of Canada, a Primary Reserve regiment of the Canadian Armed Forces, based in Toronto. “I was shocked and humbled,” said HLCol Sunohara. “What came to my mind was ‘not worthy.’ But obviously I have a tremendous amount of respect and gratitude for those who serve our country. To be able to contribute in some small way is quite rewarding.”

According to Regimental Sergeant Major Donovan O’Halloran, Sunohara was a “natural choice” for this appointment, commenting:

Vicky is a leader in our community on several levels. She is a role model for the pursuit of excellence, she has achieved the highest measure of success in her sport and she continues to serve her community through coaching, mentoring and volunteering. It is a great privilege to have a woman of such distinction accept this important role.

In 2020, Sunohara was named to "TSN Hockey’s All-Time Women’s Team Canada" and described as "the ultimate glue player," meaning an egoless leader who put the needs of her team above everything else and held the team together. Sunohara was the epitome of a team player.

In 2020, the Japanese Canadian Cultural Centre named Sunohara a recipient of the Sakura Award, which recognizes exceptional contributions made by individuals to the promotion and exchange of Japanese culture and enhancing awareness of Japanese heritage within Canada and abroad. Sunohara's grandparents grew up in Japan; they moved to Ontario from BC after being released from World War II internment camps in that province.

Sunohara was one of six Canadian women's ice hockey players honoured during the 2021 World Junior Ice Hockey Championship. Hockey Canada described them as "some of the greatest female hockey players Canada has ever produced", with their "legacies as trailblazers for the women's game" well documented.

== Personal life ==
Sunohara was born in Scarborough, Ontario. She is of Japanese and Ukrainian heritage. She is a graduate of the University of Toronto with a Bachelor of Physical and Health Education degree.

Following her retirement from international hockey in 2008, Sunohara and her husband Tal welcomed twin boys in 2009. She coaches her sons' hockey team.

Sunohara makes frequent appearances as a guest speaker and volunteers at charitable and community organizations. Beginning in 2001, she served as a spokesperson for the Youth Assisting Youth program of United Way of Canada. In 2010, Sunohara was appointed to the Board of Directors of the Canadian Sport Centre Ontario (CSCO), a non-profit organization committed to assisting high-performance athletes and coaches achieve excellence in international competition.

== Career statistics ==
=== Regular season and playoffs ===
			Regular season					Playoffs
Season	Team	League	GP	G	A	Pts	PIM	GP	G	A	Pts	PIM
1988-89	Northeastern University	ECAC	25	51	27	78	—	—	—	—	—
1989-1990	Northeastern University	ECAC	20	27	17	44	—	—	—	—	—
1990-91	University of Toronto	CIAU	—	—	—	—	—	—	—	—	—	—
1992-93	Scarborough Firefighters	COWHL	21	12	8	20	16	—	—	—	—	—
1993-94	Scarborough Firefighters	COWHL	—	—	—	—	—	—	—	—	—	—
1994-95	Toronto Red Wings	COWHL	—	—	—	—	—	—	—	—	—	—
1995-96	Toronto Red Wings	COWHL	25	28	16	44	30	—	—	—	—	—
1996-97	Newtonbrook Panthers	COWHL	29	42	28	70	12	—	—	—	—	—
1998-99	Brampton Thunder	NWHL	24	22	18	40	18	—	—	—	—	—
1999-00	Brampton Thunder	NWHL	31	18	34	52	18	—	—	—	—	—
2000-01	Brampton Thunder	NWHL	30	19	31	50	30	4	2	3	5	6
2001-02	Brampton Thunder	NWHL	0	0	0	0	0	4	1	6	7	0
2002-03	Brampton Thunder	NWHL	30	20	27	47	24	—	—	—	—	—
2003-04	Brampton Thunder	NWHL	34	19	28	47	18	5	3	3	6	2
2004-05	Brampton Thunder	NWHL	31	28	28	56	33	—	—	—	—	—
2005-06	Brampton Thunder	NWHL	2	0	3	3	0	5	5	2	7	2
2006-07	Brampton Thunder	NWHL	—	—	—	—	—	—	—	—	—	—
2007-08	Brampton Thunder	NWHL	28	13	25	38	22	—	—	—	—	—
2008-09	Brampton Thunder	NWHL	21	5	14	19	22	—	—	—	—	—

=== International ===
Year	Team	Event	Result	GP	G	A	Pts	PIM
1990	Canada	WC	1st place, gold medalist(s)	5	6	3	9	2
1997	Canada	WC	1st place, gold medalist(s)	5	4	1	5	2
1998	Canada	OG	2nd place, silver medalist(s)	6	1	3	4	0
1999	Canada	WC	1st place, gold medalist(s)	5	2	3	5	2
2000	Canada	WC	1st place, gold medalist(s)	5	1	2	3	4
2001	Canada	WC	1st place, gold medalist(s)	5	2	5	7	2
2002	Canada	OG	1st place, gold medalist(s)	5	4	2	6	6
2004	Canada	WC	1st place, gold medalist(s)	5	2	0	2	0
2005	Canada	WC	2nd place, silver medalist(s)	5	2	3	5	6
2006	Canada	OG	1st place, gold medalist(s)	5	1	2	3	2
2007	Canada	WC	1st place, gold medalist(s)	5	0	5	5	2
