= 1990 Abby Hoffman Cup =

Canadian ice hockey championship trophy

Tournament details
- Venue: Lloydminster Civic Centre
- Dates: March 29 to April 1, 1990
- Teams: 8

Final positions
- Champions: Sherbrooke Christin Autos (3rd title)
- Runners-up: Edmonton Chimos
- Third place: North York Beatrice Aeros

Tournament statistics
- Games played: 20

Awards
- MVP: France St-Louis (Sherbrooke)

The 1990 Abby Hoffman Cup was the ninth staging of Hockey Canada's Women's National Championships. The four-day competition was played in Lloydminster, Saskatchewan. Sherbrooke Christin Autos won the Abby Hoffman Cup for the third year in a row after a 5–1 win over Alberta's Edmonton Chimos.

The final game took place just one week after the first official IIHF Women's World Championships.

== Teams participating ==
- British Columbia
- Edmonton Chimos, Alberta (Host)
- Saskatoon Saskies
- Saskatchewan 2
- Manitoba
- North York Beatrice Aeros, Ontario
- Sherbrooke Christin Autos, Québec
- Moncton Right Spot, New Brunswick
