= Samantha Holmes-Domagala =

Canadian ice hockey player

- Born: June 23, 1977 (age 48) Mississauga, Ontario, Canada
- Height: 5 ft 8 in (173 cm)
- Weight: 155 lb (70 kg; 11 st 1 lb)
- Position: Forward
- ECAC NWHL WWHL team: New Hampshire Wildcats; Brampton Thunder; Strathmore Rockies
- National team: Canada
- Playing career: 2000–2010

Samantha Holmes-Domagala
Medal record

Representing Canada

Women's ice hockey

Four Nations Cup
Gold medal – first place	2000 United States	Tournament
Gold medal – first place	2004 United States	Tournament

Samantha Holmes (born June 23, 1977) played for the Canadian national women's ice hockey team from 2000 to 2005. She is also the founder of the Strathmore Rockies ice hockey team.

== Early life ==
As a child, Samantha Holmes-Domagala attended the 1988 Winter Olympics in Calgary, Alberta. Upon her arrival, she was disappointed to learn that there would not be a women's hockey tournament. After the games, she became involved in activism, beginning a letter writing campaign to get women involved in ice hockey. She wrote to her local newspaper, Mississauga mayor Hazel McCallion, Canadian Prime Minister Brian Mulroney, and IOC President Juan Antonio Samaranch.

== Playing career ==
As a member of the Team Ontario contingent for the 1995 Canada Winter Games, her teammates included Jayna Hefford and Sommer West. Holmes played NCAA hockey for the university of New Hampshire Wildcats women's ice hockey program. On January 19, 2000, the Wildcats played an exhibition game against the United States national women's team. Although the Wildcats lost 8–2, Holmes scored both goals for the Wildcats. During the 2000-01 NWHL season, she competed for the Brampton Thunder.

She moved to Calgary in June 2002 and played hockey for the Calgary Oval X-Treme. She competed in two international tournaments for her country, but never participated in the Olympics. Holmes played for the X-Treme when they competed in the 2003 Esso Women's National Hockey Championship (held on March 16, 2003). Holmes scored two goals to secure a 6–3 win for the X-Treme and the Abby Hoffman Cup.

After she left the Oval X-Treme, she formed her own team. Her team was the Strathmore Rockies and they joined the Western Women's Hockey League. The idea stemmed from the fact that there were many elite hockey players in Calgary, but not all of them had the opportunity to play for the Oval X-Treme. Holmes also handled the day-to-day tasks of running the Strathmore team. Part of her accomplishments included player scouting, sponsorship and marketing campaigns to operate the team. She is also captain of the Rockies and a graduate of the University of New Hampshire.

== Retirement ==
Holmes runs local skills clinics in Calgary for young women's players. In April 2011, Holmes joined the sponsorship division of the CWHL and manage the Alberta expansion team for the 2011-12 CWHL season. In July 2012, she gave birth to a daughter.

== Career stats ==
=== Hockey Canada ===
Event	Games	Goals	Assists	Points	PIM
2000 Four Nations Cup	4	0	2	2	12
2004 Four Nations Cup	4	0	0	0	10
2004 National Women's Festival	2	3	0	3	2

=== CWHL ===
Year	Team	Games played	Goals	Assists	Points	Penalty Minutes
2007-08	Strathmore Rockies	22	5	4	9	16
2008-09	Strathmore Rockies	19	3	3	6	30
2009-10	Strathmore Rockies	13	5	3	8	16

== Awards and honours ==
- 1999-2000 New England Hockey Writers Association Women's Division I All-Star Team selection
