= 1989 Abby Hoffman Cup =

Canadian ice hockey championship trophy

Tournament details
- Venue: Coquitlam Sports Complex
- Dates: March 16–19, 1989
- Teams: 8

Final positions
- Champions: Sherbrooke Christin Autos (2nd title)
- Runners-up: North York Aeros
- Third place: Edmonton Chimos

Tournament statistics
- Games played: 20

Awards
- MVP: Tammy Bezaire (Sherbrooke)

The 1989 Abby Hoffman Cup was the eighth staging of Hockey Canada's Women's National Championships. The four-day competition was played in Coquitlam, British Columbia. Sherbrooke Christin Autos won the Abby Hoffman Cup for the second year in a row after a 4–3 win over the Toronto Aeros.

In the final game, Nathalie Picard scored two goals in the victory, including the winner in the third period.

== Teams participating ==
- Surrey Flyers, British Columbia
- Edmonton Chimos, Alberta (Host)
- Saskatchewan Saskies
- Manitoba
- North York Aeros, Ontario
- Sherbrooke Christin Autos, Québec
- Moncton Jaguars, New Brunswick
- Prince Edward Island
