= 1995 Abby Hoffman Cup =

Canadian ice hockey championship trophy

Tournament details
- Venue: Cahill Stadium
- Dates: March 23–26, 1995
- Teams: 9

Final positions
- Champions: Équipe Québec (2nd title)
- Runners-up: Maritime Sports Blades
- Third place: Calgary Classics

Tournament statistics
- Games played: 24

Awards
- MVP: Stacy Wilson (Maritime Sports Blades)

The 1995 Abby Hoffman Cup was the 14th staging of Hockey Canada's Esso Women's National Championships. The four-day competition was played in Summerside, Prince Edward Island. Hockey Québec's all-star team won the Abby Hoffman Cup for the second year in a row after a 5–2 win over New Brunswick's Maritime Sports Blades.

In the final game, Québec's Martine Bérubé scored the winner in the second period.

== Teams participating ==
- Britannia Blues, British Columbia
- Calgary Classics, Alberta
- Regina Sharks, Saskatchewan
- Winnipeg Sweat Camp Storm, Manitoba
- Mississauga Chiefs, Ontario
- Équipe Québec
- Maritime Sports Blades, New Brunswick
- PEI Esso Tigers, Prince Edward Island
- Metro Valley Selects, Nova Scotia
