= 1996 Abby Hoffman Cup =

Canadian ice hockey championship trophy

Tournament details
- Venue: Moncton Coliseum
- Dates: March 21–24, 1996
- Teams: 9

Final positions
- Champions: Équipe Québec (3rd title)
- Runners-up: North York Beatrice Aeros
- Third place: Maritime Sports Blades

Tournament statistics
- Games played: 24

Awards
- MVP: Hayley Wickenheiser (Edmonton)

The 1996 Abby Hoffman Cup was the 15th staging of Hockey Canada's Esso Women's National Championships. The four-day competition was played in Moncton, New Brunswick. Hockey Québec's all-star team won the Abby Hoffman Cup for the third-straight year after a 3–2 win over Ontario's North York Aeros.

Down 2–0 in the final game, Québec's Danielle Goyette scored three times including the overtime winner. Goyette was named the tournament's best forward.

== Teams participating ==
- Britannia Blues, British Columbia
- Edmonton Chimos, Alberta
- Team Saskatchewan
- Winnipeg Sweat Camp Storm, Manitoba
- North York Aeros, Ontario
- Équipe Québec
- Maritime Sports Blades, New Brunswick
- PEI Esso Tigers, Prince Edward Island
- Pictou County Sobey's, Nova Scotia
