= 2001 Abby Hoffman Cup =

Canadian ice hockey championship trophy

Tournament details
- Venue: Cahill Stadium
- Dates: March 7–11, 2001
- Teams: 10

Final positions
- Champions: Calgary Oval X-Treme (2nd title)
- Runners-up: Équipe Québec
- Third place: North York Beatrice Aeros

Tournament statistics
- Games played: 29

Awards
- MVP: Caroline Ouellette (Québec)

The 2001 Abby Hoffman Cup was the 20th staging of Hockey Canada's Esso Women's National Championships. The five-day competition was played in Summerside, Prince Edward Island. The Calgary Oval X-Treme won the Abby Hoffman Cup for the second time, this time with a 1–0 win over Hockey Québec's all-stars.

In the final game, Dana Pretty scored the only goal.

== Teams participating ==
- Vancouver Griffins, British Columbia
- Calgary Oval X-Treme, Alberta
- Team Saskatchewan
- University of Manitoba, Manitoba
- North York Beatrice Aeros, Ontario
- Équipe Québec
- Team New Brunswick
- PEI Humpty Dumpty Crunch, Prince Edward Island
- Team Nova Scotia
- Team Newfoundland & Labrador

== Final round ==
=== Gold medal game ===
March 11, 2001; 20:00	(gold) Calgary	1-0	Québec (silver)	Cahill Stadium

Game reference
Robyn Rittmaster	Goalies	Kim St-Pierre
Dana Pretty / Goals
36	Shots	23
