= Kim St-Pierre =

Canadian ice hockey player (born 1978)

- Hockey Hall of Fame, 2020
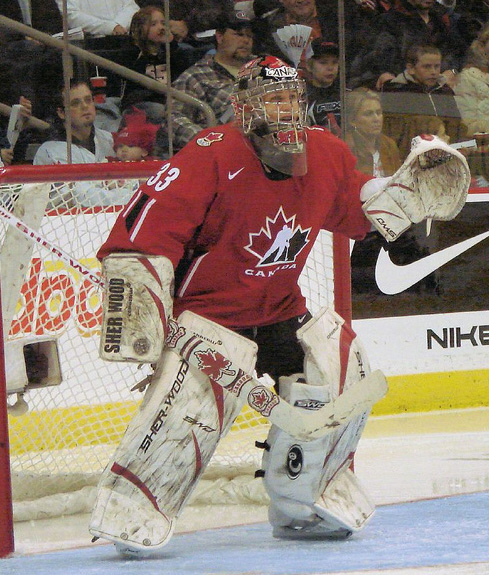
- St-Pierre with Canada in 2007
- Born: December 14, 1978 (age 47) Châteauguay, Quebec, Canada
- Height: 5 ft 9 in (175 cm)
- Weight: 155 lb (70 kg; 11 st 1 lb)
- Position: Goaltender
- Caught: Left
- Played for: McGill Martlets; Montreal Stars
- National team: Canada
- Playing career: 1998–2013
- Website: www.kimstpierre.com
Medal record
Representing Canada
Women's ice hockey
Olympic Games
Gold medal – first place	2002 Salt Lake City	Tournament
Gold medal – first place	2006 Torino	Tournament
Gold medal – first place	2010 Vancouver	Tournament
IIHF World Women's Championships
Gold medal – first place	1999 Finland	Tournament
Gold medal – first place	2000 Canada	Tournament
Gold medal – first place	2001 United States	Tournament
Gold medal – first place	2004 Canada	Tournament
Gold medal – first place	2007 Canada	Tournament
Silver medal – second place	2005 Sweden	Tournament
Silver medal – second place	2008 China	Tournament
Silver medal – second place	2009 Finland	Tournament
Silver medal – second place	2011 Switzerland	Tournament
Women's 4 Nations Cup
Gold medal – first place	2010 Canada	Tournament

Kim St-Pierre (born December 14, 1978) is a Canadian former ice hockey goaltender. She is a three-time Olympic gold medallist and five-time IIHF world champion. She was announced as a Hockey Hall of Fame inductee on June 24, 2020. She was named to the Order of Hockey in Canada in 2022.

== Playing career ==
=== University ===
In 1998-99, she was the top rookie for the McGill Martlets women's ice hockey team. She was also the first woman in Canadian Interuniversity Sports history to win a men’s regular season game when McGill University defeated Ryerson University on November 15, 2003, by a score of 5–2.

In 2002, St-Pierre was picked by Hockey Québec for the National Championships and she led the all-stars to their fifth Abby Hoffman Cup. She posted four shutouts in four games and was named the tournament's Most Valuable Player.

=== NWHL and CWHL ===
St-Pierre formerly played for the Montreal Stars of the Canadian Women's Hockey League. In 2007-08, she was voted the CWHL Top Goaltender and a CWHL Eastern All-Star. By winning the 2009 Clarkson Cup, St. Pierre won the top three trophies in women's ice hockey, becoming the third woman to win the Clarkson Cup, an Olympic gold medal (in 2002, 2006, and 2010), and a gold medal at the IIHF women's world hockey championships.

St. Pierre did not play the 2011–12 Canada women's national ice hockey team season (along with the Stars season) to have a baby.

=== Montreal Canadiens practice ===
St. Pierre made women's ice hockey history on October 23, 2008, when she tended goal during a practice session with the Montreal Canadiens at Denis Savard Arena. Carey Price was out with the flu. She was the second woman in NHL history to play alongside NHL players, since Manon Rhéaume in an exhibition game. As she wore her usual #33 jersey, Alexei Kovalev put a wrist shot past her ear and Francis Bouillon blasted a slapshot that just missed her mask and deflected off the crossbar. St.Pierre referred to the experience as "priceless".

=== International play ===
Kim St. Pierre was the goaltender for Team Canada in the 2002 Salt Lake City Olympics, and was the starting goaltender in Team Canada's 3-2 victory over Team USA in the gold medal final. She also played for the Canadian women's team in Turin. St. Pierre holds numerous records in international competition, including most shutouts (15), most wins (24), and lowest goals against average (0.84). She received a gold medal in the Women's Hockey game at the 2010 Vancouver Winter Olympics. St. Pierre retired from international play in April 2013.

== Career statistics ==
Year	Team	Event	Result	GP	W	L	T/OT	MIN	GA	SO	GAA	SV%
2002	Canada	OG	1st place, gold medalist(s)	4	4	0	0	240:00	5	2	1.25	0.936
2006	Canada	OG	1st place, gold medalist(s)	2	2	0	0	120:00	1	1	0.50	0.923
2010	Canada	OG	1st place, gold medalist(s)	2	2	0	0	100:00	0	1	0.00	1.000

== Awards and honours ==
- CWHL Top Goaltender, 2007–08 and 2008–09
- CWHL First All-Star Team, 2008–09
- CWHL Eastern All-Stars, 2007–08
- CIAU Championship game Most Valuable Player in 2000
- CIS Most Outstanding Player in 2003
- Most Valuable Player, 2002 Esso Women's Nationals
- Top Goaltender at the 2001 World Championships
- Top Goaltender at the 2004 World Championships
- Top Goaltender at the 2002 Winter Olympics
- Top Goaltender at the 2002 Esso Canadian National Championship
- Named to the Order of Hockey in Canada in 2022.
