= Calgary Oval X-Treme =

Calgary Oval Xtreme
- City: Calgary, Alberta
- League: Western Women's Hockey League
- Founded: 1995
- Folded: 2009
- Home arena: Olympic Oval
- Colours: Blue and White

The Calgary Oval X-Treme were a professional women's ice hockey team in the Western Women's Hockey League (WWHL). The team played its home games at the Olympic Oval in Calgary, Alberta, Canada. The Oval X-Treme were a member of the National Women's Hockey League for two seasons before breaking away to help form the WWHL in 2004.

== History ==
The Oval X-Treme were founded in 1995 as an amateur team for women's hockey players in Calgary, quickly developing a heated rivalry with their northern counterparts, the Edmonton Chimos. In 2002, the Oval X-Treme were approached, along with the Chimos, to join the National Women's Hockey League (NWHL). The two teams joined the Vancouver Griffins to form the West division of the NWHL. After the 03-04 season, where the Oval X-Treme and Chimos faced only each other due to prohibitive costs to fly out east, the two franchises left the NWHL to form the five team Western Women's Hockey League. In 2006, the two leagues were reunited under the NWHL banner. However, this was short lived as the NWHL and WWHL could not reach an agreement upon a playoff schedule. As a result, the merger was not consummated. With the collapse of the NWHL in the summer of 2007, the Western Women's Hockey League was once again a completely independent league.

The Calgary Oval X-Treme suspended activities for the 2009-10 season.

Partially as a result of the Canada national team being based in Calgary, the Oval X-Treme featured many of Canada's top women's hockey players, including Hayley Wickenheiser, Danielle Goyette and Cassie Campbell. As a result, the Oval X-Treme became the undisputed powerhouse of women's hockey in western Canada, winning five consecutive league championships, and compiling a regular season mark of 95-3-2-1 in their last five seasons.

Gina Kingsbury joined the Oval X-Treme in 2006. She had 31 points (11 goals, 20 assists) in 19 games as the Oval X-Treme went on to win the Esso Women's National Championship. In her second season with the Oval X-Treme, Kingsbury scored 20 goals and added 25 assists in 23 games.

== Season-by-season ==
in National Women's Hockey League (NWHL):

- See also: 2002–03 NWHL season
- See also: 2003–04 NWHL season

in Western Women's Hockey League (WWHL):

- See also: 2004–05 WWHL season
- See also: 2005–06 WWHL season
- See also: 2006–07 WWHL season
- See also: 2007–08 WWHL season
- See also: 2008–09 WWHL season

Year by year
Year	GP	W	L	T	GF	GA	Pts
2002–03	24	23	1	0	83	81	39
2003–04	12	11	1	0	64	9	22
2004–05	21	20	0	1	152	18	51
2005–06	24	22	0	2	126	43	46
2006–07	24	23	0	1	172	24	46
2007–08	24	24	0	0	162	27	48
2008–09	23	20	2	1	143	34	42

Note: GP = Games played, W = Wins, L = Losses, T = Ties, GF = Goals for, GA = Goals against, Pts = Points.

== Season standings ==
= Indicates First Place finish

= Indicates championship

Year	League	Reg. season	Playoffs
2002-03	National Women's Hockey League	first place in Western Division	NWHL Champions
2003-04	National Women's Hockey League	first place in Western Division	NWHL Champions
2004-05	Western Women's Hockey League	first place	WWHL Champions cup
2005-06	Western Women's Hockey League	first place	WWHL Champions cup
2006-07	Western Women's Hockey League	first place	WWHL Champions cup
2007-08	Western Women's Hockey League	first place	WWHL Champions cup
2008-09	Western Women's Hockey League	First place	defeat in final

== Last roster 2008–09 ==
Goalies
Number		Player	Former Team	Hometown
33	(United States)	Kendall Newell		Phoenix, Arizona
1	(Canada)	Amanda Tapp	Calgary Oval X-Treme	Calgary, Alberta

Defense
Number		Player	Former Team	Hometown
34	(Canada)	Delaney Collins	Canada National Team	Pilot Mound, Manitoba
20	(Canada)	Tessa Bonhomme	Canada National Team	Sudbury, Ontario
18	(Canada)	Gillian Ferrari	Toronto Aeros from 1996–2004 and Brampton Thunder from 2004–2006.	Thornhill, Ontario
8	(Canada)	Carla Macleod	Canada National Team	Calgary, Alberta
5	(Canada)	Colleen Sostorics - Captain	Canada National Team	Kennedy, Saskatchewan

Forwards
Number		Player	Former Team	Hometown
41	(Canada)	Erica Ferrer		
29	(Canada)	Bryanne Panchuck		
28	(Canada)	Karen McLaughlin	Calgary Oval X-Treme	Listowel, Ontario
27	(Canada)	Gina Kingsbury	Canada National Team	Rouyn-Noranda, Quebec
14	(Canada)	Jocelyn Zabrick		
12	(Switzerland)	Angela Frautschi	Switzerland National Team	Saanenland, Switzerland,
11	(Canada)	Rebecca Russell	U-22 Canada National Team (2004-2005)	Lethbridge, Newfoundland
10	(Canada)	Carrie Olsen		Calgary, Alberta
9	(Canada)	Cherie Piper	Canada National Team	Scarborough, Ontario
7	(Canada)	Kaley Hall	U-22 Canada Team	Calgary, Alberta
6	(Canada)	Katy Josephs		
4	(Canada)	Jennifer Jonsson		Oakview, Manitoba
3	(Switzerland)	Anja Stiefel	Switzerland National Team	Wil, Switzerland,

and

== Coaching staff 2008–09 ==
- General Manager: Kathy Berg
- Head Coach: Bjorn Kinding
- Assistant Coach: Bart Doan

== Honours ==
- The Abby Hoffman Cup (Canadian champions): 1997-98, 2000-01, 2002-03, 2006-07
- NWHL Cup (playoff champion): 2003-04
- NWHL Western Division (regular season): 2002-03, 2003-04
- WWHL Cup (playoff champions): 2004-05, 2005-06, 2006-07
- WWHL regular season: 2004-05, 2005-06, 2006-07, 2007-08, 2008-09

== Notable players ==
- Dana Antal
- Kelly Bechard
- Tessa Bonhomme
- Cassie Campbell
- Delaney Collins
- Danielle Goyette
- Kaley Hall
- Samantha Holmes
- Gina Kingsbury
- Kim McCullough
- Carla MacLeod
- Cherie Piper
- Colleen Sostorics
- Hayley Wickenheiser

== See also ==
- Western Women's Hockey League (WWHL)
- List of ice hockey teams in Alberta
- Ice hockey in Calgary
