= List of Canadian women's national ice hockey team rosters =

The following is a list of the women's national ice hockey players for Canada in various international competitions.

== Winter Olympics ==
=== 2026 Winter Olympics ===
- Head coach: (Nova Scotia) Troy Ryan
- Assistant coach: (Nova Scotia) Kori Cheverie
- Assistant coach: (Quebec) Caroline Ouellette
- Assistant coach: (Ontario) Britni Smith

Goaltenders

- (Quebec) Ann-Renée Desbiens
- (Alberta) Emerance Maschmeyer
- (Ontario) Kayle Osborne

Skaters

Defence

- (Ontario) Erin Ambrose
- (Ontario) Renata Fast – A
- (Ontario) Sophie Jaques
- (Manitoba) Jocelyne Larocque
- (Ontario) Ella Shelton
- (Manitoba) Kati Tabin
- (Ontario) Claire Thompson

Forwards

- (Saskatchewan) Emily Clark
- (Ontario) Sarah Fillier
- (British Columbia) Jenn Gardiner
- (Ontario) Julia Gosling
- (Ontario) Brianne Jenner
- (Ontario) Emma Maltais
- (Ontario) Sarah Nurse
- (Ontario) Kristin O'Neill
- (Quebec) Marie-Philip Poulin – C
- (Ontario) Natalie Spooner
- (Ontario) Laura Stacey
- (Nova Scotia) Blayre Turnbull – A
- (Ontario) Daryl Watts

=== 2022 Winter Olympics ===
- Head coach: (Nova Scotia) Troy Ryan
- Assistant coach: (Nova Scotia) Kori Cheverie
- Assistant coach: (Ontario) Doug Derraugh
- Assistant coach: (Ontario) Alison Domenico

Goaltenders

- (Manitoba) Kristen Campbell
- (Quebec) Ann-Renée Desbiens
- (Alberta) Emerance Maschmeyer

Skaters

Defence

- (Ontario) Erin Ambrose
- (Manitoba) Ashton Bell
- (Ontario) Renata Fast – A
- (Manitoba) Jocelyne Larocque
- (Ontario) Ella Shelton
- (Ontario) Claire Thompson
- (British Columbia) Micah Zandee-Hart

Forwards

- (Saskatchewan) Emily Clark
- (Quebec) Mélodie Daoust
- (Ontario) Sarah Fillier
- (Ontario) Brianne Jenner
- (Ontario) Rebecca Johnston
- (Ontario) Emma Maltais
- (Ontario) Sarah Nurse
- (Quebec) Marie-Philip Poulin – C
- (Ontario) Jamie Lee Rattray
- (Nova Scotia) Jill Saulnier
- (Ontario) Natalie Spooner
- (Ontario) Laura Stacey
- (Nova Scotia) Blayre Turnbull – A

=== 2018 Winter Olympics ===
Head coach: Laura Schuler

Goaltenders

- Shannon Szabados
- Geneviève Lacasse
- Ann-Renée Desbiens

Skaters

Defence

- Renata Fast
- Laura Fortino
- Brigette Lacquette
- Jocelyne Larocque – A
- Lauriane Rougeau
- Meaghan Mikkelson

Forwards

- Meghan Agosta – A
- Bailey Bram
- Emily Clark
- Mélodie Daoust
- Haley Irwin
- Brianne Jenner – A
- Rebecca Johnston
- Sarah Nurse
- Marie-Philip Poulin – C
- Jillian Saulnier
- Natalie Spooner
- Laura Stacey
- Blayre Turnbull
- Jennifer Wakefield

=== 2014 Winter Olympics ===
Head coach: Kevin Dineen

Goaltenders

- Shannon Szabados
- Geneviève Lacasse
- Charline Labonté

Skaters

Defence

- Jocelyne Larocque
- Lauriane Rougeau
- Laura Fortino
- Meaghan Mikkelson
- Catherine Ward
- Tara Watchorn

Forwards

- Meghan Agosta
- Rebecca Johnston
- Jennifer Wakefield
- Gillian Apps
- Caroline Ouellette – C
- Mélodie Daoust
- Jayna Hefford – A
- Brianne Jenner
- Haley Irwin
- Hayley Wickenheiser – A
- Natalie Spooner
- Marie-Philip Poulin

=== 2010 Winter Olympics ===
Head coach: Melody Davidson

Goaltenders

- Charline Labonté
- Kim St-Pierre
- Shannon Szabados

Skaters Defence

- Tessa Bonhomme
- Carla MacLeod
- Becky Kellar
- Colleen Sostorics
- Meaghan Mikkelson
- Catherine Ward

Forwards

- Meghan Agosta
- Gillian Apps
- Jennifer Botterill
- Jayna Hefford – A
- Haley Irwin
- Rebecca Johnston
- Gina Kingsbury
- Caroline Ouellette – A
- Cherie Piper
- Marie-Philip Poulin
- Sarah Vaillancourt
- Hayley Wickenheiser – C

=== 2006 Winter Olympics ===
Head coach: Melody Davidson

Goaltenders

- Charline Labonté
- Kim St-Pierre
- Sami Jo Small

Skaters

- Meghan Agosta
- Gillian Apps
- Jennifer Botterill
- Cassie Campbell
- Gillian Ferrari
- Danielle Goyette
- Jayna Hefford
- Becky Kellar
- Gina Kingsbury
- Carla MacLeod
- Caroline Ouellette
- Cherie Piper
- Cheryl Pounder
- Colleen Sostorics
- Vicky Sunohara
- Sarah Vaillancourt
- Katie Weatherston
- Hayley Wickenheiser

=== 2002 Winter Olympics ===
Head coach: Danièle Sauvageau

Goaltenders

- Charline Labonté
- Sami Jo Small
- Kim St-Pierre

Defence

- Thérèse Brisson
- Isabelle Chartrand
- Geraldine Heaney
- Becky Kellar
- Cheryl Pounder
- Colleen Sostorics

Forwards

- Dana Antal
- Kelly Bechard
- Jennifer Botterill
- Cassie Campbell
- Lori Dupuis
- Danielle Goyette
- Jayna Hefford
- Caroline Ouellette
- Cherie Piper
- Tammy Lee Shewchuk
- Vicky Sunohara
- Hayley Wickenheiser

=== 1998 Winter Olympics ===
Head coach: Shannon Miller

Goaltenders

- Lesley Reddon
- Manon Rhéaume

Defence

- Thérèse Brisson
- Cassie Campbell
- Judy Diduck
- Geraldine Heaney
- Becky Kellar
- Fiona Smith

Forwards

- Jennifer Botterill
- Nancy Drolet
- Lori Dupuis
- Danielle Goyette
- Jayna Hefford
- Kathy McCormack
- Karen Nystrom
- Laura Schuler
- France Saint-Louis
- Vicky Sunohara
- Hayley Wickenheiser
- Stacy Wilson

== IIHF World Women's Championships ==
=== 2026 IIHF Women's World Championship ===
- Head coach: (Nova Scotia) Kori Cheverie
- Assistant coach: (Ontario) Alison Domenico
- Assistant coach: (Quebec) Caroline Ouellette
- Assistant coach: (Ontario) Kris Sparre
- Goaltending coach: Bruno-Pierre Guillemette

Goaltenders

- (Quebec) Ann-Renée Desbiens – Montreal Victoire
- (Ontario) Kayle Osborne – Hamilton Havoc
- (Quebec) Ève Gascon – Minnesota Duluth Bulldogs

Skaters

Defence

- (Ontario) Erin Ambrose – Vegas Vanguards
- (Ontario) Kendall Cooper – Vegas Vanguards
- (Ontario) Renata Fast (C) – Toronto Sceptres
- (Ontario) Nicole Gosling – Hamilton Havoc
- (Ontario) Sophie Jacques – Vancouver Goldeneyes
- (British Columbia) Chloe Primerano – Minnesota Golden Gophers
- (Ontario) Ella Shelton – Toronto Sceptres
- (Manitoba) Kati Tabin – Montreal Victoire

Forwards

- (Saskatchewan) Emily Clark – Hamilton Havoc
- (Ontario) Sarah Fillier – New York Sirens
- (Ontario) Jessie Eldridge – Montreal Victoire
- (Ontario) Caitlin Kraemer – Minnesota Duluth Bulldogs
- (Ontario) Rebecca Leslie – Ottawa Charge
- (Ontario) Emma Maltais – Montreal Victoire
- (Manitoba) Sara Manness – Clarkson Golden Knights
- (Manitoba) Hayley McDonald – Ohio State Buckeyes
- (Ontario) Kristin O'Neill (A) – San Jose Sea Lions
- (Alberta) Danielle Serdachny – Seattle Torrent
- (Ontario) Natalie Spooner – Toronto Sceptres
- (Ontario) Laura Stacey (C) – Montreal Victoire
- (Quebec) Rosalie Tremblay – Wisconsin Badgers
- (Ontario) Daryl Watts – Detroit Clutch
- (Alberta) Sarah Wozniewicz – Ottawa Charge

=== 2025 IIHF Women's World Championship ===
- Head coach: (Nova Scotia) Troy Ryan
- Assistant coach: (Nova Scotia) Kori Cheverie
- Assistant coach: (Alberta) Brad Kirkwood
- Assistant coach: (Quebec) Caroline Ouellette
- Assistant coach: (Ontario) Britni Smith

Goaltenders

- (Manitoba) Kristen Campbell – Toronto Sceptres
- (Quebec) Ann-Renée Desbiens – Montreal Victoire
- (Quebec) Ève Gascon – Minnesota Duluth Bulldogs

Skaters

Defence

- (Ontario) Erin Ambrose – Montreal Victoire
- (Ontario) Renata Fast (A) – Toronto Sceptres
- (Ontario) Sophie Jacques – Minnesota Frost
- (Manitoba) Jocelyne Larocque – Ottawa Charge
- (British Columbia) Chloe Primerano – Minnesota Golden Gophers
- (Ontario) Ella Shelton – New York Sirens
- (Ontario) Claire Thompson – Minnesota Frost
- (British Columbia) Micah Zandee-Hart – New York Sirens

Forwards

- (Saskatchewan) Emily Clark – Ottawa Charge
- (Ontario) Sarah Fillier – New York Sirens
- (British Columbia) Jenn Gardiner – Montreal Victoire
- (Ontario) Julia Gosling – Toronto Sceptres
- (Ontario) Brianne Jenner (A) – Ottawa Charge
- (Ontario) Emma Maltais – Toronto Sceptres
- (Ontario) Sarah Nurse – Toronto Sceptres
- (Ontario) Kristin O'Neill – Montreal Victoire
- (Quebec) Marie-Philip Poulin (C) – Montreal Victoire
- (Alberta) Danielle Serdachny – Ottawa Charge
- (Ontario) Natalie Spooner – Toronto Sceptres
- (Ontario) Laura Stacey – Montreal Victoire
- (Nova Scotia) Blayre Turnbull – Toronto Sceptres
- (Ontario) Daryl Watts – Toronto Sceptres

=== 2024 IIHF Women's World Championship ===
- Head coach: (Nova Scotia) Troy Ryan
- Assistant coach: (Nova Scotia) Kori Cheverie
- Assistant coach: (Ontario) Courtney Kessel
- Assistant coach: (Quebec) Caroline Ouellette

Goaltenders

- (Manitoba) Kristen Campbell – PWHL Toronto
- (Quebec) Ann-Renée Desbiens – PWHL Montreal
- (Alberta) Emerance Maschmeyer – PWHL Ottawa

Skaters

Defence

- (Ontario) Erin Ambrose – PWHL Montreal
- (Manitoba) Ashton Bell – PWHL Ottawa
- (Ontario) Jaime Bourbonnais – PWHL New York
- (Ontario) Renata Fast (A) – PWHL Toronto
- (Ontario) Nicole Gosling – Clarkson Golden Knights
- (Manitoba) Jocelyne Larocque – PWHL Toronto
- (Ontario) Ella Shelton – PWHL New York

Forwards

- (Saskatchewan) Emily Clark – PWHL Ottawa
- (Ontario) Sarah Fillier – Princeton Tigers
- (Ontario) Julia Gosling – St. Lawrence Saints
- (Ontario) Brianne Jenner – PWHL Ottawa
- (Ontario) Emma Maltais – PWHL Toronto
- (Ontario) Sarah Nurse – PWHL Toronto
- (Ontario) Kristin O'Neill – PWHL Montreal
- (Quebec) Marie-Philip Poulin (C) – PWHL Montreal
- (Ontario) Jamie Lee Rattray – PWHL Boston
- (Alberta) Danielle Serdachny – Colgate Raiders
- (Ontario) Natalie Spooner – PWHL Toronto
- (Ontario) Laura Stacey – PWHL Montreal
- (Nova Scotia) Blayre Turnbull (A) – PWHL Toronto

=== 2023 IIHF Women's World Championship ===
- Head coach: (Nova Scotia) Troy Ryan
- Assistant coach: (Nova Scotia) Kori Cheverie
- Assistant coach: (Ontario) Doug Derraugh
- Assistant coach: (Quebec) Caroline Ouellette

Goaltenders

- (Manitoba) Kristen Campbell
- (Quebec) Ann-Renée Desbiens
- (Alberta) Emerance Maschmeyer

Skaters

Defence

- (Ontario) Erin Ambrose
- (Ontario) Jaime Bourbonnais
- (Ontario) Renata Fast – A
- (Manitoba) Jocelyne Larocque
- (Ontario) Ella Shelton
- (Ontario) Claire Thompson
- (British Columbia) Micah Zandee-Hart

Forwards

- (Saskatchewan) Emily Clark
- (Ontario) Sarah Fillier
- (Ontario) Brianne Jenner
- (Ontario) Rebecca Johnston
- (Ontario) Emma Maltais
- (Ontario) Sarah Nurse
- (Ontario) Kristin O'Neill
- (British Columbia) Sarah Potomak
- (Quebec) Marie-Philip Poulin – C
- (Ontario) Jamie Lee Rattray
- (Alberta) Danielle Serdachny
- (Ontario) Natalie Spooner
- (Ontario) Laura Stacey
- (Nova Scotia) Blayre Turnbull – A

=== 2022 IIHF Women's World Championship ===
- Head coach: (Nova Scotia) Troy Ryan
- Assistant coach: (Nova Scotia) Kori Cheverie
- Assistant coach: (Ontario) Ali Domenico
- Assistant coach: (Quebec) Caroline Ouellette

Goaltenders

- (Manitoba) Kristen Campbell
- (Quebec) Ann-Renée Desbiens
- (Alberta) Emerance Maschmeyer

Skaters

Defence

- (Ontario) Erin Ambrose
- (Manitoba) Ashton Bell
- (Ontario) Renata Fast
- (Manitoba) Jocelyne Larocque – A
- (Saskatchewan) Meaghan Mikkelson
- (Ontario) Ella Shelton
- (British Columbia) Micah Zandee-Hart

Forwards

- (Ontario) Victoria Bach
- (Saskatchewan) Emily Clark
- (Ontario) Jessie Eldridge
- (Ontario) Sarah Fillier
- (Ontario) Brianne Jenner
- (Ontario) Emma Maltais
- (Ontario) Sarah Nurse
- (Ontario) Kristin O'Neill
- (British Columbia) Sarah Potomak
- (Quebec) Marie-Philip Poulin – C
- (Ontario) Jamie Lee Rattray
- (Ontario) Laura Stacey
- (Nova Scotia) Blayre Turnbull – A

=== 2021 IIHF Women's World Championship ===
- Head coach: (Nova Scotia) Troy Ryan
- Assistant coach: (Nova Scotia) Kori Cheverie
- Assistant coach: (Ontario) Doug Derraugh
- Assistant coach: (Ontario) Jim Midgley

Goaltenders

- (Manitoba) Kristen Campbell
- (Quebec) Ann-Renée Desbiens
- (Alberta) Emerance Maschmeyer

Skaters

Defence

- (Ontario) Erin Ambrose
- (Manitoba) Ashton Bell
- (Ontario) Jaime Bourbonnais
- (Ontario) Renata Fast
- (Manitoba) Jocelyne Larocque
- (Ontario) Ella Shelton
- (Ontario) Claire Thompson

Forwards

- (Ontario) Victoria Bach
- (Saskatchewan) Emily Clark
- (Quebec) Mélodie Daoust
- (Ontario) Sarah Fillier
- (Ontario) Brianne Jenner – A
- (Ontario) Rebecca Johnston
- (Ontario) Emma Maltais
- (Ontario) Sarah Nurse
- (Ontario) Kristin O'Neill
- (Quebec) Marie-Philip Poulin – C
- (Ontario) Jamie Lee Rattray
- (Nova Scotia) Jill Saulnier
- (Ontario) Natalie Spooner
- (Ontario) Laura Stacey
- (Nova Scotia) Blayre Turnbull – A

=== 2019 IIHF Women's World Championship ===
Head coach: Perry Pearn

Goaltenders

- Shannon Szabados
- Geneviève Lacasse
- Emerance Maschmeyer

Defence

- Jocelyne Larocque
- Brigette Lacquette
- Laura Fortino
- Micah Zandee-Hart
- Jaime Bourbonnais
- Erin Ambrose
- Renata Fast

Forwards

- Rebecca Johnston
- Laura Stacey
- Jillian Saulnier
- Mélodie Daoust
- Brianne Jenner
- Sarah Nurse
- Natalie Spooner
- Emily Clark
- Marie-Philip Poulin
- Loren Gabel
- Ann-Sophie Bettez
- Blayre Turnbull
- Jamie Lee Rattray

=== 2017 IIHF Women's World Championship ===
Head coach: Laura Schuler

Goaltenders

- Shannon Szabados
- Geneviève Lacasse
- Emerance Maschmeyer

Defence

- Brigette Lacquette
- Lauriane Rougeau
- Laura Fortino
- Meaghan Mikkelson
- Halli Krzyzaniak
- Erin Ambrose
- Renata Fast

Forwards

- Meghan Agosta
- Rebecca Johnston
- Jennifer Wakefield
- Bailey Bram
- Brianne Jenner
- Haley Irwin
- Natalie Spooner
- Emily Clark
- Marie-Philip Poulin
- Sarah Davis
- Blayre Turnbull
- Laura Stacey
- Sarah Potomak

=== 2016 IIHF Women's World Championship ===
Head coach: Laura Schuler

Goaltenders

- Charline Labonté
- Erica Howe
- Emerance Maschmeyer

Defence

- Brigette Lacquette
- Meaghan Mikkelson
- Laura Fortino
- Halli Krzyzaniak
- Lauriane Rougeau
- Jocelyne Larocque
- Tara Watchorn

Forwards

- Meghan Agosta
- Rebecca Johnston
- Jamie Lee Rattray
- Jennifer Wakefield
- Jillian Saulnier
- Bailey Bram
- Brianne Jenner
- Hayley Wickenheiser
- Natalie Spooner
- Marie-Philip Poulin
- Sarah Davis
- Emily Clark
- Blayre Turnbull

=== 2015 IIHF Women's World Championship ===
Head coach: Doug Derraugh

Goaltenders

- Emerance Maschmeyer
- Ann-Renée Desbiens
- Geneviève Lacasse

Defence

- Brigette Lacquette
- Courtney Birchard
- Laura Fortino
- Halli Krzyzaniak
- Lauriane Rougeau
- Jocelyne Larocque
- Tara Watchorn

Forwards

- Rebecca Johnston
- Jamie Lee Rattray
- Jennifer Wakefield
- Jillian Saulnier
- Caroline Ouellette
- Bailey Bram
- Brianne Jenner
- Haley Irwin
- Natalie Spooner
- Jessica Campbell
- Marie-Philip Poulin
- Sarah Davis
- Emily Clark
- Kelly Terry

=== 2013 IIHF Women's World Championship ===
Head coach: Dan Church

Goaltenders

- Charline Labonté
- Geneviève Lacasse
- Shannon Szabados

Defence

- Jocelyne Larocque
- Meaghan Mikkelson
- Catherine Ward
- Tessa Bonhomme
- Courtney Birchard
- Laura Fortino
- Lauriane Rougeau

Forwards

- Meghan Agosta
- Rebecca Johnston
- Jennifer Wakefield
- Gillian Apps
- Caroline Ouellette
- Jayna Hefford
- Bailey Bram
- Brianne Jenner
- Haley Irwin
- Hayley Wickenheiser – C
- Natalie Spooner
- Sarah Vaillancourt
- Marie-Philip Poulin

=== 2012 IIHF Women's World Championship ===
Head coach: Dan Church

Goaltenders

- Charline Labonté
- Geneviève Lacasse
- Shannon Szabados

Defence

- Jocelyne Larocque
- Meaghan Mikkelson
- Tessa Bonhomme
- Catherine Ward
- Courtney Birchard
- Laura Fortino
- Lauriane Rougeau

Forwards

- Meghan Agosta
- Gillian Apps
- Vicki Bendus
- Bailey Bram
- Jayna Hefford
- Haley Irwin
- Brianne Jenner
- Rebecca Johnston
- Caroline Ouellette
- Marie-Philip Poulin
- Natalie Spooner
- Jennifer Wakefield
- Hayley Wickenheiser – C

=== 2011 IIHF Women's World Championship ===
Head coach: Ryan Walter

Goaltenders

- Charline Labonté
- Kim St-Pierre
- Shannon Szabados

Defence

- Jocelyne Larocque
- Meaghan Mikkelson
- Catherine Ward
- Tessa Bonhomme
- Bobbi-Jo Slusar
- Tara Watchorn

Forwards

- Meghan Agosta
- Rebecca Johnston
- Cherie Piper
- Gillian Apps
- Caroline Ouellette
- Jayna Hefford
- Jennifer Wakefield
- Haley Irwin
- Hayley Wickenheiser – C
- Natalie Spooner
- Sarah Vaillancourt
- Marie-Philip Poulin

=== 2009 Women's World Ice Hockey Championships ===
Head coach: Melody Davidson

Goaltenders

- Charline Labonté
- Kim St-Pierre
- Shannon Szabados

Defence

- Tessa Bonhomme
- Gillian Ferarri
- Becky Kellar
- Carla MacLeod
- Colleen Sostorics
- Catherine Ward

Forwards

- Meghan Agosta
- Gillian Apps
- Jennifer Botterill
- Jayna Hefford
- Rebecca Johnston
- Gina Kingsbury
- Haley Irwin
- Meaghan Mikkelson
- Caroline Ouellette
- Marie-Philip Poulin
- Hayley Wickenheiser
- Sarah Vaillancourt

=== 2008 Women's World Ice Hockey Championships ===
Head coach: Peter Smith

Goaltenders

- Charline Labonté
- Kim St-Pierre

Defence

- Delaney Collins
- Gillian Ferarri
- Becky Kellar
- Carla MacLeod
- Meaghan Mikkelson
- Colleen Sostorics

Forwards

- Meghan Agosta
- Gillian Apps
- Kelly Bechard
- Jennifer Botterill
- Jayna Hefford
- Rebecca Johnston
- Gina Kingsbury
- Caroline Ouellette
- Cherie Piper
- Sarah Vaillancourt
- Katie Weatherston
- Hayley Wickenheiser

=== 2007 Women's World Ice Hockey Championships ===
Head coach: Melody Davidson

Goaltenders

- Charline Labonté
- Kim St-Pierre

Defence

- Tessa Bonhomme
- Delaney Collins
- Gillian Ferarri
- Carla MacLeod
- Cheryl Pounder
- Colleen Sostorics

Forwards

- Meghan Agosta
- Gillian Apps
- Kelly Bechard
- Jennifer Botterill
- Danielle Goyette
- Jayna Hefford
- Gina Kingsbury
- Caroline Ouellette
- Vicky Sunohara
- Sarah Vaillancourt
- Katie Weatherston
- Hayley Wickenheiser

=== 2005 Women's World Ice Hockey Championships ===
Head coach: Melody Davidson

Goaltenders

- Charline Labonté
- Kim St-Pierre

Defence

- Correne Bredin
- Delaney Collins
- Becky Kellar
- Carla MacLeod
- Cheryl Pounder
- Colleen Sostorics

Forwards

- Gillian Apps
- Kelly Bechard
- Jennifer Botterill
- Cassie Campbell
- Danielle Goyette
- Jayna Hefford
- Gina Kingsbury
- Caroline Ouellette
- Cherie Piper
- Vicky Sunohara
- Sarah Vaillancourt
- Hayley Wickenheiser

=== 2004 Women's World Ice Hockey Championships ===
Head coach: Karen Hughes

Goaltenders

- Kim St-Pierre
- Sami Jo Small

Defence

- Thérèse Brisson
- Delaney Collins
- Gillian Ferarri
- Becky Kellar
- Cheryl Pounder
- Colleen Sostorics

Forwards

- Gillian Apps
- Dana Antal
- Kelly Bechard
- Jennifer Botterill
- Cassie Campbell
- Gina Kingsbury
- Danielle Goyette
- Jayna Hefford
- Caroline Ouellette
- Cherie Piper
- Vicky Sunohara
- Hayley Wickenheiser

Alternates

- Sarah Vaillancourt (forward)
- Charline Labonté (goaltender)

=== 2001 Women's World Ice Hockey Championships ===
Head coach: Daniele Sauvageau

Goaltenders

- Kim St-Pierre
- Sami Jo Small

Skaters

- Dana Antal
- Kelly Bechard
- Jennifer Botterill
- Correne Bredin
- Thérèse Brisson
- Cassie Campbell
- Isabelle Chartrand
- Nancy Drolet
- Danielle Goyette
- Geraldine Heaney
- Jayna Hefford
- Becky Kellar
- Gina Kingsbury
- Caroline Ouellette
- Cheryl Pounder
- Tammy Lee Shewchuk
- Colleen Sostorics
- Vicky Sunohara

=== 2000 IIHF Women's World Championship ===
Head coach: Melody Davidson

Goaltenders

- Kim St-Pierre
- Sami Jo Small

Skaters

- Kelly Bechard
- Amanda Benoit
- Jennifer Botterill
- Thérèse Brisson
- Cassie Campbell
- Delaney Collins
- Nancy Drolet
- Lori Dupuis
- Danielle Goyette
- Geraldine Heaney
- Jayna Hefford
- Becky Kellar
- Caroline Ouellette
- Cheryl Pounder
- Nathalie Rivard
- Tammy Lee Shewchuk
- Vicky Sunohara
- Hayley Wickenheiser

=== 1999 IIHF Women's World Championship ===
Head coach: Daniele Sauvageau

Goaltenders

- Kim St-Pierre
- Sami Jo Small

Skaters

- Amanda Benoit
- Thérèse Brisson
- Jennifer Botterill
- Cassie Campbell
- Nancy Drolet
- Lori Dupuis
- Danielle Goyette
- Geraldine Heaney
- Jayna Hefford
- Becky Kellar
- Mai-Lan Le
- Caroline Ouellette
- Cheryl Pounder
- Nathalie Rivard
- France Saint-Louis
- Fiona Smith
- Vicky Sunohara
- Hayley Wickenheiser

=== 1997 IIHF Women's World Championship ===
Head coach: Shannon Miller

Goaltenders

- Danielle Dube
- Lesley Reddon

Skaters

- Thérèse Brisson
- Cassie Campbell
- Judy Diduck
- Nancy Drolet
- Lori Dupuis
- Rebecca Fahey
- Danielle Goyette
- Geraldine Heaney
- Jayna Hefford
- Angela James
- Luce Letendre
- Karen Nystrom
- France Saint-Louis
- Laura Schuler
- Fiona Smith
- Vicky Sunohara
- Hayley Wickenheiser
- Stacy Wilson

=== 1994 IIHF Women's World Championship ===
Head coach: Les Lawton

Goaltenders

- Lesley Reddon
- Manon Rhéaume

Skaters

- Thérèse Brisson
- Cassie Campbell
- Judy Diduck
- Nancy Drolet
- Danielle Goyette
- Marianne Grnak
- Geraldine Heaney
- Andria Hunter
- Angela James
- Laura Leslie
- Karen Nystrom
- Margot Page
- Nathalie Picard
- Cheryl Pounder
- Jane Robinson
- France Saint-Louis
- Hayley Wickenheiser
- Stacy Wilson

=== 1992 IIHF Women's World Championship ===
Head coach: Rick Polutnik

Goaltenders

- Manon Rhéaume
- Marie-Claude Roy

Skaters

- Judy Diduck
- Nancy Drolet
- Heather Ginzel
- Danielle Goyette
- Geraldine Heaney
- Andria Hunter
- Angela James
- Dawn McGuire
- Diane Michaud
- France Montour
- Karen Nystrom
- Nathalie Picard
- Nathalie Rivard
- France Saint-Louis
- Sue Scherer
- Laura Schuler
- Margot Verlaan
- Stacy Wilson

=== 1990 IIHF Women's World Championship ===
Head coach: Dave McMaster

Goaltenders

- Denise Caron
- Cathy Phillips

Defence

- Judy Diduck
- Geraldine Heaney
- Teresa Hutchinson
- Dawn McGuire
- Diane Michaud
- Brenda Richard

Forwards

- Shirley Cameron
- Heather Ginzel
- Angela James
- France Montour
- Kim Ratushny
- Sue Scherer
- Laura Schuler
- France Saint-Louis
- Vicky Sunohara
- Margot Verlaan
- Stacy Wilson
- Susana Yuen

== See also ==
- Ice hockey at the 2006 Winter Olympics
- Ice hockey at the 2006 Winter Olympics match stats (women)
- Ice hockey
- Ice hockey statistics
- List of United States women's national ice hockey team rosters
