= Shirley Cameron =

Canadian ice hockey player

- Born: August 12, 1952 (age 74) Bonnyville, Alberta, Canada
- Height: 5 ft 4 in (163 cm)
- National team: Canada
- Playing career: 1972–1992
Medal record
Representing Canada
Women's ice hockey
IIHF World Women's Championships
Gold medal – first place	1990 Canada	Tournament

Shirley Cameron (born August 12, 1952) is a Canadian former ice hockey coach and player. She played her entire career with the Edmonton Chimos. She was a three-time Abby Hoffman Cup national champion as a player with the Chimos and later a one-time champion as a coach.

She was a member of the Canadian National Team that won gold at the Women’s World Hockey Championships in 1990.

== Playing career ==
Shirley Cameron was an original member of the Edmonton Chimos and she played in 10 National Championships as a player from 1982 to 1992 after the competition was inaugurated.

She won the Abby Hoffman Cup for the first time in 1984 when she was also named the tournament's Most Valuable Player. She won her second national title in 1985.

In her final season as a player, she won her third Abby Hoffman Cup with the Chimos.

== Coaching career ==
After her playing career, Cameron served as head coach of the Edmonton Chimos. She led them to a national title in 1997.

== Career statistics ==
=== International ===
Year	Team	Event	Result	GP	G	A	Pts	PIM
1990	Canada	WC	1st place, gold medalist(s)	5	5	6	11	0

== Awards and honours ==
Award	Year
Abby Hoffman Cup	1984, 1985, 1992
Most Valuable Player at the National Championships	1984
Hockey Canada Female Hockey Breakthrough Award	2006
Alberta Sports Hall of Fame	2016
Alberta Hockey Hall of Fame	2019
