= List of IIHF Women's World Championship Directorate award winners =

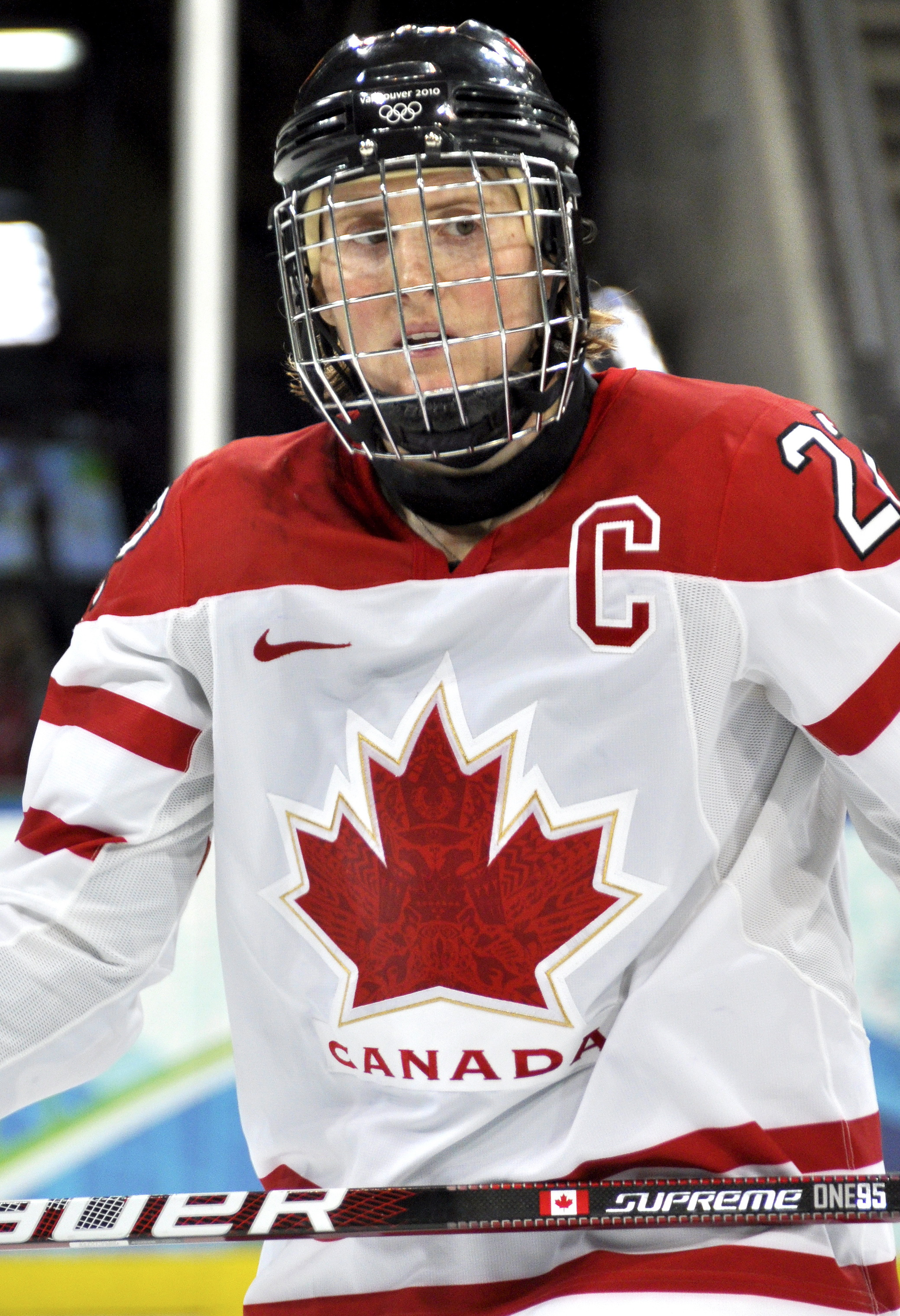
Canadian Hayley Wickenheiser has been named the top forward twice and most valuable player once at the Women's World Championships.

The International Ice Hockey Federation (IIHF) Women's World Championship is contested annually in non-Olympic years. The "top division" consists of the nine highest ranked countries. The event was first contested in 1990. It became an annual event (except in Olympic years), starting in 1997. After each event, the IIHF has handed out awards to the top participants. The awards for Most Valuable Player, Top Defenseman, Top Forward and Top Goaltender have been presented in some combination except after the 1997 tournament.

The IIHF directorate at each tournament is made up of one member from each of the participating member nations. These members vote on the awards, which are presented after the gold medal game of the tournament.

Year	Best Goalie	Best Defenceman	Best Forward	Most Valuable Player	Ref
1990	(United States) Kelly Dyer	(Canada) Dawn McGuire	(Finland) Riikka Nieminen	(Canada) Dawn McGuire	
1992	(Sweden) Annica Åhlén	(Canada) Geraldine Heaney	(United States) Cammi Granato	—	
1994	(United States) Erin Whitten	(Canada) Geraldine Heaney	(Finland) Riikka Nieminen	—	
1997	—	—	—	—	
1999	(Canada) Sami Jo Small	(Finland) Kirsi Hänninen	(United States) Jenny Potter	—	
2000	(Canada) Sami Jo Small	(United States) Angela Ruggiero	(Finland) Katja Riipi	—	
2001	(Canada) Kim St-Pierre	(United States) Karyn Bye	(Canada) Jennifer Botterill	(Canada) Jennifer Botterill	
2003	Event cancelled due to SARS outbreak				
2004	(Canada) Kim St-Pierre	(United States) Angela Ruggiero	(Canada) Jayna Hefford	(Canada) Jennifer Botterill	
2005	(United States) Chanda Gunn	(United States) Angela Ruggiero	(Canada) Jayna Hefford	(United States) Krissy Wendell	
2007	(Finland) Noora Räty	(United States) Molly Engstrom	(Canada) Hayley Wickenheiser	(Canada) Hayley Wickenheiser	
2008	(Finland) Noora Räty	(United States) Angela Ruggiero	(United States) Natalie Darwitz	(Finland) Noora Räty	
2009	(Canada) Charline Labonté	(Finland) Jenni Hiirikoski	(Canada) Hayley Wickenheiser	(Canada) Carla MacLeod	
2011	(Finland) Noora Räty	(Canada) Meaghan Mikkelson	(United States) Monique Lamoureux-Kolls	(Slovakia) Zuzana Tomčíková	
2012	(Switzerland) Florence Schelling	(Finland) Jenni Hiirikoski	(United States) Kelli Stack		
2013	(Russia) Nadezhda Alexandrova	(Finland) Jenni Hiirikoski	(Canada) Marie-Philip Poulin	(Canada) Marie-Philip Poulin	
2015	(Japan) Nana Fujimoto	(Finland) Jenni Hiirikoski	(United States) Hilary Knight	(United States) Hilary Knight	
2016	(Canada) Emerance Maschmeyer	(Finland) Jenni Hiirikoski	(United States) Hilary Knight	(United States) Hilary Knight	
2017	(Finland) Noora Räty	(Finland) Jenni Hiirikoski	(United States) Brianna Decker	(United States) Brianna Decker	
2019	(Finland) Noora Räty	(Finland) Jenni Hiirikoski	(United States) Kendall Coyne Schofield	(Finland) Jenni Hiirikoski	
2020	Event cancelled due to COVID-19 pandemic				
2021	(Finland) Anni Keisala	(United States) Lee Stecklein	(Canada) Mélodie Daoust	(Canada) Mélodie Daoust	
2022	(United States) Nicole Hensley	(Czech Republic) Daniela Pejšová	(United States) Taylor Heise	(United States) Taylor Heise	
2023	(Canada) Ann-Renée Desbiens	(United States) Caroline Harvey	(Canada) Sarah Fillier	(Canada) Sarah Fillier	
2024	(Germany) Sandra Abstreiter	(Canada) Renata Fast	(United States) Alex Carpenter	(United States) Laila Edwards	
2025	(United States) Aerin Frankel	(United States) Caroline Harvey	(Canada) Marie-Philip Poulin	(Canada) Marie-Philip Poulin	
2026	(United States) Aerin Frankel	(United States) Caroline Harvey	(United States) Hilary Knight	(United States) Caroline Harvey	
