= Angela James =

Canadian ice hockey player (born 1964)

Angela James OC
- Hockey Hall of Fame, 2010
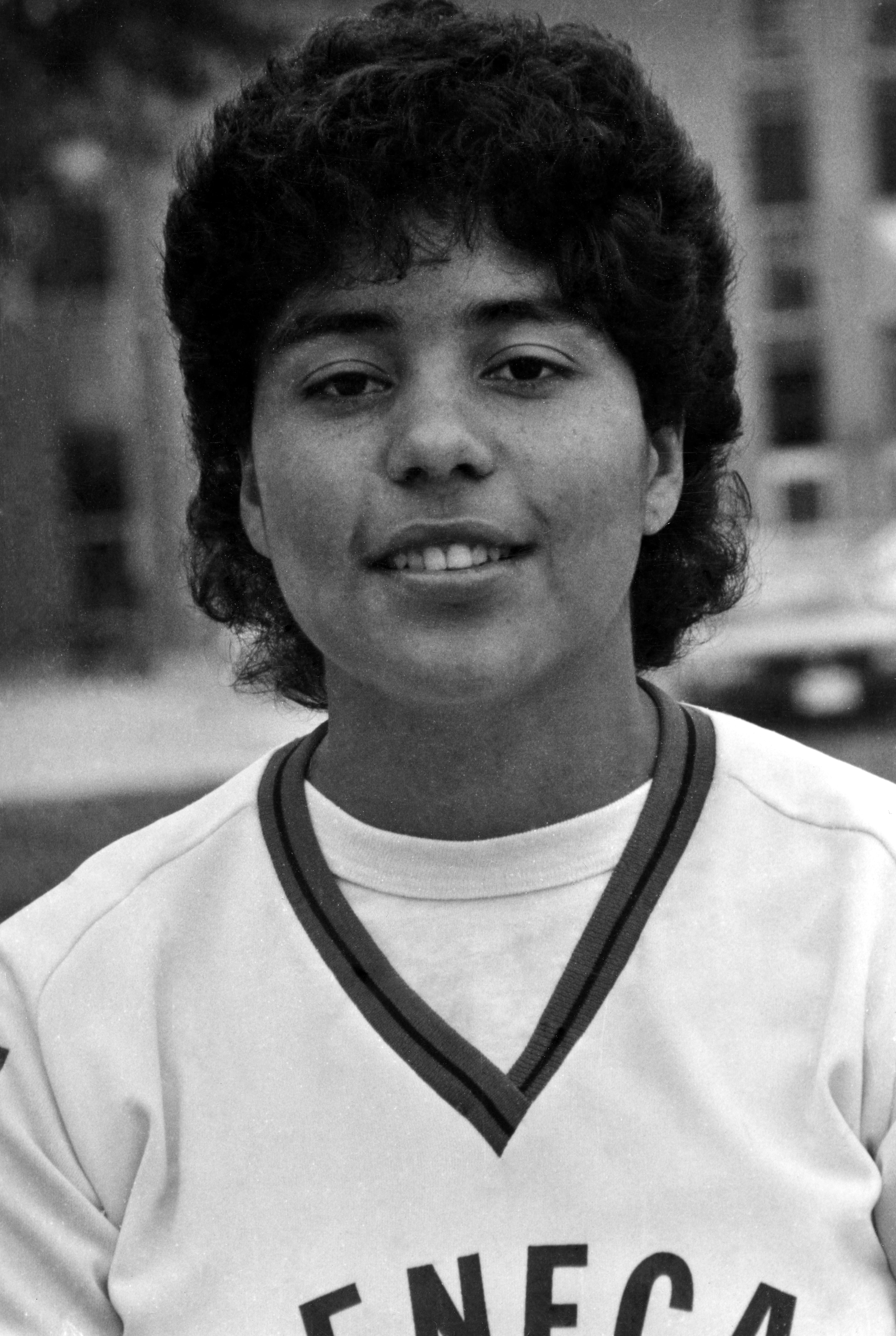
- James at Seneca College, c. 1983
- Born: December 22, 1964 (age 61) Toronto, Ontario, Canada
- Height: 5 ft 6 in (168 cm)
- Weight: 155 lb (70 kg; 11 st 1 lb)
- Position: Centre / Defence
- Shot: Right
- Played for: Seneca College; North York Aeros; Toronto Red Wings; Newtonbrook Panthers; Beatrice Aeros
- National team: Canada
- Playing career: 1980–2000

Angela James OC (born December 22, 1964) is a Canadian former ice hockey player who played at the highest levels of senior hockey between 1980 and 2000. She was a member of numerous teams in the Central Ontario Women's Hockey League (COWHL) from its founding in 1980 until 1998 and finished her career in the National Women's Hockey League (NWHL). She was named her league's most valuable player six times. James is also a certified referee in Canada, and a coach. She lives in Richmond Hill, Ontario.

Internationally, James played in the first women's world championship, a 1987 tournament that was unsanctioned. She played with Team Canada in the first IIHF World Women's Championship in 1990, setting a scoring record of 11 goals and leading Canada to the gold medal. She played in three additional world championships, winning gold medals in 1992, 1994 and 1997. Controversially, she was left off the team for the first women's Olympic hockey tournament in 1998. She played in her final international tournament in 1999.

Considered the first superstar of modern women's ice hockey, James has been honoured by numerous halls of fame. She was one of the first three women inducted into the International Ice Hockey Federation (IIHF) Hockey Hall of Fame in 2008 and one of the first two inducted into the Hockey Hall of Fame in 2010. She was the first openly gay player inducted into the Hockey Hall of Fame and the second Black player. She was inducted into Canada's Sports Hall of Fame in 2009. James was named to the Order of Hockey in Canada in 2021.

James served as co-owner of and general manager for the Toronto Six of the now-defunct Premier Hockey Federation, and as of 2022 is the Senior Sports Coordinator at Seneca College in Toronto.

== Early life ==
James was born on December 22, 1964, in Toronto, Ontario. She is the daughter of Donna Barrato, a white Canadian from Toronto, and Leo James, a Black American from Mississippi who came to Canada to escape racial segregation. She has two half-brothers and two half-sisters on her mother's side. Her father, who was involved with a Toronto nightclub, estimates she has at least nine half-siblings by him, though Angela believes the number is closer to 15. Among them is National Hockey League (NHL) player Theo Peckham.

A single mother, Donna raised Angela and her two half-sisters with the help of government assistance. They lived in a subsidized townhouse in the Flemingdon Park neighbourhood of Toronto. Donna worked as a bookkeeper and at the concession stand of the local arena. She battled depression and mental illness and her eldest daughter, Cindy, worked two part-time jobs at the age of 16 to help the family meet financial obligations. Angela was closest to her sister Kym, though the two often fought as children. Her father never had a consistent place in her life growing up and did not provide financial support to the family, but was available if she needed him. As one of few Black children in Flemingdon Park, Angela often faced insults, particularly over the fact that she was a mixed-race child with a white mother and sisters. She often got into fights over the slurs, forming a combative attitude she carried into the game of hockey. Her maternal grandparents never accepted Angela as a child, though they treated her sisters well.

James quickly developed an interest in sports. Her godfather gave her a baseball bat and glove to celebrate her first holy communion. She excelled at hockey, baseball, and synchronized swimming as a young child. Her mother wanted her to focus on swimming due to the lack of opportunities for girls in hockey in the 1970s. Her passion was for hockey, however, and she was constantly playing ball hockey with the neighbourhood boys from the time she was in kindergarten. James first played organized hockey in a Flemingdon Park boys house league at the age of eight, and then only after her mother threatened legal action as officials opposed her inclusion.

James dominated the Flemingdon Park league. She started in the novice (7–8 year old) age group, but her skill level was so much higher than her peers that she was moved up to atom and then peewee (11 and 12-year-olds). James's participation in the Flemingdon Park league ended partway through her second year due to jealousy from the parents of the boys in the league. The president's son was on James's team, and was particularly offended that his boy was being overshadowed by a girl. He ordered a change in the league's policy to forbid girls from playing.

The only feasible option James had for a girls league was at Annunciation, a Catholic organization in the Don Mills district. Lacking a vehicle to drive to the games, her mother would take her to and from games at various rinks via the bus. The girls' hockey program was small, requiring that teams be made up of players from all age groups in order to field complete rosters. Skipping the bantam age group entirely, James first played senior hockey with the Newtonbrook Saints. She was 13 at the time, playing against women 16 and older. The Saints were a Senior C team, the fourth-highest level of women's hockey in the Toronto area at the time.

== Playing career ==
=== College ===
Focused on hockey, exposed to drugs and alcohol, and frequently getting into fights, James paid little attention to her education and nearly dropped out of school. A vice-principal at Valley Park Middle School, Ross Dixon, encouraged her to pay greater attention to her studies, allowing her to graduate from Overlea High School, now named Marc Garneau Collegiate Institute, and move on to Seneca College in Toronto. James struggled academically in her first year at Seneca, partially because she had rarely been held accountable for failing in her studies in the past, and partly because she was playing two sports at both the college and community level while working part-time jobs to help pay the family's bills. Seneca's hockey coach Lee Trempe had several arguments with James before she began to take her studies seriously.

James was a two-sport star for the Seneca Scouts. She joined the softball team in 1983, playing the outfield and batting cleanup. She was an Ontario Colleges Athletic Association (OCAA) All-Star and led her school to the inaugural OCAA women's softball championship. She was named an OCAA All-Star again in 1984 and 1985, leading Seneca to another provincial championship and a silver medal finish.

Though James always played forward in her community hockey leagues, Trempe converted her to defence so that she could set up the plays and incorporate her teammates into the offensive systems the team used. Despite the change in position, James still led the league in scoring in 1982–83, recording 15 goals and 10 assists in an 8-game season. She was named the OCAA's most valuable player, but Seneca settled for the silver medal after losing the OCAA finals. Leading the OCAA with 30 points in 10 games in 1983–84, James carried Seneca College to its first championship. She was named an All-Star on defence, and again voted the most valuable player. James won both awards again the following season. Seneca repeated as champions in 1984–85 while James dominated the OCAA. She again led the league in scoring, setting school and association records with 50 goals and 73 points in just 14 games. Her scoring exploits led a Toronto reporter to call James "the Wayne Gretzky of women's hockey".

The OCAA named James its athlete of the year in both 1984 and 1985 for her exploits in hockey and softball. She set OCAA career hockey records of 80 goals and 128 points, which stood through to 1989 when the OCAA disbanded its women's hockey program due to a lack of competing teams. Seneca College retired her jersey number 8 in 2001, she was inducted into the Seneca Varsity Hall of Fame in 1985 and in 2004, received the Seneca College Distinguished Alumni Award.

=== Senior ===
After one year of Senior C hockey, James moved up to the Toronto Islanders in 1980, a Senior AA team in the newly founded Central Ontario Women's Hockey League (COWHL). The league was at the highest level of women's hockey in southern Ontario at the time, and James established herself as one of the league's stars within a year. She played in the first women's national championship in 1982, scoring the tying goal in the third period en route to a 3–2 overtime victory over Team Alberta to win the McTeer Cup.

When the Islanders folded in 1982, James moved to a team in Burlington, where she stayed for three seasons. In 1983, she led her new team to the national title as Burlington captured the inaugural Abby Hoffman Cup. For James, appearances in the women's nationals were nearly an annual event, as she played in 12 national championship tournaments.

James changed teams frequently, moving for a variety of reasons. She often changed teams to follow friends or if she did not agree with the coach's philosophy. Sometimes she moved out of necessity, such as if a team ceased operations. She left Burlington in 1984–85 to join Lee Trempe with the Agincourt Canadians for one season, then played with the Brampton Canadettes for another. In 1986–87 she again followed Trempe to the Mississauga Warriors, where she stayed for three seasons. James won her first of seven consecutive COWHL scoring titles that season, then was loaned to the Hamilton Golden Hawks for the 1987 Women's Nationals and helped lead that team to victory.

Changing teams again, James joined the Toronto Aeros in 1989. The Aeros had formed in 1974 as an outgrowth of the Annunciation team she played with as a child. She led the team to two national championships, in 1991 and 1993. In the first, she scored the only goal, against future national team teammate Manon Rhéaume, in a 1–0 victory over Team Quebec. In the 1993–94 season James scored 40 goals and 70 points in 28 games. She continued to switch teams, joining the Toronto Red Wings/Newtonbrook Panthers franchise for a couple of seasons before rejoining the Aeros in 1997. She remained with the team when it was rebranded the Beatrice Aeros in 1998 and joined the newly formed National Women's Hockey League (NWHL). James scored 38 goals and 55 points in the inaugural NWHL season of 1998–99 and was named the league's most valuable player. The following season, she was named the Western Division's best forward and on its First All-Star team. The Aeros won their first NWHL title dominating the Sainte-Julie Pantheres in the finals. Also OWHA champions, the Aeros captured the women's nationals against Team Quebec. Once the season was over, James retired from competitive hockey in 2000.

=== International ===
Medal record

Women's ice hockey

World Championship
Gold medal – first place	1990 Ottawa, Ontario, Canada	
Gold medal – first place	1992 Tampere, Finland	
Gold medal – first place	1994 Lake Placid, USA	
Gold medal – first place	1997 Kitchener, Canada	

3 Nations Cup
Gold medal – first place	1996 Ontario/New York	
Gold medal – first place	1999 Quebec	

IIHF Women's Pacific Rim Championship
Gold medal – first place	1996 Vancouver, British Columbia, Canada	

The Ontario Women's Hockey Association (OWHA) hosted the first women's world championship in 1987. The event, which was not sanctioned by the International Ice Hockey Federation (IIHF), featured six participating teams while several nations sent observers. Team Canada was represented by the national champion Hamilton Golden Hawks, with whom James had played in the national tournament, while "Team Ontario" was represented by her usual club team in Mississauga. While she was eligible to play with either team in the tournament, James suited up for her usual Mississauga team. She led Team Ontario throughout, and after a 5–2 semi-final win over the United States, played for the title against Team Canada. Team Canada defeated James's Team Ontario, 4–0 in the final.

The IIHF sanctioned the first official Women's World Championship, held in 1990 and played in Ottawa. Canada and the United States easily dispatched their European rivals to reach the gold medal final, which Canada won by a 5–2 score. James scored the first goal in the tournament's history, and 11 overall. She tied American Cindy Curley for the tournament lead which, along with USA's Krissy Wendell in 2000, stands as the record for most goals by one player in one tournament, through 2012.

James appeared in three additional Women's World Championships, all three of which were won by Canada over the United States. She was named an All-Star at forward in the 1992 tournament in Tampere, Finland, where Canada won the gold medal with an 8–0 victory. The Americans provided a stronger challenge at the 1994 tournament in Lake Placid, New York. James scored two goals and was named the game's most valuable player in the final, a 6–3 victory. She won her fourth, and final, World Championship in 1997, a 4–3 overtime victory.

Reflecting the growth of the game, the 1998 Nagano Games featured the first women's Olympic hockey tournament. The announcement of Canada's first Olympic team on December 9, 1997, brought a storm of controversy. Head coach Shannon Miller left James off the roster, telling the press that the 32-year-old James was a "defensive liability" and suggesting she was not a team player. James was devastated at being cut and enraged by Miller's explanations. Stating she had been "treated like a dog" and "set up and cheated" by Miller, she appealed the decision to Hockey Canada. James also argued Miller's criticisms were unjustified and that the coach had previously maintained she was playing well. She was the national team's leading goal scorer in preliminary games that led up to the national team camp.

At the time of the appeal, rumours surfaced that Miller was having an affair with one of her players. While the allegations were unfounded, their timing resulted in James being falsely accused of being their source. Hockey Canada officials determined that the rumours were started by a third party attempting to create controversy. They also rejected James's appeal, ending her Olympic dream. Neither her teammates nor her opponents could understand how she was left off the team. Canada and the United States met in the final, as expected, but it was the Americans who emerged victorious. Having already defeated Canada 7–4 in the preliminary round, the Americans won the gold medal with a 3–1 victory. Former teammates argued that James could have made a difference for Canada had she been included.

At the time, James was suffering from the effects of undiagnosed Graves' disease, a thyroid condition that resulted suffering weight loss and fatigue throughout that camp. She learned of and was treated for her condition following the Olympics, recovering lost weight and strength. The national team, under a new coach, added James back to its roster for the 1999 3 Nations Cup. She was used sparingly, but accepted her diminished role with the team. During the tournament, James made the decision that it would be her last. James's international career ended in storybook fashion as the championship game, against the United States, went to a shootout. Selected as the first shooter, she scored the winning goal to lead Canada to a 3–2 victory. James played in 50 games for Team Canada, scoring 33 goals and 21 assists.

== Playing style ==
James was a dominant player in the OWHA. Women's hockey historian Elizabeth Etue attributed James's success to her skating strength and "dynamic, bullet-like shot". She was a physical player who helped the women's game overcome a reputation that it was not a sport where the players were willing to play a "gritty," tough style. Opponents claimed running into James was like "hitting steel". Canadian Broadcasting Corporation commentator Robin Brown, who played against James in the OWHA, said of her: "She could do it all. She had end-to-end speed, she had finesse as a stick handler and her slap shot was harder and more accurate than any female player I have ever seen. She was a pure goal scorer like Mike Bossy and aggressive like Mark Messier. In her prime, she was referred to as the 'Wayne Gretzky of women's hockey'." Capable of playing any position, James was primarily a centre during her senior career, but excelled on defence. In one game where her team was without a goaltender, she played the position and recorded a shutout.

== Coaching and officiating ==
James has been active in many areas of the sport. She gained accreditation as a referee in Canada in 1980, and has been an active official since. As a referee in a Senior D women's game in 1986, James was involved in an altercation with a player that resulted in the player becoming the first woman banned for life from the OWHA. The player became upset at a penalty James assessed, shoved a linesman and punched her. James ultimately gained level IV certification through Hockey Canada and has served as the OWHA's Referee-in-Chief.

Upon her graduation from Seneca College, James took up coaching. Serving first as an assistant coach, she helped Seneca win the Ontario College Championship, its third consecutive title. The school repeated as champions in 1987 with James as its head coach. She has coached at all age levels of the game, including the national championship. She was an assistant with the gold medal-winning Team Ontario at the 1999 Canada Winter Games, and led Ontario to a gold medal at the 2001 under-18 national championship. Prior to the 2010-11 CWHL season, she was named Brampton Thunder head coach, but, finding the responsibilities too time-consuming, she stepped down in December 2010. She believes she can offer the most at the grassroots level of the sport, and has operated both her own hockey school and directed one organized through Seneca College.

=== PHF ===
On June 24, 2021, the Toronto Six of the Premier Hockey Federation (PHF) added James to their coaching staff as an assistant coach and she served in that role for the 2021–22 PHF season.

== Sports executive & owner ==
On March 7, 2022, James became a co-owner of the Toronto Six of the Premier Hockey Federation after joining an ownership group comprising BIPOC Canadian hockey leaders including herself, Anthony Stewart, Bernice Carnegie, & Ted Nolan.

On May 31, 2022, James was named as General Manager of the Six, succeeding Krysti Clarke. Her new role with the team involves "manag(ing) player activities, team operations and logistics, as well as game day event management", including "selling tickets, which she will take charge of and report to the team's new ownership group.

== Honours and legacy ==
"She is a women's hockey hero who continues to inspire young players across the country. For me, she will always be the Wayne Gretzky of women's hockey"

— Bob Nicholson, President and CEO of Hockey Canada

James has been called "the Wayne Gretzky of women's hockey" and "the first superstar of modern women's hockey", and has been hailed as a pioneer who brought the women's game into the mainstream. Longtime women's hockey administrator Fran Rider stated that James brought credibility, without which the women's game would never have gained recognition as an Olympic sport.

An eight-time scoring champion and six-time most valuable player during her senior career, James has been honoured by several organizations. She was named Toronto's Youth of the Year in 1985 and was presented the city's Women in Sport Enhancement Award in 1992. Hockey Canada named her the 2005 recipient of its Female Hockey Breakthrough Award. The Flemingdon Park arena was renamed the Angela James Arena in 2009, and the Canadian Women's Hockey League presented the Angela James Bowl to its leading scorer each season. She has been inducted into several Halls of Fame, including the Ontario Colleges Athletic Association Hall of Fame in 2005, and the Black Hockey and Sports Hall of Fame in 2006.

Reflecting her role as a pioneer of the sport, James was one of the first three women, along with Geraldine Heaney and Cammi Granato, to be inducted into the IIHF Hall of Fame. They were enshrined in 2008 as part of the IIHF's 100th anniversary celebrations. Canada's Sports Hall of Fame hailed James as a role model upon inducting her in 2009. One year later, she joined Granato as the first two women inducted into the Hockey Hall of Fame. She was the first openly gay player inducted into the Hockey Hall of Fame and the second Black player, seven years after Grant Fuhr. James described being informed of her election as a day she never thought would happen, adding: "I'm really honoured to represent the female hockey players from all over the world".

On February 26, 2021, James was named to the Order of Hockey in Canada by Hockey Canada, in recognition of her career and contributions to the game in Canada.

James was appointed Officer of the Order of Canada (OC) in the 2022 Canadian honours.

She appeared in Ice Queens (2023), a documentary about the history of Black women in ice hockey.

== Personal life ==
After earning a diploma in Recreation Facilities Management from Seneca College, James was hired by the school as a sports programmer in 1985. She continues to work for Seneca and is now a senior sports coordinator at its King campus.

James realized as a teen that she is lesbian. She met her partner, Ange, in 1994, and the couple formalized their relationship in a commitment ceremony two years later. They have three children. Ange carried their first child, Christian, in 1999, and then gave birth to fraternal twins, son Michael and daughter Toni, in 2004.

== Career statistics ==
=== Regular season and playoffs ===
Note: Complete statistics unavailable

			Regular season					Playoffs
Season	Team	League	GP	G	A	Pts	PIM	GP	G	A	Pts	PIM
1982–83	Seneca College	OCAA	8	15	10	25	—
1983–84	Seneca College	OCAA	10	15	15	30	—
1984–85	Seneca College	OCAA	14	50	23	73	—
1992–93	North York Aeros	COWHL	23	16	18	34	67
1993–94	North York Aeros	COWHL	28	30	40	70	41
1995–96	Toronto Red Wings	COWHL	29	35	35	70	37
1996–97	Newtonbrook Panthers	COWHL	28	29	29	58	57
1997–98	North York Aeros	COWHL	9	6	3	9	19
1997–98	Canadian National Team	—	15	7	1	8	4
1998–99	Beatrice Aeros	NWHL	31	36	19	55	30
1999–00	Beatrice Aeros	NWHL	27	22	22	44	10
OCAA totals			32	80	48	128	NA
COWHL totals			117	116	125	241	76
NWHL totals			58	58	41	99	40

=== International ===
Year	Team	Comp	GP	G	A	Pts	PIM
1990	Canada	WC	5	11	2	13	10
1992	Canada	WC	5	5	2	7	2
1994	Canada	WC	5	4	5	9	2
1996	Canada	PRC	5	3	4	7	2
1996	Canada	3NC	5	1	2	3	2
1997	Canada	WC	5	2	3	5	2
1998	Canada	3NC	3	0	2	2	0
1999	Canada	3NC	2	0	0	0	0
Totals			35	26	20	46	20

== Awards and honours ==
Award	Year
Hockey Hall of Fame	2010
IIHF Hall of Fame	2008
Order of Hockey in Canada	2021
Canada's Sports Hall of Fame	2009
Abby Hoffman Cup	1982, 1983, 1986, 1987, 1991, 1993, 2000
NWHL Championship	1999-2000
Most Valuable Player, National Championships	1985, 1987
NWHL Most Valuable Player	1999-2000
Hockey Canada Female Hockey Breakthrough Award	2005
Etobicoke Sports Hall of Fame	2023
Ontario Colleges Athletic Hall of Fame	2023

== See also ==
- LGBTQ people in ice hockey
- Black players in ice hockey
