= 1987 Abby Hoffman Cup =

Canadian ice hockey championship trophy

Tournament details
- Venue: Byron Dobson Memorial Arena
- Dates: March 18–22, 1987
- Teams: 10

Final positions
- Champions: Hamilton Golden Hawks (2nd title)
- Runners-up: Edmonton Chimos
- Third place: Maidstone Saskies

Tournament statistics
- Games played: 29

Awards
- MVP: Angela James (Hamilton)

The 1987 Abby Hoffman Cup was the sixth staging of Hockey Canada's women's national championships (at the time known as the Shoppers Drug Mart Women's National Hockey Championships). The five-day competition was played in Riverview, New Brunswick. The Hamilton Golden Hawks won the Abby Hoffman Cup for the second year in a row after a 3–2 overtime victory over the Edmonton Chimos.

Teams played as many as seven games in just five days. Most games featured three periods which were just 12 minutes in length, while the Sunday final featured three periods of 15 minutes each. After round-robin action, the knockout phase featured quarterfinals, semifinals, and the final.

As Canadian champions, the Hamilton Golden Hawks represented Canada at the 1987 World Women's Hockey Tournament the following month in North York, Ontario.

In the final game, Kelly Weaver scored a hat trick including the winner in overtime. Angela James was named the tournament's most valuable player for the second time in three years.

== Teams participating ==
- Surrey Flyers, British Columbia
- Edmonton Chimos, Alberta (Host)
- Maidstone Saskies, Saskatchewan
- Winnipeg Canadian Polish AC, Manitoba
- Hamilton Golden Hawks, Ontario
- Carlton de Montréal, Québec
- Moncton Jaguars, New Brunswick
- Tignish Gaudette's Transit, Prince Edward Island
- Acadia Axettes, Nova Scotia
- Conception Bay South Lions, Newfoundland and Labrador
