= Dawn McGuire =

Canadian ice hockey player

- Born: 26 March 1960 (age 66) Edmonton, Alberta, Canada
- Height: 5 ft 4 in (163 cm)
- Weight: 125 lb (57 kg; 8 st 13 lb)
- Position: Defence
- National team: Canada
- Playing career: 1989–1992
Medal record
Representing Canada
Women's ice hockey
IIHF World Women's Championships
Gold medal – first place	1990	Tournament
Gold medal – first place	1992	Tournament

Dawn McGuire (born 26 March 1960) is a Canadian former ice hockey defender who played for the Edmonton Chimos, Brampton Canadettes, and Toronto Aeros. She was a five-time Abby Hoffman Cup national champion, four times with the Chimos and once with the Aeros. She was a two-time IIHF world champion with the Canadian National Team.

== Playing career ==
McGuire took part in the inaugural edition of the Women's National Championships with the Edmonton Chimos in 1982 and she won her first Abby Hoffman Cup in 1984. She won her second national title in 1985.

During a two-year period in the Toronto area, she helped the Toronto Aeros win the 1991 Abby Hoffman Cup.

McGuire then rejoined the Edmonton Chimos and won her fourth Abby Hoffman Cup in 1992. She won her fifth and last Canadian title in 1997.

At the international level, she represented Canada at the 1990 and 1992 IIHF Women's World Championships. She won gold medals at both tournaments. At the 1990 tournament, she was named the top defenceman and most valuable player.

== Career statistics ==
=== International ===
Year	Team	Event	Result	GP	G	A	Pts	PIM
1990	Canada	WC	1st place, gold medalist(s)	5	2	5	7	2
1992	Canada	WC	1st place, gold medalist(s)	5	0	1	1	4

== Awards and honours ==
Award	Year
Abby Hoffman Cup	1984, 1985, 1991, 1992, 1997
Most Valuable Player at the National Championships	1982
