= 1990 World Ice Hockey Championships =

1990 World Ice Hockey Championships may refer to:

- 1990 Men's World Ice Hockey Championships
- 1990 IIHF Women's World Championship
