= Troy Ryan =

Canadian ice hockey coach and executive

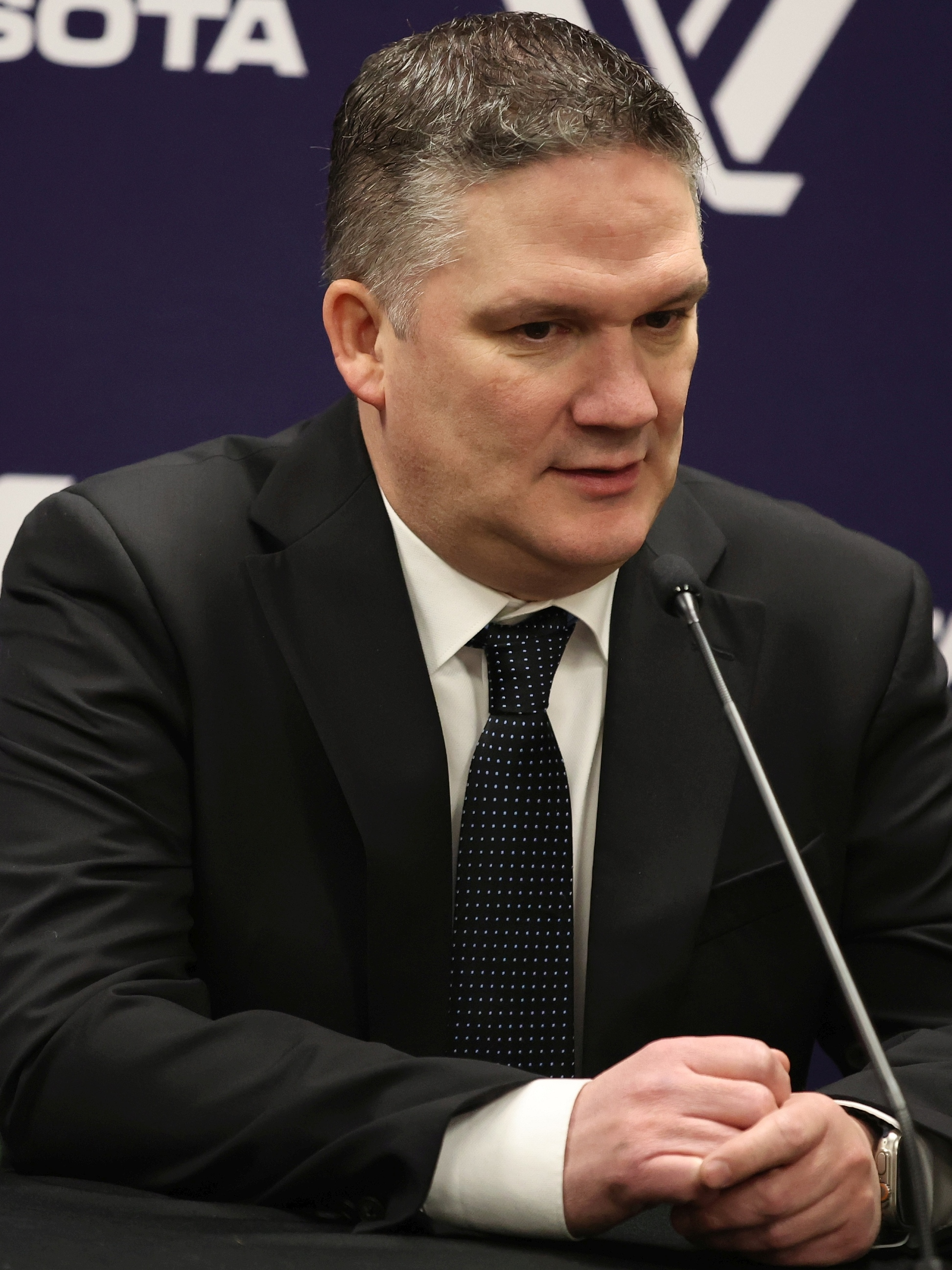
- Ryan in 2024
- Born: January 26, 1972 (age 54) Spryfield, Nova Scotia, Canada
- Position: Defence
- Shot: Left
- Current PWHL coach National team coach: San Jose Sea Lions; Canada
- Coached for: Toronto Sceptres
- Playing career: 1991–1998
- Coaching career: 2001–present

Troy Ryan (born January 26, 1972) is a Canadian ice hockey coach and the first head coach for the San Jose Sea Lions of the Professional Women's Hockey League (PWHL), for which he is also the inaugural general manager. He is a former head coach of the Canadian women's national ice hockey team.

== Playing career ==
Growing up in the Spryfield area of Halifax, Nova Scotia, Ryan competed in junior ice hockey at the AAA level with the Halifax McDonald's Midget team before joining the Halifax Mooseheads in the Maritime Junior A Hockey League (MHL). After his stint with the Mooseheads, Ryan played university hockey with two different programs. From 1993 to 1995, he skated for the Varsity Reds of the University of New Brunswick, followed by a pair of seasons with the Saint Mary's Huskies.

== Coaching career ==
Ryan also gained his first major coaching experience at the university level. Starting in 2001, Ryan enjoyed a pair of seasons with the Acadia Axemen men's varsity ice hockey program. Following his initial coaching foray in university ice hockey, Ryan joined the Maritime Junior A Hockey League in 2003, becoming general manager and head coach of the Antigonish Bulldogs. Afterwards, he served in those dual roles with the Pictou County Weeks Crushers from 2004 to 2009, taking the team to the semi-finals of the 2008 RBC Cup.

From 2013 to 2016, Ryan served in multiple capacities with the MHL's Campbellton Tigers, including head coach, general manager, and president. He also served in the same roles with the league's Metro Marauders from 2009 to 2011. Sandwiched in between those two stints in the MHL, he was head coach for the St. Thomas University Tommies men's ice hockey team of U Sports' Atlantic University Sport conference.

=== Women's ice hockey ===
In 2015, Ryan took on head coaching duties in two different women's ice hockey events. At the 2015 Canada Winter Games, Ryan served as bench boss for Team Nova Scotia, finishing in seventh place. As a side note, he had also served as head coach for the Nova Scotia men's team at the 2007 Canada Winter Games. For the 2015 National Women's Under-18 Championship, Ryan served in the same role with Team Atlantic, finishing fifth. One year later, Ryan was named Atlantic Canada's female coach mentor with the Canadian Sport Centre Atlantic.

In July 2020, Ryan became the head coach of the Dalhousie Tigers women's ice hockey program. On September 15, 2023, it was announced that Ryan would be leaving the Dalhousie Tigers to become the inaugural head coach for PWHL Toronto. During the 2023–24 season, he led Toronto to a 13–4–0–7 record and a league-leading 47 points. Following the season he was named PWHL Coach of the Year.

On May 22, 2026, the PWHL announced that Ryan was leaving the Toronto Sceptres to be the first head coach and general manager for the San Jose Sea Lions, making him the first person in PWHL history to hold both roles simultaneously.

=== Hockey Canada ===
With the Canadian women's national under-18 ice hockey team, Ryan enjoyed his first experiences as a head coach with Hockey Canada. In August 2016, Ryan served as bench boss for a three-game series in Calgary between the under-18 teams of Canada and the United States. He served in the same role, leading the Canadian contingent to a silver medal at the 2017 IIHF U18 Women's World Championship in the Czech Republic. Later in 2017, Ryan served as an assistant coach on the staff of head coach Perry Pearn with the Canadian national team at the 2017 4 Nations Cup in Tampa, Florida, a silver medal finish. He gained another silver as an assistant coach at the 2018 4 Nations Cup in Saskatoon, Saskatchewan.

During 2019, Ryan took on two different roles with Hockey Canada. In August, he was head coach for the Canadian national women's development team, facing off against the United States during a three-game series hosted in Lake Placid, New York. Additionally, Ryan was part of the coaching staff that gained a bronze medal at the 2019 IIHF Women's World Championship in Espoo, Finland.

In May 2021, it was announced that Ryan would serve as head coach for the Canadian women's team that competed in ice hockey at the 2022 Winter Olympics. He served behind the bench as Canada claimed gold in the women's ice hockey tournament at the 2022 Winter Olympics in Beijing.

He is contracted to continue as head coach of the Canadian national team through the 2026 Winter Olympics in Milan.

== Awards and honours ==
- Fred Page Cup (2008)
- Maritime Junior A Hockey League Coach of the Year (2005–06, 2007–08, 2008–09)
- MHL Coach of the Year (2015–16)
- Hockey Nova Scotia Lifetime Achievement Award (2011)
- Sport Nova Scotia Coach of the Year (2018)
- Acadia University Hockey Honour Roll (2023)
- PWHL Coach of the Year (2023–24)
