= Willie Desjardins =

Canadian ice hockey player, coach (b. 1957)

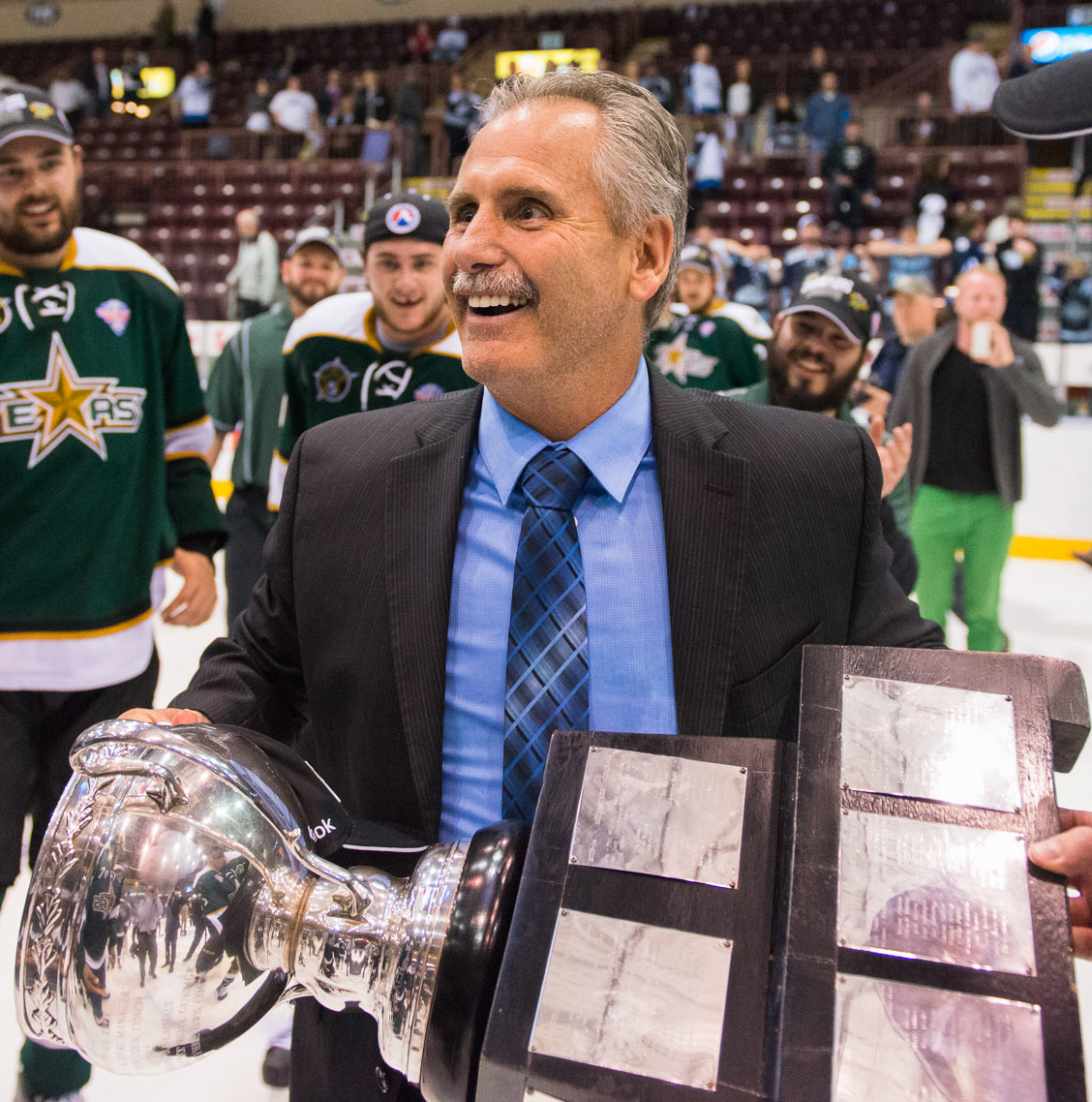
- Desjardins in 2014 with the Calder Cup
- Born: February 11, 1957 (age 69) Climax, Saskatchewan, Canada
- Height: 5 ft 8 in (173 cm)
- Weight: 160 lb (73 kg; 11 st 6 lb)
- Position: Centre
- Shot: Right
- Played for: Nijmegen Tigers
- Playing career: 1977–1984

Wilbrod "Willie" Desjardins (born February 11, 1957) is a Canadian professional ice hockey coach and player. He is currently head coach and general manager of the WHL's Medicine Hat Tigers. He has also been the head coach of the NHL's Vancouver Canucks from 2014 to 2017 and the interim head coach for the Los Angeles Kings for the 2018–19 season. In July 2017, he was named head of the coaching staff for Canada's men's team at the 2018 Winter Olympics in Pyeongchang, South Korea.

== Playing career ==
Desjardins began his hockey career playing in the Saskatchewan Junior Hockey League (SJHL) for the Moose Jaw Canucks from 1971 to 1974 and split the 1974-75 season between the Moose Jaw Canucks and the Swift Current Broncos (WHL). He played in the Western Canada Hockey League (WCHL) for the Lethbridge Broncos from 1975 through 1977.

He followed his junior hockey career by studying at the University of Saskatchewan and played with the Saskatchewan Huskies under head coach Dave King, serving as captain of the 1982-83 University of Saskatchewan Huskies team that won the national CIAU University Cup championship, after losing back-to-back national championship finals in previous seasons; with Desjardins winning the Major W.J. "Danny" McLeod Award in 1978, as Most Valuable Player of the national championship tournament. King recommended him to Alex Andjelic, head coach of Vissers Nijmegen in the Netherlands. Desjardins spent the 1983/84 season in Nijmegen and won, as captain, the first Dutch championship with the club.

== Coaching career ==
Desjardins began his coaching career at the University of Calgary in 1985 as assistant coach and became head coach in 1989. He then coached the Seibu Bears in Japan. He then returned to Canada and became head coach of the Saskatoon Blades, replacing Donn Clark midway through the 1997–98 season. He was then offered a job as an assistant coach for the Canada men's national team.

Once hired by the Medicine Hat Tigers, Desjardins was instrumental in the Tigers' first playoff appearance in five years in the 2002–03 season, leading them to a Memorial Cup appearance and their 4th WHL championship in 2003–04, and a 96-point Eastern Conference regular season champion 2004–05 season. Desjardins took on the duties of general manager for the 2005–06 season.

Desjardins was awarded the Dunc McCallum Memorial Trophy for the Coach of the Year in the Western Hockey League and the Canadian Hockey League.

In 2009, he was the assistant coach of Team Canada's World Junior Gold medal team, under head coach Pat Quinn and alongside fellow assistant coaches Guy Boucher and Dave Cameron. Desjardins was the head coach of Team Canada's 2010 World Junior Ice Hockey Championships team.

From 2010 to 2012, Desjardins served as the associate head coach of the Dallas Stars of the National Hockey League before being selected as the head coach of their AHL team in Cedar Park, Texas in June 2012. On June 17, 2014, he led his Texas Stars team to their first Calder Cup Championship.

On June 23, 2014, Desjardins was hired as the head coach for the Vancouver Canucks, replacing John Tortorella, who was dismissed as head coach after one season. On April 10, 2017, he was fired after the team missed the playoffs for the second consecutive season, along with assistants Perry Pearn and Doug Lidster. Desjardins posted a record of 109–110–27 in three seasons with the club.

On July 25, 2017, he was named head coach of Canada's men's team at the 2018 Winter Olympics in Pyeongchang, South Korea, with his university head coach Dave King as an assistant. In December 2017, he led Team Canada to gold at the Spengler Cup in Davos.

On November 4, 2018, Desjardins was named interim head coach by the Los Angeles Kings after they fired John Stevens. Desjardins' presence did not lead to the team improving as the Kings went 27–34–8 and finished in last place in the Western Conference. One day after the season ended, the Kings announced that they would not bring Desjardins back for the 2019–20 season.

On May 31, 2019, it was announced that Desjardins had been re-hired as head coach and general manager of the Medicine Hat Tigers.

== Personal life ==
Desjardins holds bachelor of education (BEd) and a master of social work (MSW) degrees. He and his wife, Rhonda, have two sons and a daughter.

== Head coaching record ==
=== WHL ===
Team	Year	Regular season								Playoffs
Team	Year	G	W	L	T	OTL	Pts	Pct	Division rank	Result
Saskatoon Blades	1997–98	39	10	23	6	–	26	.333	4th in East	Lost in 1st Round
Medicine Hat Tigers	2002–03	72	29	34	2	7	67	.465	3rd in Central	Lost in 2nd Round
Medicine Hat Tigers	2003–04	72	40	20	9	3	92	.639	1st in Central	Won Championship
Medicine Hat Tigers	2004–05	72	45	21	4	2	96	.667	1st in Central	Lost in 2nd Round
Medicine Hat Tigers	2005–06	72	47	16	–	9	103	.715	1st in Central	Lost in 3rd Round
Medicine Hat Tigers	2006–07	72	52	17	–	3	107	.743	1st in Central	Won Championship
Medicine Hat Tigers	2007–08	72	43	22	–	7	93	.646	3rd in Central	Lost in 1st Round
Medicine Hat Tigers	2008–09	72	36	29	–	7	79	.549	2nd in Central	Lost in 2nd Round
Medicine Hat Tigers	2009–10	72	41	23	–	8	90	.625	3rd in Central	Lost in 2nd Round
Medicine Hat Tigers	2019-20	63	41	19	-	3	85	.675	2nd in Central	Incomplete due to COVID-19 Pandemic
Medicine Hat Tigers	2020-21	23	14	8	-	1	29	.630	no standings (Note: The 2020–21 WHL regular season was shortened, started late, then was cancelled early, and no playoffs were held, due to the ongoing COVID-19 pandemic. The Medicine Hat Tigers were in a mathematical position to finish anywhere from 2nd to 4th in the Central Division when the season was cancelled.)	no playoffs
Medicine Hat Tigers	2021-22	68	11	53	-	3	26	.191	6th in Central	Missed Playoffs
Medicine Hat Tigers	2022-23	68	30	29	-	9	69	.507	4th in Central	Lost in 1st Round
Medicine Hat Tigers	2023-24	68	37	23	-	8	82	.667	2nd in Central	Lost in 1st Round
Medicine Hat Tigers	2024-25	68	47	17	-	4	98	.721	1st in Central	Won Championship
WHL totals		1000	540	362	21	76	1096	.540	5 Division Titles	12 Playoff Appearances 3 Championships

=== AHL ===
Team	Year	Regular season							Playoffs
Team	Year	G	W	L	OTL	Pts	Pct	Division rank	Result
Texas Stars	2012–13	76	43	22	11	97	.638	1st in South	Lost in 2nd Round
Texas Stars	2013–14	76	48	18	10	106	.697	1st in South	Won Calder Cup
AHL totals		152	91	40	21	203	.668	2 Division Titles	2 Playoff Appearances 1 Calder Cup

=== NHL ===
Team	Year	Regular season						Postseason			
Team	Year	G	W	L	OTL	Pts	Finish	W	L	Win%	Result
VAN	2014–15	82	48	29	5	101	2nd in Pacific	2	4	.333	Lost in First Round (Flames)
VAN	2015–16	82	31	38	13	75	6th in Pacific	—	—	—	Missed playoffs
VAN	2016–17	82	30	43	9	69	7th in Pacific	—	—	—	Missed playoffs
VAN total		246	109	110	27	245		2	4	.333	
LAK	2018–19	69	27	34	8	(71)	8th in Pacific	—	—	—	Missed playoffs
LAK total		69	27	34	8	71		—	—	–	
Total		315	136	144	35	307	.487	1 Playoff Appearance			

== Notes ==
Preceded by John Tortorella	Head coach of the Vancouver Canucks; 2014–2017	Succeeded by Travis Green
Preceded by John Stevens	Head coach of the Los Angeles Kings (interim); 2018–2019	Succeeded by Todd McLellan
