= Susan Scherer =

Canadian ice hockey player

Olympic medal record

IIHF World Women's Championships
Gold medal – first place	1992 Finland	Tournament
Gold medal – first place	1990 Canada	Tournament

Sue Scherer (born August 27, 1956) played for the Canadian National women's ice hockey team from 1989 to 1992. Scherer was a team member on Canada's National Team in two sports, ice hockey and softball.

== Playing career ==
The Kitchener native was a catcher in softball. She was part of the Canadian national softball team that took fourth in the World Championships in New Zealand in 1986 and fifth at the World Championships in Taiwan in 1982. Scherer also competed with the softball team at the Pan American Games. At the Pan Am games, she won gold in 1981 and 1983, and bronze in 1987.

In ice hockey, she was team captain for Canada at the 1990 World Championships. She would play for Canada again in 1992 and claim another gold.

== Coaching ==
From 1993 to 1996, Scherer was the head coach for the Guelph Gryphons women's ice hockey program. One of her players was Cassie Campbell.

== Career statistics ==
=== International ===
Year	Team	Event	Result	GP	G	A	Pts	PIM
1990	Canada	WC	1st place, gold medalist(s)	5	2	5	7	2

== Awards and honours ==
- Letterwinner, Guelph Hockey, 1983–84
- Johnny F. Bassett Memorial Award
- OWIAA All-Star selection, 1982–83
- OWIAA All-Star selection, 1983–84
- Softball Canada Hall of Fame in 1997.
- University of Guelph's Hall of Fame 1991
- Waterloo Region Hall of Fame
