= 1986 Abby Hoffman Cup =

Canadian ice hockey championship trophy

Tournament details
- Venue: Civic Centre
- Dates: March 20–23, 1986
- Teams: 10

Final positions
- Champions: Hamilton Golden Hawks (1st title)
- Runners-up: Maidstone Saskies
- Third place: Edmonton Chimos

Tournament statistics
- Games played: 29

Awards
- MVP: Linda DeAngelis (Hamilton)

The 1986 Abby Hoffman Cup was the fifth staging of Hockey Canada's women's national championships (at the time known as the Shoppers Drug Mart Women's National Hockey Championships). The four-day competition was played in North Battleford, Saskatchewan. The Hamilton Golden Hawks won the Abby Hoffman Cup for the first time a 7–2 victory over the Maidstone Saskies.

In the final game, Angela James scored a hat trick for the winners. Captain Linda DeAngelis was named the tournament's most valuable player.

== Teams participating ==
- Surrey Flyers, British Columbia
- Edmonton Chimos, Alberta (Host)
- Maidstone Saskies, Saskatchewan
- Winnipeg Canadian Polish AC, Manitoba
- Hamilton Golden Hawks, Ontario
- St-Hyacinthe, Québec
- UNB Red Blazers, New Brunswick
- PEI Island Whitecaps, Prince Edward Island
- Acadia Axettes, Nova Scotia
- Newfoundland All-Stars, Newfoundland and Labrador
