= Tina Cardinale-Beauchemin =

American ice hockey player (born 1966)

- Born: October 20, 1966 (age 59) Hudson, Massachusetts, U.S.
- Height: 5 ft 7 in (170 cm)
- Weight: 150 lb (68 kg; 10 st 10 lb)
- Position: Forward
- Shot: Right
- National team: United States
- Playing career: 1984–1992
Medal record
Women's ice hockey
IIHF World Women's Championships
Silver medal – second place	1990 Canada	Tournament
Silver medal – second place	1992 Finland	Tournament

Tina Cardinale-Beauchemin (née Beauchemin, previously Cardinale; born October 20, 1966) is an American retired ice hockey forward who was the captain of the first-ever United States women's national hockey team during the 1990 IIHF Women's World Championship and a member of the American national team at the 1992 IIHF Women's World Championship.

== Early life ==
Born in Hudson, Massachusetts, Cardinale-Beauchemin played soccer, basketball, and softball at Assabet Valley Regional Technical High School. Girls ice hockey was not offered at the school, so she played in neighborhood youth leagues.

== Career ==
During her first season as a member of the Northeastern Huskies women's ice hockey team, Cardinale scored 19 goals with 13 assists for 32 points. In her sophomore season she scored 15 goals and 20 assists for 35 points. Her junior season she was named an ECAC All-Star she scored 18 goals and 30 assists for 48 points.

Cardinale saved her best effort for her senior season where Northeastern went 26-0-1 and she scored 18 goals and 41 assists for 59 points. Cardinale was named an Eastern College Athletic Conference (ECAC) All-Star for the second time. Cardinale-Beauchemin is a member of the Northeastern University athletics Hall of Fame.

=== International ===
Year	Team	Event	Result	GP	G	A	Pts	PIM
1990	USA	WC	2nd place, silver medalist(s)	5	-	-	-	-
