= 1987 World Women's Hockey Tournament =

International ice hockey competition

Tournament details
- Host country: Canada
- Venue: 1 (in 1 host city)
- Dates: April 21–26, 1987
- Opened by: Jeanne Sauvé
- Teams: 7

Final positions
- Champions: Canada
- Runners-up: Ontario
- Third place: United States
- Fourth place: Sweden

Tournament statistics
- Games played: 27
- Goals scored: 247 (9.15 per game)
- Scoring leader: France Saint-Louis (CAN)

Awards
- MVP: Dawn McGuire (CAN)

The 1987 World Women's Hockey Tournament was held April 21–26, 1987, in North York, Toronto, Ontario. It was the first major world tournament for national women's ice hockey teams and was the first unofficial tournament before the International Ice Hockey Federation (IIHF) launched the Women's World Championship in 1990. The Ontario Women's Hockey Association (OWHA) hosted the tournament and director Fran Rider is credited as the driving force behind the event's success. The six-day tournament was held at the North York Centennial Arena, now called the Carnegie Centennial Centre.

Delegates from the participating nations and five additional countries met during the tournament to establish a strategy to lobby the International Ice Hockey Federation for the creation of a Women's World Championship. The success of the tournament and the positive reports presented to the IIHF gave women's ice hockey the legitimacy needed to pave the way for the creation of the modern Women's World Championship.

Team Canada won the tournament defeating Team Ontario by 4–0 in the final game. The championship trophy was named the Hazel McCallion World Cup, in honor of Mississauga mayor and women's ice hockey advocate Hazel McCallion.

== Teams ==
The following teams played at the tournament. It is assumed that these teams were selected on an invitational basis, but that is not confirmed.

- Canada
- Netherlands
- Japan
- Ontario
- Switzerland
- Sweden
- United States

West Germany was scheduled to participate but pulled out shortly before the tournament, possibly due to displeasure with the choice to not allow body checking.

The Swedish team was able to travel to and participate in the tournament because of the sponsorship of Toronto Maple Leafs defenceman, Börje Salming.

== Venue ==
The six-day tournament was held at the North York Centennial Arena, now called the Carnegie Centennial Centre.

Toronto, Canada
| Host Venue | Details |
|---|---|
| North York Centennial Arena Carnegie Centennial Centre, 2019 (North York Centennial Arena) | Location: (Canada) Toronto, Canada; Built: 1966, North York Centennial Arena; Renamed: May 2, 2001, Carnegie Centennial Centre, for Herb Carnegie; Capacity: |

== Format ==
The seven participating teams played in a single round robin tournament format. The top four teams from the group proceeded to the Medal Round, while the remaining teams played in the placement games.

Games were 45 minutes long, three periods of fifteen minutes each.

== Group stage ==
=== Round robin ===
==== Standings ====
| Pos | Team | Pld | W | D | L | GF | GA | GD | Pts | Qualification |
|---|---|---|---|---|---|---|---|---|---|---|
| 1 | Canada | 6 | 6 | 0 | 0 | 51 | 2 | +49 | 12 | Advanced to Medal round |
| 2 | United States | 6 | 5 | 0 | 1 | 64 | 5 | +59 | 10 | Advanced to Medal round |
| 3 | Ontario | 6 | 4 | 0 | 2 | 59 | 9 | +50 | 8 | Advanced to Medal round |
| 4 | Sweden | 6 | 3 | 0 | 3 | 13 | 22 | −9 | 6 | Advanced to Medal round |
| 5 | Switzerland | 6 | 2 | 0 | 4 | 12 | 49 | −37 | 4 | Sent to Placing round |
| 6 | Japan | 6 | 1 | 0 | 5 | 9 | 52 | −43 | 2 | Sent to Placing round |
| 7 | Netherlands | 6 | 0 | 0 | 6 | 6 | 75 | −69 | 0 | Sent to Placing round |

==== Results ====
| April 21, 1987 | Canada | 10 – 0 | Switzerland | North York, Canada |

| April 21, 1987 | Netherlands | 2 – 5 | Japan | North York, Canada |

| April 21, 1987 | Ontario | 8 – 0 | Sweden | North York, Canada |

| April 21, 1987 | Canada | 2 – 1 | United States | North York, Canada |

| April 22, 1987 | Ontario | 16 – 0 | Switzerland | North York, Canada |

| April 22, 1987 | Canada | 11 – 0 | Japan | North York, Canada |

| April 22, 1987 | Sweden | 0 – 10 | United States | North York, Canada |

| April 22, 1987 | Ontario | 19 – 0 | Netherlands | North York, Canada |

| April 23, 1987 | Japan | 4 – 6 | Switzerland | North York, Canada |

| April 23, 1987 | Canada | 19 – 1 | Netherlands | North York, Canada |

| April 23, 1987 | Switzerland | 0 – 3 | Sweden | North York, Canada |

| April 23, 1987 | Ontario | 14 – 0 | Japan | Port Credit, Canada |

| April 23, 1987 | United States | 20 – 0 | Netherlands | North York, Canada |

| April 24, 1987 | Japan | 0 – 16 | United States | North York, Canada |

| April 24, 1987 | Sweden | 7 – 0 | Netherlands | North York, Canada |

| April 24, 1987 | Canada | 5 – 0 | Ontario | North York, Canada |

| April 24, 1987 | United States | 13 – 1 | Switzerland | North York, Canada |

| April 25, 1987 | Canada | 4 – 0 | Sweden | North York, Canada |

| April 25, 1987 | Switzerland | 5 – 3 | Netherlands | North York, Canada |

| April 25, 1987 | Japan | 0 – 3 | Sweden | North York, Canada |

| April 25, 1987 | United States | 4 – 2 | Ontario | North York, Canada |

== Playoff stage ==
=== Placing Round ===
| April 25, 1987 | Japan | 4 – 0 | Netherlands | North York, Canada |

=== 5th/6th-place game ===
| April 26, 1987 | Switzerland | 4 – 0 | Japan | North York, Canada |

=== Medal round ===
Semi-finals
25 April – North York
Canada | 8
Sweden | 2
25 April - North York
United States | 4
Ontario | 5

Final
26 April – North York
Canada | 4
Ontario | 0
Third place
26 April - North York
United States | 5
Sweden | 0

=== Semi-finals ===
| April 25, 1987 | Canada | 8 – 2 | Sweden | North York, Canada |

| April 25, 1987 | United States | 4 – 5 | Ontario | North York, Canada |

=== Bronze-medal game ===
| April 26, 1987 | United States | 5 – 0 | Sweden | North York, Canada |

=== Final ===
| April 26, 1987 | Canada | 4 – 0 | Ontario | North York, Canada |

== Champions ==
1987 Women's World Tournament winners

Canada
1st title

== Final standings ==
| Rk. | Team |
|---|---|
| 1st place, gold medalist(s) | Canada |
| 2nd place, silver medalist(s) | Ontario |
| 3rd place, bronze medalist(s) | United States |
| 4. | Sweden |
| 5. | Switzerland |
| 6. | Japan |
| 7. | Netherlands |

== Awards ==
| Award | Player | Team |
|---|---|---|
| Most Valuable Player | Dawn McGuire | Canada |
| Best Goalkeeper | Cathy Phillips | Canada |
| Best Defenceman | Dawn McGuire | Canada |
| Best Forward | France Saint-Louis | Canada |
| Fair-Play Player | Cindy Curley | United States |
| Fair-Play Team | – | Japan |
