= Cindy Curley =

American ice hockey player, coach, and executive

- Hockey Hall of Fame, 2026
- Born: November 12, 1963 (age 62) Stow, Massachusetts, United States
- Height: 5 ft 5 in (165 cm)
- Weight: 141 lb (64 kg; 10 st 1 lb)
- Position: Forward
- Shot: Left
- Played for: Providence College; US Women's National Team
- National team: United States
- Playing career: 1981–1996
Medal record
Women's ice hockey
World Championship
Silver medal – second place	1990 Ottawa
Silver medal – second place	1992 Tampere
Silver medal – second place	1994 Lake Placid

Cindy Curley (born November 12, 1963) is an American former professional ice hockey forward, executive and ice hockey coach. Curley excelled for Providence College from 1981 to 1985, collecting over 200 points in four years. Curley played internationally for the United States women's national ice hockey team, beginning in 1987 with the first women's hockey team to represent the nation in international competition with the 1987 World Women's Hockey Tournament. She would play for the United States for the inaugural 1990 IIHF Women's World Championship and ultimately played for the United States team until 1995.

Since retiring from play, she served a variety of positions for USA Hockey from 1995 to 2008, which included serving as member of the Olympic Athlete Advisory Committee. She later served as general manager of Orchard Hills Athletic Club. She was inducted into the United States Hockey Hall of Fame in 2013, and the Hockey Hall of Fame in 2026.

== Early life ==
Curley is the daughter of Eugene F. "Geno" Curley and Elinor R. (Case) Curley. Curley's father played college ice hockey and her brothers also played ice hockey and Cindy learned to play as well. She chose Bobby Clarke as her hockey idol.. She cultivated her skills further with the Assabet Valley girls' hockey team.

== Playing career ==
Curley played in college for the Providence College Friars from 1981 to 1985. She scored 110 goals, 115 assists for a total of 225 points. She led her team in goals and points in 1984–85, her senior season. After college, she played for the Assabet Valley women's team, which played in US tournaments.

In 1987, Curley tried out and was selected for the US women's hockey national team. Curley played on the US team in the unofficial championship of 1987. Curley played in the inaugural official 1990 IIHF Women's World Championship in Ottawa, Ontario, Canada. In five games, she scored 11 goals and 12 assists for 23 points to lead the tournament in scoring. Her 23 points remain the record for a single tournament. Curley returned for the 1992 and 1994 championships. The United States won silver at the 1990, 1992 and 1994 world championships. Curley was captain of the US national women's team from 1989 to 1996. Curley had several knee surgeries and retired from active play in 1994. Curley took up coaching of an under-19 girls' team and joined the board of USA Hockey and later the US Hockey Olympic Advisory Committee.

== Career statistics ==
=== International ===
Year	Team	Event	Result	GP	G	A	Pts	PIM
1990	USA	WC	2nd place, silver medalist(s)	5	11	12	23	2

== Awards ==
- Massachusetts Hockey Hall of Fame (2002)
- Providence College Hockey Hall of Fame (2013)
- U.S. Hockey Hall of Fame
- All-Star – 1990 IIHF World Women's Championship
