= Melody Davidson =

Canadian ice hockey coach

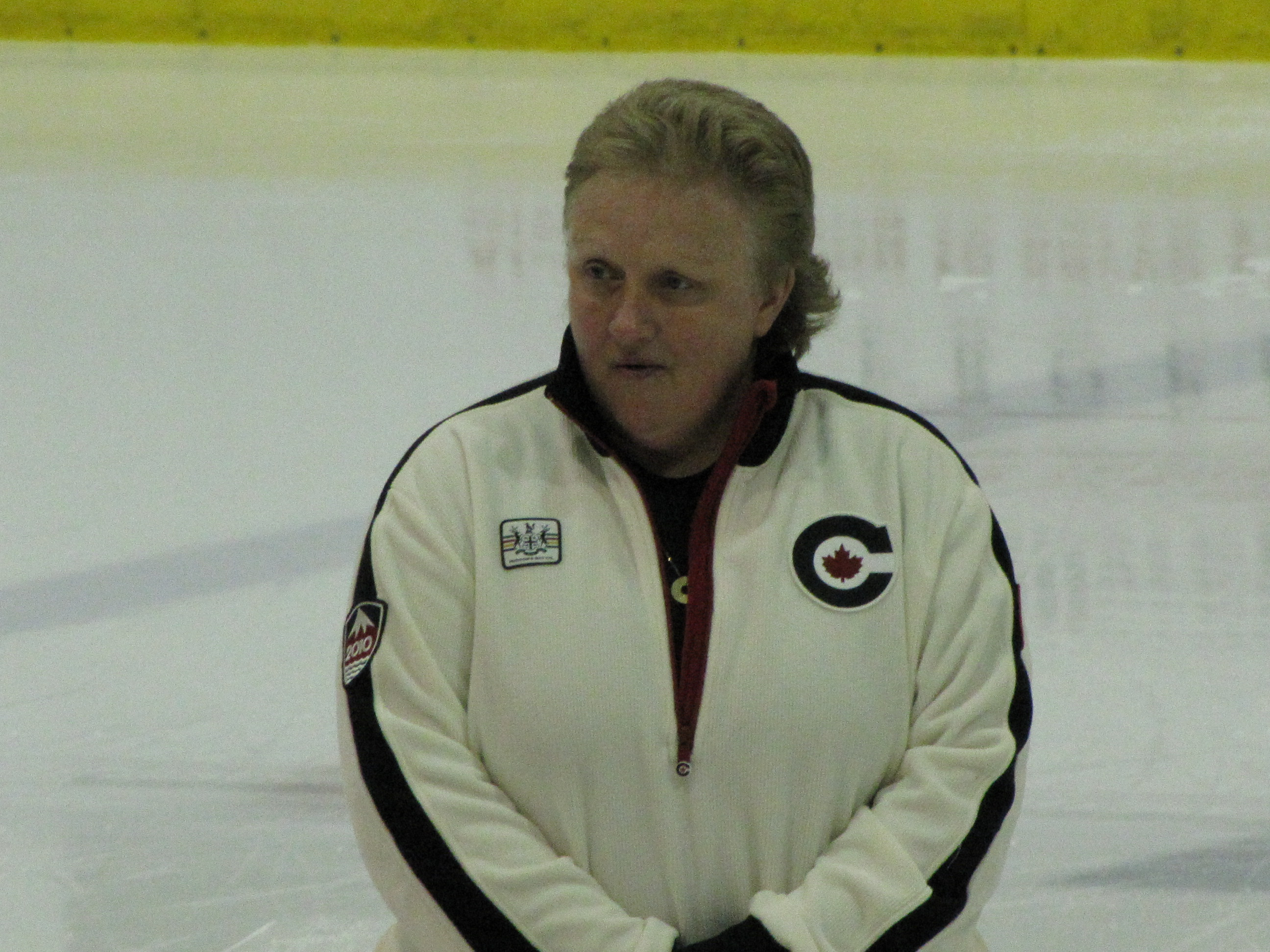
- Davidson in 2010
- Born: 1962 or 1963 (age 62–63); Coronation, Alberta, Canada
- Education: Red Deer College; University of Alberta
- Occupation: Ice hockey coach
- Awards: IIHF Hall of Fame (2024)

Melody Davidson (born 1962 or 1963) is a Canadian ice hockey coach. She served as head coach of the Canada women's national ice hockey team, leading them to a gold medal at the 2006 Winter Olympics and 2010 Winter Olympics. A graduate of the University of Alberta, she was also the head coach of the Cornell Big Red women's ice hockey team. Previously the head coach of the Connecticut College Camels women's ice hockey team. Davidson was inducted into the IIHF Hall of Fame in 2024.

== Early life and education ==
Davidson was born in Coronation, Alberta but moved to Oyen, Alberta after grade 3. After high school, she attended Red Deer College, where she earned a degree in physical education, and the University of Alberta (U of A). With her bachelor's degree, Davidson accepted a position as a recreation director before attending the National Coaching Institute at the University of Calgary.

== Career ==
Davidson began coaching her brothers hockey team in 1978 and eventually graduated to women's hockey in 1989. As a coach, she led Team Alberta at the 1991, 1995 and 1999 Canada Winter Games. As a result, she was asked to be an assistant coach for the Canadian national women's hockey team at the 2002 Winter Olympics. After her Olympic Games experience where Team Canada won gold, she had caught the attention of Cornell University who offered her a coaching position.

As head coach at Cornell, she was appointed Head Coach of Team Canada for the 2004–2005 season, the 2006 Winter Olympics, where Canada won another gold medal, and at the 2010 Winter Olympics. Her role in the Olympics earned her various honours including being inducted into the Alberta Sports Hall of Fame and the Canadian Olympic Hall of Fame. She was also awarded the 2010 Jack Donohue Coach of the Year Award and named to the Canadian Association for the Advancement of Women and Sport and Physical Activity's most influential women list. Subsequently she served as director of the Canadian women's team that won gold at the 2014 Sochi Winter Olympics. She was inducted into the builder category of the IIHF Hall of Fame at the medal ceremony of the 2024 IIHF World Championship.

== Coaching record ==
=== Cornell University ===
Year	Wins	Losses	Ties	Postseason
2004–05	3	22	3	
2003–04	7	21	2	
2002–03	4	21	2	

== Managerial ==
On July 26, 2018, it was announced that Gina Kingsbury would take over Davidson's role as General Manager of the Canada women's national ice hockey team at Hockey Canada. Davidson stated that she left the position after eight years to focus on scouting.

In 2022 she joined the professional women's Premier Hockey Federation as director of league and hockey operations.
