= Cathy Phillips =

Canadian ice hockey player

- Born: August 7, 1960 (age 66) Burlington, Ontario, Canada
- Height: 5 ft 7 in (170 cm)
- Weight: 143 lb (65 kg; 10 st 3 lb)
- Position: Goaltender
- National team: Canada
- Playing career: 1973–1990
Medal record
Women's ice hockey
Representing Canada
World Championship
Gold medal – first place	1990 Canada
World Tournament (unofficial)
Gold medal – first place	1987 Canada

Cathy Phillips (born August 7, 1960) is a Canadian retired ice hockey player and coach. A seventeen-season goaltender in the Central Ontario Women's Hockey League (COWHL), she also played with the Canadian women's national ice hockey team. Phillips won gold medals at the first Canadian Women's Hockey Nationals in 1982, the first World Women's Hockey Tournament in 1987 (also known as the 'Unofficial Women's Worlds'), and at the first IIHF Women's World Championship in 1990.

== Playing career ==
Phillips grew up in Burlington, Ontario and attended Burlington Central High School, where she participated in both basketball and track and field. However, her primary athletic interests were ice hockey and fastball, which she played with local Burlington community teams.

Her senior-level club ice hockey career began at age 13, at which time she began playing in the Central Ontario Women's Hockey League (COWHL), the predecessor of the National Women's Hockey League (1999–2007) and the Canadian Women's Hockey League (CWHL; 2007–2019). She played with teams in both Hamilton and Burlington. Phillips was the most distinguished net-minder to ever play in the COWHL, during her seventeen seasons in the league she was voted top goaltender fourteen times and COWHL Most Valuable Player (MVP) twice. Her highest goals against average (GAA) in a season was just 1.78 and she posted a season GAA below 1.00 three times.

At the inaugural Canadian Women's Hockey Nationals (also called the Esso Women's Hockey Nationals) in 1982, Phillips was the gold medal winning goaltender. Playing with Team Ontario, she held Team Alberta to a tie in regulation, allowing Ontario to claim victory in overtime. She went on to play in the subsequent six tournaments, collecting a total of four gold medals, one silver, and two bronze while representing Ontario.

=== International play ===
In 1987, Phillips was selected to represent Canada at the World Women's Hockey Tournament, the first international tournament ever held for national women's ice hockey teams. The tournament was hosted by the Ontario Women's Hockey Association and was the only one of its kind to be held before the International Ice Hockey Federation (IIHF) established the Women's World Championship in 1990. Because the 1987 tournament was not administrated by the IIHF, it is often referred to as "unofficial," with the 1990 Women's World Championship deemed the first "official" tournament. Phillips was outstanding in net for Team Canada and was named Best Goaltender of the tournament for her play.

She also played for Canada at the first IIHF World Championship in 1990.

== Career statistics ==
Year	Team	Event	Result	GP	W	L	T/OT	MIN	GA	SO	GAA	SV%
1990	Canada	WC	1st place, gold medalist(s)	5	-	-	-	156:00	3	-	1.15	0.906

== Coaching career ==
After she stopped playing, Phillips secured her Advanced Level coaching certification. In later years, she has served as an Assistant Coach to the gold medal winning Ontario Women's Hockey Association team at the 1995 Canada Winter Games.

Phillips battled back from her illness and spent many years coaching at various levels throughout the world of international women's ice hockey. She continues to volunteer and speak at local, national, and international venues, all in the interest of spreading the popularity of women's hockey around the world. Phillips continues to play as a goalie at the recreational level today.

== Awards and honours ==
Award / Honour	Year
International
World Tournament Best Goaltender	1987
World Tournament Gold Medal	1987
World Championship Gold Medal	1990
Canada
Canada Winter Games Gold Medal	1995 (Head coach)
Isobel Gathorne-Hardy Award	2005
Female Breakthrough Award	2009
Central Ontario Women's Hockey League
COWHL Top Goaltender	x14
COWHL MVP	x2
Other
Hockey sweater hangs at the Hockey Hall of Fame	1992
