= 1982 Abby Hoffman Cup =

Canadian ice hockey championship trophy

Tournament details
- Venue: Brantford Civic Centre
- Dates: April 1–4, 1982
- Teams: 10

Final positions
- Champions: Agincourt Canadians (1st title)
- Runners-up: Edmonton Chimos

Tournament statistics
- Games played: 29

Awards
- MVP: Dawn McGuire

The 1982 Abby Hoffman Cup was the first staging of Hockey Canada's women's national championships (at the time known as the Shoppers Drug Mart Women's National Hockey Championships). Ontario's Agincourt Canadians won the Abby Hoffman Cup after a 3–2 win over Alberta's Edmonton Chimos.

In the final game, Agincourt's Lynda Harley scored the overtime winner on a rebound.

== Teams participating ==
- Surrey Flyers, British Columbia
- Edmonton Chimos, Alberta
- University of Saskatchewan
- Winnipeg, Manitoba
- Agincourt Canadians, Ontario
- Titan de Montréal, Quebec
- University of New Brunswick
- Prince Edward Island Supdettes
- Saint Mary's University, Nova Scotia
- St. John's Chargers, Newfoundland and Labrador
