= 1984 Abby Hoffman Cup =

Canadian ice hockey championship trophy

Tournament details
- Venue: Spruce Grove Agrena
- Dates: March 22–25, 1984
- Teams: 10

Final positions
- Champions: Edmonton Chimos (1st title)
- Runners-up: Nettoyeur Seyer de St-Hyacinthe
- Third place: Hamilton Golden Hawks

Tournament statistics
- Games played: 29

Awards
- MVP: Shirley Cameron

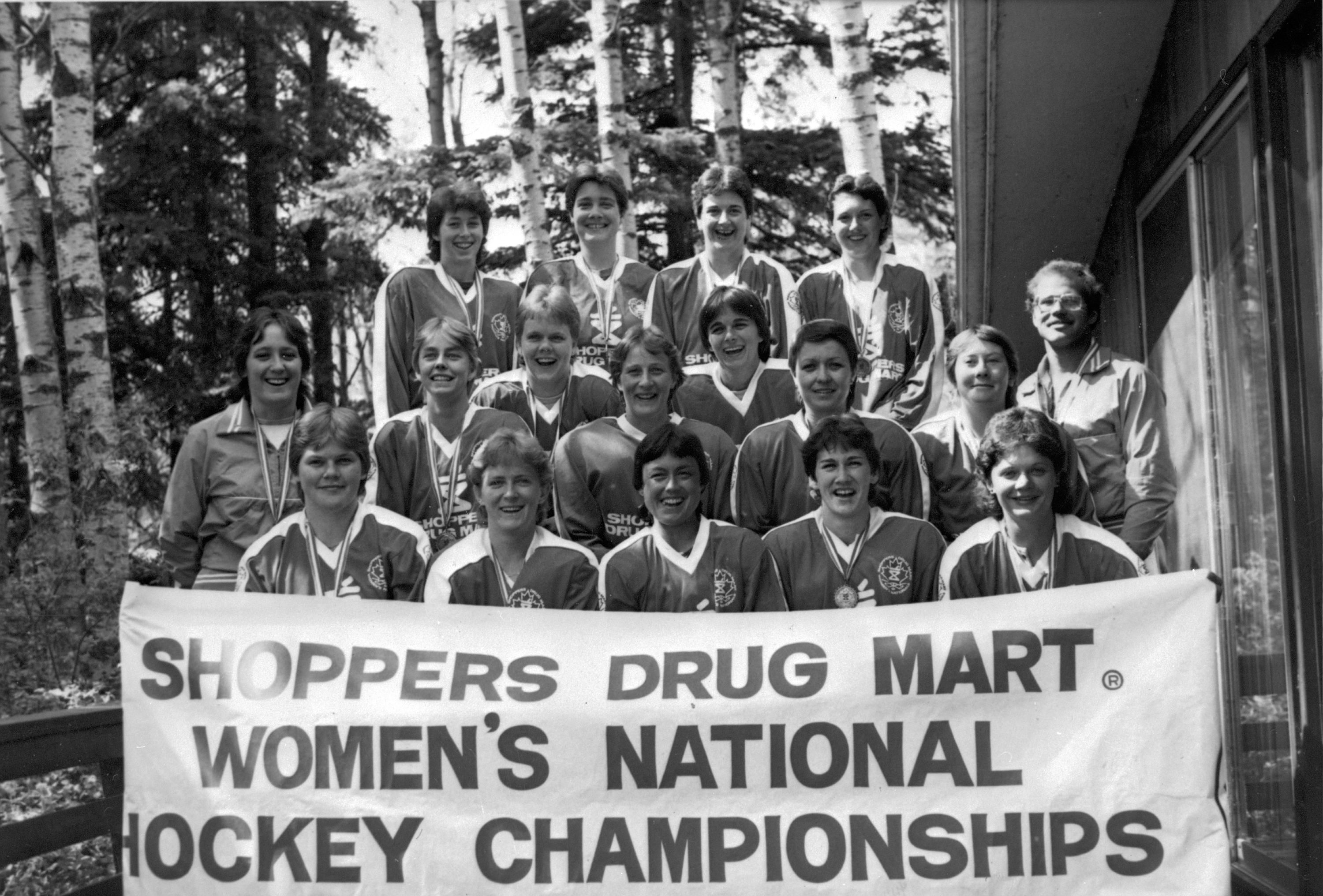
Edmonton Chimos won their first national title in 1984

The 1984 Abby Hoffman Cup was the third staging of Hockey Canada's women's national championships (at the time known as the Shoppers Drug Mart Women's National Hockey Championships). The four-day competition was played in Spruce Grove, Alberta. The Edmonton Chimos won the Abby Hoffman Cup after a 5–4 win over Quebec's Nettoyeur Seyer de St-Hyacinthe.

In the final game, Edmonton's Kathy Berg scored the overtime winner.

== Teams participating ==
- North Vancouver Goofey's Canadians, British Columbia
- Edmonton Chimos, Alberta
- Maidstone Saskies, Saskatchewan
- Winnipeg Canadian Polish AC, Manitoba
- Hamilton Golden Hawks, Ontario
- Nettoyeur Seyer de St-Hyacinthe, Quebec
- University of New Brunswick
- Prince Edward Island Supdettes
- Dalhousie Tigerettes, Nova Scotia
- St. John's All-Stars, Newfoundland and Labrador
