= Dan Church =

Canadian ice hockey coach and executive

Dan Church (born May 14, 1973) is a Canadian ice hockey coach and executive. He was head coach of the Canadian national women's hockey team, which won the gold medal at the 2012 IIHF Women's World Championship. He is also the head coach for the York Lions women's ice hockey program.

== University ==
From 1996 to 2004, Church was the assistant coach for the Toronto Lady Blues ice hockey program. Under his tenure, the Lady Blues claimed one CIAU (now CIS) national championship (2001) and three OUA championships (1998, 2000, 2001). While at the University of Toronto, he was the assistant to Karen Hughes (who was also the National Women's Team head coach). In 2004, Church was appointed head coach for York University.

== Hockey Canada ==
In August 2006, Church was appointed assistant coach with the Canadian National Women's Under-22 Team. The squad participated in a three-game series versus the United States in Ottawa, Ontario. At the 2008 Air Canada Cup (now known as Meco Cup), Church was appointed head coach of the Under 22 team, and helped the Canadian squad claim the gold medal. During 2009, Church served Hockey Canada in two different capacities. He served as Canada's head coach at the 2009 World University Games in Harbin, China. Women's ice hockey was contested for the first time, and Canada would claim the first-ever gold medal. In August 2009, Church was the head of the Canadian National Womnen's Under-18 team. The team participated in a three-game series versus the United States. The series was contested in Calgary, Alberta during August, 2009.

A few months later, Church coached the Canada's National Women's Under-18 Team at the 2010 IIHF World Women's Under-18 Championship (contested in Chicago, Illinois). The result was Canada winning a gold medal. In 2011, Church was the assistant coach with the Canadian National Women's Team, as they claimed a silver medal at the 2011 IIHF World Women's Championship. The following year, Church was appointed head coach of the National Team. On December 12, 2013, Church resigned from his position due to differences with Hockey Canada.

== Personal ==
Since 2007, Church has served as the President of the CIS Women's Hockey Coaches Association. Church has also provided coaching duties to the Canadian National Standing Amputee Program, and helped the program claim gold at the world championship in 2008 and 2010. Church is also a Canadian Professional Golf Association (CPGA) professional and has participated at various Canadian Tour competitions.

On April 17, 2012, Church, along with Meghan Agosta, Gillian Apps, Caroline Ouellette and Courtney Birchard, took part in the opening face off of the playoff game between the Ottawa Senators and the New York Rangers at ScotiaBank Place.
