= Perry Pearn =

Canadian ice hockey coach (born 1951)

- Born: June 6, 1951 (age 75); Stettler, Alberta, Canada
- Occupation: ice hockey coach

Perry Pearn (born June 6, 1951) is a Canadian professional ice hockey coach. He is the head coach of the China men's national team since 2024, and previously coached the Japan men's national team. He is a former assistant coach in the National Hockey League (NHL) from 1995 to 2017.

== Coaching career ==
Pearn, a native of Stettler, Alberta, was an assistant with the original incarnation of the Winnipeg Jets (1995–1996), Ottawa Senators (1996–2004), New York Rangers (2004–2009), Montreal Canadiens (2009–2011) and the current Jets (2012–2014). On August 11, 2014 he was hired as an assistant coach by the Vancouver Canucks. At the end of the 2016–2017 regular season, he was let go in the dismissal of head coach Willie Desjardins and fellow assistant Doug Lidster.

Pearn has also coached at the university and junior levels, including one season as head coach of the Medicine Hat Tigers of the Western Hockey League.

Pearn served twice as an assistant coach with Canada's national junior team at the IIHF World Junior Championships (1990, 1991). As head coach, he led Canada to gold in 1993.

Pearn has been inducted into four halls of fame—the Edmonton Sports Hall of Fame (1995), the Alberta Colleges Athletic Conference Hall of Fame (2014), the Alberta Hockey Hall of Fame (2017) and the Canadian Colleges Athletic Association Hall of Fame (2019).

In November 2022, Pearn became head coach of the Japan men's national ice hockey team and the Japan men's national junior ice hockey team.

In 2024, Pearn became the head coach of the China men's national ice hockey team.
