= 1985 Abby Hoffman Cup =

Canadian ice hockey championship trophy

Tournament details
- Venue: Summerside
- Dates: March 21–24, 1985
- Teams: 10

Final positions
- Champions: Edmonton Chimos (2nd title)
- Runners-up: Hamilton Golden Hawks
- Third place: Belvederes de Montréal

Tournament statistics
- Games played: 29

Awards
- MVP: Angela James (Hamilton)

The 1985 Abby Hoffman Cup was the fourth staging of Hockey Canada's women's national championships (at the time known as the Shoppers Drug Mart Women's National Hockey Championships). The four-day competition was played in Summerside, Prince Edward Island. The Edmonton Chimos won the Abby Hoffman Cup for the second year in a row, this time after a 4–3 win over the Hamilton Golden Hawks.

In the final game, Barbara Nugent scored the game winner in the third period. Hamilton's Angela James was named the tournament's most valuable player.

== Teams participating ==
- North Vancouver Canadians, British Columbia
- Edmonton Chimos, Alberta (Host)
- Maidstone Saskies, Saskatchewan
- Winnipeg Canadian Polish AC, Manitoba
- Hamilton Golden Hawks, Ontario
- Belvederes de Montréal, Québec
- UNB Red Blazers, New Brunswick
- PEI Spudettes, Prince Edward Island
- Dalhousie Tigerettes, Nova Scotia
- Newfoundland All-Stars, Newfoundland and Labrador
