= 1997 Abby Hoffman Cup =

Canadian ice hockey championship trophy

Tournament details
- Venue: Minoru Arena
- Dates: March 6–9, 1997
- Teams: 8

Final positions
- Champions: Edmonton Chimos (4th title)
- Runners-up: Équipe Québec
- Third place: North York Beatrice Aeros

Tournament statistics
- Games played: 20

Awards
- MVP: France St-Louis (Québec)

The 1997 Abby Hoffman Cup was the 16th staging of Hockey Canada's Esso Women's National Championships. The four-day competition was played in Richmond, British Columbia. Alberta's Edmonton Chimos won the Abby Hoffman Cup for the fourth time after a 3–2 win over Hockey Québec.

In the final game, Edmonton's Shelley Coolidge scored the winner in the third period.

== Teams participating ==
- Team BC
- Edmonton Chimos, Alberta
- Team Saskatchewan
- Team Manitoba
- North York Beatrice Aeros, Ontario
- Équipe Québec
- Team NB
- Team Prince Edward Island
