= 1992 Abby Hoffman Cup =

Canadian ice hockey championship trophy

Tournament details
- Venue: Jasper Place Arena
- Dates: March 19–22, 1992
- Teams: 8

Final positions
- Champions: Edmonton Chimos (3rd title)
- Runners-up: Toronto Aeros
- Third place: Sherbrooke Christin Autos

Tournament statistics
- Games played: 20

Awards
- MVP: Geraldine Heaney (Aeros)

The 1992 Abby Hoffman Cup was the 11th staging of Hockey Canada's Women's National Championships. The four-day competition was played in Edmonton, Alberta. The host team Edmonton Chimos won the Abby Hoffman Cup for the third time after a 4–0 shutout win over Ontario's Toronto Aeros.

In the final game, goalie Shelleen Hyland posted the shutout while Sharon Holubowich scored the winner.

== Teams participating ==
- Surrey Flyers, British Columbia
- Edmonton Chimos, Alberta (Host)
- Calgary Chargers, Alberta
- Saskatchewan Saskies
- Manitoba
- Toronto Aeros, Ontario
- Sherbrooke Christin Autos, Québec
- New Brunswick
