= 1990 IIHF Women's World Championship =

Tournament details
- Host country: Canada
- Dates: 19–25 March 1990
- Opened by: Ray Hnatyshyn
- Teams: 8

Final positions
- Champions: Canada (1st title)
- Runners-up: United States
- Third place: Finland
- Fourth place: Sweden

Tournament statistics
- Games played: 20
- Goals scored: 237 (11.85 per game)
- Scoring leader: (United States) Cindy Curley (23 points)

The 1990 IIHF Women's World Championships was an international women's ice hockey competition held at Civic Centre in Ottawa, Ontario, Canada (now renamed TD Place Arena) from March 19 to 25, in 1990. This was the first IIHF-sanctioned international tournament in women's ice hockey and is the only major international tournament in women's ice hockey to allow bodychecking. Full contact bodychecking was allowed with certain restrictions near the boards. The intermissions between periods were twenty minutes instead of fifteen. This has since been changed to the usual fifteen minutes.

The Canadian team won the gold medal, the United States won silver, and Finland won bronze. Team Finland had won the first IIHF European Women’s Championship the previous year (1989), in Düsseldorf and Ratingen, Germany.

Canada's Fran Rider helped to organize the championships without the financial support from the Canadian Amateur Hockey Association (now known as Hockey Canada).

The tournament drew strong international attention. The gold medal game was attended by 8,784 people – at the time the largest ever audience for a women's hockey game – and drew over a million viewers on television. For marketing purposes, the Canadian Amateur Hockey Association decided the Canadian national team should wear pink and white uniforms instead of the expected red and white and released a related film called, "Pretty in Pink". While the experiment only lasted for this tournament, Ottawa was taken over by a "pink craze" during the championships. Restaurants had pink-coloured food on special, and pink became a popular colour for flowers and bow ties.

== Qualification tournament ==
The United States, Canadian and Asian representative Japan, qualified automatically. The 1989 European Women's Ice Hockey Championship served as the qualification tournament for this championship. The top five finishers in the top pool qualified. They were Finland, Norway, Sweden, Switzerland, and West Germany.

U.S. team members ranged in age from 17 to 30 and included high school and college players, a law student and a construction worker.

== Venue ==
The tournament took place in Canada at the Civic Centre in Ottawa, now renamed, TD Place Arena.

Ottawa, Canada
Host Venue	Details
Ottawa Civic Centre Renamed: TD Place Arena	Location: (Canada) Ottawa, Canada; Broke ground: 1966; Opened: December 29, 1967; Renamed: TD Place Arena; Renovated: 1992, 2005, 2012–2014; Expanded: 1992 (seating reduced as part of 2005 renovation) Capacity: 9,500 (standard); 10,585 (temporary)

== Final tournament ==
=== Group stage ===
==== Group A ====
Pos	Team	Pld	W	D	L	GF	GA	GD	Pts	Qualification
1	Canada	3	3	0	0	50	1	+49	6	Advanced to Final round
2	Sweden	3	2	0	1	19	19	0	4	Advanced to Final round
3	West Germany	3	1	0	2	4	25	−21	2	Sent to Consolation round
4	Japan	3	0	0	3	5	33	−28	0	Sent to Consolation round

Source: Hockey Canada

19 March 1990	Canada	15–1	Sweden

19 March 1990	West Germany	4–1	Japan

21 March 1990	Canada	17–0	West Germany

21 March 1990	Japan	4–11	Sweden

22 March 1990	Canada	18–0	Japan

22 March 1990	Sweden	7–0	West Germany

==== Group B ====
Pos	Team	Pld	W	D	L	GF	GA	GD	Pts	Qualification
1	United States	3	3	0	0	38	7	+31	6	Advanced to Final round
2	Finland	3	2	0	1	24	6	+18	4	Advanced to Final round
3	Switzerland	3	1	0	2	11	29	−18	2	Sent to Consolation round
4	Norway	3	0	0	3	4	35	−31	0	Sent to Consolation round

Source: Hockey Canada

19 March 1990	Norway	1–10	Finland

19 March 1990	United States	16–3	Switzerland

21 March 1990	United States	17–0	Norway

21 March 1990	Finland	10–0	Switzerland

22 March 1990	Switzerland	8–3	Norway

22 March 1990	Finland	4–5	United States

=== Consolation round ===
==== 5–8 place ====
24 March 1990	Switzerland	5–4	Japan

24 March 1990	Norway	6–3	West Germany

==== 7–8 place ====
25 March 1990	West Germany	9–2	Japan

==== 5–6 place ====
25 March 1990	Switzerland	7–6	Norway

=== Final round ===
==== Semifinals ====
24 March 1990	United States	10–3	Sweden

24 March 1990	Canada	6–5	Finland

==== 3–4 place ====
25 March 1990	Finland	6–3	Sweden

==== Final ====
25 March 1990	Canada	5–2	United States

== Rankings and statistics ==
=== Final rankings ===
1. Canada
2. United States
3. Finland
4. Sweden
5. Switzerland
6. Norway
7. West Germany
8. Japan

=== Scoring leaders ===
List shows the top ten skaters sorted by points, then goals.

	G	A	Pts
Cindy Curley, United States	11	12	23
Tina Cardinale, United States	5	10	15
Cammi Granato, United States	9	5	14
Kim Urech, Switzerland	8	6	14
Angela James, Canada	11	2	13
Heather Ginzel, Canada	7	5	12
Susana Yuen, Canada	5	7	12
Kelly O'Leary, United States	6	5	11
Shirley Cameron, Canada	5	6	11
Stacy Wilson, Canada	3	8	11

Canada's Dawn McGuire was named MVP of the gold medal game.

=== Leading goaltenders ===
Only the top five goaltenders, based on save percentage, who have played 40% of their team's minutes are included in this list.

Player	TOI	SA	GA	GAA	Sv%	SO
(Canada) Cathy Phillips	156	32	3	1.15	90.63	1
(Japan) Tamae Satsu	151	143	17	6.75	88.11	0
(United States) Kelly Dyer	200	83	12	3.60	85.54	1
(West Germany) Aurelia Vonderstrass	180	65	10	3.33	84.62	0
(Switzerland) Tanja Muller	147	97	15	6.12	84.54	0

TOI = Time On Ice (minutes:seconds); SA = Shots against; GA = Goals against; GAA = Goals against average; Sv% = Save percentage; SO = Shutouts
Source: whockey.com

== Bodychecking ==
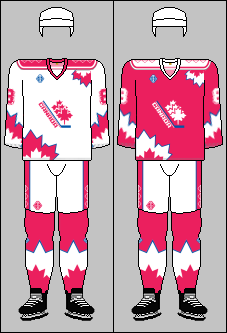
1990 women's team jerseys for Team Canada

This is the only major international tournament in women's ice hockey to allow bodychecking. Bodychecking rules allowed for full-contact checking, with certain limitations along the boards.

Before the tournament, bodychecking had been allowed in women's ice hockey in Europe and North America though Canada had begun to gradually eliminate the tactic from their women's ice hockey programs in the mid-1980's, with contact having already been banned at all national women's ice hockey tournaments in Canada in 1983 due to the efforts of Rhonda Leeman Taylor. However, the European teams had asked for bodychecking to be included in the 1990 international tournament.

[Cammi] Granato said that the women's game, "without the checking, can't get too out of hand." She recalled how, in the 1990 world championships, checking was allowed for the first few games and the Americans looked forward to it. "We were psyched," Granato said. "Then we faced some of the European teams and said, 'Wow, these guys are strong and they know how to hit.' There were a couple head injuries right away and they took it out. There is too much of a size difference. It was kind of a trial and error. And then they took it out entirely."

— Joe Lapointe, "OLYMPICS: WOMEN'S HOCKEY; Contact Is a Hard-Hitting Question to Consider", The New York Times (Feb. 17, 2002)

After this tournament, the International Ice Hockey Federation disallowed bodychecking in women's ice hockey. It is currently an infraction punished with a minor or major and game misconduct penalty.

== Injuries ==
A number of players suffered head injuries from the beginning of the tournament. Finland's Kirsi Hirvonen was "carried away with a neck injury after being cross-checked." U.S. team captain Tina Cardinale-Beauchemin's right forearm and elbow, "were a mass of purple-and-blue welts, courtesy of a slash early in the tournament." Canada's France Saint-Louis, "spent three days in a hospital after taking a stick across the throat".

== Attendance ==
Precise attendance figures are not clear. The Globe and Mail in 2013 estimated that the total attendance was 13,000. However, it was reported that the gold medal game alone had a record 8,784 spectators, and that Canada's first game against Sweden had 3,578.

== Broadcasts ==
Television broadcasts of the event was produced by Paul Graham.

== See also ==
- IIHF Women's World Championship
