= 2009–10 Finland women's national ice hockey team =

2009–10 Finnish Ice Hockey Association women's ice hockey season

Olympic bronze medal Canada Cup bronze medal
- Conference: IIHF

Record
- Overall: 5-7-0

Coaches and captains
- Head coach: Pekka Hämäläinen
- Captain: Emma Laaksonen
- Alternate captain(s): Jenni Hiirikoski, Saara Tuominen

The 2009–10 Finland's women's national hockey team represented Finland at the 2010 Winter Olympics. Prior to the games, the team participated in various tournaments during the 2009-10 season. The team won the bronze medal at the 2010 Winter Olympics. The head coach is Pekka Hämäläinen.

== Schedule ==
=== 2009 Canada Cup ===
- All games were held at General Motors Place in Vancouver, British Columbia.

Date	Opponent	Time	Score
August 31, 2009	USA	15:00 PM	Win, 3-2
Sep 1, 2009	Canada	19:30 PM	Loss, 10-2
Sep 3, 2009	Sweden	15:00 PM	Loss, 3-1
Sep 5, 2009	USA (semi-final)	15:00 PM	Loss, 4-0
Sep 6, 2009	Sweden (bronze)	15:00 PM	Win, 2-1

=== 2009 4 Nations Cup ===
- All games were held in Finland.

Date	Opponent	Location	Time	Score
Nov 3, 2009	USA	Mikkeli	18:30 PM	Loss, 0-4
Nov 4, 2009	Canada	Kerava	18:30 PM	Loss, 2-4
Nov 5, 2009	Sweden	Helsinki	18:30 PM	Loss, 1-2 (OT)
Nov 7, 2009	Sweden (bronze-medal game)	Tikkurila	12:00 PM	Loss, 1-2 (SO)

=== USA Hockey Qwest Tour ===
Date	Opponent	Location	Time	Score
Feb. 4, 2010	USA	Colorado Springs, CO (World Arena)		Loss, 1-5

== Roster ==
Position	Name	Height	Weight	Birthdate	Birthplace	2009–10 team
G	Mira Kuisma	168	65	6 May 1987	Kuopio	(Finland) Oulun Kärpät
G	Noora Räty	164	68	29 May 1989	Espoo	(United States) 2009–10 Minnesota Golden Gophers women's ice hockey team
G	Anna Vanhatalo	178	65	29 February 1984	Helsinki	(Finland) Espoo Blues
D	Jenni Hiirikoski	161	60	30 March 1987	Lempäälä	(Finland) Ilves Tampere
D	Emma Laaksonen	159	59	17 December 1981	Washington, D.C., United States	(Finland) Espoo Blues
D	Rosa Lindstedt	186	78	24 January 1988	Ylöjärvi	(Finland) Ilves Tampere
D	Terhi Mertanen	166	68	4 April 1981	Joensuu	(Finland) Espoo Blues
D	Heidi Pelttari	166	69	2 August 1985	Tampere	(Finland) Ilves Tampere
D	Mariia Posa	164	58	21 February 1988	Hyvinkää	(United States) 2009–10 Minnesota-Duluth Bulldogs women's ice hockey season
D	Saija Sirviö	172	62	29 December 1982	Oulu	(Finland) Oulun Kärpät
F	Anne Helin	170	68	28 January 1987	Helsinki	(Finland) Oulun Kärpät
F	Venla Hovi	169	62	28 October 1987	Tampere	(Finland) Ilves Tampere
F	Michelle Karvinen	166	70	27 March 1990	Rødovre, Denmark	(Denmark) Rødovre
F	Anniina Rajahuhta	164	62	8 March 1989	Helsinki	(Finland) Ilves Tampere
F	Karoliina Rantamäki	163	65	23 February 1978	Espoo	(Russia) SKIF
F	Mari Saarinen	172	67	30 July 1981	Kangasala	(Finland) Ilves Tampere
F	Nina Tikkinen	170	67	6 February 1987	Salo	(United States) Minnesota State University, Mankato
F	Minnamari Tuominen	165	67	26 June 1990	Helsinki	(United States) 2009–10 Ohio State Buckeyes women's ice hockey season
F	Saara Tuominen	169	65	1 January 1986	Ylöjärvi	(United States) 2009–10 Minnesota-Duluth Bulldogs women's ice hockey season
F	Marjo Voutilainen	168	70	22 March 1981	Kuopio	(Finland) Espoo Blues
F	Linda Välimäki	165	62	31 May 1990	Ylöjärvi	(Finland) Ilves Tampere

== 2010 Olympics ==
Date	Opponent	Location	Time	Score
Feb. 14	Russia	UBC Thunderbird Arena	16:30 PM	Win, 5-1
Feb. 16	China	UBC Thunderbird Arena	19:00 PM	Win, 2-1
Feb. 18	USA	UBC Thunderbird Arena	14:30 PM	Loss, 0-6
Feb. 22	Canada	UBC Thunderbird Arena	17:00 PM	Loss, 0-5
Feb. 25	Sweden	Canada Hockey Place	17:00 PM	Win, 3-2 (OT)

In the bronze medal game, Karoliina Rantamäki scored in overtime as Finland beat Sweden 3-2. Heidi Pelttari and Michelle Karvinen also scored for Finland. Noora Rätyä made 16 saves for Finland, who led 2-1 after the second period. Rantamäki scored the winner just 2:33 into the overtime.

== Player stats ==
=== Skaters ===
Player	Goals	Assists	Points	Shots	PIM	+/-
Anne Helin	0	0	0	2	4	-4
Jenni Hiirikoski	0	1	1	9	5	-3
Venla Hovi	2	0	2	2	6	1
Michelle Karvinen	1	0	1	6	6	-1
Emma Laaksonen	0	0	0	5	4	-2
Rosa Lindstedt	0	1	1	0	5	-3
Terhi Mertanen	0	0	0	3	1	0
Heidi Pelttari	1	2	3	2	13	-4
Mariia Posa	0	0	0	0	3	-3
Annina Rajahuhta	0	0	0	0	0	-2
Karolina Rantamaki	2	0	2	6	3	-2
Mari Saarinen	0	0	0	2	6	2
Saija Sirviö	1	0	1	2	7	2
Nina Tikkinen	2	0	2	2	11	-3
Minnamari Tuominen	0	0	0	0	0	0
Saara Tuominen	0	1	1	1	12	-3
Linda Välimäki	0	1	1	9	12	-2
Marjo Voutilainen	1	0	1	0	10	-3

=== Goaltenders ===
Player	Games played	Minutes	Goals Aaainst	Wins	Losses	Shutouts	Save %	Goals against average
Mira Kuisma	0	0	0	0	0	0	0	.000
Noora Räty	5	302:33	15	3	2	0	88.5	3.00
Anna Vanhatalo	0	0	0	0	0	0	0	.000

== See also ==
- Finland women's national ice hockey team
- Women's Ice Hockey in Finland
- Finland women's national U-18 ice hockey team
