= 2010–11 Canada women's national ice hockey team =

The 2010–11 women's national hockey team represented Canada in various tournaments during the season. The team attempted to win the gold medal at the Women's World Championships. The head coach is former National Hockey League player Ryan Walter.

== National team ==
=== News and notes ===
- September 14: Four members of its 2010 Olympic gold medal-winning National Women's Team: Becky Kellar, Gina Kingsbury, Carla MacLeod and Colleen Sostorics have announced their retirements from international hockey.
- October 5, 2010: Tessa Bonhomme was one of several athletes selected to participate in an all-athletes episode of Wipeout Canada.
- March 15: Jennifer Botterill announces her retirement from international hockey. She was one of just four Canadian players to participate in the first four Olympic women's hockey tournaments. Her 184 games for Team Canada rank third all-time behind Hayley Wickenheiser and Jayna Hefford. She is fifth on the all-time scoring list with 65 goals and 109 assists for 174 points.

=== Four Nations Cup ===
- September 21: Former NHL player Ryan Walter has been named the head coach for Team Canada at the 2010 Four Nations Cup. Assisting Walter will be current Minnesota Duluth assistant coach Laura Schuler and Ryerson Rams head coach Stephanie White.

==== Roster ====
| Number | Name | Position | Height | Club |
| 1 | Shannon Szabados | Goaltender | 5'8 | Canada National team |
| 2 | Meghan Agosta | Forward | 5'7 | Canada National Team; Mercyhurst |
| 6 | Rebecca Johnston | Forward | 5'9 | Canada National Team |
| 7 | Cherie Piper | Forward | 5'6 | Canada National Team; Brampton Thunder |
| 8 | Annie Guay | Defence | 5'8 | Montreal Stars |
| 10 | Gillian Apps | Forward | 6'0 | Canada National Team; Brampton Thunder |
| 12 | Meghan Mikkelson | Defence | 5'9 | Canada National Team; Edmonton Chimos |
| 13 | Caroline Ouellette – A | Forward | 5'11 | Canada National Team; Montreal Stars |
| 14 | Courtney Birchard | Defence | 5'9 | New Hampshire |
| 15 | Tara Watchorn | Defence | 5'9 | Boston University |
| 16 | Jayna Hefford- A | Forward | 5'8 | Canada National Team; Brampton Thunder |
| 18 | Bobbi Jo Slusar | Defence | 5'4 | Strathmore Rockies |
| 19 | Brianne Jenner | Forward | 5'9 | Cornell Big Red |
| 20 | Jennifer Wakefield | Forward | 5'9.5 | Canada National Team; Boston University Terriers |
| 21 | Haley Irwin | Forward | 5'7 | Canada National Team; Minnesota Duluth |
| 22 | Hayley Wickenheiser- C | Forward | 5'10 | Canada National Team |
| 23 | Jocelyne Larocque | Defence | 5'6 | Minnesota Duluth |
| 24 | Natalie Spooner | Forward | 5'9 | Ohio State |
| 25 | Tessa Bonhomme- A | Defence | 5'7 | Canada National Team; Toronto CWHL |
| 26 | Sarah Vaillancourt | Forward | 5'5 | Canada National Team; Montreal Stars |
| 28 | Vicki Bendus | Forward | 5'2 | Mercyhurst |
| 29 | Marie-Philip Poulin | Forward | 5'6 | Canada National Team; Boston University |
| 30 | Christina Kessler | Goaltender | 5'6 | Burlington Barracudas |
| 33 | Kim St. Pierre | Goaltender | 5'9 | Canada National Team; Montreal Stars |

==== Schedule ====
| Date | Teams | Location | Time | Score | Goal scorers |
| Tues Nov 9 | USA vs. Canada | St. John's, Newfoundland | 7:30 pm | USA 3–2 Canada (Shootout) | US: Jenny Potter, Meghan Duggan; Can: Marie-Philip Poulin, Meaghan Mikkelson |
| Wed Nov 10 | Sweden vs. Canada | Clarenville, Newfoundland | 7 pm | Canada 8–1 Sweden | Can: Natalie Spooner (3), Haley Irwin, Rebecca Johnston (2), Vicki Bendus, Meaghan Mikkelson; Swe: Therése Sjolander |
| Fri Nov 12 | Canada vs. Finland | St. John's, Nfld | 7:30 pm | Canada 15–0 Finland | Meghan Agosta, Meaghan Mikkelson, Marie-Philip Poulin (3), Jennifer Wakefield (2), Jayna Hefford, Caroline Ouellette, Hayley Wickenheiser, Haley Irwin (2), Vicki Bendus, Cherie Piper, Natalie Spooner |
| Sat Nov 13 | Canada vs. USA Gold Medal Game | St. John's, Nfld | 7:30 pm | Canada 3–2 USA (OT) | Rebecca Johnston(2), Meaghan Mikkelson |

=== IIHF World championships ===
Canada will attempt to win the gold medal as they compete in the 2011 Women's World Ice Hockey Championships in Switzerland. A total of 37 players were invited to the selection training camp, which takes place from April 2 to 5 at the Toronto MasterCard Centre. The 21 chosen players will represent Team Canada at the 2011 World Women's Championships.

| Number | Name | Position | Height | Club |
| 1 | Shannon Szabados | Goaltender | 5'8 | Canada National team |
| 2 | Meghan Agosta | Forward | 5'7 | Canada National Team; Mercyhurst |
| 3 | Jocelyne Larocque | Defence | 5'6 | Minnesota-Duluth Bulldogs |
| 6 | Rebecca Johnston | Forward | 5'9 | Canada National Team |
| 7 | Cherie Piper | Forward | 5'6 | Canada National Team; Brampton Thunder |
| 10 | Gillian Apps | Forward | 6'0 | Canada National Team; Brampton Thunder |
| 12 | Meghan Mikkelson | Defence | 5'9 | Canada National Team; Edmonton Chimos |
| 13 | Caroline Ouellette | Forward | 5'11 | Canada National Team; Montreal Stars |
| 14 | Bobbi-Jo Slusar | Defence | 5'4 | Strathmore Rockies |
| 15 | Tara Watchorn | Defence | 5'9 | Boston University |
| 16 | Jayna Hefford | Forward | 5'8 | Canada National Team; Brampton Thunder |
| 18 | Catherine Ward | Defence | 5'6 | Boston University |
| 20 | Jennifer Wakefield | Forward | 5'9.5 | Canada National Team; Boston University Terriers |
| 21 | Haley Irwin | Forward | 5'7 | Canada National Team; Minnesota Duluth |
| 22 | Hayley Wickenheiser- C | Forward | 5'10 | Canada National Team |
| 23 | Jocelyne Larocque | Defence | 5'6 | Minnesota Duluth |
| 24 | Natalie Spooner | Forward | 5'9 | Ohio State |
| 25 | Tessa Bonhomme | Defence | 5'7 | Canada National Team; Toronto CWHL |
| 26 | Sarah Vaillancourt | Forward | 5'5 | Canada National Team; Montreal Stars |
| 29 | Marie-Philip Poulin | Forward | 5'6 | Canada National Team; Boston University |
| 32 | Charline Labonte | Goaltender | 5'9 | McGill Martlets |
| 33 | Kim St. Pierre | Goaltender | 5'9 | Canada National Team; Montreal Stars |

=== Schedule ===
| April 16, 2011; 20:00 | Canada | 12–0 (3–0, 5–0, 4–0) | Switzerland | Deutweg rink Attendance: 2,900 |

Charline Labonté
Goalies
Florence Schelling
Sophie Anthamatten
Referee:
(Germany) Nicole Hertrich

| C. Piper (M. Agosta, B-J. Slusar) – 10:42 | 1–0 |
| H. Irwin (R. Johnston, J. Larocque) (SH) – 16:02 | 2–0 |
| H. Wickenheiser (M. Agosta) (SH) – 18:33 | 3–0 |
| M. Mikkelson (H. Wickenheiser) – 23:01 | 4–0 |
| G. Apps (T. Bonhomme) (PP) – 26:33 | 5–0 |
| R. Johnston (T. Watchorn, H. Irwin) (PP) – 29:04 | 6–0 |
| M-P. Poulin (S. Vaillancourt, C. Ward) – 34:30 | 7–0 |
| J. Wakefield (T. Bonhomme) – 34:44 | 8–0 |
| C. Piper (N. Spooner, T. Bonhomme) (PP) – 41:57 | 9–0 |
| J. Hefford (M. Agosta) – 42:40 | 10–0 |
| C. Piper – 54:29 | 11–0 |
| T. Bonhomme (G. Apps, T. Watchorn) (PP) – 59:33 | 12–0 |

16 min
Penalties
14 min
67
Shots
19

| April 17, 2011; 16:00 | Kazakhstan | 0–7 (0–2, 0–3, 0–2) | Canada | Deutweg rink Attendance: 411 |

Daria Obydennova
Goalies
Kim St-Pierre
Referee:
(Finland) Ulla Sipila

| 0–1 | 09:22 – C. Ouellette (S. Vaillancourt, M-P. Poulin) (PP) |
| 0–2 | 12:05 – H. Wickenheiser |
| 0–3 | 20:55 – M-P. Poulin (C. Ouellette) |
| 0–4 | 27:33 – M. Mikkelson |
| 0–5 | 39:46 – M. Mikkelson (S. Vaillancourt, C. Ward) (PP) |
| 0–6 | 43:42 – H. Irwin (R. Johnston, J. Larocque) |
| 0–7 | 52:01 – N. Spooner |

12 min
Penalties
2 min
13
Shots
71

| April 19, 2011; 16:00 | Canada | 2–0 (1–0, 0–0, 1–0) | Finland | Deutweg rink Attendance: 614 |

| Shannon Szabados | Goalies | Noora Räty | Referee: (United States) Erin Blair |
| R. Johnston (H. Irwin) – 12:46 / 1–0; J. Hefford (M. Agosta, H. Wickenheiser) (ENG) – 59:34 / 2–0 | | | Referee: (United States) Erin Blair |
| 8 min | Penalties | 26 min | Referee: (United States) Erin Blair |
| 50 | Shots | 14 | Referee: (United States) Erin Blair |

== Under 18 team ==
The National Under 18 team competed in the IIHF World Under 18 tournament Jan. 1–8 in Stockholm, Sweden. The U.S. women defeated Canada in the final to win the first two world under-18 tournaments in 2008 and 2009 while Canada won the third in 2010. 2011 roster members Erin Ambrose and Emily Fulton were part of the 2010 gold medal team. The roster includes players born in 1993 and 1994. The 20 player roster was chosen from a 31 player training camp held in Toronto. The head coach will be Sarah Hodges (head coach of the University of Regina), while her assistants will be Cassie Turner and former national team member France Montour. On December 30, 2010, in an exhibition vs. the AIK Bantam boys team (at Husby Ishall Arena) from Sweden, Canada bested the club in a 4–2 victory. On January 8, Canada lost the gold medal to the United States by a 5–2 score.

- Scoring leaders 2011 IIHF World Women's U18 Championship

| Player | GP | G | A | Pts | +/− | PIM | POS |
|---|---|---|---|---|---|---|---|
| (Canada) Nicole Kosta | 5 | 5 | 3 | 8 | +5 | 6 | FW |
| (Canada) Meghan Dufault | 5 | 2 | 6 | 8 | +6 | 2 | FW |
| (Canada) Laura Stacey | 5 | 3 | 4 | 7 | +1 | 2 | FW |

GP = Games played; G = Goals; A = Assists; Pts = Points; +/− = Plus/Minus; PIM = Penalties In Minutes; POS = Position

== Under 22 team ==
=== News and notes ===
Jim Fetter, head coach of the Wayne State Warriors women's ice hockey program, will be the head coach of Canada's National Women's Under-22 Team for the 2010–11 season. Fetter will also be the coach for Team Canada at the 2011 MLP Cup.

=== Summer training camp ===
==== Yellow/Blue intrasquad ====
- Game 1: August 8, Blue 4, Yellow 2

| Period | Scorer | Time of Goal | Assists |
| 1 | Isabel Menard | 04:47 | Jennifer Wakefield |
| 1 | Natalie Spooner | 18:57 | Christine Bestland, Lauriane Rougeau |
| 2 | Marie-Philip Poulin | 08:11 | Unassisted |
| 2 | Melodie Daoust | 09:03 | Gillian Saulnier |
| 2 | Jessica Campbell | 10:07 | Unassisted |
| 2 | Marie-Philip Poulin | 15:37 | Laura McIntosh, Jamie Lee Rattray |

===== Intrasquad notes =====
- August 8: Four different players scored goals to give Blue a 4–2 win over Yellow on the first day of intersquad action at the National Women's Under-22 selection camp. The game was played in Toronto at the MasterCard Centre.

Isabel Menard and Natalie Spooner both scored in the first for Blue. Marie-Philip Poulin scored in the second to make it 2–1. Eventually, Blue would be ahead 4–1. Poulin tried to get Yellow into the game, scoring her second of the night. Yellow squad goalie Erica Howe made 40 saves.

==== Roster ====
===== Blue Roster =====
| Player | Position | Club team |
| Roxanne Douville | Goaltender | College Edouard-Montpetit |
| Amanda Mazzotta | Goaltender | Cornell Big Red |
| Hayleigh Cudmore | Defense | Oakville (PWHL) |
| Jenna Downey | Defense | St. Francis Xavier University |
| Brigitte Lacquette | Defense | Pursuit of Excellence |
| Stefanie McKeough | Defense | Ohio State Buckeyes |
| Katelyn Ptolemy | Defense | Clarkson Golden Knights |
| Lauriane Rougeau | Defense | Cornell Big Red |
| Vicki Bendus | Forward | Mercyhurst Lakers |
| Christine Bestland | Forward | Pursuit of Excellence |
| Jessica Campbell | Forward | Pursuit of Excellence |
| Mélodie Daoust | Forward | College Edouard-Montpetit |
| Vanessa Emond | Forward | St. Lawrence Skating Saints |
| Rebecca Johnston | Forward | Cornell Big Red |
| Chelsea Karpenko | Forward | Cornell Big Red |
| Jenelle Kohanchuk | Forward | Boston University Terriers |
| Isabel Menard | Forward | Syracuse Orange |
| Jillian Saulnier | Forward | Toronto (PWHL) |
| Natalie Spooner | Forward | Ohio State Buckeyes |
| Jennifer Wakefield | Forward | Boston University Terriers |

===== Yellow Roster =====
| Player | Position | Club team |
| Erica Howe | Goaltender | Ottawa (PWHL) |
| Genevieve Lacasse | Goaltender | Providence Friars |
| Courtney Birchard | Defence | New Hampshire Wildcats |
| Andrea Boras | Defence | Alberta Pandas |
| Laura Fortino | Defence | Cornell Big Red |
| Brittany Haverstock | Defence | Wisconsin Badgers |
| Saige Pacholok | Defence | Wisconsin Badgers |
| Cassandra Poudrier | Defence | Quebec (Midget AA) |
| Tara Watchorn | Defence | Boston University Terriers |
| Hannah Armstrong | Forward | Aurora (PWHL) |
| Bailey Bram | Forward | Mercyhurst |
| Mallory Deluce | Forward | Wisconsin Badgers |
| Brianne Jenner | Forward | Canadian National Women's Team |
| Jocelyn LeBlanc | Forward | Dalhousie University |
| Laura McIntosh | Forward | Ohio State Buckeyes |
| Marie-Philip Poulin | Forward | Canadian National Women's Team |
| Jamie Lee Rattray | Forward | Ottawa (PWHL) |
| Kelly Terry | Forward | Whitby (PWHL) |
| Catherine White | Forward | Cornell Big Red |
| Jessica Wong | Forward | Minnesota Duluth Bulldogs |

=== August series vs. USA ===
- Marie-Philip Poulin scored a hat trick as the Under 22 team beat the US by a 7–2 score. With the victory, Canada had a three game sweep in its exhibition series vs. the US.

==== Series summary ====
| Date | Score | Canada goals |
| Aug. 18 | Canada 4–1 USA | Laura Fortino, Jillian Saulnier, Natalie Spooner, Jessica Wong |
| Aug. 19 | Canada 6–5 USA (shootout) | Brianne Jenner, Isabel Menard, Natalie Spooner, Jennifer Wakefield (3) |
| Aug. 21 | Canada 7–2 USA | Vicki Bendus, Laura Fortino, Marie-Philip Poulin (3), Rebecca Johnston, Jillian Saulnier |

=== MLP Cup ===
In the 2011 MLP Cup, Lacasse earned a shutout in a 5–0 defeat of Switzerland on January 4. Prior to the match, she had made 57 consecutive starts for the Friars. Lacasse earned a shutout in the gold medal game of the 2011 MLP Cup, as Canada prevailed over Sweden by a 6–0 mark. Vicki Bendus was the leading scorer for Canada.

==== Schedule ====
| Date | Opponent | Score | Goal Scorers |
| Jan. 4 | Switzerland | Canada 5- 0 Switzerland | Jessica Campbell (2), Courtney Birchard, Chelsea Karpenko, Laura McIntosh |
| Jan. 9 | Sweden | Canada 6–0 Sweden | Laura Fortino, Catherine White, Vicki Bendus, Jenelle Kohanchuk, Chelsea Karpenko, Bailey Bram |

==== Roster ====
| Number | Name | Position | Team |
| 30 | Roxanne Douville | Goaltender | Vermont Catamounts women's ice hockey |
| 31 | Genevieve Lacasse | Goaltender | Providence Friars women's ice hockey |
| 2 | Stefanie McKeough | Defence | Wisconsin Badgers women's ice hockey |
| 3 | Brittany Haverstock | Defence | Wisconsin |
| 4 | Lauriane Rougeau | Defence | Cornell Big Red women's ice hockey |
| 7 | Tara Watchorn | Defence | Boston University Terriers women's ice hockey |
| 14 | Courtney Birchard | Defence | New Hampshire Wildcats women's ice hockey |
| 23 | Laura Fortino | Defence | Cornell |
| 25 | Jessica Wong | Defence | Minnesota Duluth Bulldogs women's ice hockey |
| 8 | Natalie Spooner | Forward | Ohio State Buckeyes women's ice hockey |
| 9 | Jenelle Kohanchuk | Forward | Boston University |
| 10 | Jessica Campbell | Forward | Cornell |
| 11 | Laura McIntosh | Forward | Ohio State |
| 12 | Isabel Menard | Forward | Syracuse Orange women's ice hockey |
| 13 | Bailey Bram | Forward | Mercyhurst Lakers women's ice hockey |
| 15 | Jillian Saulnier | Forward | Toronto Jr. Aeros |
| 16 | Chelsea Karpenko | Forward | Cornell |
| 18 | Catherine White | Forward | Cornell |
| 20 | Mallory Deluce | Forward | Wisconsin |
| 26 | Carolyne Prevost | Forward | Wisconsin |
| 27 | Vicki Bendus – C | Forward | Mercyhurst |

== 2011 Winter Universiade ==
=== Group A final standings ===
Six participating teams were placed in one group. After playing a round-robin, the top four teams in each group plus to the Semifinals. The fifth and sixth placed teams will play a playoff for fifth place.

| Team advanced to Semifinals |
| Team competes in Placing Round |

| Team | GP | W | OTW | OTL | L | GF | GA | DIF | PTS |
|---|---|---|---|---|---|---|---|---|---|
| Canada | 5 | 4 | 1 | 0 | 0 | 39 | 1 | +38 | 14 |
| Finland | 5 | 4 | 0 | 1 | 0 | 49 | 3 | +46 | 13 |
| Slovakia | 5 | 3 | 0 | 0 | 2 | 33 | 11 | +22 | 9 |
| United States | 5 | 2 | 0 | 0 | 3 | 25 | 18 | +7 | 6 |
| Great Britain | 5 | 1 | 0 | 0 | 4 | 11 | 36 | −25 | 3 |
| Turkey | 5 | 0 | 0 | 0 | 5 | 0 | 88 | −88 | 0 |

=== Schedule ===
| January 27, 2011; 16:00 | Canada | 2 – 1 GWS ( 0–0, 0–1, 1–0 ) ( OT: 0–0 ) ( SO: 1–0 ) | Finland | 500 Ice Rink, Erzurum |

Game reference

| January 28, 2011; 19:00 | Canada | 3–0 (3–0, 0–0, 0–0) | Slovakia | 500 Ice Rink, Erzurum |

Game reference

| January 30, 2011; 11:00 | Canada | 14–0 (4–0, 4–0, 6–0) | Great Britain | 500 Ice Rink, Erzurum |

Game reference

| January 31, 2011; 11:00 | United States | 0–9 (0–3, 0–4, 0–2) | Canada | 500 Ice Rink, Erzurum |

Game reference

| February 2, 2011; 20:00 | Turkey | 0–11 (0–4, 0–4, 0–3) | Canada | 3000 Ice Rink, Erzurum |

Game reference

==== Semifinals ====
| February 4, 2011; 20:00 | Canada | 8–1 (2–1, 3–0, 3–0) | United States | 3000 Ice Rink, Erzurum |

Game reference

==== Finals ====
| February 5, 2011; 13:00 | Canada | 4–1 (1–0, 2–0, 1–1) | Finland | 3000 Ice Rink, Erzurum; Attendance: 2,111 |

http://www.universiadeerzurum.org/pdfts/IHW400101/C74

Liz Knox
Goalies
Anna Vanhatalo
Referees:
(United States) Leah O'Brian
(Slovakia) Magdalena Cerhitova, (Slovakia) Michaela Kudelova

| Deschenes – 18:29 | 1 – 0 |
| Zerafa – 24:01 | 2 – 0 |
| Bettez – 35:14 | 3 – 0 |
| | 3 – 1 | 42:19 – Hovi (Tuomanen) (PP) |
| Hill (Styles, Webster) (PP) – 56:27 | 4 – 1 |

4 min
Penalties
6 min
34
Shots
21

=== Roster ===
Goalies

- Beth Clause
- Liz Knox

Defense

- Jenna Downey
- Suzanne Fenerty
- Carly Hill
- Caitlin MacDonald
- Alicia Martin
- Jacalyn Sollis
- Kelsey Webster

Forwards

- Ann-Sophie Bettez
- Vanessa Davidson
- Kim Deschênes
- Breanne George
- Alicia Martin
- Jacalyn Sollis
- Jocelyn Leblanc
- Andrea Ironside
- Addie Miles
- Mariève Provost
- Ellie Seedhouse
- Candice Styles
- Courtney Unruh
- Jessica Zerafa

== Awards and honours ==
- Rebecca Johnston, Player of the Game, Gold medal game at the 2010 Four Nations Cup
- Female Hockey Breakthrough Award: (outstanding contribution to advancing female hockey)

Laurie Taylor-Bolton

- Liz MacKinnon Award: (special contributions of a Hockey Canada volunteer's spouse) Jill Donovan
