= 2010 4 Nations Cup =

International ice hockey competition

Tournament details
- Host country: Canada
- Venues: 2 (in 2 host cities)
- Dates: November 9–13
- Teams: 4

Final positions
- Champions: Canada (12th title)
- Runners-up: United States
- Third place: Finland
- Fourth place: Sweden

Tournament statistics
- Games played: 8
- Goals scored: 48 (6 per game)

The 2010 4 Nations Cup was an international women's ice hockey competition held in Clarenville, Newfoundland and Labrador and St. John's, Newfoundland and Labrador from November 9 to November 13, 2010. Games were played at the Clarenville Events Centre and Mile One Centre. The 15th edition of the international tournament was held in Newfoundland to help Hockey Newfoundland and Labrador mark its 75th anniversary. The teams involved were from Canada, the United States, Sweden and Finland.

== Gold medal game ==
In the gold medal game of the 2010 4 Nations Cup, Rebecca Johnston's second goal of the game won the gold medal for Canada. The goal came on a power play 6:21 into overtime and gave Canada a 3-2 win over the United States. The game was Hockey Canada's 12th championship in the tournament's 15-year history.

Meaghan Mikkelson of St. Albert, Alberta, had a goal and an assist for Canada, while Shannon Szabados of Edmonton stopped 24 shots for the victory. Julie Chu and Kendall Coyne Schofield scored for the United States. Goaltender Molly Schaus faced 52 shots, including 20 in a scoreless third period, and faced 11 shots in overtime.

Johnston notched the only goal of the first period, with 3:14 left in the period. The U.S. jumped ahead 2-1 midway through the second period, when Chu and Coyne scored in a span of 1:17. Mikkelson drew Canada even with 1:49 left in the third period. Kacey Bellamy picked up a tripping penalty 4:58 into overtime. This led to Johnston scoring on a 4-on-3 power play 1:23 later. The attendance at Mile One Centre was 6,200.

== Canada ==
- November 8: The Canadian National women's team played against the St. John's Pennecon Privateers boys team. The game was contested at the glacier in Mount Pearl, Newfoundland and Labrador as a warmup for the 4 Nations Cup. Joe Trenholm's goal with just over two minutes to go in the third period was the game-winning goal. The Privateers triumphed by a 5-4 tally.
- November 11: Canada's National Women's Team was at Duckworth and Water Street to observe Remembrance Day ceremonies in downtown St. John's.

=== Roster ===
| Number | Name | Position | Height | Club |
|---|---|---|---|---|
| 1 | Shannon Szabados | Goaltender | 5 ft 8 in (173 cm) | 2009-10 Canada women's national ice hockey team |
| 2 | Meghan Agosta | Forward | 5 ft 7 in (170 cm) | 2009-10 Canada women's national ice hockey team Mercyhurst |
| 6 | Rebecca Johnston | Forward | 5 ft 9 in (175 cm) | 2009-10 Canada women's national ice hockey team |
| 7 | Cherie Piper | Forward | 5 ft 6 in (168 cm) | 2009-10 Canada women's national ice hockey team Brampton Thunder |
| 8 | Annie Guay | Defence | 5 ft 8 in (173 cm) | Montreal Stars |
| 10 | Gillian Apps | Forward | 6 ft 0 in (183 cm) | 2009-10 Canada women's national ice hockey team Brampton Thunder |
| 12 | Meghan Mikkelson | Defence | 5 ft 9 in (175 cm) | 2009-10 Canada women's national ice hockey team Edmonton Chimos |
| 13 | Caroline Ouellette - A | Forward | 5 ft 11 in (180 cm) | 2009-10 Canada women's national ice hockey team Montreal Stars |
| 14 | Courtney Birchard | Defence | 5 ft 9 in (175 cm) | New Hampshire |
| 15 | Tara Watchorn | Defence | 5 ft 9 in (175 cm) | Boston University |
| 16 | Jayna Hefford - A | Forward | 5 ft 8 in (173 cm) | 2009-10 Canada women's national ice hockey team Brampton Thunder |
| 18 | Bobbi Jo Slusar | Defence | 5 ft 4 in (163 cm) | Strathmore Rockies |
| 19 | Brianne Jenner | Forward | 5 ft 9 in (175 cm) | Cornell Big Red |
| 20 | Jennifer Wakefield | Forward | 5'9.5 | 2009-10 Canada women's national ice hockey team Boston University Terriers |
| 21 | Haley Irwin | Forward | 5 ft 7 in (170 cm) | 2009-10 Canada women's national ice hockey team Minnesota Duluth |
| 22 | Hayley Wickenheiser - C | Forward | 5 ft 10 in (178 cm) | 2009-10 Canada women's national ice hockey team |
| 23 | Jocelyne Larocque | Defence | 5 ft 6 in (168 cm) | Minnesota Duluth |
| 24 | Natalie Spooner | Forward | 5 ft 9 in (175 cm) | Ohio State |
| 25 | Tessa Bonhomme - A | Defence | 5 ft 7 in (170 cm) | 2009-10 Canada women's national ice hockey team Toronto (CWHL) |
| 26 | Sarah Vaillancourt | Forward | 5 ft 5 in (165 cm) | 2009-10 Canada women's national ice hockey team |
| 28 | Vicki Bendus | Forward | 5 ft 2 in (157 cm) | Mercyhurst |
| 29 | Marie-Philip Poulin | Forward | 5 ft 6 in (168 cm) | 2009-10 Canada women's national ice hockey team Boston University |
| 30 | Christina Kessler | Goaltender | 5 ft 6 in (168 cm) | Burlington Barracudas |
| 33 | Kim St. Pierre | Goaltender | 5 ft 9 in (175 cm) | 2009-10 Canada women's national ice hockey team |

=== Stats ===
| = Indicates team leader |

| Name | GP | Goals | Assists | Points |
|---|---|---|---|---|
| Meghan Agosta | 4 | 1 | 7 | 8 |
| Haley Irwin | 4 | 3 | 5 | 8 |
| Vicki Bendus | 4 | 2 | 5 | 7 |
| Rebecca Johnston | 4 | 4 | 3 | 7 |
| Jenn Wakefield | 4 | 2 | 5 | 7 |

== Finland ==
=== Roster ===
| Number | Name | Position | Height | Club |
|---|---|---|---|---|
| 1 | Anna Vanhatalo | Goaltender | 5 ft 10 in (178 cm) | SKIF, Nizhny Novgorod |
| 2 | Suvi Vacker | Defence | 5 ft 6 in (168 cm) | JYP Jyvaskyla |
| 4 | Rosa Lindstedt | Defence | 6 ft 1 in (185 cm) | Ilves Tampere |
| 5 | Mariia Posa | Defence | 5 ft 5 in (165 cm) | Minnesota Duluth |
| 6 | Jenni Hiirikoski | Defence | 5 ft 3 in (160 cm) | JYP Jyvaskyla |
| 14 | Niina Makinen | Forward | 5 ft 8 in (173 cm) | |
| 15 | Minttu Tuominen | Forward | 5 ft 5 in (165 cm) | Ohio State |
| 29 | Karolina Rantamaki | Forward | 5 ft 4 in (163 cm) | SKIF, Nizhny Novgorod |
| 30 | Maija Hassinen | Goaltender | 5 ft 3 in (160 cm) | HPK Hameenlinna |
| 31 | Noora Raty | Goaltender | 5 ft 5 in (165 cm) | Minnesota |

== Sweden ==
=== Roster ===
| Number | Name | Position | Height | Club |
|---|---|---|---|---|
| 2 | Elin Holmlov | Forward | 5 ft 8 in (173 cm) | Minnesota Duluth |
| 13 | Erica Uden Johansson | Forward | 5 ft 7 in (170 cm) | Quinnipiac |
| 30 | Kim Martin | Goaltender | 5 ft 5 in (165 cm) | 2010 Sweden women's national ice hockey team |

== United States ==
=== Roster ===
| Number | Name | Position | Height | Club |
|---|---|---|---|---|
| 1 | Molly Schaus | G | 5 ft 8 in (173 cm) | Boston College Eagles |
| 31 | Jessie Vetter | G | 5 ft 8 in (173 cm) | 2009–10 United States women's national ice hockey team |
| 22 | Kacey Bellamy | D | 5 ft 8 in (173 cm) | 2009–10 United States women's national ice hockey team |
| 8 | Caitlin Cahow | D | 5 ft 4 in (163 cm) | 2009–10 United States women's national ice hockey team |
| 9 | Molly Engstrom | D | 5 ft 9 in (175 cm) | 2009–10 United States women's national ice hockey team |
| | Meagan Mangene | D | 5 ft 6 in (168 cm) | Boston College Eagles |
| | Michelle Picard | D | 5 ft 6 in (168 cm) | Noble and Greenough School/Massachusetts Spitfires U19 |
| | Josephine Pucci | D | 5 ft 8 in (173 cm) | Harvard Crimson |
| | Anne Schleper | D | 5 ft 10 in (178 cm) | Minnesota Golden Gophers |
| 13 | Julie Chu | F | 5 ft 8 in (173 cm) | 2009–10 United States women's national ice hockey team |
| | Kendall Coyne | F | 5 ft 2 in (157 cm) | Berkshire School |
| | Brianna Decker | F | 5 ft 4 in (163 cm) | Wisconsin |
| 10 | Meghan Duggan | F | 5 ft 9 in (175 cm) | Wisconsin |
| | Sarah Erickson | F | 5 ft 7 in (170 cm) | Minnesota |
| | Amanda Kessel | F | 5 ft 6 in (168 cm) | Minnesota |
| 21 | Hilary Knight | F | 5 ft 10 in (178 cm) | Wisconsin |
| 17 | Jocelyne Lamoureux | F | 5 ft 6 in (168 cm) | North Dakota |
| 7 | Monique Lamoureux | F | 5 ft 6 in (168 cm) | North Dakota |
| | Erika Lawler | F | 5 ft 0 in (152 cm) | 2009–10 United States women's national ice hockey team |
| | Jenny Potter | F | 5 ft 4 in (163 cm) | 2009–10 United States women's national ice hockey team |
| | Haley Skarupa | F | 5 ft 5 in (165 cm) | Washington Pride U19 |
| | Allie Thunstrom | F | 5 ft 5 in (165 cm) | Boston College |

== Schedule ==
| Date | Teams | Location | Time | Score | Goal scorers |
|---|---|---|---|---|---|
| Fri Nov 5 | USA vs. Sweden (exhibition) | Brunswick, Maine | 7 pm | US, 4-1 | Jinelle Zaugg-Siergiej (2), Caitlin Cahow, Allie Thunstrom |
| Tues Nov 9 | Finland vs. Sweden | Clarenville, Newfoundland | 7 pm | Finland 3-0 | Saara Tuominen, Karoliina Rantamäki, Michelle Karvinen |
| Tues Nov 9 | USA vs. Canada | St. John's, Newfoundland | 7:30 pm | USA 3-2 (Shootout) | US: Jenny Potter, Meghan Duggan; Can: Marie-Philip Poulin, Meaghan Mikkelson |
| Wed Nov 10 | Sweden vs. Canada | Clarenville, Nfld | 7 pm | Canada, 8-1 | Can: Natalie Spooner (3), Haley Irwin, Rebecca Johnston (2), Vicki Bendus, Meaghan Mikkelson; Swe: Therése Sjolander |
| Wed Nov 10 | USA vs. Finland | St. John's, Nfld | 7:30 pm | USA, 4-0 | US: Jocelyne Lamoureux, Brianne Decker, Meghan Duggan (2) |
| Fri Nov 12 | USA vs. Sweden | St. John's, Nfld | 1:00 pm | USA, 4-0 | Hilary Knight, Kacey Bellamy, Monique Lamoureux, Erika Lawler |
| Fri Nov 12 | Canada vs. Finland | St. John's, Nfld | 7:30 pm | Canada, 15-0 | Meghan Agosta, Meaghan Mikkelson, Marie-Philip Poulin (3), Jennifer Wakefield (2), Jayna Hefford, Caroline Ouellette, Hayley Wickenheiser, Haley Irwin (2), Vicki Bendus, Cherie Piper, Natalie Spooner |
| Sat Nov 13 | Finland vs. Sweden (bronze-medal game) | St. John's, Nfld | 4:00 pm | Finland 2-1 | Fin:Karoliina Rantamäki, Annina Rajahuhta; Swe: Pernilla Winberg |
| Sat Nov 13 | Canada vs. US (gold-medal game) | St. John's, Nfld | 7:30 pm | 3-2 (OT) | Canada: Rebecca Johnston(2), Meaghan Mikkelson; US:Julie Chu, Kendall Coyne |

== Awards and honors ==
=== Player of the game ===
| Date | Player | Country | Player | Country |
|---|---|---|---|---|
| Nov. 10 | Rosa Lindstedt | Finland | Brianna Decker | United States |
| Nov. 13 | Rebecca Johnston | Canada | Molly Schaus | United States |

== See also ==
- 4 Nations Cup
