= 2009–10 Minnesota Golden Gophers women's ice hockey season =

WCHA regular season champions NCAA Frozen Four, Lost semifinals, 2–3 vs. Minnesota Duluth
- Conference: WCHA
- Home ice: Ridder Arena

Rankings
- USA Today/USA Hockey Magazine: 4
- USCHO.com/CBS College Sports: 3

Record
- Overall: 3–1–0
- Conference: 18–6–4
- Home: 20–1–1
- Road: 6–6–4
- Neutral: 0–2–0

Coaches and captains
- Head coach: Brad Frost
- Assistant coaches: Tom Osiecki; Jamie Wood
- Captain: Michelle Maunu
- Alternate captain(s): Brittany Francis; Terra Rasmussen; Emily West

The 2009–10 Minnesota Golden Gophers women's hockey team represented the University of Minnesota during the 2009–10 NCAA Division I women's hockey season. The Golden Gophers were coached by Brad Frost in his third season and played their home games at Ridder Arena. The University of Minnesota hosted the 2010 NCAA Division I Women's Ice hockey Tournament's championship game on March 21, 2010, at Ridder Arena in Minneapolis. It marked the third time that Minneapolis hosted the Frozen Four. The Golden Gophers are a member of the Western Collegiate Hockey Association and attempted to win their fourth NCAA Women's Ice Hockey Championship.

== Offseason ==
- Samantha Downey (Hermantown, Minn.) and Katie Frischmann (Rochester, Minn.) will join the Golden Gopher program for the upcoming season. The two additions close out the Gopher freshman recruiting class for the 2009–2010 campaign, which also includes Megan Bozek (Buffalo Grove, Ill.), Becky Kortum (Minnetonka, Minn.), Mira Jalosuo (Lieksa, Finland) and Noora Räty (Espoo, Finland).

Downey joins the Gopher program after a successful senior year with Proctor-Hermantown-Marshall. She was an all-state honoree in 2008–09, and broke the school record with 37 goals and 74 points. She helped the Mirage to a 20–7–1 record.

Katie Frischmann, is a 5–5 defenseman, has received an acceptance of admission into the university. She played with the Minnesota Thoroughbreds for three years. In her senior year, Frischmann was a captain for a team that went 33–25–5. Along with her accomplishments on the ice, Frischmann was a four-year letterwinner in the soccer and a three-year letterwinner in lacrosse.

- August 24: Three former Golden Gophers hockey players made the United States National Team roster. Natalie Darwitz, Rachael Drazan and Gigi Marvin will compete with Team USA as they prepare for the 2010 Winter Olympics. In all, 23 players were named to the team, while 21 advance as a member of the U.S. Olympic Team and a chance at a gold medal.
- September 9: The WCHA announced that Golden Gophers goaltender Alyssa Grogan, defenseman Anne Schleper and forward Emily West have been named as WCHA All-Stars. The three Gophers are among 22 players from the conference to face the 2009–10 U.S Women's National Team in St. Paul, Minn.

== Regular season ==
- October 5: The Minnesota Golden Gophers women's hockey team was ranked No. 2 in the country. The USCHO.com officials revealed it in their first Top-10 Women's Hockey Poll of the season. Minnesota accumulated 139 points and six first-place nods.
- Tuesday, January 12: The Golden Gophers played an exhibition game against the United States women's Olympic hockey team at Ridder Arena. The US team beat the Gophers by a score of 8–5. Team USA outshot the Golden Gophers, 56–21.
- February 28: Incoming Gophers freshman, Bethany Brausen, a senior forward at Roseville Area High School, has won the 15th annual Ms. Hockey Award by Let's Play Hockey newspaper. Brausen became the third player from Roseville to be named Ms. Hockey/ The first was Winny Brodt, while the second was former Golden Gopher Ronda Curtin.

=== Standings ===
2009–10 Western Collegiate Hockey Association standings
	Conference								Overall					
	GP	W	L	T	SOW	PTS	GF	GA	GP	W	L	T	GF	GA
Minnesota Duluth†*	28	20	6	2	1	43	90	55	41	31	8	2	138	83
Minnesota†	28	18	6	4	3	43	91	49	40	26	9	5	129	74
St. Cloud State	28	11	11	6	4	32	70	77	37	15	14	8	96	103
Wisconsin	28	15	12	1	0	31	84	63	36	18	15	3	107	82
Ohio State	28	12	13	3	1	28	90	94	37	17	15	5	122	117
Bemidji State	28	9	12	7	3	28	47	64	38	12	19	7	65	98
Minnesota State	28	5	18	5	3	18	49	92	34	7	22	5	66	117
North Dakota	28	7	19	2	0	16	44	71	34	8	22	4	61	92
Championship: † indicates conference regular season champion; * indicates conference tournament champion Updated July 21, 2024

=== Schedule ===
As of September 29, 2024.

Date	Time	Opponent^{#}	Rank^{#}	Site	Decision	Result	Attendance	Record
Regular Season
October 2	6:07	Syracuse*	#3	Ridder Arena • Minneapolis, MN	Grogan	W 4–3	921	1–0–0
October 4	2:07	Syracuse*	#3	Ridder Arena • Minneapolis, MN	Räty	W 4–1	1,049	2–0–0
October 9	7:07	at Ohio State	#2	Ohio State University Ice Rink • Columbus, OH	Grogan	W 6–5	361	3–0–0 (1–0–0)
October 10	7:07	at Ohio State	#2	Ohio State University Ice Rink • Columbus, OH	Räty	W 6–1	572	4–0–0 (2–0–0)
October 16	7:07	#5 Minnesota Duluth	#2	Ridder Arena • Minneapolis, MN	Räty	W 3–1	1,152	5–0–0 (3–0–0)
October 17	4:07	#5 Minnesota Duluth	#2	Ridder Arena • Minneapolis, MN	Räty	W 3–0	1,119	6–0–0 (4–0–0)
October 23	2:07	at St. Cloud State	#2	Herb Brooks National Hockey Center • St. Cloud, MN	Räty	W 4–0	259	7–0–0 (5–0–0)
October 24	4:07	St. Cloud State	#2	Ridder Arena • Minneapolis, MN	Grogan	W 7–0	1,176	8–0–0 (6–0–0)
October 30	2:07	at #9 Wisconsin	#2	Kohl Center • Madison, WI	Räty	L 2–4	1,905	8–1–0 (6–1–0)
November 1	2:07	at #9 Wisconsin	#2	Kohl Center • Madison, WI	Grogan	W 2–5	1,870	8–2–0 (6–2–0)
November 13	7:07	at Minnesota State		Verizon Wireless Center • Mankato, MN	Räty	W 4–1	265	9–2–0 (7–2–0)
November 14	3:07	at Minnesota State		Verizon Wireless Center • Mankato, MN	Räty	T 1–1 ^{OT}	384	9–2–1 (7–2–1)
November 20	6:07	Bemidji State	#2	Ridder Arena • Minneapolis, MN	Räty	W 4–2	927	10–2–1 (8–2–1)
November 21	4:07	Bemidji State	#2	Ridder Arena • Minneapolis, MN	Räty	W 3–1	1,202	11–2–1 (9–2–1)
November 27	7:07	#3 Clarkson*	#2	Ridder Arena • Minneapolis, MN	Räty	W 4–0	1,033	12–2–1 (9–2–1)
November 28	3:07	#3 Clarkson*	#2	Ridder Arena • Minneapolis, MN	Räty	W 2–0	1,080	13–2–1 (9–2–1)
December 4	7:00	at #9 Harvard*	#2	Bright Hockey Center • Cambridge, MA	Räty	L 0–1	409	13–3–1 (9–2–1)
December 5	4:00	at #9 Harvard*	#2	Bright Hockey Center • Cambridge, MA	Räty	T 0–0 ^{OT}	703	13–3–2 (9–2–1)
December 12	2:07	at North Dakota	#2	Ralph Engelstad Arena • Grand Forks, ND	Räty	W 3–1	446	14–3–2 (10–2–1)
December 13	2:07	at North Dakota	#2	Ralph Engelstad Arena • Grand Forks, ND	Räty	W 5–0	374	15–3–2 (11–2–1)
January 8	6:07	#10 Ohio State	#2	Ridder Arena • Minneapolis, MN	Grogan	W 5–2	951	16–3–2 (12–2–1)
January 9	4:07	#10 Ohio State	#2	Ridder Arena • Minneapolis, MN	Grogan	W 6–0	1358	17–3–2 (13–2–1)
January 15	6:07	at Bemidji State	#2	John S. Glas Field House • Bemidji, MN	Räty	T 1–1 ^{SO}	135	17–3–3 (13–2–2)
January 16	4:07	at Bemidji State	#2	John S. Glas Field House • Bemidji, MN	Räty	T 1–1 ^{SO}	242	17–3–4 (13–2–3)
January 22	7:07	North Dakota	#2	Ridder Arena • Minneapolis, MN	Räty	W 3–0	982	18–3–4 (14–2–3)
January 23	4:07	North Dakota	#2	Ridder Arena • Minneapolis, MN	Räty	W 2–0	1,594	19–3–4 (15–2–3)
January 29	7:07	Minnesota State	#2	Ridder Arena • Minneapolis, MN	Grogan	W 4–2	1,172	20–3–4 (16–2–3)
January 30	4:07	Minnesota State	#2	Ridder Arena • Minneapolis, MN	Grogan	W 4–1	1,361	21–3–4 (17–2–3)
February 5	7:07	at #5 Minnesota Duluth	#1	Duluth Entertainment Convention Center • Duluth, MN	Grogan	L 1–3	1,248	21–4–4 (17–3–3)
February 6	7:07	at #5 Minnesota Duluth	#1	Ridder Arena • Minneapolis, MN	Lura	L 0–3	1,322	21–5–4 (17–4–3)
February 12	7:07	St. Cloud State	#2	Ridder Arena • Minneapolis, MN	Grogan	T 2–2 ^{SO}	1,319	21–5–5 (17–4–4)
February 13	2:07	at St. Cloud State	#2	Herb Brooks National Hockey Center • St. Cloud, MN	Lura	L 3–6	714	21–6–5 (17–5–4)
February 19	6:07	#8 Wisconsin	#2	Ridder Arena • Minneapolis, MN	Grogan	L 3–4 ^{OT}	1,227	21–7–5 (17–6–4)
February 20	4:07	#8 Wisconsin	#2	Ridder Arena • Minneapolis, MN	Grogan	W 3–2	1,404	22–7–5 (18–6–4)
WCHA Tournament
February 26	7:07	Minnesota State*	#3	Ridder Arena • Minneapolis, MN (WCHA Tournament, First Round, Game 1)	Räty	W 8–5	924	23–7–5 (18–6–4)
February 27	4:07	Minnesota State*	#3	Ridder Arena • Minneapolis, MN (WCHA Tournament, First Round, Game 2)	Räty	W 4–3 ^{3OT}	905	24–7–5 (18–6–4)
March 6	3:07	Ohio State*	#3	Ridder Arena • Minneapolis, MN (WCHA Tournament, Semifinal Game)	Räty	W 5–4 ^{2OT}	1,252	25–7–5 (18–6–4)
March 7	12:07	#2 Minnesota Duluth*	#3	Ridder Arena • Minneapolis, MN (WCHA Tournament, Championship Game)	Räty	L 2–3	824	25–8–5 (18–6–4)
NCAA Tournament
March 13	4:07	#6 Clarkson*	#3	Ridder Arena • Minneapolis, MN (NCAA Tournament, First Round)	Räty	W 3–2 ^{OT}	785	26–8–5 (18–6–4)
March 19	8:38	#2 Minnesota Duluth*	#3	Ridder Arena • Minneapolis, MN (NCAA Tournament, Frozen Four)	Räty	L 2–3	2,070	26–9–5 (18–6–4)
*Non-conference game. ^{#}Rankings from USCHO.com Poll.

=== Roster ===
No.	Nat.	Player	Class	Pos	Height	DoB	Hometown	Previous team
1		Jenny Lura	Junior	G	5' 8" (1.73 m)	1989-09-07	North Vancouver, British Columbia	Sentinel Secondary School
2		Kelly Seeler	Sophomore	D	5' 6" (1.68 m)	1990-05-18	Eden Prairie, Minnesota	Eden Prairie High School
3		Samantha Downey	Freshman	F	5' 9" (1.75 m)	1991-02-19	Silver Bay, Minnesota	Proctor High School
4		Sarah Erickson	Sophomore	F	5' 6" (1.68 m)	1990-03-28	Roseau, Minnesota	Bemidji High School
5		Laura May	Junior	F	5' 8" (1.73 m)	1989-08-05	Dellwood, Minnesota	Mahtomedi High School
6		Katie Frischmann	Freshman	F/D	5' 5" (1.65 m)	1991-01-06	Rochester, Minnesota	Minnesota Thoroughbreds
7		Kelli Blankenship	Senior	F	5' 6" (1.68 m)	1987-06-23	Lusby, Maryland	North American Hockey Academy
8		Mira Jalosuo	Freshman	D	6' 0" (1.83 m)	1989-02-03	Lieksa, Finland	Finland women's national ice hockey team
9		Jaimie Horton	Senior	F	5' 7" (1.7 m)	1988-04-24	Maple Grove, Minnesota	Maple Grove High School
10		Brittany Francis	Senior	F	5' 7" (1.7 m)	1987-12-02	Thunder Bay, Ontario	Toronto Jr. Aeros
11		Becky Kortum	Freshman	F	5' 7" (1.7 m)	1991-05-07	Minnetonka, Minnesota	Hopkins High School
14		Chelsey Jones	Senior	F	5' 8" (1.73 m)	1988-01-28	Lake Elmo, Minnesota	Stillwater Area High School
17		Emily West	Junior	F	5' 5" (1.65 m)	1989-03-22	Colorado Springs, Colorado	Pine Creek High School
18		Nikki Ludwigson	Sophomore	F	5' 7" (1.7 m)	1989-09-18	Bloomington, Minnesota	Eden Prairie High School
19		Megan Bozek	Freshman	D	5' 9" (1.75 m)	1991-03-27	Buffalo Grove, Illinois	Chicago Mission
20		Alexandra Zebro	Senior	D	6' 0" (1.83 m)	1988-06-16	Oak Grove, Minnesota	Faithful Family Academy
22		Anne Schleper	Sophomore	D	5' 10" (1.78 m)	1990-01-30	St. Cloud, Minnesota	Cathedral High School
24		Jen Schoullis	Junior	F	5' 9" (1.75 m)	1989-03-07	Erie, Pennsylvania	Shattuck-Saint Mary's
25		Terra Rasmussen	Junior	F	5' 7" (1.7 m)	1988-09-04	Coon Rapids, Minnesota	Coon Rapids High School
26		Michelle Maunu	Senior	D	5' 6" (1.68 m)	1987-07-15	Esko, Minnesota	Esko High School
31		Alyssa Grogan	Sophomore	G	5' 6" (1.68 m)	1990-05-15	Eagan, Minnesota	Eagan High School
41		Noora Räty	Freshman	G	5' 5" (1.65 m)	1989-05-29	Espoo, Finland	Finland women's national ice hockey team

== Player stats ==
=== Skaters ===
Player	Games	Goals	Assists	Points	Points/game	PIM	GWG	PPG	SHG
Emily West	38	23	23	46	1.2105	62	10	4	3
Sarah Erickson	40	18	22	40	1.0000	32	2	5	0
Brittany Francis	40	13	25	38	0.9500	26	1	7	0
Anne Schleper	40	12	20	32	0.8000	46	2	7	0
Laura May	40	12	12	24	0.6000	16	3	3	1
Megan Bozek	40	6	18	24	0.6000	40	1	6	0
Chelsey Jones	40	11	9	20	0.5000	24	3	2	1
Kelli Blankenship	37	9	10	19	0.5135	32	0	1	0
Terra Rasmussen	39	9	8	17	0.4359	26	3	1	0
Becky Kortum	40	4	10	14	0.3500	28	0	0	0
Kelly Seeler	40	3	11	14	0.3500	86	0	2	0
Alexandra Zebro	35	1	7	8	0.2286	26	0	0	0
Samantha Downey	40	4	2	6	0.1500	12	1	1	0
Mira Jalosuo	36	1	5	6	0.1667	14	0	0	0
Michelle Maunu	40	0	4	4	0.1000	22	0	0	0
Jaimie Horton	40	1	2	3	0.0750	8	0	0	0
Noora Raty	26	0	3	3	0.1154	0	0	0	0
Katie Frischmann	40	2	0	2	0.0500	4	0	0	0
Alyssa Grogan	13	0	1	1	0.0769	2	0	0	0
Nikki Ludwigson	40	0	1	1	0.0250	4	0	0	0
Jenny Lura	3	0	0	0	0.0000	0	0	0	0

=== Goaltenders ===
Player	Games	Wins	Losses	Ties	Goals against	Minutes	GAA	Shutouts	Saves	Save %
Noora Räty	26	18	4	4	36	1624	1.3303	7	663	.948
Alyssa Grogan	13	8	3	1	29	738	2.3574	2	249	.896
Jenny Lura	3	0	2	0	8	129	3.7291	0	37	.822

== Postseason ==
- February 27: After 3 hours and 47 minutes, Emily West scored at 1:16 of triple overtime to eliminate the MSU-Mankato Mavericks.

=== WCHA Playoffs ===
Date	Location	Opponent	Score	Notes
Feb 26	Ridder Arena	MSU-Mankato	8–5	May and Kortum get 3 points each
Feb 27	Ridder Arena	MSU-Mankato	4–3 (3 OT)	Emily West gets the game winner

=== WCHA Final Faceoff ===
- March 7: The Minnesota Duluth Bulldogs defeated the Minnesota Golden Gophers 3–2 at Ridder Arena in Minneapolis to win the WCHA FINAL FACE-OFF playoff championship. It is the Bulldogs fifth WCHA playoff championship. This was their first postseason victory over the Golden Gophers since 2003. In addition, the Bulldogs lost three previous league playoff games against the Gophers at Ridder Arena.

Date	Location	Opponent	Score	Notes
March 6	Ridder Arena	Ohio State	5–4 (2 OT)	Laura May scored the game-winning goal
March 7	Ridder Arena	Minnesota Duluth		

=== NCAA hockey tournament ===
- March 8: Two teams from the WCHA will compete for the 10th NCAA Women's Ice Hockey Championship. The University of Minnesota will be the host school for the 2010 Frozen Four, to be held March 19 and 21 at Ridder Arena in Minneapolis. WCHA Tournament champion University of Minnesota Duluth, and at-large selection Minnesota will be two of eight competing teams. The Golden Gophers (25–8–5) are the number 3 seed, and will host the Clarkson Golden Eagles (23–11–5), on March 13 at 4:00 pm central standard time.
- March 13: Emily West scored the game-winning goal in overtime as the Golden Gophers defeated Clarkson and earned a trip to the Frozen Four. The final score was 3–2 in overtime.

== Awards and honors ==
- Kelli Blankenship, 2010 Frozen Four Skills Competition participant
- Chelsey Jones, WCHA Offensive Player of the Week (Week of October 5)
- Sarah Erickson, WCHA Offensive Player of the Week (Week of October 12)
- Sarah Erickson, Minnesota, WCHA Player of the Week (Week of January 11)
- Noora Räty, WCHA Defensive Player of the Week (Week of October 19)
- Noora Räty, WCHA Rookie of the Week (Week of October 26)
- Noora Räty, WCHA Co-Defensive Player of the Week (Week of December 7)
- Noora Raty, WCHA Defensive Player of the Week (Week of January 25)
- Noora Räty, Patty Kazmaier Award nominee
- Noora Raty, WCHA Goaltending Champion
- Anne Schleper, Patty Kazmaier Award nominee
- Anne Schleper, WCHA Defensive Player of the Year
- Emily West, Patty Kazmaier Award nominee

=== All-WCHA Team ===
- Noora Raty, G, All-WCHA First Team
- Anne Schleper, D, All-WCHA First Team
- Emily West, F, All-WCHA First Team
- Noora Raty, WCHA All-Rookie Team

=== All-America selections ===
- Noora Raty, 2010 Women's RBK Hockey Division I All-America First Team
- Anne Schleper, 2010 Women's RBK Hockey Division I All-America First Team

== Postseason ==
- April 26: Golden Goldy Award (an award gala held each year to celebrate the University's athletic achievements)
  - Noora Raty earned a Golden Goldy Award as the University's Female Rookie of the Year
  - Anne Schleper also earned a Golden Goldy Award. She was honored as the Female Breakthrough Athlete

== See also ==
- 2009–10 WCHA women's ice hockey season
- 2009–10 NCAA Division I women's ice hockey season
- 2009–10 Minnesota Golden Gophers women's basketball team
