= Doug Lidster =

Canadian ice hockey player and coach

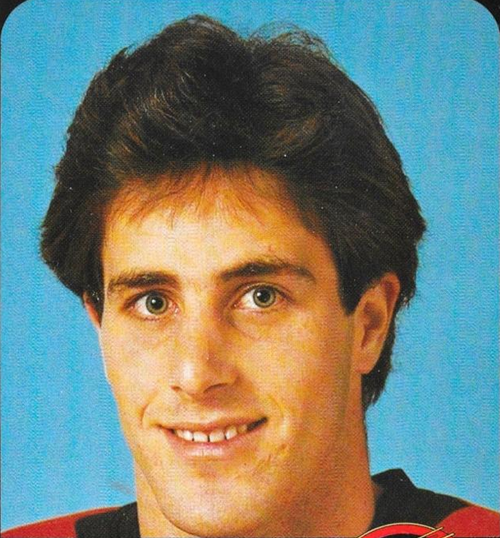
- Born: October 18, 1960 (age 66) Kamloops, British Columbia, Canada
- Height: 6 ft 1 in (185 cm)
- Weight: 200 lb (91 kg; 14 st 4 lb)
- Position: Defence
- Shot: Right
- Played for: Vancouver Canucks; New York Rangers; St. Louis Blues; Dallas Stars
- National team: Canada
- NHL draft: 133rd overall, 1980; Vancouver Canucks
- Playing career: 1983–1999
Medal record
Representing Canada
World Championships
Silver medal – second place	1985 Czechoslovakia
Silver medal – second place	1991 Finland

John Douglas Andrew Lidster (born October 18, 1960) is a Canadian former professional ice hockey defenceman who played in the National Hockey League (NHL). He was an assistant coach for the Vancouver Canucks until the end of the 2016–17 season.

== Playing career ==
Lidster was selected by the Vancouver Canucks in the seventh round, 133rd overall, of the 1980 NHL entry draft. Lidster played four years of college ice hockey for Colorado College before playing for the Canada national team in the 1984 Winter Olympics. He made his NHL debut with the Canucks near the end of the 1983–84 season, and became a reliable presence on the Vancouver blue line until he was traded to the New York Rangers prior to the 1993–94 NHL season. There, he moved into more of a depth role, but still helped guide the 1993–94 Rangers to their first Stanley Cup in 54 years, scoring two goals in the 1994 Stanley Cup Final as they defeated the Canucks. After a brief stint with the St. Louis Blues, he was re-acquired by the Rangers in 1995–96, and played three more seasons for them before signing with the Dallas Stars in early 1999. There he won his second Stanley Cup, before retiring.

== Coaching career ==
Lidster went into coaching, and served as head coach of the Saginaw Spirit in 2004–05. He served as an assistant coach for the Canada women's national team that won gold medals in the 2010 Winter Olympics. He also coached youth in Plymouth, Michigan. As part of the IIHF Ambassador and Mentor Program, Lidster was a Hockey Canada coaching mentor that travelled to Bratislava, Slovakia to participate in the 2011 IIHF High Performance Women's Camp on July 4–12. In 2012, he was named assistant coach of the Texas Stars. On July 7, 2014, he returned to the Canucks as an assistant coach.

== Career statistics ==
=== Regular season and playoffs ===
			Regular season					Playoffs
Season	Team	League	GP	G	A	Pts	PIM	GP	G	A	Pts	PIM
1976–77	Kamloops Jardine Blazers	Minor-BC	—	—	—	—	—	—	—	—	—	—
1977–78	Kamloops Chiefs	BCHL	64	24	39	63	46	—	—	—	—	—
1977–78	Seattle Breakers	WCHL	2	0	0	0	0	—	—	—	—	—
1978–79	Kamloops Rockets	BCHL	59	36	47	83	50	—	—	—	—	—
1979–80	Colorado College	WCHA	39	18	25	43	52	—	—	—	—	—
1980–81	Colorado College	WCHA	36	10	30	40	54	—	—	—	—	—
1981–82	Colorado College	WCHA	36	13	22	35	32	—	—	—	—	—
1982–83	Colorado College	WCHA	34	15	41	56	30	—	—	—	—	—
1983–84	Canada	Intl	59	6	20	26	28	—	—	—	—	—
1983–84	Vancouver Canucks	NHL	8	0	0	0	4	2	0	1	1	0
1984–85	Vancouver Canucks	NHL	78	6	24	30	55	—	—	—	—	—
1985–86	Vancouver Canucks	NHL	78	12	16	28	56	3	0	1	1	2
1986–87	Vancouver Canucks	NHL	80	12	51	63	40	—	—	—	—	—
1987–88	Vancouver Canucks	NHL	64	4	32	36	105	—	—	—	—	—
1988–89	Vancouver Canucks	NHL	63	5	17	22	78	7	1	1	2	9
1989–90	Vancouver Canucks	NHL	80	8	28	36	36	—	—	—	—	—
1990–91	Vancouver Canucks	NHL	78	6	32	38	77	6	0	2	2	6
1991–92	Vancouver Canucks	NHL	66	6	23	29	39	11	1	2	3	11
1992–93	Vancouver Canucks	NHL	71	6	19	25	36	12	0	3	3	8
1993–94	New York Rangers	NHL	34	0	2	2	33	9	2	0	2	10
1994–95	St. Louis Blues	NHL	37	2	7	9	12	4	0	0	0	2
1995–96	New York Rangers	NHL	59	5	9	14	50	7	1	0	1	6
1996–97	New York Rangers	NHL	48	3	4	7	24	15	1	5	6	8
1997–98	New York Rangers	NHL	36	0	4	4	24	—	—	—	—	—
1998–99	Canada	Intl	38	4	15	19	64	—	—	—	—	—
1998–99	Dallas Stars	NHL	17	0	0	0	10	4	0	0	0	2
NHL totals			897	75	268	343	679	80	6	15	21	64

=== International ===
Year	Team	Event	GP	G	A	Pts	PIM
1984	Canada	OG	7	0	2	2	2
1985	Canada	WC	10	3	1	4	4
1990	Canada	WC	10	1	0	1	6
1991	Canada	WC	10	1	4	5	8
Senior totals			37	5	7	12	20

== Awards and honours ==
Award	Year	Ref
All-WCHA First Team	1981–82, 1982–83	
AHCA West All-American	1982–83	
Stanley Cup champion	1994, 1999	

Sporting positions
Preceded by Stan Smyl	Vancouver Canucks captains 1990–91 with Trevor Linden and Dan Quinn	Succeeded by Trevor Linden
