= Marjo Voutilainen =

Finnish ice hockey player and coach

- Born: 22 March 1981 (age 45) Kuopio, Finland
- Height: 1.68 m (5 ft 6 in)
- Weight: 70 kg (154 lb; 11 st 0 lb)
- Position: Forward
- Shot: Left
- Played for: KalPa Kuopio; IHK Helsinki; Espoo Blues; SKIF Nizhny Novgorod; JYP Jyväskylä
- Current NSML coach: Ilves Tampere
- Coached for: KalPa Kuopio
- National team: Finland
- Playing career: 1995–2016
- Coaching career: 2016–present
Medal record
Olympic Games
Bronze medal – third place	2010 Vancouver	Ice hockey
World Championships
Bronze medal – third place	2009 Finland
Bronze medal – third place	2008 China

Marjo Hannele Voutilainen (born 22 March 1981) is a Finnish retired ice hockey player and current head coach of Ilves Naiset in the Naisten Liiga (NSML). During her playing career, she competed internationally with the Finnish national team, winning a bronze medal at the 2010 Winter Olympics in Vancouver and at the IIHF World Women's Championships in 2008 and 2009.

Voutilainen previously served as head coach of KalPa Kuopio in the NSML during 2016 to 2022. She was named Naisten Liiga Coach of the Year for the 2019–20 season, after guiding KalPa to their best regular season finish ever, upon which they built the most successful playoff run in team history. In May 2022, it was announced that she had signed on as head coach with Ilves Naiset to fill the vacancy created when Linda Leppänen resigned from the position a month prior.

== Career stats ==
Event	Goals	Assists	Points	Shots	PIM	+/-
2010 Winter Olympics	1	0	1	0	10	-3

== See also ==
- 2009–10 Finland women's national ice hockey team
- List of Olympic women's ice hockey players for Finland
