= Bobbi-Jo Slusar =

Canadian ice hockey player

- Born: June 6, 1985 (age 41) Swift Current, Saskatchewan, Canada
- Height: 5 ft 4 in (163 cm)
- Weight: 140 lb (64 kg; 10 st 0 lb)
- Position: Defence
- Played for: Alberta Honeybadgers (CWHL); Strathmore Rockies (WWHL); Brampton Thunder (CWHL); Wisconsin Badgers (NCAA)
- National team: Canada
- Playing career: 2007–2013
Medal record
Women's ice hockey
Representing Canada
IIHF World Women's Championships
Silver medal – second place	2011 Switzerland	Tournament
4 Nations Cup
Gold medal – first place	2010 Canada	Tournament
Silver medal – second place	2011 Sweden	Tournament
Air Canada Cup
Gold medal – first place	2004 Germany	Tournament
Gold medal – first place	2005 Germany	Tournament
Gold medal – first place	2006 Germany	Tournament

Bobbi-Jo Slusar (born June 6, 1985) is a Canadian ice hockey player.

Born in Swift Current, Saskatchewan, Slusar was a member of the Canada women's national ice hockey team from 2006 to 2008. Currently, she played for the Brampton Thunder in the Canadian Women's Hockey League (CWHL) and competed in the 2010 Clarkson Cup. During the 2010–11 season, she competed for the Strathmore Rockies of the WWHL. She was drafted 9th overall by the Team Alberta CWHL in the 2011 CWHL Draft.

== Playing career ==
Slusar played for Team Western in 2000. The following year, Slusar claimed a bronze medal with Team West at the 2001 National Women's Under 18 challenge. In 2002, she helped Notre Dame win the provincial Midget AAA championship. During the same year, Slusar participated with Saskatchewan at the 2002 Esso Women's Nationals finishing fifth. In addition, Slusar was the captain of the Saskatchewan Provincial Team in 2003. She captained Saskatchewan to a bronze medal at the 2003 Canada Winter Games. In high school, she played for Athol Murray College of Notre Dame. The team won the Western Shield Championship in 2002, and Slusar was captain of the team in 2003.

=== Hockey Canada ===
Slusar played for Team Canada on numerous occasions. She was a member of the Canadian National Under 22 team and played in the Air Canada Cup every year from 2003 to 2007. In November 2006, she played with Team Canada in the 4 Nations Cup. It was her international debut with the Canadian National Women's Team. She was selected to play for Canada at the 2010 Four Nations Cup.

=== Wisconsin Badgers ===
Slusar won 2 NCAA championships with the Wisconsin Badgers women's ice hockey program in 2006 and 2007. She was the Badgers team captain for the 2006–07 season.

== Career stats ==
Note: GP= Games played; G= Goals; A= Assists; PTS = Points; PIM = Penalties in minutes; PPL = Power-play goals; SHG = Short-handed goals

Year	GP	G	A	Pts	PPL	SHG
2003–04 Wisconsin	27	3	7	10	1	0
2004–05 Wisconsin	35	1	8	9	1	0
2005–06 Wisconsin	39	12	28	40	6	0
2006–07 Wisconsin	39	11	22	33	6	0

Year	GP	G	A	Pts	PIM
2007 Four Nations Cup	4	0	2	2	0
2008 Esso Women's Nationals	3	0	2	2	4

== Awards and honours ==
- Notre Dame Hounds MVP in 2002–03
- 2005–06 NCAA All-Tournament Team
- 2005–06 NCAA First Team All-American
- 2005–06 WCHA First All-Star Team
- 2005–06 WCHA Defensive Player of the year
- Top Ten Finalist, 2006 Patty Kazmaier Award
- 2006–07 NCAA Second Team All-American
- 2006–07 WCHA Second All-Star Team
- 2007 European Air Canada Cup, Tournament All-Star team
- CWHL Second All-Star Team, 2008–09 and 2009–10
- CWHL All-Rookie Team, 2007–08
