= 2009–10 Minnesota Duluth Bulldogs women's ice hockey season =

Canadian Ice Hockey Competition

NCAA Frozen Four, National Champions
- Conference: WCHA

Rankings
- USA Today/USA Hockey Magazine: 1
- USCHO.com/CBS College Sports: 2

Record

Coaches and captains
- Head coach: Shannon Miller
- Assistant coaches: Laura Schuler; Michelle McAteer; Brant Nicklin

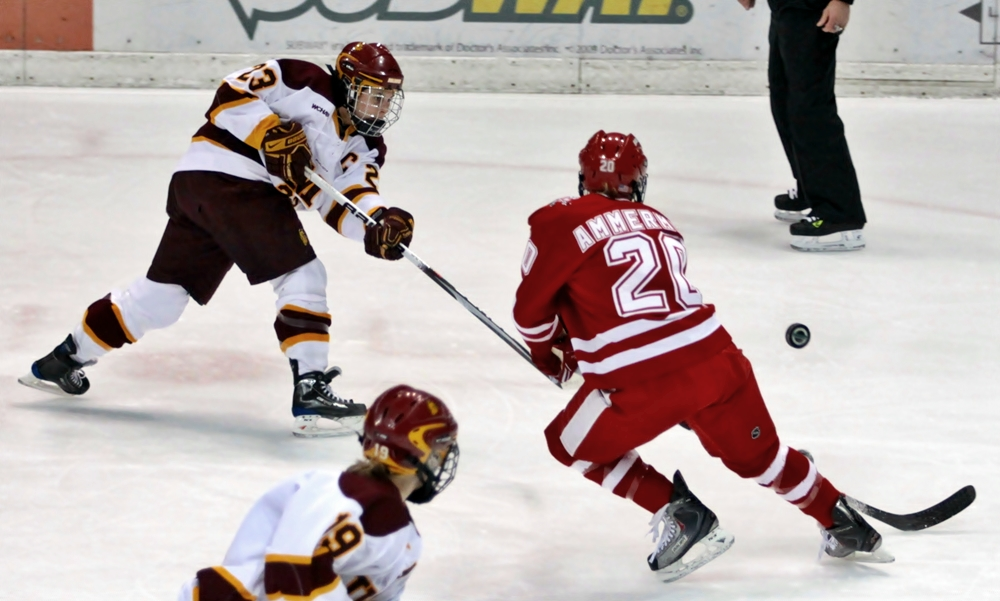
Saara Tuominen playing for Minnesota Duluth against the Wisconsin Badgers in January 2010

== Offseason ==
- May 21: The school has announced that eight players have signed national letters of intent to attend UMD in the fall of 2009. The signees include forward Jessica Wong, goaltender Jennifer Harss, forward Andrea Lanzl, defenseman Mariia Posa and forward and Duluth native Gina Dodge. The five signees will join forward Audrey Belanger-Cournoyer, forward Vanessa Thibault and forward Katherine Wilson (Winnipeg, Manitoba) who all inked letters with the Bulldogs last November.
- June 24: Former Bulldogs hockey player and assistant coach Caroline Ouellette has been selected the Most Valuable Player for the 2008–09 Canadian Women's Hockey League season. Ouellette led her team to a first-place finish with a league-record 25 wins. She led the league with 33 assists
- August 19: Shannon Miller, who has guided the University of Minnesota Duluth women's hockey team to four NCAA national titles, has inked a contract-extension that will keep it that way through 2012–13 season.
- September 9: The WCHA announced that Minnesota Duluth defenseman Jaime Rasmussen and forwards Emmanuelle Blais and Laura Fridfinnson have been named as WCHA All-Stars. The three players are among 22 players from the conference to face the 2009–10 U.S Women's National Team in St. Paul, Minn. on September 25.

== Regular season ==
- October 5: The Minnesota Duluth women's hockey team was ranked No. 6 in the country. The USCHO.com officials revealed it in their first Top-10 Women's Hockey Poll of the season. Minnesota Duluth accumulated 63 points.
- October 31: Number 1 ranked Mercyhurst College suffered its first loss of the season to the hands of fifth-ranked Minnesota Duluth. The Bulldogs skated away to a 4–3 win and a split of the two-game series at the Mercyhurst Ice Center. With the loss, the Lakers fall to 7–1 on the season while the Bulldogs improve to 6–4 overall.
- December 9: Jennifer Harss was named the Co-WCHA Defensive Player of the Week. She made her first appearance in the Kohl Center on Dec. 4 and made 40 saves on 42 shots on goal in a 3–1 loss to Wisconsin. Harss then made 33 saves on December 6 in UMD's 2–2 overtime tie with the host Badgers.
- January 13: Senior Saara Tuominen and freshman Mariia Posa were named to Team Finland's 2010 Olympic roster. Bulldog alum Heidi Pelttari has also been added to the team.
- February 11: Former Bulldog Leah Wrazidlo has been selected as a referee for women's games at the Winter Olympics in Vancouver, British Columbia. As a side note, she became the first woman to referee an international men's hockey game in 2005, as France met Italy on Nov. 12, 2005, in Turin, Italy.
- February 25: Former Bulldogs player Caroline Ouellette (Team Canada assistant captain) and redshirt Bulldogs player Haley Irwin both won gold medals with Team Canada in women's hockey. Ouellette won her third gold medal and became the Bulldog with the most gold medals. Team USA forward Jenny Potter won the silver and became the most decorated Olympic medalist in Bulldogs hockey history. Current Bulldogs Saara Tuominen and Mariia Posa won bronze with Finland. In total, seven active or former Bulldogs won Olympic medals. Alumnus Heidi Pelttari, and Maria Rooth also won bronze with Finland. The Swedish team included former Bulldog Erika Holst and four redshirted Bulldogs. The redshirted Bulldogs representing Sweden were Elin Holmlov, Pernilla Winberg, Jenni Asserholt and Kim Martin.

=== Standings ===
2009–10 Western Collegiate Hockey Association standings
	Conference								Overall					
	GP	W	L	T	SOW	PTS	GF	GA	GP	W	L	T	GF	GA
Minnesota Duluth†*	28	20	6	2	1	43	90	55	41	31	8	2	138	83
Minnesota†	28	18	6	4	3	43	91	49	40	26	9	5	129	74
St. Cloud State	28	11	11	6	4	32	70	77	37	15	14	8	96	103
Wisconsin	28	15	12	1	0	31	84	63	36	18	15	3	107	82
Ohio State	28	12	13	3	1	28	90	94	37	17	15	5	122	117
Bemidji State	28	9	12	7	3	28	47	64	38	12	19	7	65	98
Minnesota State	28	5	18	5	3	18	49	92	34	7	22	5	66	117
North Dakota	28	7	19	2	0	16	44	71	34	8	22	4	61	92
Championship: † indicates conference regular season champion; * indicates conference tournament champion Updated July 21, 2024

=== Roster ===
Number	Name	Position	Height	Class
3	Jocelyne Larocque	D	5–6	Junior
11	Kacy Ambroz	F	5–7	Sophomore
13	Tara Gray	D	5–10	Junior
14	Libby Guzzo	F	5–7	Junior
19	Laura Fridfinnson	F	5–8	Junior
22	Sarah Murray	D	5–3	Senior
23	Saara Tuominen	F	5–6	Senior
24	Gina Dodge	F	5-5	Freshman
26	Heidi Pelttari	D	5–5	Senior
29	Justine Fisher	F	5–4	Sophomore
31	Lana Steck	G	5–6	Sophomore
47	Emmanuelle Blais	F	5–4	Senior
51	Pernilla Winberg	F	5–5	Sophomore
72	Elin Holmlov	F	5–9	Senior
84	Jenni Asserholt	D	5–8	Sophomore
87	Jennifer Harss	G	5-7	Freshman
88	Jaime Rasmussen	D	5–8	Senior

=== Schedule ===
Date	Location	Opponent	Score	Record
Oct. 2	Duluth, MN	Robert Morris	Win, 5–2	1–0–0
Oct. 3	Duluth, MN	Robert Morris	Loss, 4–1	1–1–0
Oct. 10	Duluth, MN	St. Cloud State	Win, 5–3	2–1–0
Oct. 11	Duluth, MN	St. Cloud State	Win, 2–0	3–1–0
Oct. 16	Minneapolis	Minnesota	Loss, 3–1	3–2–0
Oct. 17	Minneapolis	Minnesota	Loss, 3–0	3–3–0
Oct. 23	Duluth, MN	North Dakota	Win, 4–1	4–3–0
Oct. 24	Duluth, MN	North Dakota	Win, 3–1	5–3–0
Oct. 30	Erie, PA	Mercyhurst	Loss, 5–2	5–4–0
Oct. 31	Erie, PA	Mercyhurst	Win, 4–3	6–4–0
Nov. 6	St. Cloud, MN	St. Cloud State	Loss, 5–1	6–5–0
Nov. 7	St. Cloud, MN	St. Cloud State	Win, 5–0	7–5–0
Nov. 13	Columbus, OH	Ohio State	Win, 3–2 (OT)	8–5–0
Nov. 14	Columbus, OH	Ohio State	Win, 5–3	9–5–0
Dec. 12	Duluth, MN	Bemidji State	Win, 4–1	
Dec. 13	Duluth, MN	Bemidji State	Tie, 2–2	
Dec. 12	Bemidji, MN	Bemidji State	Win, 5–2	
Dec. 13	Bemidji, MN	Bemidji State	Win, 3–0	

== Player stats ==
= Indicates team leader

=== Skaters ===
Player	Games	Goals	Assists	Points	Points/game	PIM	GWG	PPG	SHG
Emmanuelle Blais	41	32	33	65	1.5854	40	10	12	2
Laura Fridfinnson	39	23	31	54	1.3846	44	5	4	1
Katherine Wilson	41	17	26	43	1.0488	48	6	3	0
Jessica Wong	41	15	16	31	0.7561	30	3	1	0
Jaime Rasmussen	41	8	22	30	0.7317	54	3	4	0
Audrey Cournoyer	41	9	18	27	0.6585	14	1	3	1
Saara Tuominen	31	9	14	23	0.7419	10	2	1	0
Vanessa Thibault	41	7	8	15	0.3659	30	0	2	1
Jocelyne Larocque	19	3	10	13	0.6842	0	0	2	0
Tara Gray	41	5	7	12	0.2927	56	0	2	0
Mariia Posa	31	2	6	8	0.2581	6	0	1	0
Kacy Ambroz	41	2	5	7	0.1707	14	0	0	0
Sarah Murray	41	2	4	6	0.1463	24	0	0	0
Gina Dodge	41	4	1	5	0.1220	24	1	2	0
Kirsti Hakala	39	0	2	2	0.0513	16	0	0	0
Justine Fisher	22	0	1	1	0.0455	2	0	0	0
Jennifer Harss	39	0	1	1	0.0256	0	0	0	0
Stephanie Lenz	38	0	0	0	0.0000	2	0	0	0
Libby Guzzo	41	0	0	0	0.0000	6	0	0	0
Lana Steck	5	0	0	0	0.0000	0	0	0	0

=== Goaltenders ===
Player	Games	Wins	Losses	Ties	Goals against	Minutes	GAA	Shutouts	Saves	Save %
Lana Steck	5	2	0	0	1	145	0.4134	1	47	.979
Jennifer Harss	39	29	8	2	80	2387	2.0110	5	1138	.934

== Postseason ==
Senior Emmanuelle Blais had 12 points over the last five games of the season, and ended her NCAA career on a five-game scoring streak.

Date	Location	Opponent	Score	Notes
Feb. 26	Heritage Center	North Dakota	6–2	Emmanuelle Blais scores 4 goals
Feb. 27	Heritage Center	North Dakota	3–1	Sweep series

- March 7: The Minnesota Duluth Bulldogs defeated the Minnesota Golden Gophers 3–2 at Ridder Arena in Minneapolis to win the WCHA FINAL FACE-OFF playoff championship. It is the Bulldogs fifth WCHA playoff championship. This was their first postseason victory over the Golden Gophers since 2003. In addition, the Bulldogs lost three previous league playoff games against the Gophers at Ridder Arena.

=== NCAA tournament ===
- March 8: Two teams from the WCHA will compete for the 10th NCAA Women's Ice Hockey Championship. The University of Minnesota will be the host school for the 2010 Frozen Four, to be held March 19 and 21 at Ridder Arena in Minneapolis. WCHA tournament champion University of Minnesota Duluth, and at-large selection Minnesota will be two of eight competing teams.

Minnesota Duluth (28–8–2) is seeded Number 2 and the Bulldogs will host the New Hampshire Wildcats (19–8–5) on Saturday, March 13 at 2:00 pm central standard time. The Golden Gophers (25–8–5) are the number 3 seed, and will host the Clarkson Golden Eagles (23–11–5), on March 13 at 4:00 pm central standard time. Minnesota Duluth won the Frozen Four for the first three years that the tournament was held (2001, 2002 and 2003). The Golden Gophers proceeded to win the next two Frozen Four tournaments (2004 and 2005). Neither team has won since.

- March 13: The Bulldogs earned their fourth consecutive trip to the Frozen Four by defeating the New Hampshire Wildcats women's ice hockey program by a score of 2–1.
- March 21: The Bulldogs defeated Cornell 3–2 in triple overtime to win its fifth NCAA national championship. Jessica Wong scored the game-winning goal. Saara Tuominen and Jaime Rasmussen were the only players to have had two points in the championship game.

== Awards and honors ==
- Emmanuelle Blais, WCHA Offensive Player of the Week (Week of October 26)
- Emmanuelle Blais, Patty Kazmaier Award nominee
- Emmanuelle Blais, 2010 Women's RBK Hockey Division I All-America First Team
- Audrey Cournoyer, WCHA Rookie of the Week (Week of November 9)
- Laura Fridfinnson, Patty Kazmaier Award nominee
- Jennifer Harss, WCHA Co-Defensive Player of the Week (Week of December 7)
- Jaime Rasmussen, WCHA Defensive Player of the Week (Week of October 26)

=== Preseason honors ===
- WCHA Preseason Player of the year finalist: Saara Tuominen, Minnesota Duluth
- WCHA Preseason Rookie of the year finalist: Jennifer Harss, Minnesota Duluth

=== Regular season honors ===
- Katherine Wilson, WCHA Rookie of the Week (Week of October 12)
- Jessica Wong, Minnesota Duluth, WCHA Rookie of the Week(Week of January 20)

=== All-WCHA Team ===
- Emmanuelle Blais, F, All-WCHA First Team
- Jaime Rasmussen, D, All-WCHA First Team
- Jennifer Harss, G, All-WCHA Third Team selection

=== Postseason honors ===
- Emmanuelle Blais, Frozen Four Most Outstanding Player
- Emmanuelle Blais, Frozen Four Tournament Team
- Laura Fridfinnson, Frozen Four Tournament Team
- Jennifer Harss, WCHA Final Face-Off All-Tournament Team 2010
- Jessica Wong, Frozen Four Tournament Team

== Postseason news ==
- Sports Illustrated listed Emmanuelle Blais as one of its "Faces In The Crowd" (in its April 19, 2010 issue). Part of the recognition is attributed to Blais earning the 2010 NCAA Frozen Four's Most Outstanding Player award on March 21. Blais is also a 2009–10 RBK First Team All-American. Her 1.59 points per game was the fifth highest total in the country. Her 32 goals led the NCAA, and she had a career high of 65 points.
- March 22: The Mayor of Duluth Don Ness presented head coach Shannon Miller with a proclamation declaring Friday, March 26, 2010 as "Shannon Miller Day'".
- April 12: Emmanuelle Blais was a co-winner of the University of Minnesota Duluth's Outstanding Female Senior Athlete Award. The award was shared by four winners: the others being Jheri Booker (basketball), Clare Dahmen (soccer) and Kristin Danielson (softball).
- June 7: Jessica Wong was named Nova Scotia's Female Team Athlete of the Year by Sport Nova Scotia. Wong was given the Ricoh Sport Award. She scored a goal to win the 2010 NCAA championship in triple-overtime, and she scored two goals to earn an Under-22 Women's World Championship gold.
