= Jessica Wong =

Canadian ice hockey player

- Born: March 29, 1991 (age 35) Sydney, Nova Scotia, Canada
- Height: 5 ft 7 in (170 cm)
- Weight: 142 lb (64 kg; 10 st 2 lb)
- Position: Defence
- Shoots: Left
- Played for: KRS Vanke Rays; Calgary Inferno; Minnesota Duluth Bulldogs
- National team: China
- Playing career: 2009–present

Wang Yuting
- Traditional Chinese: 王玉婷
- Simplified Chinese: 王玉婷
Transcriptions
Standard Mandarin
- Hanyu Pinyin: Wáng Yùtíng
- Wade–Giles: Wang Yüt'ing
Yue: Cantonese
- Yale Romanization: Wòhng Yuhktìhng

Jessica Wong (born March 29, 1991), also known by the Chinese name Wang Yuting (Chinese: 王玉婷; pinyin: Wáng Yùtíng), is a Canadian ice hockey player, a defenceman. She most recently played with the Chinese national ice hockey team and in the Zhenskaya Hockey League (ZhHL) with the KRS Vanke Rays during the 2021–22 season. She was drafted first overall in the 2013 CWHL Draft by the Calgary Inferno and played four seasons in the Canadian Women's Hockey League (CWHL).

Wong represented China in the women's ice hockey tournament at the 2022 Winter Olympics in Beijing.

== Playing career ==
Wong captained the Warner Warriors in 2006–07, leading the team in scoring and was awarded MVP honors. She played for Nova Scotia at the 2006 Esso Women's Nationals in her hometown of Sydney, Nova Scotia, with a fifth-place finish. Wong also played for Team Atlantic at the 2007 Canadian National Women's Under-18 Championship; the team finished in fourth place. In 2007, she represented Nova Scotia at the 2007 Canada Winter Games, where the team finished in sixth. Wong was also part of three Atlantic Challenge Cups for Nova Scotia, winning two gold medals (2005, 2007) and one silver (2006).

In addition, Wong played for Team Atlantic at the 2008 National Women's Under-18 Championship with an eighth-place finish. In the same year, Wong played with Stoney Creek in Ontario. She won a gold medal with the Stoney Creek Sabres at the Ontario Women's Hockey Association (OWHA) provincials and at the Provincial Women's Hockey League (PWHL) championship in 2008. In 2009, she won a silver medal with Stoney Creek at the OWHA provincials while ranking fourth on the team in scoring.

=== College ===
Wong joined the Minnesota Duluth Bulldogs women's ice hockey program in the Western Collegiate Hockey Association (WCHA) conference of the NCAA Division I in the 2009–10 season. She scored the game-winning goal in triple overtime of the championship final of the 2010 NCAA National Collegiate Women's Ice Hockey Tournament and was named to the All-Tournament Team. Wong finished fourth among Minnesota Duluth rookies in scoring for the 2009–10 season.

During the 2010–11 season, Wong converted from forward to an offensive-defenseman. She finished second in the NCAA among all blueliners with 38 points (15g+23a), averaging a blistering 1.15 points per game. She also led all WCHA defensemen with 31 points in conference play (10g, 21a) and ranked No. 7 in the WCHA with 12 power-play points, as well as 12th for points among all conference players. Wong was named to the 2010–11 All-WCHA Second Team. She finished as the second-leading point scorer among all Bulldog players, netting her first collegiate hat-trick against Connecticut on October 23, 2010.

=== CWHL ===
Wong was selected first overall by the Calgary Inferno in the 2013 CWHL Draft. On February 2, 2014, Wong logged a goal, with Danielle Stone earning an assist (Stone would break two scoring records in Inferno franchise history during that game), providing her with seven points in the first five games of her CWHL career, a new franchise record for the Inferno. Of note, she was selected to participate in the 2014 CWHL All-Star Game, the first in league history. She retired after two seasons to a position with Hockey Canada in Calgary.

In 2017, she came out of retirement to play for the China-based expansion team Kunlun Red Star. The team merged with the Vanke Rays to become the KRS Vanke Rays ahead of the 2018–19 CWHL season.

=== ZhHL ===
In 2018, Wong joined Russia-based Zhenskaya Hockey League (ZhHl) with the KRS Vanke Rays. Across 13 games with the team, she recorded one goal and four assists, finishing with a plus-7 rating .

== International play ==
=== Canada ===
Women's ice hockey

Representing Canada

World U18 Championship
Silver medal – second place	2009 Germany	

MLP Nations Cup
Gold medal – first place	2011 Switzerland	
Gold medal – first place	2010 Germany	

As a junior player with the national under-18 ice hockey team, she participated in the 2009 IIHF U18 Women's World Championship and contributed 12 points (4+8) to Canada's silver medal finish. Wong also represented Canada with the U18 team in a three-game series against the United States in August 2007. The following year, she played with the U18 team in another series against the United States, which was held in Lake Placid, New York.

She graduated to the Canadian national under-22 team (also called the national development team) as part of a three-game series in Calgary in August 2009. Wong won a gold medal with the national under-22 team at the 2010 MLP Nations Cup in Ravensburg, Germany. In August 2010, she suited up for the national under-22 team once more as part of a three-game series versus the United States in Toronto during August 2010. At the 2011 MLP Nations Cup, Wong was part of another gold medal winning squad.

=== China ===
Wong was selected for the Chinese women's national ice hockey team to play at the 2022 Winter Olympics in Beijing, China. She registered a secondary assist on China's first goal in their first game of the tournament, a goal scored by Hannah Miller (Mi Le) against Czechia.

== Awards and honours ==
- 2010 Nova Scotia Sport Female Team Athlete of the Year
- 2010 NCAA National Collegiate Women's Ice Hockey Tournament All-Tournament Team
- Cape Breton Post Athlete of the Year in 2009, 2010, and 2011
- 2011 All-WCHA Second Team

== Career statistics ==
=== Hockey Canada ===
Year	Event	GP	G	A	Pts	PIM
2007	Exhibition vs. USA Under 18	2	0	0	0	0
2008	Exhibition vs. USA Under 18	3	0	1	1	0
2009	Under 22 Selection Camp	2	0	1	1	0
2010	2010 MLP Cup	4	2	0	2	0
2010	Exhibition vs. USA Under 22	3	1	0	1	2

=== Minnesota Duluth ===
Year	GP	G	A	Pts	PIM	PPG	SHG	GWG
2009–10	41	15	16	31	30	1	0	3
2010–11	33	15	23	38	37	3	0	1
2011–12	36	11	19	30	32	2	1	2
2012–13	33	7	16	23	22	1	0	2
Total	143	48	74	122	121	7	1	8

=== CWHL ===
Year	Team	Games Played	Goals	Assists	Points	+/-	PIM	PPG	SHG	GWG
2013–14	Calgary Inferno	12	2	7	9	+7	14	0	0	0
2014–15	Calgary Inferno	24	2	11	13	+7	14	0	0	0

=== International ===
Year	Team	Event	Result	GP	G	A	Pts	PIM
2009	Canada U18	WW18	2nd place, silver medalist(s)	5	4	8	12	0
2022	China	OG	9th	4	0	2	2	0

Awards and achievements
Preceded by Hillary Pattenden	CWHL first overall draft pick 2013	Succeeded by Laura Fortino
