= 2009–10 St. Cloud State Huskies women's ice hockey season =

- Conference: WCHA
- Home ice: Herb Brooks National Hockey Center

Rankings
- USA Today/USA Hockey Magazine: Not ranked
- USCHO.com/CBS College Sports: Not ranked

Record
- Overall: 15-14-8

Coaches and captains
- Head coach: Jeff Giesen
- Captain: Felicia Nelson
- Alternate captain(s): Danielle Hirsch, Holly Roberts, Caitlin Hogan

The 2009-10 St. Cloud State Huskies women's ice hockey season saw the team coached by Jeff Giesen. Giesen was assisted by Jennifer Kranz, Jason Johnson, and Ian Andersen, and the strength and conditioning coach was Travis Zins. During this season, Felicia Nelson became the first Huskies player to be a Top 10 finalist for the Patty Kazmaier Award. The club had a 15-14-8 overall record and an 11-11-6 mark in the WCHA. The team finished the season in third place. This was the first time in school and league history that St. Cloud State was one of the top three schools in the standings.

== Offseason ==
- September 9: The WCHA announced that St. Cloud State goaltender Ashley Nixon, defenseman Danielle Hirsch and forwards Caitlin Hogan and Holly Roberts were named as WCHA All-Stars. The four players were among 22 players from the conference to face the 2009–10 United States women's national ice hockey team in St. Paul, Minn. on September 25.

== Exhibition ==
Date	Opponent	Time	Score
Sept 26	Team USA	7:07 pm	USA, 13-0

== Regular season ==
- Oct 30-31: Meaghan Pezon scored two goals and assisted on two other for four points in the first game of the series (Oct. 30) versus North Dakota. It was a new personal career-high points total in a single game for Pezon. On Oct. 31, Pezon came back to produce assists on each of St. Cloud State's first two goals in a 3-2 victory over the Sioux. It was the team's first league win of the season.

=== Standings ===
2009–10 Western Collegiate Hockey Association standings
	Conference								Overall					
	GP	W	L	T	SOW	PTS	GF	GA	GP	W	L	T	GF	GA
Minnesota Duluth†*	28	20	6	2	1	43	90	55	41	31	8	2	138	83
Minnesota†	28	18	6	4	3	43	91	49	40	26	9	5	129	74
St. Cloud State	28	11	11	6	4	32	70	77	37	15	14	8	96	103
Wisconsin	28	15	12	1	0	31	84	63	36	18	15	3	107	82
Ohio State	28	12	13	3	1	28	90	94	37	17	15	5	122	117
Bemidji State	28	9	12	7	3	28	47	64	38	12	19	7	65	98
Minnesota State	28	5	18	5	3	18	49	92	34	7	22	5	66	117
North Dakota	28	7	19	2	0	16	44	71	34	8	22	4	61	92
Championship: † indicates conference regular season champion; * indicates conference tournament champion Updated July 21, 2024

=== Roster ===
Number	Name	Position	Height	Class
2	Katherine Allen	D	5-3	FY
4	Jenaca Fredheim	D	5-4	Sr.
5	Diana Karouzos	D	5-5	Jr.
6	Holly Roberts -A	F	5-6	Sr.
8	Ashlan Lambert	D	5-5	Jr.
9	Alecia Anderson	F	5-10	Jr.
10	Kylie Lane	F	5-5	FY
11	Courtney Josefson	F	5-2	Jr.
12	Alexandra Nelson	F	5-9	FY
13	Felicia Nelson -C	F	5-7	Sr.
14	Brittany Toor	F	5-5	So.
15	Meaghan Pezon	F	5-6	Sr.
16	Danielle Hirsch - A	D	5-2	Sr.
17	Kelly Meierhofer	D	5-9	Sr.
18	Callie Dahl	F	5-4	FY
19	Haylea Schmid	F	5-7	FY
20	Katie Kemmerer	F	5-1	Sr.
21	Elizabeth Sitek	F	5-7	FY
22	Lisa Martinson	D	5-5	FY
24	Jocelyn Zabrick	D	5-5	FY
25	Caitlin Hogan - A	F	5-2	Sr.
27	Jaclyn Daggit	D	5-6	So.
29	Tayler VanDenakker	G	5-8	So.
30	Anna Donlan	G	5-8	So.
37	Ashley Nixon	G	5-6	Jr.

=== Schedule ===
- St. Cloud will compete in the Easton Holiday Showcase from January 2–3.

Date	Opponent	Time	Score	Record
Oct 2	Niagara University	7:07	Win, 4-3	1-0-0
Oct 3	Niagara University	4:07 pm	Loss, 3-1	1-1-0
Oct 10-11(Sat-Sun)	at Minnesota Duluth	6:07/3:07 pm		
Oct 23 (Fri)	Minnesota	2:07 pm		
Oct 24 (Sat)	at Minnesota	4:07 pm		
Oct 30-31(Fri-Sat)	North Dakota	7:07/2:07 pm		
Nov 6-7 (Fri-Sat)	Minnesota Duluth	7:07/7:07 pm		
Nov 13 (Fri)	at Bemidji State	7:07	0-1	
Nov 14(Sat)	at Bemidji State	2:07 pm	5-2	
Nov 20-21(Fri-Sat)	Wisconsin	2:07/2:07 pm		
Nov 27-28 (Fri-Sat)	at Brown University	2:00/11:00 EST.		
Dec 4 (Fri)	at Minnesota State	7:07 pm		
Dec 5 (Sat)	Minnesota State Mankato	7:07 pm		
Dec 11-12 (Fri-Sat)	Ohio State	2:07/1:07 pm		
Jan 2 (Sat)	Providence	12:07 pm	0-2	
Jan 3 (Sun)	Mercuryhurst	12:07 pm		
Jan 15-16 (Fri-Sat)	at North Dakota	7:07/4:07 pm		
Jan 22-23 (Fri-Sat)	at Wisconsin	2:07/2:07 pm		
Jan 29 (Fri)	Bemidji State	7:07 pm	3-2	
Jan 30 (Sat)	Bemidji State	2:07 pm	3-3	
Feb 5 (Fri)	Minnesota State Mankato	2:07 pm		
Feb 7 (Sun)	at Minnesota State Mankato	3:07 pm		
Feb 12 (Fri)	Minnesota	7:07 pm		
Feb 13 (Sat)	Minnesota	2:07 pm		
Feb 19-20 (Fri-Sat)	at Ohio State	7:07/2:07 EST pm		
Feb 26-28 (Fri –Sun)	WCHA First Round	TBA		

== Player stats ==
= Indicates team leader

=== Skaters ===
Player	Games	Goals	Assists	Points	Points/game	PIM	GWG	PPG	SHG
Holly Roberts	37	21	28	49	1.3243	34	3	9	3
Felicia Nelson	34	31	15	46	1.3529	28	4	15	0
Caitlin Hogan	37	16	27	43	1.1622	55	1	5	3
Meaghan Pezon	37	12	26	38	1.0270	22	3	4	0
Danielle Hirsch	32	1	14	15	0.4688	51	0	1	0
Alex Nelson	37	6	6	12	0.3243	14	1	3	0
Brittany Toor	36	3	7	10	0.2778	18	1	1	0
Lisa Martinson	30	2	4	6	0.2000	28	1	2	0
Kylie Lane	37	1	5	6	0.1622	32	0	1	0
Kelly Meierhofer	37	1	4	5	0.1351	32	0	0	0
Jaclyn Daggit	28	1	3	4	0.1429	6	0	1	0
Callie Dahl	33	1	3	4	0.1212	22	1	0	0
Jocelyn Zabrick	32	0	4	4	0.1250	34	0	0	0
Katie Allen	34	0	3	3	0.0882	0	0	0	0
Diana Karouzos	20	0	3	3	0.1500	18	0	0	0
Tayler VanDenakker	6	0	1	1	0.1667	2	0	0	0
Haylea Schmid	31	0	1	1	0.0323	0	0	0	0
Jenaca Fredheim	10	0	1	1	0.1000	8	0	0	0
Alecia Anderson	34	0	0	0	0.0000	12	0	0	0
Ellie Sitek	20	0	0	0	0.0000	4	0	0	0
Ashlan Lambert	1	0	0	0	0.0000	0	0	0	0
Ashley Nixon	33	0	0	0	0.0000	6	0	0	0
Courtney Josefson	33	0	0	0	0.0000	8	0	0	0
Katie Kemmerer	36	0	0	0	0.0000	2	0	0	0

=== Goaltenders ===
Player	Games	Wins	Losses	Ties	Goals against	Minutes	GAA	Shutouts	Saves	Save %
Ashley Nixon	33	13	10	8	82	1938	2.5383	2	1020	.926
Tayler VanDenakker	6	2	4	0	20	310	3.8678	0	147	.880

== Awards and honors ==
- Caitlin Hogan, Patty Kazmaier Award nominee
- Caitlin Hogan, WCHA Student Athlete of the Year
- Caitlin Hogan, Frozen Four Skills Competition participant
- Felicia Nelson, Patty Kazmaier Award nominee
- Felicia Nelson, WCHA Offensive Player of the Week (Week of January 4)
- Felicia Nelson, Co-WCHA Player of the Year
- Felicia Nelson, 2010 Women's RBK Hockey Division I All-America Second Team
- Ashley Nixon, WCHA Co-Defensive Players of the Week (Week of January 20)
- Meaghan Pezon, WCHA Offensive Player of the Week (Week of November 2)
