= Shannon Szabados =

Canadian ice hockey player

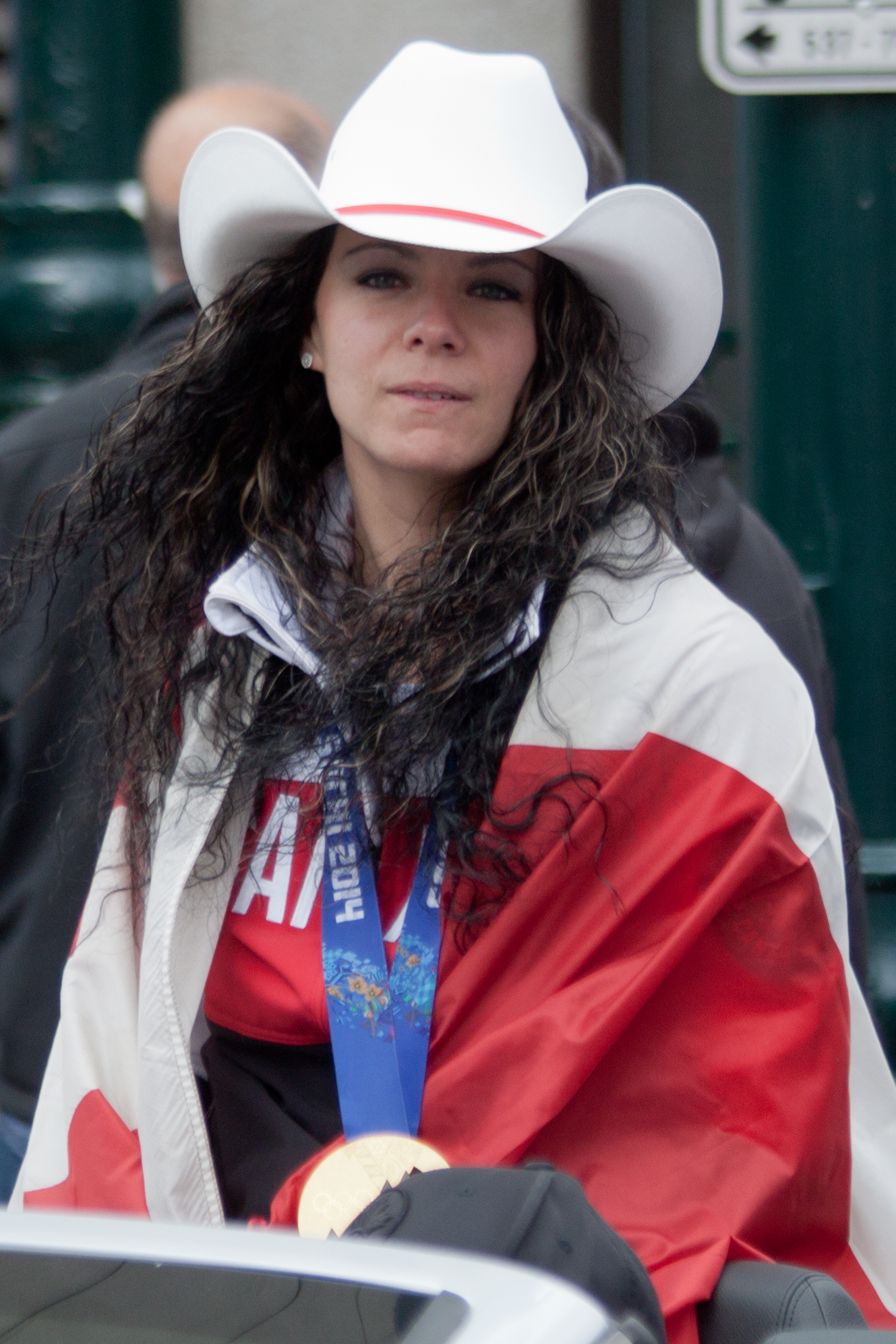
- Szabados during the Parade of Champions in downtown Calgary, Alberta on June 6, 2014
- Born: August 6, 1986 (age 40) Edmonton, Alberta, Canada
- Height: 5 ft 8 in (173 cm)
- Weight: 141 lb (64 kg; 10 st 1 lb)
- Position: Goaltender
- Catches: Left
- team Former teams: PWHPA; Buffalo Beauts; Grant MacEwan Griffins; NAIT Ooks; Columbus Cottonmouths; Peoria Rivermen; Fort Saskatchewan Chiefs
- National team: Canada
- Playing career: 2007–present
Medal record
Olympic Games
| Gold medal – first place | 2010 Vancouver | Team |
| Gold medal – first place | 2014 Sochi | Team |
| Silver medal – second place | 2018 Pyeongchang | Team |
World Championships
| Gold medal – first place | 2012 United States |
| Silver medal – second place | 2009 Finland |
| Silver medal – second place | 2011 Switzerland |
| Silver medal – second place | 2013 Canada |
| Silver medal – second place | 2017 United States |
| Bronze medal – third place | 2019 Finland |

Shannon Lynn Szabados (English: /ˈzæbədɒs/; Hungarian: [ˈsɒbɒdoʃ]; born August 6, 1986) is a Canadian professional ice hockey goaltender for the PWHPA and the Canada women's national ice hockey team.

Szabados had played for the MacEwan University Griffins and the NAIT Ooks men's hockey teams of the Alberta Colleges Athletics Conference from 2007 until 2013. Szabados has been the first female player at several different tournaments and in several leagues, including minor, junior, and professional hockey. While playing junior hockey, Szabados became the first female to appear in the Western Hockey League (WHL) where she played exhibition games for the Tri-City Americans. Szabados was also the first female to play in the Alberta Junior Hockey League (AJHL), and recorded a shutout in her first game. After the 2006–07 season, Szabados was named the AJHL's Top Goaltender. During the 2013–14 season, Szabados became the first woman to both sign and play in the Southern Professional Hockey League.

Szabados represented Canada internationally at the 2010, 2014, and 2018 Winter Olympics. She was in goal during Canada's gold medal wins over the United States in 2010 and 2014. After the 2010 tournament, she was named Top Goaltender and was selected to the Tournament All-Star Team.

On November 21, 2014, Szabados made 34 saves to become the first female goaltender to win an SPHL game when the Cottonmouths defeated the Fayetteville FireAntz 5–4 in overtime. On December 27, 2015, Szabados became the first woman to record a shutout in a men's professional hockey league, in a 33-save, 3–0 win for the Cottonmouths over the Huntsville Havoc.

== Hockey career ==
=== Minor ===
At nine years old, Szabados became the first girl to play in the Brick Super Novice Tournament held at the West Edmonton Mall. In 2001, at the age of 15, she was the first female to play in the Calgary Mac's AAA midget hockey tournament, suiting up for the Edmonton Maple Leaf Athletic Club. Among the competition at the Mac's tournament when Szabados played were the Shattuck-St. Mary's Sabres led by Zach Parise.

=== Junior ===
In 2002, at the age of 16, she became the first female to play in the Western Hockey League (WHL). Szabados played in four exhibition games for the Tri-City Americans. During her time in the Americans' training camp, Szabados split an exhibition game with former Montreal Canadiens netminder Carey Price. Szabados recalls, "...he let in four goals in the half he played; I let in two and one in overtime." When she was released from Tri-City, Szabados returned to Alberta to play in the Alberta Junior Hockey League (AJHL), after a vote among the league's general managers regarding female players.

In her first game with the AJHL's Sherwood Park Crusaders on October 2, 2002, Szabados recorded a shutout in addition to winning the game. During her AJHL career, Szabados spent time with the Crusaders as well as the Bonnyville Pontiacs and the Fort Saskatchewan Traders. While playing for Sherwood Park, Szabados played in the AJHL All-Star game, and was named co-MVP of the 2004–05 game. After the season, she was named co-MVP of the Sherwood Park club as well. During the 2006–07 season, Szabados led the Traders to the top record in the AJHL and came within a game of winning the AJHL championship against the Camrose Kodiaks. She was named to the AJHL North Division All-Star Team for the 2007 All-Star Weekend. Szabados was the recipient of the Friends of Alberta Junior Hockey League Trophy as the AJHL's Top Goaltender after the 2006–07 season, becoming the first female recipient of the award. She was also named MVP of the Fort Saskatchewan club.

=== Collegiate ===
Because Szabados spent time in a WHL training camp, she was ineligible to play in the National Collegiate Athletic Association (NCAA), which is a common path for female hockey players. Instead, Szabados played for the men's team at MacEwan University in Alberta. Szabados spent two full seasons playing with Grant MacEwan (2007–08 and 2008–09) before leaving to join Hockey Canada's program as they assembled the Olympic team. During the 2007–08 season, Szabados helped Grant MacEwan to a silver medal at the 2008 Alberta College Athletic Conference (ACAC). She is returned to the Griffins for the 2010–11 season.

For the 2011–12 season, Szabados transferred to the Northern Alberta Institute of Technology and suited up with the NAIT Ooks. In her second season with the team, she set the regular season record for shutouts (5) en route to an ACAC Championship.

=== International ===
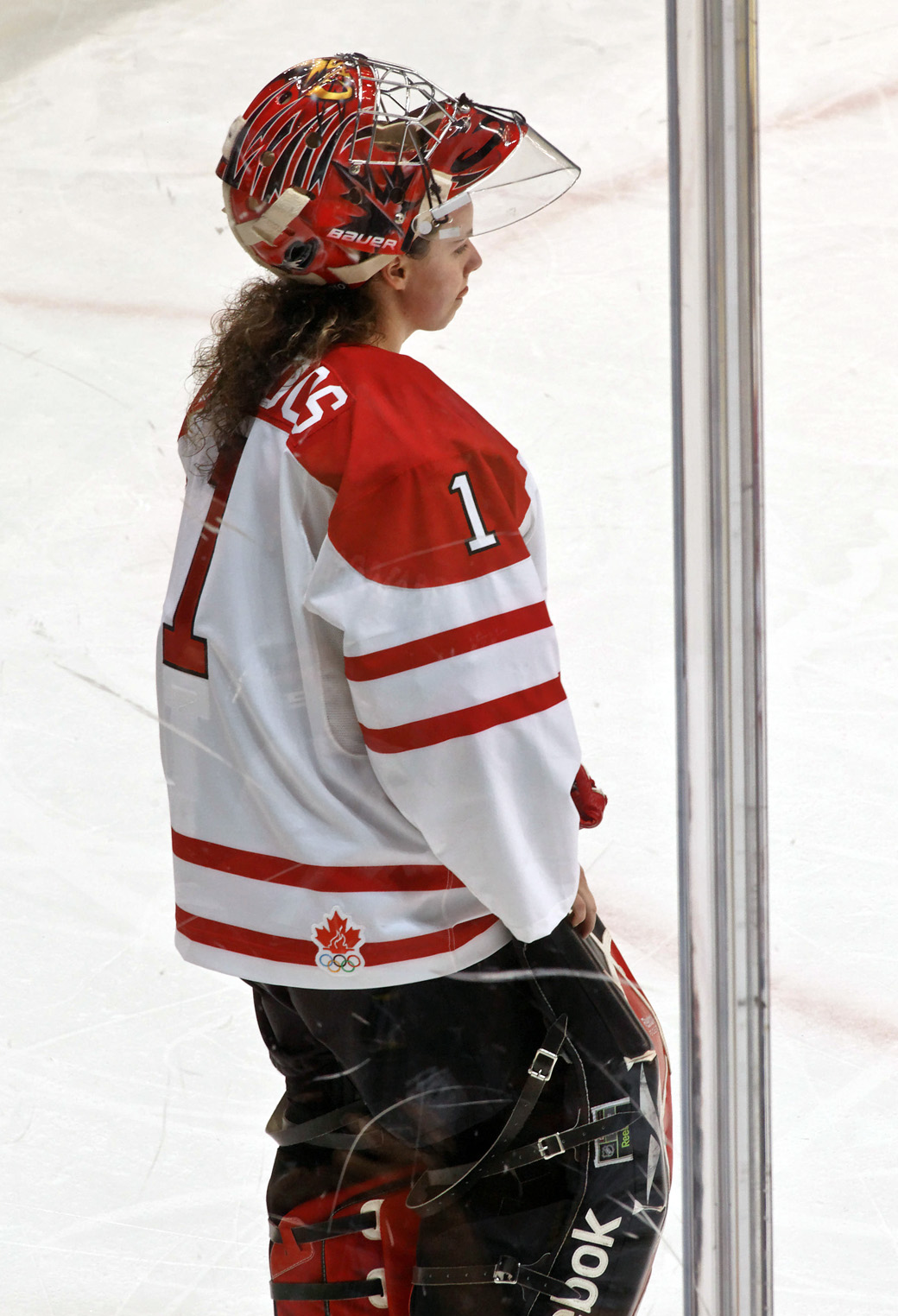
Shannon Szabados prepares for the gold medal game against the United States at the 2010 Winter Olympics

Szabados has represented Canada internationally at the Under-22 and Senior levels. She made her Team Canada debut in 2006, winning gold at the 4 Nations Cup in Kitchener, Ontario. In the opening game of the tournament, Szabados recorded a 3–0 shutout against the United States. Szabados also made her debut with Canada's Under-22 women's team in 2006. She won three straight gold medals at the Air Canada Cup between 2006 and 2008.

Szabados served as an alternate for Team Canada at the 2008 IIHF World Women's Championships, and was named to the roster in 2009, but did not play. In 2009, Szabados represented Canada at the 4 Nations Cup, where she played in the gold medal game and recorded a 5–1 victory over the United States.

Szabados was expected to be Canada's third goalie heading into the 2010 Winter Olympics, behind veterans Kim St. Pierre and Charline Labonté. In pre-tournament play, including a series of games against midget boys teams from Alberta, Szabados posted the best numbers of the three. Her record against the midget boys was 10–1, with a 1.99 goals against average and .936 save percentage. She also posted three wins against the American women's team leading up to the Olympics, including the 4 Nations Cup.

She was a member of the 2009–10 Hockey Canada national women's team which won the gold medal at the 2010 Winter Olympics and earned two shutouts, including the final game against the United States women's national ice hockey team. She was selected to the tournament all-star team at the Olympics, and was named top goaltender. In a March 31, 2012, exhibition game versus the United States, Szabados made 24 saves in a 1–0 shutout win at the Ottawa Civic Centre.

During the 2014 Winter Olympics in Sochi, Russia, Szabados was a member of the Canadian women's hockey team again. She would win all three of her starts, including the gold medal game in overtime to win her second straight Olympic gold medal.

In the 2018 Winter Olympics Szabados was again in goal for the gold medal game against Team USA. Tied after regulation and an overtime period, the game went into shootout, which Canada lost to the U.S. who won the gold. The loss ended the team's streak of four consecutive gold medals won since 2002. Szabados was the tournament's leading goaltender with a 94.94% save percentage and was awarded tournament's Best Goaltender.

=== Professional ===
In March 2010, there was a movement by some in the Edmonton media for the Edmonton Oilers to consider signing Szabados when goaltender Devan Dubnyk came down with the flu prior to a game against the Vancouver Canucks, leaving the Oilers with only one goaltender and in need of an emergency backup. Instead, Calgary Dinos goaltender Nathan Deobald was signed to an amateur tryout contract, prompting journalists including the Edmonton Sun's Terry Jones to criticize the club's move.

A similar situation occurred on March 4, 2014, when a campaign was launched on Twitter to have Szabados as an emergency backup goaltender to Ben Scrivens for the Edmonton Oilers game against the Ottawa Senators, as their new goaltender, Viktor Fasth, would not arrive till the next day, after being traded to Edmonton that day. Edmonton opted for UofA Golden Bears goaltender Kurtis Mucha instead. The Oilers invited Szabados to practice with them the next day, while they waited for Fasth to arrive.

On March 7, 2014, it was announced that Szabados had been signed to a professional contract with the Columbus Cottonmouths of the Southern Professional Hockey League (SPHL) to finish out the 2013–14 season, to become the first female to play with a SPHL team. She joins the likes of Manon Rhéaume, Danielle Dube, and Hayley Wickenheiser as Canadian women's national team members to play men's professional hockey. Szabados dressed for her first game on March 13, 2014, but did not play in the game. On March 15, Szabados started her first game with the Cottonmouths, stopping 27 of 31 shots in a 4–3 loss to the Knoxville Ice Bears. On November 21, 2014, Szabados made 34 saves to become the first female goaltender to win a SPHL game when the Cottonmouths defeated the Fayetteville FireAntz 5–4 in overtime. In 2015, in a 3–0 win for the Cottonmouths over the Huntsville Havoc, Szabados became the first woman to record a shutout in a men's professional hockey league.

==== NWHL ====
On June 27, 2018, Szabados signed a contract with the NWHL’s Buffalo Beauts. Along with Lee Stecklein, Szabados was named one of the team captains for the 4th NWHL All-Star Game.

== Personal life ==
Her parents' names are Gary and Sharyl, and she has one brother named Matthew. She is of Hungarian descent; her last name, Szabados, is an old Hungarian status term meaning "liberated", as it referred to a person freed from serfdom.

She majored in physical education at MacEwan University.

Szabados was teammates and friends with Canadian sledge hockey player Matt Cook during her time in the AJHL. At the 2010 Olympics in Vancouver, Szabados had "FLM" on her goalie mask, for "Fight like Matt" in Cook's honour.

She was on the cover of Hello! Canada in March 2010.

Szabados married Carl Nielsen, a former college and minor pro defenceman, in September 2019. In March 2020, she announced that the couple was expecting a baby girl, who was born August 20, 2020, a daughter named Shaylyn. She was previously married to Alex Ritchie, a former junior goalie.

In December 2020, she announced the publication of a children's book written and illustrated by her, titled Every Bunny Loves to Play.

== Statistics ==
=== Regular season ===
AJHL stats and ACAC stats

| Season | Team | League | GP | W | L | T | OTL | MIN | GA | SO | GAA | SV% |
|---|---|---|---|---|---|---|---|---|---|---|---|---|
| 2001–02 | MLAC Maple Leafs | AMHL | 35 | | | | | | | | 2.45 | 0.914 |
| 2002–03 | MLAC Maple Leafs | AMHL | 29 | | | | | | | | 3.27 | 0.903 |
| 2002–03 | Sherwood Park Crusaders | AJHL | 9 | 7 | 1 | 0 | – | 452 | 18 | 2 | 2.39 | 0.900 |
| 2002–03 | Tri-City Americans | WHL | 1 | 0 | 0 | 0 | 0 | 1 | 0 | 0 | 0.00 | 0.000 |
| 2003–04 | Sherwood Park Crusaders | AJHL | 27 | 13 | 9 | 2 | – | 1436 | 64 | 2 | 2.67 | 0.911 |
| 2004–05 | Sherwood Park Crusaders | AJHL | 42 | 9 | 24 | 5 | – | 2310 | 133 | 0 | 3.45 | 0.910 |
| 2005–06 | Sherwood Park Crusaders | AJHL | 1 | 0 | 1 | 0 | – | 20 | 3 | 0 | 9.00 | 0.833 |
| 2005–06 | Bonnyville Pontiacs | AJHL | 40 | 26 | 9 | 1 | – | 2220 | 111 | 0 | 3.00 | 0.896 |
| 2006–07 | Fort Saskatchewan Traders | AJHL | 43 | 31 | 7 | 4 | – | 2508 | 89 | 4 | 2.13 | 0.920 |
| 2007–08 | MacEwan Griffins | ACAC | 17 | 12 | 4 | – | 1 | 1010 | 51 | 0 | 3.03 | 0.894 |
| 2008–09 | MacEwan Griffins | ACAC | 22 | 6 | 14 | – | 1 | 1287 | 92 | 1 | 4.29 | 0.895 |
| 2010–11 | MacEwan Griffins | ACAC | 18 | 2 | 13 | 2 | – | 996 | 87 | 0 | 5.24 | 0.884 |
| 2011–12 | NAIT Ooks | ACAC | 17 | 7 | 7 | 2 | – | 965 | 40 | 2 | 2.49 | 0.909 |
| 2012–13 | NAIT Ooks | ACAC | 17 | 15 | 2 | 0 | – | 1023 | 27 | 5 | 1.58 | 0.916 |
| 2013–14 | Columbus Cottonmouths | SPHL | 2 | 0 | 2 | – | 0 | 118:13 | 7 | 0 | 3.55 | 0.894 |
| 2014–15 | Columbus Cottonmouths | SPHL | 25 | 15 | 9 | – | 1 | 1478:50 | 77 | 0 | 3.12 | 0.907 |
| 2015–16 | Columbus Cottonmouths | SPHL | 22 | 5 | 11 | – | 5 | 1238:28 | 75 | 1 | 3.63 | 0.910 |
| 2016–17 | Peoria Rivermen | SPHL | 2 | 0 | 1 | – | 0 | 49:10 | 5 | 0 | 6.10 | 0.792 |
| 2016–17 | Fort Saskatchewan Chiefs | ChNL | 1 | 1 | 0 | 0 | – | 60:00 | 4 | 0 | 4.00 | 0.930 |

=== Playoffs ===
| Season | Team | League | GP | W | L | T | OTL | MIN | GA | SO | GAA | SV% |
|---|---|---|---|---|---|---|---|---|---|---|---|---|
| 2003–04 | Sherwood Park Crusaders | AJHL | 2 | 0 | 0 | – | – | 84 | 5 | 0 | 3.56 | – |
| 2005–06 | Bonnyville Pontiacs | AJHL | 1 | 0 | 0 | – | – | 20 | 3 | 0 | 9.00 | 0.813 |
| 2006–07 | Fort Saskatchewan Traders | AJHL | 15 | 10 | 5 | – | – | 907 | 29 | 0 | 1.92 | 0.923 |
| 2007–08 | MacEwan Griffins | ACAC | 9 | 5 | 2 | – | 2 | 569 | 26 | 0 | 2.74 | 0.908 |
| 2011–12 | NAIT Ooks | ACAC | 6 | 3 | 3 | – | 0 | 356 | 13 | 0 | 2.19 | 0.915 |
| 2012–13 | NAIT Ooks | ACAC | 7 | 6 | 0 | – | 0 | 384 | 12 | 0 | 1.87 | 0.930 |
| 2013–14 | Columbus Cottonmouths | SPHL | 1 | 0 | 0 | – | 0 | 23 | 3 | 0 | 7.80 | 0.750 |

=== International ===
| Season | Team | Tournament | GP | W | L | T | OTL | MIN | GA | SO | GAA | SV% |
|---|---|---|---|---|---|---|---|---|---|---|---|---|
| 2006 | Canada U22 | ACC | 2 | 1 | 1 | 0 | – | 119 | 6 | 0 | 3.03 | 0.872 |
| 2006 | Canada | 4NC | 2 | 2 | 0 | 0 | – | 120 | 1 | 1 | 0.50 | 0.971 |
| 2007 | Canada U22 | ACC | 2 | 2 | 0 | 0 | – | 120 | 1 | 1 | 0.50 | 0.958 |
| 2007 | Canada | 4NC | 3 | 3 | 0 | 0 | – | 180 | 4 | 1 | 1.33 | 0.942 |
| 2008 | Canada U22 | ACC | 2 | 2 | 0 | 0 | – | 120 | 5 | 1 | 2.53 | 0.900 |
| 2009 | Canada | HC Cup | 2 | 1 | 1 | 0 | – | 120 | 4 | 1 | 2.00 | 0.889 |
| 2009 | Canada | 4NC | 2 | 2 | 0 | 0 | – | 120 | 3 | 0 | 1.50 | 0.923 |
| 2010 | Canada | Oly | 3 | 3 | 0 | – | 0 | 180 | 1 | 2 | 0.33 | 0.980 |
| 2010 | Canada | 4NC | 3 | 2 | 1 | 0 | – | 186 | 4 | 1 | 1.29 | 0.937 |
| 2011 | Canada | WWC | 2 | 1 | 1 | 0 | – | 127 | 3 | 1 | 1.42 | 0.953 |
| 2011 | Canada | 4NC | 3 | 2 | 1 | 0 | – | 190 | 5 | 1 | 1.58 | 0.949 |
| 2012 | Canada | WWC | 4 | 3 | 0 | 0 | – | 198 | 9 | 0 | 2.72 | 0.894 |
| 2012 | Canada | 4NC | 2 | 2 | 0 | 0 | – | 47 | 0 | 2 | 0.00 | 1.000 |
| 2013 | Canada | WWC | 4 | 3 | 1 | 0 | – | 244 | 6 | 1 | 1.48 | 0.936 |
| 2013 | Canada | 4NC | 1 | 1 | 0 | – | 0 | 60 | 3 | 0 | 3.00 | 0.727 |
| 2014 | Canada | Oly | 3 | 3 | 0 | – | 0 | 187 | 3 | 1 | 0.96 | 0.954 |
| 2017 | Canada | WWC | 4 | | | | | | | | 1.21 | 0.954 |

== Awards and honours ==
- 2007 Alberta Junior Hockey League Top Goaltender Award
- Vancouver 2010 Olympics, Media All-Star Team
- Vancouver 2010 Olympics, Directorate Award, Best Goaltender
- 2013 Northern Alberta Institute of Technology Athletic Director Award for Excellence
- SPHL Player of the Week (2 times; November 24–30, 2014, March 16–22, 2015)
