= 2009–10 Canada women's national ice hockey team =

2009–10 Hockey Canada women's ice hockey season

Four Nations Cup Champions Olympic Gold Medal MLP Cup champions IIHF Under 18 champions
- Conference: IIHF
- Home ice: Father David Bauer Arena

Record
- Overall: 30-11

Coaches and captains
- Head coach: Melody Davidson
- Assistant coaches: Doug Lidster; Peter Smith
- Captain: Hayley Wickenheiser
- Alternate captain(s): Jayna Hefford, Caroline Ouellette

The 2009–10 women's national hockey team represented Canada at the 2010 Winter Olympic Games. Prior to the games, the national team participated in several tournaments during the 2009–10 season. The team won the gold medal at the 2010 Winter Olympics in Vancouver. The head coach was Melody Davidson, and she was assisted by Peter Smith and former Vancouver Canucks player Doug Lidster.

== News and notes ==
- April 17, 2009: Dawson Creek, British Columbia was selected to host the National Women's team's conditioning camp from May 25 to June 17. The team was based at the EnCana Events Centre in Dawson Creek for the 24-day camp. Twenty-six players were invited for centralization and were competing for 21 roster spots for the team that would compete in ice hockey at the 2010 Winter Olympics.
- September 1, 2009: Hayley Wickenheiser became the first player on the Canadian women's hockey team to break the 300 career-point barrier Tuesday in Canada's 10–2 win over Finland at the Canada Cup.
- September 21, 2009: The women's team's performance at the 2002 Winter Games was voted by fans as the No. 2 Canadian Olympic Winter Games moment of all time. The 3–2 win over the United States gave Canada its first gold medal in women's hockey, and a measure of revenge for the loss to the Americans four years earlier in Nagano, Japan. The accomplishment will be featured on a Canadian circulation coin to be released on November 17, 2009. The artist of the coin is Jason Bouwman.
- On February 5, Hayley Wickenheiser made news when she put a teenage Dane Phaneuf in a headlock. Phaneuf plays for the Edmonton South Side Athletics, 15 to 17year old boys from the Alberta Midget Hockey League. Phaneuf's older brother, Dion plays in the National Hockey League. The reason for the headlock was that there were concerns about Phaneuf's aggressive play. The video highlight of the headlock made national news.
- Melody Davidson revealed after the gold medal game that the team left the Olympic Village for two exhibition games against the Vancouver Northwest Giants boys AAA midget team during the Olympics. The first game was held the night before the opening ceremonies. The final game was on February 19.
- February 26: The International Olympic Committee announced that it would investigate the after ice celebration of several Canadian women's hockey players. The cause for the investigation is the concern about the use of beer and cigars on the ice in Vancouver. Another cause for concern was 18-year-old Marie-Philip Poulin was drinking alcohol on the ice (the legal drinking age in British Columbia is 19.) The team had been on the ice for more than 70 minutes after the medal ceremony (only media and arena staff were present). The antics drew heavy criticism from within, and outside of, Canada, but also considerable support from Canadian fans..
- February 28: After winning the gold medal, Canada has once again earned the number one ranking in the IIHF Women's World Ranking. Canada's men are also ranked first in the IIHF Men's World Ranking.
- April 12:Meghan Agosta, Jayna Hefford and Cherie Piper were among thirteen Canadian Olympic medallists attending the home opener of the 2010 Toronto Blue Jays season on Monday, April 12 versus the Chicago White Sox. The medallists will enjoy a meet and greet with the Blue Jays players at a pre-game batting practice and participate in the Ceremonial First Pitch.

- June 28:The Canadian men's and women's hockey teams picked up rings commemorating their double gold victory in Vancouver. The rings are diamond-encrusted with the Olympic logo in the centre. The rings were handed out as part of Hockey Canada's "Canada Celebrates" ceremony in the Alberta capital.

== Hockey cards ==
- Various members of the national team are featured in the 2009-10 O-Pee-Chee Hockey Card set, distributed by Upper Deck. The checklist is as follows:

Card number	Player
CB-BK	Becky Kellar
CB-CL	Charline Labonté
CB-CM	Carla MacLeod
CB-CO	Caroline Ouellette
CB-CS	Colleen Sostorics
CB-CW	Catherine Ward
CB-GA	Gillian Apps
CB-GF	Gillian Ferrari
CB-GK	Gina Kingsbury
CB-HI	Haley Irwin
CB-HW	Hayley Wickenheiser
CB-JB	Jennifer Botterill
CB-JH	Jayna Hefford
CB-KS	Kim St-Pierre
CB-MA	Meghan Agosta
CB-MM	Meaghan Mikkelson
CB-MP	Marie-Philip Poulin
CB-RJ	Rebecca Johnston
CB-SS	Shannon Szabados
CB-SV	Sarah Vaillancourt

== International exhibition games ==
- January 1: Jayna Hefford scored the only goal in the shootout goal (Charline Labonté stopped all three American shooters) as Canada beat the U.S. by a score of 3-2. Before the match, Hefford was honoured for reaching the 200-game plateau in November. The game was played in front of 16,347 fans at Scotiabank Place. It was the largest Canadian crowd to watch a women's hockey game, surpassing the previous mark of 15,163 set Jan. 26, 1998 at the Calgary Saddledome.

Date	Opponent	Location	Time	Score
Aug. 15, 2009	Sweden	Calgary, AB	19:00 pm	7-2
Oct. 5, 2009	USA	Victoria, BC (Save on Foods Centre)	19:00 PM	3-1
Oct. 16, 2009	USA	Spokane, WA (Spokane Arena)	19:00 PM	5-2
Dec. 12, 2009	USA	Denver, CO (Magness Arena)	TBD	4-2
Dec. 15, 2009	USA	Calgary, AB	TBD	6-2
Dec. 30, 2009	USA	St. Paul, MN (Xcel Energy Center)	19:00 PM	2-1
Jan. 1, 2010	USA	Ottawa, ON	19:00 PM	3-2 (Shootout)

== Intrasquad games ==
=== Under-22 series ===
The Canadian national team participated in a three-game series against the Canadian under-22 national team. All games were played at the Father David Bauer Olympic Arena in Calgary, Alberta.

Date	Score	Notes
Aug. 17, 2009	National team, 4-3	Two points by Meghan Agosta
Aug. 18, 2009	National team, 5-2	Two points by Meghan Agosta
Aug. 20, 2009	National team, 10-0	Two goals by Meghan Agosta and Hayley Wickenheiser

=== Red and White Games ===
- The national team competes in intersquad games in Calgary. One team dons red jerseys, while the other team wears white jerseys.

Date	Time	Location	Notes
Sept. 28, 2009	19:00 PM	White 5, Red 2	Hayley Wickenheiser scored four goals and Haley Irwin added one of her own for White in its victory over Red
Oct. 26, 2009			

== Tournaments ==
Jayna Hefford has scored 19 goals in 20 games versus boys' midget AAA teams during this pre-Olympic season.

=== Icebreaker Tournament ===
- All games were held at Father David Bauer Arena in Calgary.

Date	Opponent	Score
Sept. 24, 2009	Calgary Flames Midget AAA	Win, 3-2
Sept. 25, 2009	Calgary Bisons	Win, 6-5
Sept. 26, 2009	Calgary Royals	Win, 3-2
Sept. 27, 2009	Calgary Royals (championship game)	Win, 5-4

=== 2009 Canada Cup ===
- All games were held at General Motors Place in Vancouver, British Columbia.

Date	Opponent	Time	Score
August 31, 2009	Sweden	19:30 PM	Win, 7-0
Sep 1, 2009	Finland	19:30 PM	Win, 10-2
Sep 3, 2009	USA	19:30 PM	Loss, 4-2
Sep 5, 2009	Sweden (semifinal)	19:30 PM	Win, 7-2
Sep 6, 2009	USA (final)	19:30 PM	Loss, 2-1

=== NWT Midget Series ===
Date	Opponent	Location	Time	Score
Oct. 2, 2009	Red Deer Optimist Rebels	Red Deer Arena	20:00 pm	4-2
Oct. 7, 2009	Medicine Hat AAA Tigers	Medicine Hat Arena	19:30 pm	4-2
Oct. 8, 2009	Lethbridge Titans	Henderson Ice Centre	19:30 pm	3-4
Oct. 13, 2009	Calgary Buffaloes	Father David Bauer Olympic Arena	19:30 pm	4-3 (OT)
Oct. 20, 2009	Grande Prairie	Coca-Cola Centre	19:00 pm	5-1
Oct. 21, 2009	Edmonton KC	Clareview Arena	19:45 pm	3-0
Oct. 22, 2009	UFA	Strathmore Family Centre	18:45 pm	0-6
Oct. 27, 2009	Calgary Flames Juniors	Father David Bauer Olympic Arena	19:30 pm	5-2
Nov. 17, 2009	Calgary Royals	Father David Bauer Olympic Arena	19:30 pm	2-4
Nov. 19, 2009	Edmonton SSAC	Confederation Arena	19:30 pm	6-1
Nov. 20, 2009	Leduc	Leduc Recreation Centre	19:30 pm	7-5
Nov. 24, 2009	Calgary Northstars	Father David Bauer Olympic Arena	19:30 pm	4-3 (Shootout)
Nov. 26, 2009	Calgary Buffaloes	Father David Bauer Olympic Arena	19:30 pm	3-4
Dec. 1, 2009	Red Deer	Red Deer Arena	19:15 pm	1-3
Dec. 3, 2009	Calgary Northstars	Father David Bauer Olympic Arena	19:30 pm	7-1
Dec. 5, 2009	Calgary Canucks	Max Bell Centre	19:30 pm	3-2
Jan 13, 2010	Edmonton CAC	Edmonton, AB	19:45 PM	8-4
Jan 19, 2010	Fort Saskatchewan Rangers	Fort Saskatchewan, AB	19:30 PM	3-5

=== Alberta Lottery Series ===
Date	Opponent	Location	Time	Score
Oct. 13, 2009	Calgary Buffaloes	Father David Bauer Arena	19:30 pm	4-3 (OT)
Oct. 20, 2009	Grande Prairie	Coca-Cola Arena	19:00 pm	5-1
Oct. 21, 2009	Edmonton Knights of Columbus	Clearview Arena	19:45 pm	3-0
Oct. 22, 2009	UFA Bisons	Strathmore Arena	18:45 pm	0-6

=== Four Nations Cup ===
- All games to be held in Finland.

Date	Opponent	Location	Time	Score
Nov 3, 2009	Sweden	Vierumaki	18:30 PM	4-0
Nov 4, 2009	Finland	Kerava	18:30 PM	4-2
Nov 4, 2009	USA	Vierumaki	18:30 PM	2-3
Nov 7, 2009	USA (gold-medal game)	Tikkurila	20:00 PM	5-1

== Roster ==
- December 21: Melody Davidson, head coach of Canada's women's Olympic hockey team, made final cuts to her roster, in preparation for the Olympic Games. The players that were cut included Gillian Ferrari, Jennifer Wakefield, Delaney Collins, Brianne Jenner and Jocelyne Larocque.
- Marie-Philip Poulin is the youngest player on the 2010 Olympic team.

Number	Name	Position	Height	Club
1	Shannon Szabados	G	5'8"	Grant MacEwan
2	Meghan Agosta	F	5'7"	Mercyhurst
3	Carla MacLeod	D	5'4"	Calgary Oval X-Treme
4	Becky Kellar	D	5'7"	Burlington Barracudas
5	Colleen Sostorics	D	5'4"	Calgary Oval X-Treme
6	Rebecca Johnston	F	5'7"	Cornell University
7	Cherie Piper	F	5'6"	Calgary Oval X-Treme
10	Gillian Apps	F	6'0"	Brampton Thunder
12	Meaghan Mikkelson	D	5'9"	Edmonton Chimos
13	Caroline Ouellette	F	5'11"	Montreal Stars
16	Jayna Hefford	F	5'5"	Brampton Thunder
17	Jennifer Botterill	F	5'9"	Mississauga Chiefs
18	Catherine Ward	D	5'6"	McGill Martlets
21	Haley Irwin	F	5'7	University of Minnesota-Duluth
22	Hayley Wickenheiser	F	5'10"	Ekilstuna Linden (Sweden)
25	Tessa Bonhomme	D	5'7"	Calgary Oval X-Treme
26	Sarah Vaillancourt	F	5'6"	Harvard University
27	Gina Kingsbury	F	5'8"	Calgary Oval X-Treme
29	Marie-Philip Poulin	F	5'6"	Dawson College
32	Charline Labonté	G	5'9"	McGill Martlets
33	Kim St. Pierre	G	5'9"	Montreal Stars

- The following played for Team Canada prior to December 21.

Number	Name	Position	Height	Club
9	Gillian Ferrari	D	5'8"	Calgary Oval X-Treme
19	Brianne Jenner	F	5'9"	Mississauga Chiefs
20	Jennifer Wakefield	F	5'9"	University of New Hampshire
23	Jocelyne Larocque	D	5'6"	University of Minnesota-Duluth
34	Delaney Collins	D	5'4"	Calgary Oval X-Treme

== Player stats ==
- Stats are as of October 2, 2009.

=== Skaters ===
Player	Goals	Assists	Points	PIM
Meghan Agosta	7	9	16	
Jayna Hefford	4	8	12	
Caroline Ouellette	4	6	10	
Rebecca Johnston	6	3	9	
Haley Irwin	5	2	7	
Marie-Philip Poulin	4	3	7	
Sarah Vaillancourt	2	5	7	
Jennifer Botterill	3	3	6	
Jennifer Wakefield	2	4	6	
Colleen Sostorics	1	5	6	
Hailey Wickenheiser	3	2	5	
Cherie Piper	1	5	6	
Gillian Apps	2	2	4	
Catherine Ward	0	4	4	
Brianne Jenner	2	1	3	
Gillian Ferrari	0	3	3	
Becky Kellar	0	3	3	
Meghan Mikkelson	0	3	3	
Delaney Collins	0	2	2	
Tessa Bonhomme	0	1	1	
Carla McLeod	0	1	1	

=== Goaltenders ===
Szabados has faced 116 shots in five games. St-Pierre has faced 85 shots in four games.

- September 3, 2009, was goalie Shannon Szabados' first loss (2-4 versus US). Up to that point, her record was 9-0.

Player	Games played	Minutes	Goals against	Wins	Losses	Ties	Shutouts	Save %	Goals against average
Shannon Szabados	5	300	10	4	0	0	0		2.00
Kim St. Pierre	4	240	12	4	0	0	1		3.00

== 2010 Olympics ==
In the first three games, Canada took their goal total at the 2010 Games to 41 in three matches.

- February 14: Canada defeated Slovakia by a record-setting score of 18–0 in their opening game of the 2010 Vancouver Olympic Winter Games on Saturday. Jayna Hefford and Meghan Agosta scored three goals each for Canada who set a record for the most lopsided win women's Olympic hockey tournament history. Canada also held the previous record for the biggest blowout, a 16-0 demolition of host Italy at the Torino 2006 Olympic Games. Hefford finished with a game-high six points in front of a crowd of 16,496 at the Canada Hockey Place arena. Slovakia was making their first appearance in the women's tournament as they were promoted to the top level after winning the qualifying event. Slovakia was outshot 67–9.
  - International ice hockey chief René Fasel defended the inclusion of women's hockey in the Olympic Games Sunday by stating one-sided blowouts like Canada's 18-0 thrashing of Slovakia were once a part of the men's game. The IIHF president also said hockey fans are going to have to get used to the disparity between superpowers Canada and the US and the rest of the Olympic field until they can develop more female players in non-traditional hockey-playing countries. The Canadian women said they never thought twice Saturday about not running up the score against Slovakia doesn't help their cause. In fact, some players stated they were giving Slovakia a taste of its own medicine as the Slovaks qualification to the Olympics included an 82-0 thumping of hockey newcomer Bulgaria.
- On February 17, Hayley Wickenheiser became the all-time leading Olympic goal scorer as Canada defeated Sweden 13–1. Wickenheiser reached her record total of 16 career Olympic goals by scoring once on Wednesday as Canada followed up their 18–0 win over Slovakia and 10–1 defeat of Switzerland. In addition, Meghan Agosta scored a record third Olympic hat-trick in the match against Sweden to move on to eight goals in this tournament, equalling Danielle Goyette's record for most goals in one Olympic tournament, set in 1998.

=== Schedule ===
Date	Opponent	Location	Time	Score	Record
Feb. 13	Slovakia	Canada Hockey Place	5:00 PM (PST)	18 - 0	1-0
Feb. 15	Switzerland	UBC Thunderbird Arena	2:30 PM (PST)	10 - 1	2-0
Feb. 17	Sweden	UBC Thunderbird Arena	2:30 PM (PST)	13-1	3-0
Feb. 22	Finland	UBC Thunderbird Arena	17:00 PM	5-0	4-0
Feb. 25	USA	General Motors Place	17:00 PM	2-0	5-0

=== Olympic statistics ===
==== Skaters ====
Player	Goals	Assists	Points	PIM	Shots	+/-
Meghan Agosta	9	6	15	2	25	14
Gillian Apps	3	4	7	2	20	10
Jennifer Botterill	0	2	2	0	7	7
Tessa Bonhomme	2	2	4	0	7	12
Jayna Hefford	5	7	12	8	26	15
Haley Irwin	5	1	6	4	28	8
Rebecca Johnston	1	5	6	2	18	9
Becky Kellar	0	4	4	6	5	14
Gina Kingsbury	2	1	3	6	18	5
Carla Macleod	2	3	5	2	9	13
Meaghan Mikkelson	0	0	0	2	9	11
Caroline Ouellette	2	9	11	2	14	12
Cherie Piper	5	5	10	0	12	12
Marie-Phillip Poulin	5	2	7	2	14	7
Colleen Sostorics	1	5	6	2	7	13
Sarah Vaillancourt	3	5	8	6	14	7
Catherine Ward	1	3	4	4	6	15
Hayley Wickenheiser	2	9	11	0	25	14

==== Goaltenders ====
Player	Games Played	Minutes	Goals Against	Wins	Losses	Shutouts	Save %	Goals Against Average
Charline Labonte	1	20	1	0	0	1	88.9	1.00
Kim St. Pierre	2	100	0	2	0	2	100.0	0.00
Shannon Szabados	3	180	1	3	0	1	98.0	0.33

== Under-22 team ==
- The head coach of the under-22 team was Margot Page. She was assisted by Jim Fetter of Wayne State University and Stephanie White of Ryerson University.
- January 10: Vicki Bendus scored a goal and added two assists for the Canadian national women's under-22 team in the gold medal game of the 2010 MLP Cup. Canada defeated Switzerland, 9-0 in Ravensburg, Germany. The Canadian team won all four of their games by a combined score of 24-4, and secured their seventh goal medal in the past eight years. In three games, Bendus, Jesse Scanzano and Bailey Bram (from the Mercyhurst Lakers women's ice hockey team) combined for seven goals and 18 points. Benuds and Bram were tied for the tournament lead in scoring, and Bendus was named the tournament's top forward.

=== MLP Cup ===
Date	Opponent	Score	Record	Notes
Monday January 4	Germany	5-1	1-0	Emmanuelle Blais and Carolyne Prevost had two assists
Tuesday January 5	Switzerland	4-1	2-0	Natalie Spooner and Mallory Deluce finished with a goal and an assist each
Thursday January 7	Germany	7-0	3-0	Brianne Jenner and Bailey Bram finished with a goal and two assists each
Friday January 8	Sweden	4-3 (OT)	4-0	Natalie Spooner scored the game winning goal
Saturday January 9	Switzerland	9-0	5-0	Canada won gold at the MLP Cup for the seventh time in eight years

== Under-18 team ==
- March 1: Hockey Canada announced its roster for the team competing at the third ever IIHF Under 18 Women's World Championships. The head coach is Dan Church and he is assisted by Pierre Alain and Lisa Jordan. The roster includes six players who took part in the 2009 IIHF World Women's Under-18 Championship:
- Jessica Campbell
- Christine Bestland
- Mélodie Daoust
- Laurie Kingsbury
- Jamie Lee Rattray
- Brigette Lacquette
- Jillian Saulnier

=== Standings ===
Team	GP	W	OTW	OTL	L	GF	GA	PTS
Canada	3	3	0	0	0	29	3	9
Sweden	3	2	0	0	1	9	13	6
Germany	3	1	0	0	2	7	21	3
Russia	3	0	0	0	3	5	13	0

=== Schedule ===
Date	Opponent	Score	Record	Notes
March 27	Russia	6-3	1-0	Brigette Lacquette scored a goal and added two assists
March 28	Germany	15-0	2-0	Jessica Campbell had two goals and four assists while 10 players had at least two points
March 30	Sweden	8-0	3-0	Eight different players scored at least one goal
April 2	Germany (semifinal)	10-0	4-0	Jessica Campbell and Jillian Saulnier each scored two goals and an assist
April 3	United States (final)	5-4 (OT)	5-0	Jessica Campbell scores overtime winner

== Awards and honours ==
- Olympic Team
  - Media All-Star Team
  - G – Shannon Szabados
  - F – Meghan Agosta
  - F – Marie-Philip Poulin
  - Olympic MVP – Meghan Agosta (CAN)
- Directorate Awards
  - Best Goalkeeper: Shannon Szabados
  - Best Forward: Meghan Agosta
- Under-22 team
  - Vicki Bendus, Top Forward, 2010 MLP Cup
- Under-18 team
  - Jessica Campbell, Tournament MVP
  - Brigette Lacquette was named Best Defenceman by the Directorate

== See also ==
- 2010–11 Canada women's national ice hockey team
- Canada women's national ice hockey team
