= Mariia Posa =

Finnish ice hockey player (born 1988)

- Born: 21 February 1988 (age 38) Helsinki, Finland
- Height: 5 ft 5 in (165 cm)
- Weight: 127 lb (58 kg; 9 st 1 lb)
- Position: Defence
- Shot: Left
- Played for: Porvoo-Borgå Hunters; IHK Helsinki; Espoo Blues; Minnesota Duluth Bulldogs
- National team: Finland
- Playing career: 2002–2015
Medal record
Women's ice hockey
Representing Finland
Olympic Games
Bronze medal – third place	2010 Vancouver	Team
Four Nations Cup
Bronze medal – third place	2010 Canada

Mariia Posa (born 21 February 1988, in Helsinki) is a Finnish retired ice hockey defenceman. She played for several years as a member of the Finnish national team and also played for the University of Minnesota Duluth.

== Playing career ==
=== Minnesota Duluth ===
In her freshman year with the University of Minnesota Duluth, Posa helped the Bulldogs qualify for the 2010 NCAA National Collegiate Women's Ice Hockey Tournament and win the NCAA championship.

She was named to the 2010–11 All-WCHA Academic Team and 2011–12 All-WCHA Academic Team.

=== Professional ===
After graduating, Posa joined the Espoon Blues. She helped lead the Blues to the back-to-back Finnish Ice Hockey Championships in 2013 and 2014.

=== Finland ===
- Posa appeared for Team Finland in the 2009 Four Nation's Cup and she won a bronze medal at the 2010 Four Nations Cup in St. John's, Newfoundland.

== Career statistics ==
=== Finland ===
Event	Games Played	Goals	Assists	Points	Shots	PIM	+/-
2010 Winter Olympics	3	0	0	0	0	1	−1

=== Minnesota Duluth ===
Year	Games Played	Goals	Assists	Points	Penalty Minutes
2009–10	24	2	4	6	4

== Awards and honors ==
- WCHA Rookie of the Week (Week of November 18, 2009)
