= 2010 CWHL Draft =

General information
- Date: August 12, 2010
- Location: Toronto, Ontario

Overview
- First selection: Tessa Bonhomme

On August 12, the Canadian Women's Hockey League hosted the 2010 CWHL Draft. The event was held at the Hockey Hall of Fame in Toronto at 7:00pm. The first overall selection was former Ohio State hockey player and Olympic gold medallist Tessa Bonhomme. Former Olympic gold medallist Cheryl Pounder was Master of Ceremonies at the draft.

== Rules ==
All five teams were allowed to protect five players who had played at least one year in the league. Only players from the Greater Toronto Area were available in the draft for teams from Toronto, Burlington and Brampton. Boston and Montreal did not draft players. These clubs will sign prospective players from their geographic areas.

== Draft by team ==
= Indicates Olympian

= Indicates former NCAA player

= Indicates former CIS player

=== Brampton ===
#	Player	Hometown	College
5	Delaney Collins (D)	(Canada) Pilot Mound, Manitoba	Alberta Pandas (CWUAA)
8	Ashley Pendleton (D)	(Canada) Orton, Ontario	Mercyhurst Lakers (CHA)
11	Andrea Ironside (F)	(Canada) Collingwood, Ontario	Laurier Golden Hawks (OUA)
14	Amber Bowman (D)	(Canada) Innisfil, Ontario	Ohio State Buckeyes (WCHA)
17	Brooke Beazer (F)	(Canada) Kingston, Ontario	Clarkson Golden Knights (ECAC Hockey)
20	Erika Vanderveer (G)	(Canada) Bradford, Ontario	Ohio State Buckeyes (WCHA)
23	Ashley Stephenson (D)	(Canada) Mississauga, Ontario	Laurier Golden Hawks (OUA)
26	Jennifer Kirk (F)	(Canada) Brampton, Ontario	Sheridan Bruins (OCAA)
29	Courtney Unruh (F)	(Canada) Cecil Lake, British Columbia	Mercyhurst Lakers (CHA)
32	RaeLyn LaRocque (F)	(Canada) The Pas, Manitoba	Ohio State Buckeyes (WCHA)
35	Lindsay Brown (F)	(Canada) Hamilton, Ontario	St. Francis Xavier X-Women (AUS)
38	Allyson Fox (D)	(Canada) Toronto, Ontario	York Lions (OUA)
89	Yekaterina Smolentseva (F)	Dmitrov, Russia	Ural State Pedagogical University

==== Protected players ====
Player	Hometown	College
Lori Dupuis (F)	(Canada) Cornwall, Ontario	Toronto Lady Blues (OUA)
Jayna Hefford (F)	(Canada) Kingston, Ontario	Toronto Lady Blues (OUA)
Laura Hosier (G)	(Canada) Sharon, Ontario	Mercyhurst Lakers (CHA)
Cherie Piper (F)	(Canada) Toronto, Ontario	Dartmouth Big Green (ECAC Hockey)
Gillian Apps (D)	(Canada) Unionville, Ontario	Dartmouth Big Green (ECAC Hockey)

=== Burlington ===
#	Player	Hometown	2009-10 Team
2	Ashley Riggs (F)	(Canada) Pickering, Ontario	Niagara Purple Eagles (CHA)
6	Christina Kessler (G)	(Canada) Mississauga, Ontario	Harvard Crimson (ECAC Hockey)
7	Shannon Moulson (D)	(Canada) Mississauga, Ontario	Niagara Purple Eagles (CHA)
12	Natalie Payne (D)	(Canada) Mississauga, Ontario	Mercyhurst Lakers (CHA)
13	Danijela Rundqvist (F)	Stockholm, Sweden	Sweden women's national ice hockey team
18	Amanda Shaw (D)	(Canada) Whitby, Ontario	Boston University Terriers (HEA)
19	Kelly Hart (F)	(Canada) Burlington, Ontario	Bemidji State Beavers (WCHA)
24	Brianne McLaughlin (G)	(United States) Sheffield, Ohio	Robert Morris Lady Colonials (CHA)
25	Mallory Johnston (D)	(Canada) Chatham, Ontario	Colgate Raiders (ECAC Hockey)
30	Christine Hartnoll (F)	(Canada) Markham, Ontario	UNB Varsity Reds (AUS)
31	Danielle Blanchard (F)	(Canada) Newmarket, Ontario	Plattsburgh Cardinals (ECAC West)
36	Samantha Shirley (F)	(Canada) Mississauga, Ontario	Mercyhurst Lakers (CHA)
37	Michele Janus	Västerhaninge, Sweden	Ryerson Rams (OUA)
40	Andrea Bevan (D)	(Canada) Collingwood, Ontario	Laurier Golden Hawks (OUA)
45	Jaclyn Pitushka (D)	(Canada) Mississauga, Ontario	Harvard Crimson (HEA)
46	Kelly Stewart (D)	(Canada) Toronto, Ontario	St. Cloud State Huskies (WCHA)
51	Amanda Parkins (F)	(Canada) Kingston, Ontario	Burlington Barracudas (reacquired in draft)
52	Ashley Stewart (F)	(Canada) Toronto, Ontario	St. Cloud State Huskies (WCHA)

==== Protected players ====
Player	Hometown	College
Jana Harrigan (F)	(Canada) Burlington, Ontario	Ohio State Buckeyes (WCHA)
Becky Kellar (D)	(Canada) Burlington, Ontario	Brown Bears (ECAC Hockey)
Lindsay Vine (F)	(Canada) Oakville, Ontario	Niagara Purple Eagles (CHA)
Sommer West (F)	(Canada) Clarington, Ontario	Durham Lords (OCAA)

=== Toronto ===
#	Player	Hometown	College
1	Tessa Bonhomme (D)	(Canada) Sudbury, Ontario	Ohio State Buckeyes (WCHA)
3	Britni Smith (D)	(Canada) Port Perry, Ontario	St. Lawrence Skating Saints (ECAC Hockey)
4	Carly Haggard (F)	(Canada) Port Alberni, British Columbia	Dartmouth Big Green (ECAC Hockey)
9	Kendra Fisher (G)	(Canada) Kincardine, Ontario	Humber Hawks (OCAA)
10	Michelle Bonello (D)	(Canada) Mississauga, Ontario	Mercyhurst Lakers (CHA)
15	Jennifer Brine (F)	(Canada) Truro, Nova Scotia	Harvard Crimson (ECAC Hockey)
16	LaToya Clarke (F)	(Canada) Pickering, Ontario	Minnesota Golden Golphers (WCHA)
21	Rebecca Davies (F)	(Canada) Toronto, Ontario	St. Francis Xavier X-Women (AUS)
22	Frances McPhail (F)	(Canada) Vancouver, British Columbia	Niagara Purple Eagles (CHA)
27	Meagan Aarts (F)	(Canada) Watford, Ontario	Maine Black Bears (HEA)
28	Alexandra Hoffmeyer (D)	(United States) Detroit, Michigan	Mercyhurst Lakers (CHA)
33	Kelly Zamora (F)	(Canada) Oshawa, Ontario	Wayne State Warriors (CHA)
34	Angela Di Stasi (F)	(Canada) Toronto, Ontario	Concordia Stingers (QSSF)
39	Mary Modeste (D)	(Canada) Oshawa, Ontario	Toronto Lady Blues (OUA)
42	Laura Watt (D)	(Canada) Ajax, Ontario	Princeton Tigers (ECAC Hockey)
43	Jessica Clermont (D)	(Canada) Port Elgin, Ontario	Niagara Purple Eagles (CHA)
48	Kristy Zamora (F)	(Canada) Oshawa, Ontario	Brown Bears (ECAC Hockey)
49	Emily Berzins (F)	(Canada) Fort McMurray, Alberta	Wayne State Warriors (CHA)
54	Melissa Boal (F)	(Canada) Pakenham, Ontario	Wayne State Warriors (CHA)

==== Protected players ====
Player	Hometown	College
Jennifer Botterill (F)	(Canada) Winnipeg, Manitoba	Harvard Crimson (ECAC Hockey)
Martine Garland (D)	(Canada) Toronto, Ontario	New Hampshire Wildcats (ECAC East)
Sami Jo Small (G)	(Canada) Winnipeg, Manitoba	Stanford University

== Montreal ==
=== Protected players ===
Player	Hometown	College
Annie Guay (D)	(Canada) Rouyn-Noranda, Quebec	St. Lawrence Skating Saints (ECAC Hockey)
Sabrina Harbec (F)	(Canada) Saint-Hubert, Quebec	St. Lawrence Skating Saints (ECAC Hockey)
Caroline Ouellette (F)	(Canada) Montreal, Quebec	Minnesota Duluth Bulldogs (WCHA)
Kim St. Pierre (G)	(Canada) Châteauguay, Quebec	McGill Martlets (QSSF)
Julie Chu (F)	(United States) Fairfield, Connecticut	Harvard Crimson (ECAC Hockey)

== Boston ==
The Boston club was able to protect some players from being selected from their roster in the draft.

=== Protected players ===
Player	Hometown	College
Caitlin Cahow (D)	(United States) New Haven, Connecticut	Harvard Crimson (ECAC Hockey)
Molly Engstrom (D)	(United States) Siren, Wisconsin	Wisconsin Badgers (WCHA)
Melissa Haber (G)	(Canada) Toronto, Ontario	Boston University Terriers (HEA)
Cherie Hendrickson (D)	(United States) Boxford, Massachusetts	Providence Friars (HEA)
Kacey Bellamy (D)	(United States) Westfield, Massachusetts	New Hampshire Wildcats (ECAC East)
