= 2009–10 Sacred Heart Pioneers women's ice hockey season =

ECAC Open, Third place
- Conference: Independent
- Home ice: Gutterson Fieldhouse

Rankings
- USA Today/USA Hockey Magazine: Not ranked
- USCHO.com/CBS College Sports: Not ranked

Record

Coaches and captains
- Head coach: Tom O’Malley
- Assistant coaches: J.G. Capozzoli

The 2009-10 Sacred Heart Pioneers season was their seventh season as a Division I Independent. Led by head coach Tom O’Malley, the Pioneers had 10 victories, compared to 19 defeats and 3 ties.

== Regular season ==
=== Season highlights ===
- September 25: Raelene Sydor had a season-high 40 saves in the Pioneers’ season opener at Maine.
- September 26: Against the Maine Black Bears women's ice hockey program, Nicole Palazzo scored once and added two assists.
- October 3: Kate Dunlop scored a power play goal at Quinnipiac.
- November 27: Emily Siira made a season-high 42 saves against the Yale Bulldogs women's ice hockey program.
- December 4: Kate Dunlop registered three assists and a goal in 6-1 win over Oswego State
- December 5: Brittany Hartman scored twice, once on the power play, and added an assist in 7-2 win over Oswego State
- January 9: Brittany Hartman had three assists and scored two goals in a 9-7 win at Bowdoin. Kate Dunlop had two goals and two assists in the same game.
- January 16: Against Neumann, Nicole Palazzo had three assists.
- January 22–23: Brittany Hartman and Kate Dunlop each registered a goal and an assist in each game against the Robert Morris Colonials women’s ice hockey program.
- February 6: Brittany Hartman scored the game-winning goal at Wesleyan
- February 12: In a 5-0 win over Salve Regina, Nicole Palazzo had three assists.

=== Schedule ===
| Date | Score | Opponent | Time | Record |
| 09/25/2009 | 0-9 | @ Maine | 7:00 ET | 0-1-0 |
| 09/26/2009 | 4-11 | @ Maine | 2:00 ET | 0-2-0 |
| 10/03/2009 | 1-4 | @ Quinnipiac | 2:00 ET | 0-3-0 |
| 10/16/2009 | 0-6 | @ Union | 7:00 ET | 0-4-0 |
| 10/17/2009 | 1-3 | @ Union | 4:00 ET | 0-5-0 |
| 10/24/2009 | 6-2 | @ Rhode Island | 7:00 ET | 1-5-0 |
| 11/13/2009 | 5-2 | @ Potsdam | 7:00 ET | 2-5-0 |
| 11/14/2009 | 3-6 | @ Potsdam | 2:00 ET | 2-6-0 |
| 11/18/2009 | 3-5 | Holy Cross | 7:00 ET | 2-7-0 |
| 11/27/2009 | 1-10 | @ Yale | 4:00 ET (1) | 2-8-0 |
| 11/28/2009 | 1-11 | vs Quinnipiac | 4:00 ET | 2-9-0 |
| 12/02/2009 | 3-1 | Nichols | 7:00 ET | 3-9-0 |
| 12/04/2009 | 6-1 | Oswego | 7:00 ET | 4-9-0 |
| 12/05/2009 | 7-1 | Oswego | 2:00 ET | 5-9-0 |
| 12/11/2009 | 4-4 | Robert Morris Coll | 7:00 ET | 5-9-1 |
| 12/29/2009 | 3-5 | Western Ontario | 7:00 ET | 5-10-1 |
| 12/30/2009 | 3-1 | Western Ontario | 2:00 ET | 6-10-1 |
| 01/05/2010 | 5-7 | Lake Forest | 1:00 ET | 6-11-1 |
| 01/07/2010 | 4-4 | @ Southern Maine | 4:00 ET | 6-11-2 |
| 01/09/2010 | 9-7 | @ Bowdoin | 7:30 ET | 7-11-2 |
| 01/10/2010 | 2-5 | @ Bowdoin | 2:00 ET | 7-12-2 |
| 01/15/2010 | 3-5 | @ Neumann | 7:00 ET | 7-13-2 |
| 01/16/2010 | 4-10 | @ Neumann | 7:00 ET | 7-14-2 |
| 01/22/2010 | 2-10 | @ Robert Morris | 7:05 ET | 7-15-2 |
| 01/23/2010 | 4-13 | @ Robert Morris | 7:05 ET | 7-16-2 |
| 02/02/2010 | 1-5 | Williams | 7:00 ET | 7-17-2 |
| 02/06/2010 | 4-2 | @ Wesleyan | 3:00 ET | 8-17-2 |
| 02/12/2010 | 5-0 | Salve Regina | 7:00 ET | 9-17-2 |
| 02/19/2010 | 5-9 | Rhode Island | 7:00 ET | 9-18-2 |
| 02/20/2010 | 7-1 | Rhode Island | 2:00 ET | 10-18-2 |
| 02/27/2010 | 6-7 (ot) | vs St. Anselm | 4:00 ET | 10-19-2 |
| 02/28/2010 | 3-3 | vs St. Michael's | 1:00 ET | 10-19-3 |

== Players ==
- Brittany Hartman skated in all 26 games for the Pioneers. She got her first goal of the season at Maine on September 26. She posted nine multi-point games. Hartman was second on the team in points with 30 (14 goals and 16 assists). Her four power play goals led the team.
- As a sophomore, Nicole Palazzo appeared in 24 games. She had five goals and tied for the team lead in assists with 17. In each ECAC Open Tournament game, Nicole Palazzo scored a power play goal.
- Kate Dunlop appeared in all 26 games and was the Pioneers' Captain. Dunlop finished third on the team in scoring with 26 total points (9 goals, 17 assists).
- Goaltender Raelene Sydor was in her sophomore year. She posted a 5.79 goals against average and accumulated 309 saves.
- Freshman Emily Siira started in 14 games in the net and appeared in 17 overall. For the season, she stopped 453 shots. Statistically, she registered a 5.32 goals against average and .850 save percentage. As a rookie, Siira managed to win five games. In six games, Siira recorded at least 30 saves.

== Player stats ==
=== Skaters ===
| Name | Games Played | Goals | Assists | Points | PPG | PIM | GW | PP | SH |
| Lauren Fontaine | 26 | 22 | 14 | 36 | 1.3846 | 28 | 0 | 1 | 2 |
| Brittany Hartman | 26 | 14 | 16 | 30 | 1.1538 | 8 | 1 | 3 | 0 |
| Kate Dunlop | 26 | 9 | 17 | 26 | 1.0000 | 12 | 1 | 3 | 0 |
| Nicole Palazzo | 24 | 5 | 17 | 22 | 0.9167 | 24 | 0 | 3 | 0 |
| Kristina Hankins | 25 | 6 | 9 | 15 | 0.6000 | 2 | 1 | 1 | 1 |
| Taryn Lapierre | 25 | 5 | 10 | 15 | 0.6000 | 14 | 2 | 1 | 0 |
| Caitlin Gottwald | 26 | 6 | 5 | 11 | 0.4231 | 22 | 1 | 2 | 1 |
| Jamie Mey | 23 | 3 | 8 | 11 | 0.4783 | 4 | 0 | 0 | 0 |
| Tara Kent | 26 | 5 | 5 | 10 | 0.3846 | 12 | 1 | 0 | 0 |
| Jennifer Burroughs | 26 | 2 | 8 | 10 | 0.3846 | 26 | 0 | 0 | 0 |
| Lauren Towers | 26 | 5 | 3 | 8 | 0.3077 | 2 | 0 | 1 | 0 |
| Sarah Delaney | 26 | 1 | 4 | 5 | 0.1923 | 32 | 0 | 0 | 0 |
| Megan Murphy | 24 | 1 | 3 | 4 | 0.1667 | 8 | 0 | 0 | 0 |
| Jackie Galvin | 20 | 1 | 2 | 3 | 0.1500 | 8 | 0 | 0 | 0 |
| Sara Reddington | 11 | 2 | 0 | 2 | 0.1818 | 4 | 0 | 0 | 0 |
| Caroline Herlihy | 20 | 0 | 2 | 2 | 0.1000 | 0 | 0 | 0 | 0 |
| Jennifer Abramo | 5 | 0 | 1 | 1 | 0.2000 | 0 | 0 | 0 | 0 |
| Maura Leahy | 11 | 0 | 1 | 1 | 0.0909 | 18 | 0 | 0 | 0 |
| Erin Burke | 22 | 0 | 0 | 0 | 0.0000 | 0 | 0 | 0 | 0 |
| Raelene Sydor | 15 | 0 | 0 | 0 | 0.0000 | 0 | 0 | 0 | 0 |
| Tatiana Klinoff | 12 | 0 | 0 | 0 | 0.0000 | 2 | 0 | 0 | 0 |
| Lavinia Kronberg | 3 | 0 | 0 | 0 | 0.0000 | 0 | 0 | 0 | 0 |
| Emily Siira | 17 | 0 | 0 | 0 | 0.0000 | 0 | 0 | 0 | 0 |
| Bailey Millerd | 8 | 0 | 0 | 0 | 0.0000 | 4 | 0 | 0 | 0 |
| Jessica Rice | 9 | 0 | 0 | 0 | 0.0000 | 0 | 0 | 0 | 0 |
| Jennifer Hasson | 12 | 0 | 0 | 0 | 0.0000 | 0 | 0 | 0 | 0 |

== Postseason ==
- Feb 28, 2010: Though the game was officially a 3-3 tie, the Pioneers won the game in a shootout over St. Michael's College in the ECAC Open Championship third place game. Brittany Hartman scored the first goal of the game 2:43 into the first period. Nicole Palazzo had a goal on the power play 6:39 into the second period to tie the game at two. The Pioneers would take the lead less than six minutes later. Hartman scored her 14th score of the season. Purple Knights senior captain Alexis Reagan tied the game at three. The third period did not have any scoring. In the shootout, Kate Dunlop scored the first goal. After St. Michael’s tied it, Brittany Hartman scored again. The Purple Knights would tie the score again. In the seventh round of the shootout, Dunlop scored as the Pioneers took third place.

Pioneers goalie Raelene Sydor recorded 19 saves for the Pioneers. Sacred Heart outshot Saint Michael's 44-22 for the game. The Pioneers converted only once in ten power play opportunities.
