= Tessa Bonhomme =

Canadian ice hockey player (born 1985)

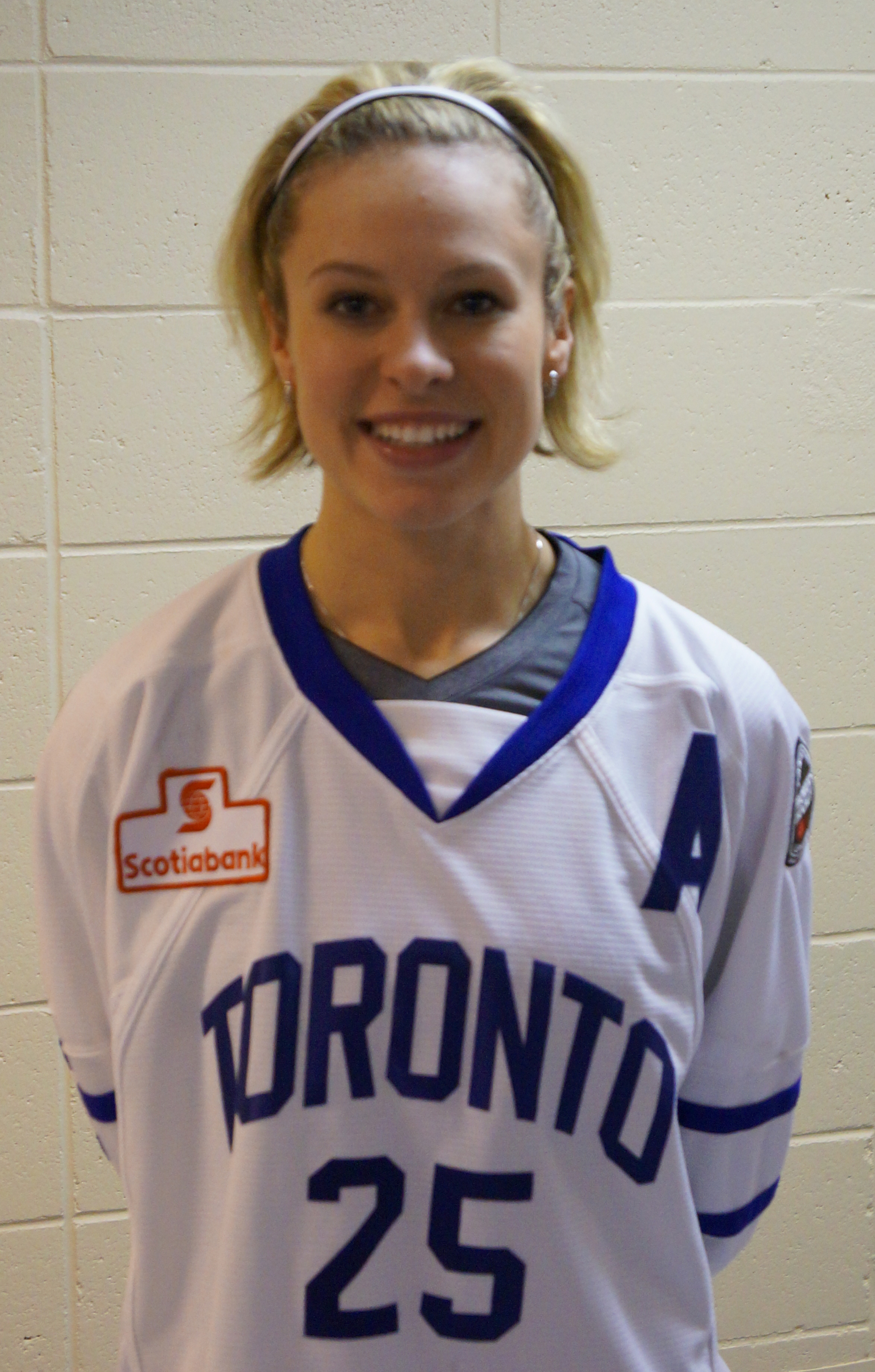
- Born: July 23, 1985 (age 41) Sudbury, Ontario, Canada
- Height: 5 ft 7 in (170 cm)
- Weight: 140 lb (64 kg; 10 st 0 lb)
- Position: Defence
- Shot: Left
- Played for: Ohio State; Mississauga Chiefs; Toronto Furies
- National team: Canada
- Playing career: 2004–2014
Medal record
Representing Canada
Women's ice hockey
Olympic Games
Gold medal – first place	2010 Vancouver	Tournament
World Championships
Gold medal – first place	2007 Canada	Tournament
Gold medal – first place	2012 United States	Tournament
Silver medal – second place	2009 Finland	Tournament
Silver medal – second place	2011 Switzerland	Tournament
Silver medal – second place	2013 Canada	Tournament
Canada Cup
Silver medal – second place	2009 Canada	Tournament
Women's 4 Nations Cup
Gold medal – first place	2004 United States	Tournament
Gold medal – first place	2005 Finland	Tournament
Gold medal – first place	2006 Canada	Tournament
Gold medal – first place	2009 Finland	Tournament
Gold medal – first place	2010 Canada	Tournament
Silver medal – second place	2008 United States	Tournament
Silver medal – second place	2012 Finland	Tournament
Air Canada Cup
Gold medal – first place	2005 Germany	Tournament
Gold medal – first place	2006 Germany	Tournament
Gold medal – first place	2007 Germany	Tournament

Tessa Bonhomme (born July 23, 1985) is a Canadian former professional ice hockey player and is a television sports reporter for The Sports Network (TSN). She was an Olympic gold medallist as a member of the Canadian national women's hockey team and played for the Toronto Furies in the Canadian Women's Hockey League. She was also co-captain of the Ohio State Buckeyes women's ice hockey team in the NCAA.

== Playing career ==
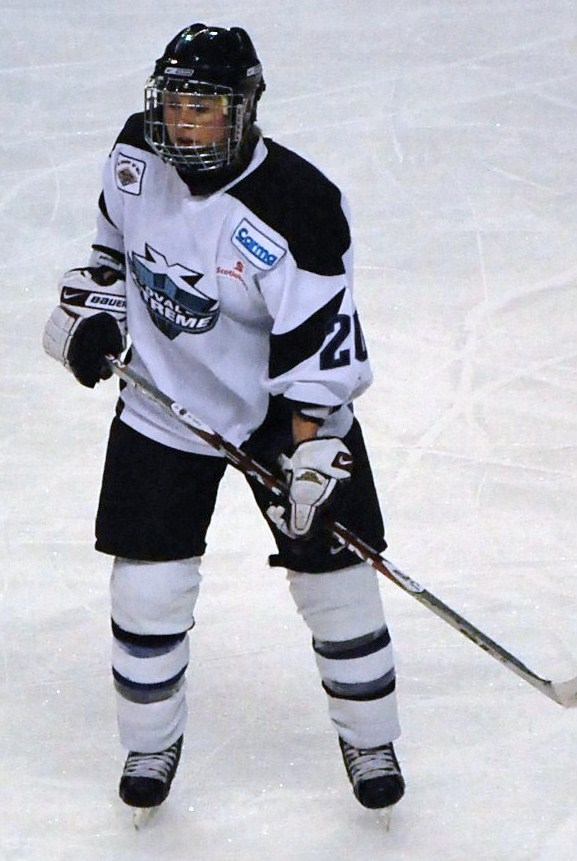
Bonhomme with the Calgary Oval X-Treme in 2009

Bonhomme was a member of the Sudbury Lady Wolves from 1998 to 2003 and served as a captain in 2003. During that same time she competed for the Lasalle Secondary School hockey team from 1999 to 2003 and was the captain in 2003. She was the leading scorer at Lasalle and the league leader for three consecutive years (2001–2003). In 2001, she led Lasalle to a second-place finish in its league and a city championship title in 2001.

=== Ohio State Buckeyes ===
The 2003–04 season marked Bonhomme's freshman year with the Buckeyes. She played in 34 of 35 games and her 20 points (5 goals, 15 assists) led the Buckeye freshman class and tied for third on the squad. In WCHA conference games, Bonhomme tied for fifth among freshmen and seventh among defencemen with 13 points. Her 107 shots paced the freshman class and was third on the team while her four power play goals tied for first on the team.

On October 17, 2003, she registered her first career assist versus Minnesota. Versus Wisconsin (on November 1), Bonhomme scored her first career goal. Said goal was also the game-winning goal. From October 25 to November 15, she had a five-game point streak. November 22 marked the first multi point game of her career. She had two assists versus Bemidji State.

Heading into her sophomore season (2004–05), Bonhomme appeared in 30 of 37 games. Her 27 points ranked third on the team while her 20 assists were second. Of her seven goals, three were scored on the power play. For the season, she was the only Buckeye to finish with positive rating at plus-3. On December 11, 2004, Bonhomme scored two goals against North Dakota in a 3–1 win. In a 5–4 win against the Yale Bulldogs (on January 14), Bonhomme registered three assists. During the season, she had a five-game point streak that began on January 21 and ended on February 4. In a WCHA tournament game (March 4), she had two assists vs. Minnesota State. Of note, she was the first Buckeye to compete for the Canadian women's national ice hockey team when she was one of 20 Canadian players selected to participate in the 4 Nations Cup from November 10–14.

Bonhomme returned to the Buckeyes in 2006 after redshirting the 2005–06 season while taking part in the Canadian Centralization Program in association with the women's national team. Through two seasons, the two-time letterwinner already ranked fourth all-time in defencemen scoring with 47 points. She was co-captain of the team along with Amber Bowman, Katie Maroney and Lacey Schultz.

In her first series back with Ohio State (October 6–7, 2006), Bonhomme had two goals and five assists in a series sweep of Northeastern. In the October 6 contest, Bonhomme scored a career-high four points (two goals and two assists). She attained a career high in points with 36 (14 goals and 22 assists). On the power play, she contributed 17 points (6 goals, 11 assists). Her four game-winning goals led the Buckeyes. Her 1.09 points per game ranked fourth in the NCAA among defenders. During the season, Bonhomme had nine multi-point, three multi-goal and three multi-assist games. Her 137 shots on goal led all Buckeyes players. In WCHA conference play, Bonhomme tallied 23 points 24 conference games. Against WCHA opponents, she scored five power play goals and three game-winning goals. On January 19, she had a career high nine shots on goal against St. Cloud State. From December 30 to January 26, Bonhomme had a seven-game point streak. The February 16–17 series against Minnesota State was the only series where she was held without a point.

=== Hockey Canada ===
Bonhomme participated at Canada's National Under-22 Team Development and Selection Camp from August 15 to 21, 2004 in Waterloo, Ontario. From August 25 to 28, 2004, she took part in a three-game series with Canada's Under 22 team vs. the US National Under-22 Team in Lake Placid, New York, and Burlington, Vermont. In 2005–06, Bonhomme redshirted her season with Ohio State to take part in the Canadian Centralization Program in preparation for the 2006 Winter Olympics in Turin, Italy. Bonhomme was one of 27 players selected to centralize but was one of two players to miss the final cut for the Canadian Olympic roster. In addition, she was a member of the 2005–06 Canadian Under-22 team. She captained the squad to a 3–1 record in an international round-robin tournament in Germany. She attended the Canadian National Women's Team Conditioning Camp from June 10 to 18, 2006. In autumn 2006, Bonhomme was named to the Canada's National Women's Under-22 Team for the third time in her career. From August 24 to 27, 2007, she participated with the U-22 team in an exhibition series vs. the US National Under-22 team. Bonhomme also participated in the Canadian National Women's Team Fall Festival, from August 31 to September 9, 2007, in Prince George, British Columbia. In the first game of the 2011 IIHF Eight Nations Tournament, Bonhomme scored two goals in a 16–0 victory over Switzerland.

==== 2010 Olympic Games ====
Bonhomme scored Canada's second goal in their first game of the tournament, 3 minutes and 6 seconds into the first period and was awarded an Olympic gold medal in women's hockey at the 2010 games in Vancouver.

=== CWHL ===
In the 2010 CWHL Draft, Bonhomme was the first overall selection. She appeared with the Toronto Furies in the championship game of the 2011 Clarkson Cup, and would help the club win the 2014 Clarkson Cup. With the Cup victory, she became the twelfth woman in hockey history to win IIHF World Gold, Olympic Gold and the Clarkson Cup.

=== Career stats ===
Career statistics are from the Team Canada Media Guide for 2012–13. or USCHO.com, or Eliteprospects.com.

==== Regular season and playoffs ====
			Regular season					Playoffs
Season	Team	League	GP	G	A	Pts	PIM	GP	G	A	Pts	PIM
2003–04	OSU	WCHA	31	3	14	17	30	3	2	1	3	4
2004–05	OSU	WCHA	27	7	18	25	58	3	0	2	2	0
2006–07	OSU	WCHA	30	14	20	34	64	3	0	2	2	4
2007–08	OSU	WCHA	32	14	27	41	42	3	2	2	4	2
2008–09	Calgary Oval X-Treme	WWHL	21	12	21	33	18	2	1	2	3	2
2010–11	Toronto CWHL	CWHL	26	8	8	16	26	4	2	2	4	4
2011–12	Toronto Furies	CWHL	24	4	12	16	16	3	0	1	1	0
2012–13	Toronto Furies	CWHL	24	4	5	9	22	3	0	1	1	0
2013–14	Toronto Furies	CWHL	11	1	3	4	10	4	0	3	3	4
2014–15	Toronto Furies	CWHL	12	2	2	4	12	2	1	1	2	2
CWHL totals			97	19	30	49	86	16	3	10	13	14

==== International ====
Year	Team	Event	Result	GP	G	A	Pts	PIM
2004	Canada	4 Nations Cup	1st place, gold medalist(s)	4	0	0	0	16
2005	Canada U22	ACC	1st place, gold medalist(s)	4	0	4	4	2
2005	Canada	4 Nations Cup	1st place, gold medalist(s)	4	0	0	0	0
2005	Canada	Torino Ice	1st place, gold medalist(s)	3	0	1	1	6
2006	Canada U22	ACC	1st place, gold medalist(s)	4	0	1	1	0
2006	Canada	4 Nations Cup	1st place, gold medalist(s)	3	0	1	1	2
2007	Canada U22	ACC	1st place, gold medalist(s)	3	1	2	3	2
2007	Canada	WC	1st place, gold medalist(s)	5	1	1	2	6
2008	Canada	4 Nations Cup	2nd place, silver medalist(s)	3	0	2	2	2
2009	Canada	WC	2nd place, silver medalist(s)	5	0	3	3	0
2009	Canada	HC Cup	2nd place, silver medalist(s)	4	0	2	2	0
2009	Canada	4 Nations Cup	1st place, gold medalist(s)	3	1	1	2	0
2010	Canada	OG	1st place, gold medalist(s)	5	2	2	4	0
2010	Canada	4 Nations Cup	1st place, gold medalist(s)	4	0	3	3	2
2011	Canada	WC	2nd place, silver medalist(s)	5	1	3	4	0
2011	Canada	12 Nations	3rd place, bronze medalist(s)	6	2	6	8	2
2012	Canada	WC	1st place, gold medalist(s)	5	0	1	1	2
2012	Canada	4 Nations Cup	2nd place, silver medalist(s)	4	1	2	3	0
2013	Canada	WC	1st place, gold medalist(s)	5	0	3	3	2
U22 totals				12	1	7	8	4
Senior totals				68	8	31	39	40

=== Awards and honours ===
- 2007 European Air Canada Cup, Tournament All-Star team
- 2010 Olympic Gold Medallist
- Bonhomme was selected by The Hockey News on its annual list of the 100 People of Power and Influence in Ice Hockey. For the 2012 list, Bonhomme ranked at number 89.
- Sportsnet Magazine, 30 Most Beautiful Athletes on the Planet (2012)

==== Ohio State ====
- Ohio State Most Valuable Freshman (2004)
- Top 10 Finalist for 2007 Patty Kazmaier Award (first two-time finalist for the award)
- 2008 WCHA Player of the Year and Defensive Player of the Year, the first Buckeye to receive either award
- Named 2008 First Team All-WCHA to follow her 2007 first team selection. She is the first Ohio State player to be a two-time first team honoree
- Has led the NCAA in defencemen points per game throughout the 2007–08 season
- The only defenceman to rank in the Top 30 in the NCAA in overall points per game and has a 12-point margin over the rest of the defencemen in the nation
- Set the Ohio State single-season record for points by a defenceman with 45 points, breaking the previous record set in the 2000–01 season
- Holds the Ohio State career record for points by a defenceman with 128. She ranks third in career scoring overall and second in career assists with 86
- Ranks second all-time in defenceman scoring in the WCHA

== Media career ==
=== Hockey broadcasting ===
On December 2, 2011, it was announced that Bonhomme would be joining Leafs TV to "appear and report on flagship programs for Leafs Today and Leafs@Practice, host Toronto FC telecasts on GOLTV Canada and share her unique insider perspective as an online contributor at www.mapleleafs.com" in addition to continuing to play hockey in the CWHL. Bonhomme stated that she grew up watching and cheering for the Leafs.

In September 2014, it was announced that Bonhomme would join TSN's SportsCentre as a host and reporter.

Bonhomme co-hosts the podcast Jocks in Jills with Julia Tocheri. The podcast is centred on women's hockey, and features interviews with current and upcoming PWHL players.

=== Other appearances ===
It was announced on October 5, 2010, that Bonhomme was one of several athletes selected to participate in an all-athletes episode of Wipeout Canada. The episode aired in April 2011. Bonhomme was a presenter at the 2011 Gemini Awards.

On August 22, 2011, CBC television announced that Bonhomme would compete in their figure skating competition TV program Battle of the Blades. She is the first female hockey player to be a competitor in Battle of the Blades. Bonhomme told the media that she couldn't wait to take on the NHL players and show them that women's hockey has come a long way, adding that she was honoured to be the first woman representing all those who play hockey and excited to be partnered with Olympic gold medallist David Pelletier. On November 14, 2011, it was announced that she and her partner were the winners of the 2011 competition.

In 2016, she appeared in the second season of the romcom series Man Seeking Woman.

In 2017, she appeared in the hockey comedy film Goon: Last of the Enforcers.

In 2019, Bonhomme appeared as herself in the 8th season of the CraveTV comedy series Letterkenny. In 2022, Bonhomme appeared as herself in the first season of the Letterkenny spinoff comedy series Shoresy. She has since appeared in all four seasons of the show.

Awards and achievements
Preceded by Inaugural	CWHL first overall draft pick 2010	Succeeded by Meghan Agosta
