= Alexandra Hoffmeyer =

American ice hockey player

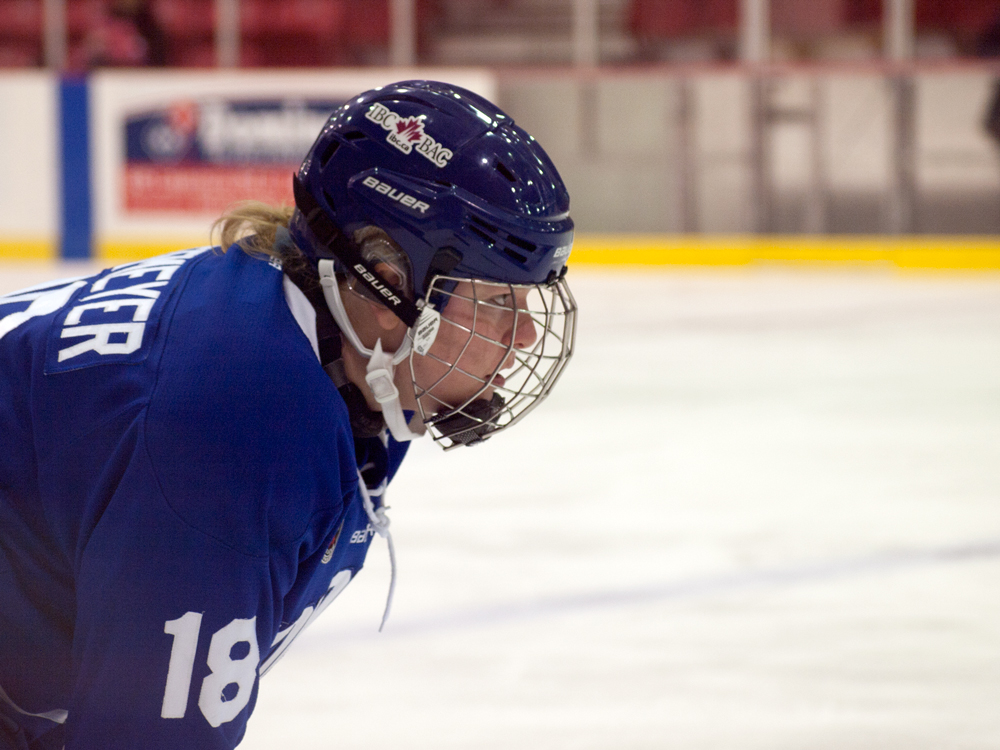
- Born: August 23, 1988 (age 38) Grand Blanc, Michigan, U.S.
- Height: 5 ft 4 in (163 cm)
- Shot: Right
- CWHL team: Toronto Furies
- Playing career: 2005–2015
Medal record
Women's ball hockey
Representing Canada
World Championship
Gold medal – first place	2015 Switzerland	Team

Alexandra "Lexie" Hoffmeyer (born August 23, 1988) is a former women's ice hockey player. Among her career accomplishments, she is a Clarkson Cup champion and earned a gold medal with Canada women's national ball hockey team at the 2015 ISBHF World Championships in Zug, Switzerland.

== Playing career ==
Hoffmeyer was a member of the Honeybaked team that won the Michigan State championship in 2005 and 2006.

=== NCAA ===
Her freshman season in the NCAA was played with the Mercyhurst Lakers women's ice hockey team in College Hockey America. Her first career NCAA goal came in a contest versus the Maine Black Bears on September 30, 2006. In an October 28, 2006 contest versus Providence, she would score her second career NCAA goal.

She transferred to the Maine Black Bears women's ice hockey team for the 2007-08 campaign. In her junior and senior years (2008–09, 2009–10), Hoffmeyer was the assistant captain for the Black Bears. In a January 2, 2010 match versus the Moncton Blue Eagles women's ice hockey program from Canadian Interuniversity Sport, Hoffmeyer logged a goal and an assist in a 4-2 victory for the Black Bears. She finished her NCAA career with 11 goals and 31 assists for a career total of 42 points.

=== CWHL ===
A charter member of the Toronto Furies, Hoffmeyer was selected 28th overall in the 2010 CWHL Draft, playing five seasons for the Furies. Logging her first career point as a member of the Furies on November 13, 2010, Hoffmeyer and Britini Smith would gain the assists on a goal scored by Meagan Aarts, in a 9-0 shutout win against the Burlington Barracudas.

Of note, she would score her first goal on January 15, 2011, in a 3-2 final against the Montreal Stars. Scoring against Kim St. Pierre, Angela Di Stasi was credited with the assist.

The last goal of her Furies career came on December 1, 2013 against the Calgary Inferno as she scored an empty net goal at the 17:10 mark of the third period. Her final CWHL point would come on January 11, 2014 as she logged an assist on the Furies first goal of the game, scored by Shannon Moulson.

During her CWHL career, she was part of the Furies team that captured the 2014 Clarkson Cup. Hoffmeyer would serve as an assistant coach on Sommer West's coaching staff during the 2015-16 Furies season. In addition, she has also served as part of the Furies' social media team.

=== Ball hockey ===
In the autumn of 2014, Hoffmeyer was named as one of the blueliners for the Canadian national women's team at the 2015 ISBHF World Street Hockey Championships in Zug, Switzerland. The Canadian team went on to capture the gold medal, posting an undefeated mark.

In Canada's 10-0 win over Italy, she would register an assist on a goal scored by Elysia Desmier. Hoffmeyer would also score Canada's first goal of the game in a 9-1 win against Switzerland. Of note, Hoffmeyer would also register points in the semifinals and the gold medal game. In the semis, Hoffmeyer earned an assist on Canada's first goal of the game, scored by April Drake. She would also log an assist in the gold medal game, a 5-1 win for Canada.

In addition, Hoffmeyer was a member of the Toronto Shamrocks roster that won the 2015 Canadian national ball hockey women's championships.

== Career stats ==
Season	Team	League	GP	G	A	Pts	+/-	PIM
2007-08	Maine	Hockey East	30	3	2	5		42
2008-09	Maine	Hockey East	33	4	14	18		56
2009-10	Maine	Hockey East	30	4	15	19		55
2010-11	Toronto Furies	CWHL	29	1	6	7	+1	22
2011-12	Toronto Furies	CWHL	27	4	3	7	+6	32
2012-13	Toronto Furies	CWHL	22	1	2	3	-1	38
2013-14	Toronto Furies	CWHL	23	1	3	4	+1	33
2014-15	Toronto Furies	CWHL	23	0	1	1	-15	16
