= Brooke Stacey =

Canadian Mohawk ice hockey player

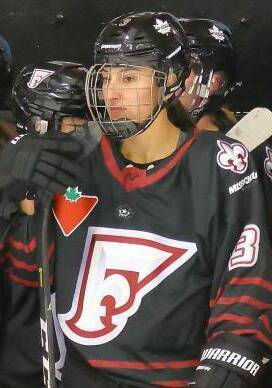
- Stacey with the Montreal Force in 2022
- Born: June 28, 1996 (age 29) Kahnawake, Québec, Canada
- Height: 5 ft 10 in (178 cm)
- Position: Forward
- Shoots: Left
- PWHL team Former teams: Montreal Victoire; Buffalo Beauts; Linköping HC; Maine Black Bears
- Playing career: 2014–present

Brooke Stacey (born June 26, 1996) is a Canadian ice hockey forward, currently on reserve with the Montreal Victoire of the Professional Women's Hockey League (PWHL). She is Kanien’kehá:ka (commonly known by the exonym 'Mohawk') and grew up in Kahnawake, a First Nations reserve on the St. Lawrence River in southern Québec.

== Playing career ==
Stacey signed with Linköping HC Dam in the Swedish Women's Hockey League (SDHL) for the 2018–19 postseason, after being invited by the club's general manager, Kim Martin Hasson. She would score one goal in two regular season games, before playing in all twelve playoff games, as the club lost in the finals to Luleå HF/MSSK.

Stacey signed with the Buffalo Beauts of the National Women's Hockey League (NWHL) for the 2019–20 NWHL season. She would score in each of her first five games and recorded eight goals and eight assists in the first 14 games of the season, before announcing that she was pregnant and stepping away from hockey for the remainder of the season. She was invited to play in the 2020 NWHL All-Star Game prior to the announcement and, despite being unable to play, was able to participate as a passer in the Accuracy Shooting competition and was introduced with Team Packer at the All-Star Game. Her place in the All-Star game was filled by her best friend, Metropolitan Riveters forward Cailey Hutchison.

In December 2020, she announced that she had re-signed with the Beauts for the 2020-21 season, stating that she wanted "to be a role model for new moms, showing that it is possible to compete at the highest level even after a couple of months postpartum."

== International play ==
Stacey represented Canada at the 2014 IIHF U18 World Championship, winning a gold medal.

== Awards and honours ==
- Finalist, 2021 NWHL Denna Laing Award

== Personal life ==
Stacey is the daughter of Tina McComber and Sean Stacey. She has two brothers, Dylan and Tye, and a younger sister, Savannah.

Outside of hockey, Stacey studied sociology at the University of Maine. She has expressed an interest in working towards a career in criminal investigation with specific interest in the area of missing and murdered Indigenous women.

In February 2020, Stacey and her partner, Dylan Smith, announced they were expecting their first child and she gave birth in the summer of 2020.
