= Cindy Eadie =

Canadian softball and ice hockey player

- Born: September 21, 1982 (age 43) Brantford, Ontario, Canada
- Height: 6 ft 0 in (183 cm)
- Weight: 176 lb (80 kg; 12 st 8 lb)
- Position: Goaltender
- Played for: Brampton Thunder (NWHL); Mississauga Ice Bears (NWHL); Wilfrid Laurier Golden Hawks
- Playing career: 2000–2008

Cindy Eadie (born September 21, 1982 in Brantford, Ontario) is a Canadian former professional softball third baseman and ice hockey goaltender.

Eadie began softball at age 5, and has attended Wilfrid Laurier University, where she played three seasons as starting goalie for the Wilfrid Laurier Golden Hawks women's ice hockey team and won numerous personal accolades, as well as leading her team to a national championship in 2005.

Eadie was a part of the Canada women's national softball team which finished 5th at the 2004 Summer Olympics, and was a member of the Brampton Thunder hockey team of the National Women's Hockey League. Eadie participated at the 2008 Esso Nationals and won the silver medal. She is also the Women's hockey assistant coach at Wilfrid Laurier.

== Awards and honours ==
- Led the CIS in shutouts (10) (2004–05)
- Led the CIS in goals against average (0.73) (2004–05)
- Led the CIS in and save percentage (.962) (2004–05)
- Nominee, BLG Award (2004–05)
- 2004/2005 Women's Hockey CIS Championship Tournament All-Star
- 2004/2005 Women's Hockey OUA League MVP
- 2004/2005 Women's Hockey CIS First Team All-Canadian
- 2004/2005 Women's Hockey OUA First Team All-Star
- 2004/2005 Women's Hockey OUA Goalie of the Year
- 2002/2003 Women's Hockey OUA Second Team All-Star
- 2001/2002 Women's Hockey CIS Rookie of the Year
- 2001/2002 Women's Hockey OUA League MVP
- 2001/2002 Women's Hockey OUA Goalie of the Year
- 2001/2002 Women's Hockey OUA First Team All-Star
- 2001/2002 Women's Hockey CIS First Team All-Canadian
- 2001/2002 Tissot Rookie of the Year (awarded to the CIS female rookie of the year)
- 2001/2002 Women's Hockey OUA Rookie of the Year

=== Wilfrid Laurier Awards ===
- 2004/2005 President's Award
- 2004/2005 Lisa Backman Award (awarded to the Wilfrid Laurier Most Valuable Player in women's ice hockey)
- 2001/2002 President's Award
- 2001/2002 Team Rookie of the Year (the award would be renamed the Cindy Eadie Award)
