= Kelly Paton =

- Born: April 16, 1988 (age 37) Woodstock, Ontario, Canada
- Height: 1.56 m (5 ft 1 in)
- Weight: 54 kg (119 lb; 8 st 7 lb)
- Position: Forward
- Shot: Left
- team: London Devilettes; New Hampshire Wildcats; ZSC Lions; Boston Blades
- Current coach: Laurier Golden Hawks
- Coached for: Western Mustangs; London Devilettes
- Playing career: 2005–2016
- Coaching career: 2015–present

Kelly Paton (born April 16, 1988) is a former ice hockey player and current coach. Paton is the head coach and manager of hockey operations with the Wilfrid Laurier Golden Hawks women's ice hockey program. In 2024, she won the BFL Canada Women in Coaching Award - High Performance Category (awarded by Hockey Canada). She served as head coach for the Canadian women's team in Ice hockey at the 2025 Winter World University Games, finishing with a silver medal.

== Playing career ==
Earning All-America honors in 2010, Paton accumulated 162 points in 141 career games with New Hampshire.

During the 2015–16 season, Paton appeared in one game for the Boston Blades as an emergency player. On November 22, 2015, she suited up for the Blades in a road game versus the Brampton Thunder, logging a pair of penalty minutes in a 3–0 loss.

== Coaching career ==
Paton served on the coaching staff for the London Devilettes of the Provincial Women's Hockey League.

During the 2015–16 season, she served as an assistant coach for the Western Mustangs women's hockey team. From 2016 to 2018, Paton was the Mustangs head coach. In 2018, she led the Mustangs to the McCaw Cup, the second in program history. Qualifying for the 2018 U Sports Women's Ice Hockey Championship, the Mustangs reached the finals versus the Manitoba Bisons, emerging with a silver medal.

Since 2018, Paton is the head coach for the Wilfrid Laurier Golden Hawks women's ice hockey. In the 2024–25 season, she was recognized as the OUA Coach of the Year. Among the highlights of the season, the Golden Hawks were nationally ranked for the first time since 2014, and they did not allow a shorthanded goal For 2025–26, she followed it up with a first-place finish in the OUA West Division, as the Golden Hawks won 21 of 26 games, emerging with the best record in the conference.

== Awards and honours ==
- Hockey East Player of the Month, October 2009
- Hockey East Player of the Month, November 2009
- Hockey East Player of the Month, February 2010
- 2010 Hockey East First-Team All-Star
- 2010 Hockey East Co-Player of the Year
- Finalist, 2010 Patty Kazmaier Award
- 2010 Frozen Four Skills Competition participant
- 2010 Women's RBK Hockey Division I All-America First Team

=== Coaching ===
- 2024 BFL Canada Women in Coaching Award - High Performance Category (awarded by Hockey Canada)
- 2024-25 OUA Coach of the Year
- 2025-26 OUA West Coach of the Year
