= Laurier Golden Hawks women's ice hockey =

- University: Wilfrid Laurier University
- Conference: OUA; West Division
- First season: 1994-95
- Head coach: Kelly Paton; 8th season
- Assistant coaches: Steve Langdon and Nik Knezic
- Captain(s): Hayley Szymanowski
- Arena: Golden Hawks Athletic Complex; Waterloo, Ontario
- Colors: Purple and Gold
- Mascot: Golden Hawk

U Sports tournament champions
- 2004-05

Conference tournament champions
- 1998-99, 2001-02, 2003-04, 2004-05, 2005-06, 2006-07, 2007-08, 2008-09, 2009-10, 2011-12, 2013-14

The Laurier Golden Hawks women's ice hockey team is the women's college ice hockey team that represents Wilfrid Laurier University in Waterloo, Ontario. The team competes as a member of the Ontario University Athletics (OUA), under the U Sports association. The Golden Hawks play their home games at Sunlife Financial Arena.

Since joining the OUA in the 1994–95 season, the team has won 11 OUA provincial titles and 1 U Sports national title (2004–05).

The current coach is former New Hampshire Wildcats Hockey East All-Star forward Kelly Paton, who took over in 2018. Also a former player for the Boston Blades, Paton had previously coached the Western Mustangs women's hockey team as well as the London Devilettes of the Provincial Women's Hockey League.

Prior to Paton, the head coach was Rick Osborne. Osborne joined the team in 2003 and brought the team to 9 provincial championships and the only national title they have won. He retired after 15 seasons.

== History ==
The Laurier women's ice hockey program began in the 1994–95 season and since the 1998–99 season has dominated women's hockey in the OUA Ontario University Athletics. They have been champions 10 times since that 1998 season. Winning the OUA championship in 1998/99, 2001/02, 2003/04, 2004/05, 2005/06, 2006/07, 2007/08, 2008/09, 2009/10, and 2011/12 seasons.

In the 2024–25 season, Paton was recognized as the OUA Coach of the Year. Among the highlights of the season, the Golden Hawks were nationally ranked for the first time since 2014, and they did not allow a shorthanded goal For 2025–26, she followed it up with a first-place finish in the OUA West Division, as the Golden Hawks won 21 of 26 games, emerging with the best record in the conference.

=== Season-by-season results ===
| Won championship | Lost championship | Conference champions | League leader |

Legend
| GP | Games played | W | Wins | L | Losses |
| SOW | Shootout Wins | SOL | Shootout Losses | PTS | Points |
| GF | Goals For | GA | Goals Against |

| Season | Coach | GP | W | L | SOW | SOL | PTS | Finish | GF | GA | Playoffs |
|---|---|---|---|---|---|---|---|---|---|---|---|
| 2025-26 | Kelly Paton | 26 | 21 | 5 | 1 | 1 | 60 | 1st, OUA West | 76 | 30 | Won First Round vs Brock, |
| 2024-25 | Kelly Paton | 26 | 17 | 9 | 1 | 1 | 49 | 3rd, OUA West | 63 | 47 | Lost, First Round vs Waterloo |
| 2023-24 | Kelly Paton | 28 | 13 | 5 | 3 | 1 | 38 | 3rd, OUA West | 61 | 68 | Lost, First Round vs Waterloo |
| 2022-23 | Kelly Paton | 26 | 4 | 22 | 1 | 2 | 15 | 6th, OUA West | 30 | 72 | Did not qualify |
| 2021-22 | Kelly Paton | 15 | 3 | 12 | 0 | 0 | | 13th, OUA | 13 | 31 | Did not qualify |

=== Season team scoring champion ===
| Year | Player | GP | G | A | PTS | PIM |
|---|---|---|---|---|---|---|
| 2025-26 | Clara Chisholm | 26 | 8 | 16 | 24 | 4 |
| 2024-25 | Clara Chisholm | 26 | 7 | 12 | 19 | 6 |
| 2023-24 | Hayley Szymanowski | 28 | 6 | 12 | 18 | 8 |
| 2022-23 | Hayley Szymanowski | 26 | 4 | 6 | 10 | 10 |
| 2021-22 | Emily Visser | 15 | 3 | 4 | 7 | 4 |

=== Team captains ===
- 2025-26: Hayley Szymanowski
- 2024-25: Hayley Szymanowski
- 2023-24: Hayley Szymanowski
- 2022-23: Steph Caleca C, Emily Lange A

== Awards and honours ==
- Forward - Andrea Ironside, 2008/2009 Women's Hockey U Sports Championship Tournament All-Star
- Forward - Andrea Ironside, Monday, November 24, 2008, Laurier Athlete of the Week
- Goaltender - Liz Knox, 2010 Outstanding Woman of Laurier
- Defence - Andrea Bevan, 2006/2007 Women's Hockey OUA Most Valuable Player
- Defence - Andrea Bevan, 2008/2009 Women's Hockey OUA Most Valuable Player

=== U Sports honours ===
- Defence - Andrea Bevan, 2004/2005 U Sports Women's Hockey All Rookie Team
- Defence - Andrea Bevan, 2006/2007 U Sports Women's Hockey First Team All-Canadian
- Defence - Andrea Bevan, 2006/2007 U Sports Tournament All-Star
- Defence - Andrea Bevan, 2007/2008 U Sports Women's Hockey First Team All-Canadian
- Defence - Andrea Bevan, 2008/2009 U Sports Women's Hockey First Team All-Canadian
- Forward - Andrea Ironside, 2009 Second Team
- Forward - Andrea Ironside, 2010 U Sports Tournament All-Star
- Goaltender - Liz Knox, 2010 Brodrick Trophy, U Sports MVP
- Goaltender - Liz Knox, 2010 All-U Sports First Team
- Defence - Alannah Wakefield, 2011 U Sports all-rookie team

=== U Sports Tournament honours ===
- Laurissa Kenworthy, 2007 U Sports Tournament All-Stars

=== Academic All-Canadian honours ===
- Kate Psota (2009)

=== All-Canadian honours ===
- Defence -Andrea Bevan, 2004/2005 U Sports Women's Hockey All Rookie Team
- Defence - Andrea Bevan, 2006/2007 U Sports Women's Hockey First Team All-Canadian
- Defence - Andrea Bevan, 2007/2008 U Sports Women's Hockey First Team All-Canadian
- Defence - Andrea Bevan, 2008/2009 U Sports Women's Hockey First Team All-Canadian
- Forward - Andrea Ironside, 2009 Second Team
- Defence - Alannah Wakefield, 2011 U Sports all-rookie team

=== OUA honours ===
- Andrea Bevan, 2006/2007 Women's Hockey OUA Most Valuable Player
- Andrea Bevan, 2008/2009 Women's Hockey OUA Most Valuable Player
- Clara Chisholm, 2024-25 OUA Rookie of the Year
- Arielle MacDonald, 2024-25 OUA True Sport Award
- Kelly Paton, 2024-25 OUA Coach of the Year
- Kelly Paton, 2025-26 OUA West Coach of the Year
- Sarah Howell, Laurier, 2025-26 OUA West Goaltender of the Year

==== OUA All-Stars ====
- Andrea Bevan, 2008/2009 Women's Hockey OUA First Team All-Star
- Andrea Ironside, 2008/2009 Women's Hockey OUA First Team All-Star
- Alicia Martin, 2011/2012 Women's Hockey OUA First Team All-Star

== Golden Hawks in pro hockey ==
| = CWHL All-Star | = NWHL All-Star | = Clarkson Cup Champion | = Isobel Cup Champion |

| Player | Position | Team(s) | League(s) | Years | Titles |
| Elysia Desmier | Forward | Brampton Thunder | CWHL | 2 | |
| Cindy Eadie | Goaltender | Brampton Thunder | CWHL | 2 | |
| Andrea Ironside | Forward | Brampton Thunder | CWHL | 2 | |
| Liz Knox | Goaltender | Brampton Thunder; Melbourne Ice; Markham Thunder | CWHL; AIWHL; CWHL 2019 CWHL All-Star Game captain | 7 | 2018 Clarkson Cup |
| Ashley Stephenson | Forward | Burlington Barracudas | CWHL | | |

=== International ===
- Andrea Bevan Canada: 2009 Winter Universiade (gold)
- Andrea Ironside Canada: 2009 Winter Universiade (gold)
- Liz Knox Canada: 2011 Winter Universiade (gold)
- Alicia MartinCanada: 2011 Winter Universiade (gold)
- Laura Brooker Canada: 2015 Winter Universiade (silver)
- Kelly Paton, Head Coach Canada: 2025 World Winter University Games (silver)
