= 2007–08 Maine Black Bears women's ice hockey season =

- Conference: HEA

Rankings
- USA Today/USA Hockey Magazine: Not ranked
- USCHO.com/CBS College Sports: Not ranked

Record
- Overall: 4-27-3
- Home: 11-2-3

Coaches and captains

In the 2007-08 Maine Black Bears women's ice hockey season, the Black Bears had 4 wins, 27 losses and 3 ties. The team’s Hockey East record was 3 wins, 15 losses, and 3 ties.

== Regular season ==
=== Schedule ===
Opponent	Score	Record
Sacred Heart	6-1	1-0-0
at Mercyhurst	0-4	1-1-0
at Mercyhurst	0-5	1-2-0
Providence*	2-2	1-2-1
at RPI	1-6	1-3-1
at RPI	1-3	1-4-1
at Boston College*	2-3	1-5-1
at New Hampshire*	0-5	1-6-1
Clarkson	0-2	1-7-1
Clarkson	0-1	1-8-1
Robert Morris	2-3	1-9-1
Robert Morris	2-3	1-10-1
Connecticut*	2-4	1-11-1
Boston University*	2-3	1-12-1
at Vermont*	0-0	1-12-2
at Providence*	2-7	1-13-2
at Providence*	0-4	1-14-2
at St. Lawrence	0-2	1-15-2
at St. Lawrence	1-9	1-16-2
at Wayne State	0-5	1-17-2
at Wayne State	3-4	1-18-2
Northeastern*	4-1	2-18-2
at Boston University*	1-1	2-18-3
at Boston University*	3-4	2-19-3
New Hampshire*	1-9	2-20-3
New Hampshire*	0-6	2-21-3
at Northeastern*	1-3	2-22-3
at Northeastern*	4-2	3-22-3
Boston College*	2-1	4-22-3
Boston College*	1-2	4-23-3
at Connecticut*	2-7	4-24-3
at Connecticut*	4-5	4-25-3
Vermont*	1-5	4-26-3
Vermont*	1-6	4-27-3
