= Maine Black Bears women's ice hockey =

- Current season
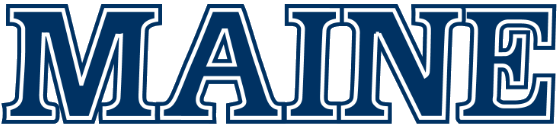
- University: University of Maine
- Conference: Hockey East; NCAA Division I Division
- Head coach: Molly Engstrom; 4th season
- Arena: Harold Alfond Sports Arena; Orono, Maine
- Student section: The Maine~iaks
- Colors: Maine blue, white, and navy

The Maine Black Bears women’s ice hockey team represents the University of Maine. The team plays their home games in Alfond Arena. The team's first year of play was in 1997–98. The Black Bears finished 6th in the 2019–2020 season, advancing to the semi-finals of the Hockey East tournament, before losing to the eventual champions Northeastern Huskies by a score of 1–3. The 2020 Hockey East women's ice hockey tournament was cancelled due to the Coronavirus outbreak, but Maine would not have qualified even if the tournament had been played. Hockey East announced plans in July 2020 to play the 2020–2021 hockey season, with an emphasis on league play. Maine is one of sixteen Division I programs to have never qualified for the NCAA women's ice hockey tournament.

== Coaches ==
The current head coach is Molly Engstrom. A native of Siren, Wisconsin, she spent the 2018–2022 seasons as the assistant coach at St. Cloud University. She is a two-time member of the United States women's hockey team at the Winter Olympics, won a bronze medal with Team USA in 2006 at the Turin Winter Games and a silver medal in 2010 at the Vancouver Winter Games. Engstrom earned the 'Best Defenseman' award at the 2010 Winter Games.

She was a member of Team USA at six IIHF World Women's Championships from 2004 to 2011, helping the team secure gold medals in 2005, 2008, 2009, and 2011, as well as silver medals in 2004 and 2007.

She has played and coached in the Swedish Women's Professional Hockey League (SDHL) from 2016 to 2018, and helped her team Djurgarden IF win the SDHL championship in 2017. She served as the girls' varsity hockey head coach and assistant athletic director at Kimball Union Academy in Meriden, N.H. from 2014–2016.

In addition to her professional playing and coaching experience in Sweden, Engstrom played professional hockey with teams in Minneapolis, Toronto and Boston in the CWHL and NWHL from 2007 to 2013. She helped her Brampton-Canadette Thunder team win the CWHL title in 2008 and the Minnesota Whitecaps win the Western Women's Hockey League crown in 2009.

A 2007 graduate of the University of Wisconsin, Engstrom played collegiate hockey in the WCHA with the Badgers. She received First Team All-American honors while at Wisconsin and was also named the WCHA Defensive Player of the Year in 2004 and 2005. She was selected as a Patty Kazmaier Award top 10 finalist in 2005.

She went on to receive a Masters of Sports Administration from the Russian International Olympic University in 2014.

Richard Reichenbach served as head coach from 2015 to 2022. In the 2019–20 season, his fifth year in the role, he led Maine to a 15–14–8 record. Before coaching at the University of Maine, Reichenbach was an assistant coach at Cortland State. Reichenbach is a 2006 graduate of Hamilton College, where he was a hockey and lacrosse standout. He was team captain in his senior year. He played one year of professional hockey, on the Richmond Renegades of the SPHL.

Maria Lewis served as the head coach for the Bears for four seasons and was named Hockey East Coach of the Year in 2012. That season, the Bears finished fourth in the Hockey East conference with an overall record of 17–11–6. Prior to taking on the head coach responsibilities at Maine, Lewis was an assistant coach for Mercyhurst Lakers women's ice hockey team, where she twice won the College Hockey Assistant Coach of the year award. She was also an assistant coach with the Ohio State Buckeyes and the University of North Dakota Fighting Hawks.

Dan Lichterman became the third head coach for the Black Bears for the 2007–2008 season and coached for three seasons. He left at the end of his first contract, citing the need to support his wife's career.

Lauren Steblen, associate coach under Guy Perron, stepped in as interim coach in the 2006–2007 season. Steblen played defense for the Bears as a college player, and in her senior season, 2000–2001, the team made the Hockey East tournament for the first time. After graduating from Maine, she coached the Bemidji State Beavers, in Minnesota. At the end of her year as interim head coach, she decided not to pursue the permanent post.

Guy Perron was hired as the second head coach of the Black Bears. A graduate of UM, Perron was a two-time captain for the team and recorded a career total of 62 goals and 84 assists, amassing 146 points in 136 games. Perron coached the Black Bears to a 17–9–6 season in his second year. He left the following season to be the associate head coach and recruiting director for Maine's men's ice hockey program. He later became a scout for the Colorado Avalanche in the NHL.

Rick Filighera was the inaugural head coach for the Maine Black Bears' program, and oversaw the program for its first seven seasons. He came to Maine from a head coaching position with the Rochester Institute of Technology's women's hockey team. In 2003–2004, he was the runner up for the Hockey East Coach of the Year award. After leaving Maine in 1997, he became the head coach for Gilmour Academy in Gates Mills, Ohio. As of 2020–2021, he was the head coach for the Cortland Red Dragons, in the Northeast Women's Hockey League.

== Season-by-season results ==
Won championship	Lost championship	Conference champions	League leader

Year	Coach	W	L	T	Conference	Conf. W	Conf. L	Conf. T	Finish	Conference Tournament	NCAA Tournament
2024–25	Molly Engstrom	11	21	3	Hockey East	10	14	3	6th HE	Lost Quarterfinals vs. Boston College (3–4)	Did not qualify
2023–24	Molly Engstrom	15	18	2	Hockey East	11	14	2	8th HE	Won Quarterfinals vs. Merrimack (1–2 OT)	Did not qualify
2022–23	Molly Engstrom	15	18	2	Hockey East	12	13	2	6th HE	Lost Quarterfinals vs. Providence (2–5)	Did not qualify
2021–22	Richard Reichenbach	15	19	1	Hockey East	12	13	1	5th HE	Won Quarterfinals vs. Boston College (2–1); Lost Semifinals vs. Northeastern (1–3)	Did not qualify
2020–21	Richard Reichenbach	8	9	1	Hockey East	7	8	1	7th HE	Won Quarterfinals vs. Vermont (3–1); Lost Semifinals vs. Providence (0–1 OT)	Did not qualify
2019–20	Richard Reichenbach	15	14	8	Hockey East	9	11	7	7th HE	Won Quarterfinals vs. Boston University (3–2, 2–1); Lost Semifinals vs. Northeastern (1–3)	Did not qualify
2018–19	Richard Reichenbach	14	15	5	Hockey East	7	15	5	9th HE	Did not qualify	Did not qualify
2017–18	Richard Reichenbach	19	14	5	Hockey East	11	9	4	3rd HE	Won First Round vs. Boston University (3–2, 1–4, 4–3 OT); Lost Semifinals vs. Northeastern (1–2)	Did not qualify
2016–17	Richard Reichenbach	10	21	1	Hockey East	6	17	1	9th HE	Did not qualify	Did not qualify
2015–16	Richard Reichenbach	10	23	2	Hockey East	6	17	1	8th HE	Lost Quarterfinals vs. Boston College (2–5, 1–5)	Did not qualify
2014–15	Richard Reichenbach	10	20	3	Hockey East	9	11	1	4th HE	Lost Quarterfinals vs. Northeastern (2–3, 0–1 OT)	Did not qualify
2013–14	Maria Lewis	7	20	5	Hockey East	5	13	3	5th HE	Lost Quarterfinals vs. Vermont (2–3 3OT)	Did not qualify
2012–13	Maria Lewis	5	24	4	Hockey East	3	16	3	7th HE	Lost Quarterfinals vs. Boston College (1–2 OT)	Did not qualify
2011–12	Maria Lewis	17	11	6	Hockey East	11	8	2	4th He	Lost Quarterfinals vs. Providence (0–6)	Did not qualify
2010–11	Maria Lewis	12	17	5	Hockey East	6	12	3	6th HE	Lost Quarterfinals vs. Providence (2–5)	Did not qualify
2009–10	Dan Lichterman	6	20	5	Hockey East	3	15	3	8th HE	Did not qualify	Did not qualify
2008–09	Dan Lichterman	5	23	5	Hockey East	2	15	4	8th He	Did not qualify	Did not qualify
2007–08	Dan Lichterman	4	27	3	Hockey East	3	15	3	7th HE	Did not qualify	Did not qualify
2006–07	Lauren Steblen	10	19	2	Hockey East	5	14	2	6th HE	Did not qualify	Did not qualify
2005–06	Guy Perron	17	9	6	Hockey East	9	8	4	4th HE	Lost Semifinals vs. New Hampshire (0–6)	Did not qualify
2004–05	Guy Perron	14	15	3	Hockey East	5	13	2	5th HE	Did not qualify	Did not qualify
2003–04	Rick Filighera	12	16	4	Hockey East	9	9	2	3rd HE	Lost Semifinals vs. Providence (2–4)	Did not qualify
2002–03	Rick Filighera	12	15	4	Hockey East	5	8	2	3rd HE	Lost Semifinals vs. New Hampshire (0–2)	Did not qualify
2001–02	Rick Filighera	16	15	4	ECAC Eastern	8	10	3	5th ECAC E.	Lost Quarterfinals vs. Providence (3–5)	Did not qualify
2000–01	Rick Filighera	15	14	1	ECAC	10	13	1	9th ECAC	Did not qualify	Did not qualify
1999–2000	Rick Filighera	6	19	2	ECAC	3	19	2	11th ECAC	Did not qualify	Did not qualify
1998–99	Rick Filighera	9	18	1	ECAC	7	18	1	11th ECAC	Did not qualify	Did not qualify
1997–98	Rick Filighera	12	6	2							

== Team Scoring Champions ==
Season	Player	GP	G	A	Pts
2001–02	Meagan Aarts				47
2002–03					
2003–04					
2004–05					
2005–06					
2006–07					
2007–08					
2008–09					
2009–10					
2010–11	Myriam Croussette	34	14	12	26
2011–12					
2012–13	Brittany Dougherty	32	19	13	32
2013–14	Audra Richards	30	15	3	18
2014–15	Emilie Brigham	33	8	10	18
2015–16	Audra Richards	35	14	9	23
2016–17	Tereza Vanišová	28	16	12	28
2017–18	Tereza Vanisova	37	16	30	46
2018–19	Celine Tedenby	31	12	14	26
2019–20	Ida Kuoppala	35	19	14	33
2020–21	Ida Kuoppala	16	10	5	15
2021–22	Ida Kuoppala	35	10	14	24
2022–23	Mira Seregely	35	11	13	24

== Team captains ==
In progress

- 1997–98: Alana Ahearn
- 1998–99: Alison Lorenz, Christina Hedges
- 1999-00: Kelly Nelson
- 2000–01: Kelly Nelson
- 2001–02: Mandy Cronin, Jarin Sjorgen
- 2002–03: Jarin Sjorgen
- 2003–04: Lara Smart
- 2004–05: Tristian Desmet, Emily Stevens
- 2005–06: Cheryl White, Morgan Janusc
- 2006–07: Kelly Law, Sonia Corriveau
- 2007–08: Jenna Cowan
- 2008–09: Vanessa Vani
- 2009–10: Amy Stech
- 2010–11: Dawn Sullivan
- 2011–12: Dawn Sullivan
- 2012–13: Kylie Smith, Chloe Tinkler
- 2013–14: Jennifer More, Brittney Huneke
- 2014–15: Jennifer More (C), Brittney Huneke, Katy Massey (A)
- 2015–16: Abby Cooke, Emilie Brigham (C), Brooklyn Langlois, Eve Boissoneault (A)
- 2016–17: Emilie Brigham, Jess Vallotton
- 2017–18: Alyson Matteau (C), Brooke Stacey, Cailey Hutchinson (A)
- 2018–19: Jillian Flynn
- 2019–20: Jillian Flynn
- 2020–21: Taylor Leech
- 2021–22: Taylor Leech
- 2022–23: Morgan Trimper (C), Alexandra Johnson (A)
- 2023–24: Elise Morphy (C), Kennedy Little (A), Ida Kuoppala (A), Ana LaRose (A)
- 2024–25: Elise Morphy (C), Danielle Brunette (A) Adriana van de Leest (A), Alyssa Wruble (A)
- 2025–26: Danielle Brunette (C), Lily Fetch (A), Mikayla Boarder (A), Ava Stevenson (A)

== Current roster ==
=== 2025–26 Black Bears ===
As of January 6, 2026.

No.	Nat.	Player	Class	Pos	Height	DoB	Hometown	Previous team
4		Jaidyn Britt	Junior	D	5' 8" (1.73 m)		Crystal Lake, Illinois	St. Cloud State University
5		Campbell "Lulu" Rucinski	Freshman	D	5' 7" (1.7 m)	2007-02-06	Orono, Minnesota	Benilde-St. Margaret's
6		Gracie Hanson	Sophomore	F	5' 5" (1.65 m)	2006-01-16	Lakeville, Minnesota	Minnesota Jr. Whitecaps
7		Lily Fetch (A)	Junior	F	5' 4" (1.63 m)	2005-04-20	Woodbury, Minnesota	Minnesota Jr. Whitecaps
8		Lila Shea	Junior	F	5' 9" (1.75 m)		Braintree, Massachusetts	Thayer Academy
9		Sophia Johnson	Junior	D	5' 11" (1.8 m)	2005-06-29	Palmer, Alaska	Gilmour Academy
10		Camille Dubuc	Freshman	D	5' 8" (1.73 m)	2006-08-15	Edina, Minnesota	Edina High School
11		Isabelle Michaud	Freshman	F	5' 5" (1.65 m)	2007-12-20	Drummond, New Brunswick	Stanstead College
12		Sade Sandilands	Freshman	D	5' 7" (1.7 m)	2007-06-23	Carstairs, Alberta	Etobicoke Dolphins
13		Mikayla Boarder (A)	Junior	F	5' 8" (1.73 m)	2004-04-24	Richland, Washington	Shawnigan Lake School
14		Haley Ryan	Junior	F	5' 4" (1.63 m)		Conception Bay South, Newfoundland and Labrador	Eastern Ice Breakers
15		Danielle Brunette (C)	Senior	F	5' 7" (1.7 m)	2004-04-16	Chisago, Minnesota	University of Minnesota Duluth
16		Raegan Wurm	Freshman	F	5' 5" (1.65 m)	2005-01-06	Buffalo, Minnesota	Minnesota Jr. Whitecaps
17		Ali Altiman	Freshman	F	5' 4" (1.63 m)		Thamesville, Ontario	London Devilettes
18		Frederikke Foss	Sophomore	F	5' 8" (1.73 m)	2005-02-12	Gentofte, Denmark	Shattuck-Saint Mary's
19		Ava Stevenson (A)	Senior	F	5' 9" (1.75 m)	2004-01-08	Grosse Pointe, Michigan	Little Caesars
20		Mackenzie Podewell	Freshman	F	5' 6" (1.68 m)		Wheaton, Illinois	Chicago Mission
22		Brenna Curl	Sophomore	D	5' 7" (1.7 m)	2006-07-07	Bismark, North Dakota	Century Patriots
23		Stephanie Jacob	Sophomore	F	5' 6" (1.68 m)	2006-09-23	Winnipeg, Manitoba	Winnipeg Ice
26		Kendall Sundby	Sophomore	D	5' 3" (1.6 m)	2005-09-20	Hammond, Wisconsin	Team Wisconsin
28		Paige Fong	Freshman	D	5' 10" (1.78 m)		Pickering, Ontario	Whitby Wolves
29		Darragh Browne	Freshman	F	5' 5" (1.65 m)	2007-06-18	Oakville, Ontario	Burlington Barracudas
31		Julia Bachetti	Junior	G	5' 8" (1.73 m)	2004-05-24	Tecumseh, Ontario	St. Cloud State University
33		Kiia Lahtinen	Sophomore	G	5' 8" (1.73 m)	2003-11-16	Porvoo, Finland	HIFK Women's Team
35		Laurie Deguire	Freshman	G	5' 6" (1.68 m)		Quebec City, Quebec	Milton Academy
38		Madisyn Ryan	Sophomore	G	5' 9" (1.75 m)	2006-02-20	Corona, California	Florida Alliance AAA

== Black Bears in Pro Hockey ==
= CWHL All-Star Team	= NWHL All-Star	= Clarkson Cup Champion	= Isobel Cup Champion

Player	Position	Team(s)	League(s)	Years	Clarkson Cup	Isobel Cup
Meagan Aarts	Forward	Vaughan Flames; Toronto Furies	CWHL	6	1 (2014)	
Amalie Andersen	Defense	Rögle BK	NDHL	2		
Emilie Brigham	Forward	DEC Salzburg Eagles	EWHL	3		
Amanda Cronin	Goaltender	Toronto Aeros; Brampton Thunder; Boston Blades; Burlington Barracudas	NWHL; CWHL	7		
Jamie Grinder	Defense	DEC Salzburg Eagles	EWHL	1		
Ann-Frédérique Guay	Forward	Linköping HC; HC Fribourg-Gottéron	SDHL; SWHL A	2		
Mariah Fujimagari	Goaltender	SKP Bratislava; Worcester Blades; Buffalo Beauts; Connecticut Whale; AIK; Norfolk Admirals; Malmö Redhawks	EWHL; CWHL; NWHL NWHL/PHF; SDHL; ECHL; NDHL	8		
Lexie Hoffmeyer	Forward/Defense	Toronto Furies	CWHL	5	1 (2014)	
Cailey Hutchison	Forward	Metropolitan Riveters; Connecticut Whale	NWHL; PHF	3		
Carly Jackson	Goaltender	Buffalo Beauts; Toronto Six; PWHL Toronto/Toronto Sceptres; Seattle Torrent	NWHL; PHF; PWHL	6		
Ally Johnson	Forward	Skellefteå AIK	SDHL	1		
Kayla Kaluzny	Forward	Melbourne Ice	AWIHL	1		
Ida Kuoppala	Forward	Skellefteå AIK	SDHL	2		
Taylor Leech	Defense	Ladies Team Lugano; Leksands IF	SWHL A SDHL	2		
Alyson Matteau	Defense	Buffalo Beauts	NWHL	1		
Brittany Ott	Goaltender	Boston Blades; Boston Pride	CWHL; NWHL	5	1 (2015)	1 (2016)
Jenna Ouellette	Forward	DHC Langenthal	LKA	1		
Audra Morrison	Forward	Metropolitan Riveters Minnesota Whitecaps	NWHL NWHL/PHF	4		
Mira Seregély	Forward	HK Budapest	DFEL	1		
Brooke Stacey	Forward	Linköping HC; Buffalo Beauts; Montreal Force; PWHL Montreal	SDHL; NWHL; PHF; PWHL	5		
Celine Tedenby	Forward	Brynäs IF Skellefteå AIK	SDHL	2		
Darya Teryoshkina	Defense	HC Tornado	ZhHL	1		
Adriana van de Leest	Defense	HV71	SDHL	1		
Tereza Vanišová	Forward	Boston Pride; Leksands IF; Toronto Six; PWHL Montreal; PWHL Ottawa/Ottawa Charge; Vancouver Goldeneyes	NWHL/PHF; SDHL; PHF; PWHL	6		1 (2021)
Anna Zíková	Forward/Defense	Göteborg HC HPK Lakers Kärnten	SDHL NSML EWHL	3		

== Olympians ==
Player	Maine Tenure	Team	Position	Year	Finish
Amalie Andersen	2019-2023	Denmark	Defense	2022 Beijing	10th
Rahel Enzler	2020-2024	Switzerland	Forward	2022 Beijing; 2026 Milano Cortina	4th
Ida Kuoppala	2019-2024	Finland	Forward	2026 Milano Cortina	
Darcia Leimgruber	2009-2010	Switzerland	Forward	2010 Vancouver	5th
Vendula Přibylová	2016-2020	Czech Republic	Forward	2022 Beijing; 2026 Milano Cortina	7th
Tereza Vanišová	2016-2020	Czech Republic	Forward	2022 Beijing; 2026 Milano Cortina	7th
Michelle Weis	2017-2021	Denmark	Forward	2022 Beijing	10th
Lilli Welcke	2022-23	Germany	Forward	2026 Milano Cortina	2nd Place, Group B
Luisa Welcke	2022-23	Germany	Forward	2026 Milano Cortina	2nd Place, Group B
Raffi Wolf	1999-2003	Germany	Forward	2002 Salt Lake City; 2006 Vancouver	6th 5th

== Awards and honors ==
=== Hockey East ===
- Amy Stech (2006–10), Runner up, 2010 Hockey East Sportsmanship Award
- Brittany Ott (2009–13), 2010 WHEA All-Rookie Team
- Katy Massey (2011–15), 2012-13 Co-Top Scholar-Athlete
- Meghann Treacy (2012–16), 2014–15 Hockey East First Team All-Star
- Tereza Vanisov (2016–20), 2016-17 Co-Rookie of the Year
- Elise Morphy (2020–25), 2025 Hockey East Academic Champion

=== Hockey East monthly honors ===
- Jenna Ouellette (2006–10), Player of the Month: December 2009
- Brittany Ott (2009–13), Goaltender of the Month: January 2012
- Tori Pasquariello (2011–15), Pro Ambitions Rookie of the Month: November 2011
- Meghann Treacy (2012–16), Goaltender of the Month: October 2014, November 2014
- Carly Jackson (2015–20), Defensive Player of the Month (January 2019)
- Tereza Vanisova (2016–20)
  - Co-Rookie of the Month: November 2016
  - Co-Player of the Month: November 2019
- Ida Kuoppala (2019–24)
  - Pro Ambitions Rookie of the Month: January 2020, February 2020
  - Player of the Month: October 2023, December 2023
- Elise Morphy (2020–25), Defender of the Month: December 2023
- Lilli Welcke (2022–23), Pro Ambitions Rookie of the Month: November 2022
- Luisa Welcke (2022–23), Pro Ambitions Rookie of the Month: December 2022
- Sam Morrison (2023–25), Rookie of the Month: February 2024
- Adriana van de Leest (2023–25), Player of the Month: December 2024
- Kiia Lahtinen (2024–present), Goaltender of the Month: December 2024, February, 2025

=== Hockey East weekly honors ===
- Hockey East Team of the Week: September 27, 2010, February 14, 2011, February 21, 2011, September 26, 2011, October 31, 2011, November 28, 2011, January 16, 2012
- Jennie Gallo (2007–11), Pure Hockey Player of the Week: February 21, 2011
- Myriam Croussette (2008–12), Pure Hockey Player of the Week: February 14, 2011
- Melissa Gagnon (2008–12), Defensive Player of the Week: September 26, 2011
- Brittany Dougherty (2009–13)
  - Pure Hockey Player of the Week: September 27, 2010, November 29, 2010
  - Athletic Republic Player of the Week: October 31, 2011, December 17, 2013
- Brittany Ott (2009–13)
  - Defensive Player of the Week: September 27, 2010, October 11, 2010, November 29, 2010, October 31, 2011, November 28, 2011, January 16, 2012, November 12, 2012
  - Co-Defensive Player of the Week: January 23, 2012
- Jenny Kistner (2010–11), Pro Ambitions Rookie of the Week: awarded September 27, 2010
- Danielle Ward (2010–12)
  - Pure Hockey Player of the Week: September 26, 2011
  - Athletic Republic Co-Player of the Week: October 10, 2011
- Jennifer More (2011–15)
  - Pro Ambitions Rookie of the Week: September 26, 2011, January 16, 2012
  - Warrior Hockey Player of the Week: January 26, 2015
- Tori Pasquariello (2011–15), Pro Ambitions Rookie of the Week: November 14, 2011
- Shawna Lesperance (2012–15), Warrior Hockey Player of the Week: December 16, 2013
- Kelsey MacSorley (2012–16), Warrior Hockey Player of the Week: September 29, 2014
- Audra Richards (2012–16)
  - Pro Ambitions Rookie of the Week: December 17, 2012
  - Warrior Hockey Player of the Week: October 27, 2014, November 16, 2015
  - Warrior Hockey Co-Player of the Week: February 24, 2014, October 5, 2015
- Meghann Treacy (2012–16), Defensive Player of the Week: October 14, 2013, January 20, 2014, October 26, 2015
- Karissa Kirkup (2013–14), Pro Ambitions Rookie of the Week: December 9, 2013
- Emilie Brigham (2013–17), Pro Ambitions Rookie of the Week: December 16, 2013, March 3, 2014
- Mariah Fujimagari (2013–17), Pro Ambitions Rookie of the Week: December 2, 2013
- Brooke Stacey (2014–18), Player of the Week: February 26, 2018
- Alyson Matteau (2015–19)
  - Pro-Ambitions Rookie of the Week: November 2, 2015
  - Co-Defensive Player of the Week: November 14, 2016
  - Player of the Week: January 16, 2017
- Carly Jackson (2015–20)
  - Pro-Ambitions Rookie of the Week: October 17, 2016
  - Defensive Player of the Week: January 8, 2018
- Vendula Pribyova (2016–20), Player of the Week: October 15, 2018
- Tereza Vanisova (2016–20)
  - Pro-Ambitions Rookie of the Week: September 26, 2016
  - Player of the Week: November 14, 2016, October 8, 2018
- Michelle Weis (2017–21), Pro Ambitions Rookie of the Week: October 2, 2017, November 13, 2017
- Taylor Leech (2017–22), Defender of the Week: October 12, 2021, February 28, 2022
- Loryn Porter (2017–22)
  - Pro Ambitions Rookie of the Week: October 16, 2017
  - Defensive Player of the Week: December 21, 2020, January 25, 2021, March 1, 2021
  - Co-Defensive Player of the Week: November 25, 2019
  - Goaltender of the Week: November 22, 2021
- Celine Tedenby (2018–22)
  - Pro Ambitions Rookie of the Week: November 26, 2018, January 28, 2019
  - Co-Player of the Week: February 21, 2022
- Ida Kuoppala (2019–24)
  - Pro Ambitions Rookie of the Week: January 20, 2020, February 3, 2020, March 2, 2020
  - ARMY ROTC Co-Player of the Week: February 15, 2021
  - Co-Player of the Week: January 18, 2022
  - Player of the Week: October 9, 2023, October 23, 2023, November 20, 2023, February 26, 2024
- Morgan Sadler (2020–23), Pro Ambitions Rookie of the Week: November 23, 2020
- Rahel Enzler (2020–24), Pro Ambitions Rookie of the Week: February 15, 2021
- Jorden Mattison (2020–24), Stop It Goaltending Goaltender of the Week: October 24, 2022, February 13, 2023)
- Elise Morphy (2020–25), Defender of the Week: November 20, 2023, January 2, 2024
- Mira Seregély (2021–25)
  - Pro Ambitions Rookie of the Week: February 1, 2022
  - Co-Player of the Week:January 23, 2023
- Brooklyn Oakes (2022–23), Pro Ambitions Rookie of the Week, October 10, 2022
- Luisa Welcke (2022–23), Pro Ambitions Rookie of the Week: November 28, 2022
- Ann-Frederique Guay (2023–24), Player of the Week: November 6, 2023, January 2, 2024
- Ashley Kokavec (2023–24), Pro Ambitions Rookie of the Week: October 9, 2023
- Sam Morrison (2023–25), Pro Ambitions Rookie of the Week: February 26, 2024
- Adriana van de Leest (2023–25), Co-Player of the Week: January 13, 2025
- Julia Bachetti (2023–present)
  - Pro Ambitions Rookie of the Week: November 20, 2023, December 4, 2023
  - Goaltender of the Week: January 27, 2025
- Haley Ryan (2023–present), Pro Ambitions Rookie of the Week: December 11, 2023
- Kiia Lahtinen (2024–present), Goaltender of the Week: February 10, 2025, February 17, 2025, October 20, 2025)
- Kendall Sundby (2024–present), Defender of the Week: February 17, 2025
- Lulu Rucinski (2025–present), Defender of the Week: October 20, 2025, January 5, 2026

=== HCA Awards ===
- Ida Kuoppala (2019–24), Women's Hockey Commissioners Association Rookie of the Month: February 2020
- Kiia Lahtinen (2024–present), Hockey Commissioners Association National Rookie of the Month: February 2025
