= 2008–09 Maine Black Bears women's ice hockey season =

- Conference: Hockey East
- Home ice: Alfond Arena

Rankings
- USA Today/USA Hockey Magazine: Not ranked
- USCHO.com/CBS College Sports: Not ranked

Record
- Overall: 5-23-5

Coaches and captains
- Head coach: Dan Lichterman
- Alternate captain: Lexie Hoffmeyer

The 2008-09 season was the 11th season for the Black Bears. The Black Bears had an overall record of 5 wins, 23 losses and 5 ties. Their Hockey East conference record was 4 wins, 15 losses and 2 ties. Jennie Gallo led the team in goals for the second consecutive year. Myriam Croussette led all freshman in scoring and Jenna Ouellette led the team with five power play goals

== Regular season ==
=== Schedule ===
Date	Opponent	Score	Attendance	Record	Maine goalie	Maine goal scorers
Oct 3	North Dakota	W, 3-2	325	1-0-0	Turgeon	Hoffmeyer, Ouellette, Stech
Oct 4	North Dakota	L, 3-7	217	1-1-0	Turgeon	Stech, Ouellette, Vani
Oct 10	Minnesota State	L, 2-5	169	1-2-0	Turgeon	Vani, Hoffmeyer
Oct 11	Minnesota State	L, 0-4	145	1-3-0	Turgeon	
Oct 17	Sacred Heart	L, 2-3	152	1-4-0	Turgeon	Hoffmeyer, Barton
Oct 18	Sacred Heart	W, 11-1	89	2-4-0	Currier	Gagnon, Croussette, Stech, Gallo (3), Cyr, Goutsis, Ouellette, Sullivan, Barton
*Oct 25	Boston University	L, 1-8	302	2-5-0	Turgeon	Goutsis
*Oct 26	Providence College	L, 2-4	208	2-6-0	Turgeon	Norum, Bond
*Nov 8	University of Connecticut	L, 2-5	175	2-7-0	Turgeon	Gallo (2)
*Nov 9	Northeastern	L, 1-4	165	2-8-0	Turgeon	Colliton
*Nov 14	New Hampshire	L, 1-7	232	2-9-0	Turgeon	Gallo
*Nov 16	Boston College	W, 5-3	482	3-9-0	Turgeon	Stech (2), Ouellette, Colliton, Barton
*Nov 25	Vermont	T, 2-2	263	3-9-1	Turgeon	Peacock (2)
Nov 28	Robert Morris	L, 2-4	578	3-10-1	Turgeon	Ouellette, Croussette
Nov 29	Robert Morris	L, 4-5	538	3-11-1	Currier	Ouellette, Sullivan, Thomas, Gallo
*Dec 5	Providence	L, 1-4	162	3-12-1	Turgeon	Vani
*Dec 6	Providence	L, 1-4	154	3-13-1	Turgeon	Ouellette
Dec 12	Union	W 2-0	76	4-13-1	Turgeon	Stech, Vani
Dec 13	Union	T, 2-2	152	4-13-2	Currier	Hoffmeyer, Sullivan
Jan 9	Clarkson	L, 2-3	335	4-14-2	Turgeon	Gallo, Stech
Jan 10	Clarkson	L, 1-4	277	4-15-2	Turgeon	Stech
*Jan 17	Boston University	L, 2-5	562	4-16-2	Turgeon	Ouellette, Bond
*Jan 18	Boston University	L, 1-5	123	4-17-2	Turgeon	Gallo
*Jan 23	New Hampshire	L, 0-3	602	4-18-2	Turgeon	
*Jan 24	New Hampshire	L, 1-5	662	4-19-2	Turgeon	Gallo
*Jan 30	Northeastern	W, 4-2	49	5-19-2	Turgeon	Colliton, Croussette (2), Vani
*Jan 31	Northeastern	T, 2-2	231	5-19-3	Turgeon	Gallo, Vani
*Feb 7	Boston College	L, 0-2	207	5-20-3	Turgeon	
*Feb 8	Boston College	L, 2-6	159	5-21-3	Turgeon	Gallo, Ouellette
*Feb 13	Connecticut	L, 1-3	121	5-22-3	Turgeon	Croussette
*Feb 14	Connecticut	T, 2-2	261	5-22-4	Turgeon	Croussette, Norum
*Feb 21	Vermont	L, 0-1	414	5-23-4	Turgeon	
*Feb 22	Vermont	T, 2-2	318	5-23-5	Turgeon	Vani (2)

=== Highlights ===
- October 17–18: Abby Barton scored goals in back-to-back games against Sacred Heart
- October 18: Jennie Gallo had a hat-trick and two assists against Sacred Heart. Myriam Croussette scored her first collegiate goal and had three assists in the game. Dawn Sullivan scored her first collegiate goal against Sacred Heart
- November 16: Abby Barton scored a goal in the upset over Boston College
- January 30: Myriam Croussette scored twice and notched an assist against Northeastern
- February 13–14: Myriam Croussette scored a goal in back-to-back games versus Connecticut

== Player stats ==
=== Skaters ===
Player	Games played	Goals	Assists	Points
Vanessa Vani	33	8	20	28
Jennie Gallo	31	12	11	23
Jenna Ouellette	33	9	9	18
Lexie Hoffmeyer	33	4	14	18
Myriam Croussette	33	6	11	17
Amy Stech	33	8	3	11
Dawn Sullivan	32	3	6	9
Jordan Colliton	31	3	4	7
Melissa Gagnon	33	1	6	7
Jessica Bond	33	2	4	6
Elyce Thomas	29	1	5	6
Ashley Norum	33	2	3	5
Abby Barton	32	3	1	4
Dominique Goutsis	30	2	2	4
Taryn Peacock	15	2	1	3
Danielle Cyr	33	1	0	1
Madelene Eriksson	2	0	0	0
Candice Currier	4	0	0	0
Genevieve Turgeon	30	0	0	0
Kaitlin Zeek	33	0	0	0

=== Goaltenders ===
Player	Games played	Wins	Losses	Ties	Minutes	Goals Against	Goals Against Average	Saves	Save Percentage	Shutouts
Genevieve Turgeon	30	4	22	4	1800:34	108	3.60	975	.900	1
Candice Currier	4	1	1	1	195:47	8	2.45	70	.897	0

== Awards and honors ==
- Abby Barton was named a Maine Scholar-Athlete Award winner.
- Abby Barton was named to the Hockey East Academic All-Star Team.
- Myriam Croussette was named a Maine Scholar-Athlete Rising Star
- Myriam Croussette was named to the Hockey East Academic Honor Roll
- Jenna Ouellette, Maine Scholar-Athlete Award winner
- Jenna Ouellette was named to the Hockey East Academic Honor Roll.
- Dawn Sullivan was named a Maine Scholar-Athlete *Rising Star*
- Dawn Sullivan was named to the Hockey East Academic Honor Roll.
- Genevieve Turgeon was named Hockey East Honorable Mention.
- Genevieve Turgeon set a school record for saves in a season
- Genevieve Turgeon was named a Hockey East Distinguished Scholar.
