= 2006 4 Nations Cup =

Annual women's ice hockey tournament

Official logo

The 2006 4 Nations Cup, an annual women's ice hockey tournament, was held at the Kitchener Memorial Auditorium in Kitchener, Ontario, Canada, and took place from 7 to 11 November 2006.

== Results ==
7 November 2006

Sweden	8–3	Finland
Canada	3–0	United States

8 November 2006

United States	5–2	Finland
Canada	7–0	Sweden

10 November 2006

United States	7–0	Sweden
Canada	8–1	Finland

=== Final standings ===
Team	GP	W	L	T	OTL	PTS	PCT	GF	GA
Canada	4	4	0	0	0	8	1.000	23	3
United States	4	2	2	0	0	4	0.500	14	10
Sweden	4	2	2	0	0	4	0.500	11	19
Finland	4	0	4	0	0	0	0.000	8	24

== Finals ==
=== Bronze medal match ===
11 November 2006

Sweden	3–2	Finland

=== Gold medal match ===
11 November 2006

Canada	5–2	United States

== Statistics ==
=== Top scorers ===
#	Player	G	A	T
1	(Canada) Jayna Hefford	4	5	9
	(United States) Natalie Darwitz	3	6	9
	(United States) Krissy Wendell	3	6	9
4	(Canada) Caroline Ouellette	4	3	7
	(Canada) Jennifer Botterill	1	6	7
6	(Sweden) Maria Rooth	2	2	4
	(Finland) Saara Tuominen	2	2	4
	(Sweden) Pernilla Winberg	2	2	4
	(Canada) Meghan Agosta	1	3	4
	(Canada) Colleen Sostorics	1	3	4

=== Goalies ===
#	Player	GP	M	S	GA	SO	Avg.
1	(Canada) Shannon Szabados	2	120	37	1	1	0.50
2	(Canada) Kim St-Pierre	2	120	45	2	1	1.00
3	(United States) Shari Vogt	2	92	44	3	0	1.95
4	(United States) Chandra Gunn	3	147	80	6	1	2.44
5	(Sweden) Sara Grahn	2	120	85	9	0	4.50
6	(Sweden) Kim Martin	2	120	84	10	0	5.00
7	(Finland) Noora Räty	2	99	55	9	0	5.46
8	(Finland) Mira Kuisma	3	140	92	15	0	6.43

== See also ==
- 4 Nations Cup
