= Amber Bowman =

Canadian firefighter and ice hockey player (born 1985)

- Born: January 28, 1985 (age 41)
- Height: 5 ft 8 in (173 cm)
- Position: Defence
- Shot: Right
- Played for: Beatrice Aeros; Mississauga Chiefs; Brampton Thunder; Burlington Barracudas; Toronto Furies
- Playing career: 2007–2013

Amber Bowman (born January 28, 1985) is a Canadian firefighter and ice hockey player who has captured the world championships at the World Firefighter Challenge in 2012 and 2013. She captured gold in all four disciplines of the event: female individual, female tandem, coed tandem and relay events; it makes her the first female to have won the gold in all four categories and the first competitor (male or female) to have won consecutive golds in all four categories. As a rookie at the 2011 FireFit championships, she won world championships in the female individual and female tandem (with her tandem partner Jacqueline Rasenberg) combat challenges. This was the first time in the history of the competition that a female rookie won a world championship.

== Athletic career ==
=== Hockey ===
In minor hockey, Bowman was a member of the Aurora Panthers squad that won an International Silver Stick competition in 2001. For the 2002-03 season, she was a member of the Beatrice Jr. Aeros.

==== NCAA ====
Competing with the Ohio State Buckeyes women's ice hockey program, one of her teammates was future Olympic gold medalist Tessa Bonhomme. During the 2005–06 and 2006-07 seasons, Bowman served as co-captain. Of note, she was also a member of the 2005 WCHA All-Star Team that played versus the U.S. National Team. Bowman graduated with a degree in exercise science while earning over 100 career points with the Buckeyes. Her 100th career point came against the Minnesota State Mavericks.

==== CWHL ====
Bowman has also competed in the Canadian Women's Hockey League. During her CWHL career, she has competed for the Brampton Thunder, Burlington Barracudas and the Toronto Furies. With the Barracudas, she competed in the franchise's final CWHL season (2012–13). Her last season in the league was in 2012-13 as a competitor for the Furies. Along with Furies goaltender Erika Vanderveer, the duo auditioned for the first season of The Amazing Race Canada. As a side note, the two were roommates at Ohio State University.

=== Firefighter challenges ===
Bowman has participated in Canadian and international firefighter competitions. A firefighter for the Central York Fire Department, whose jurisdiction includes the municipalities of Aurora and Newmarket, Ontario (located north of Toronto), she was one of the first four women ever hired by the department (along with Anne Dinsmore, Melanie Linn and Kristy Patterson). At the 2012 ScottFireFit National Canadian Championships, Bowman broke a decade old record in the Obstacle Course by seven seconds as she finished with a time of 2:01.54. During the 2012 World Firefighting Challenge held in Myrtle Beach, South Carolina, Bowman won every competition that she competed in. In autumn 2013, Bowman defended all four of her titles at the 2013 world championships in Las Vegas, which was the site of the World Firefighter Combat Challenge. The four disciplines in which she emerged victorious included: female individual, female tandem, coed tandem and relay events. The inaugural United Arab Emirates (UAE) World Firefighter Challenge was held in April 2014 in Abu Dhabi and Bowman competed. It was the first firefighting competition held in the Middle East.

== Awards and honours ==
=== Hockey ===
- First Team All-WCHA (2005–06)
- WCHA All-Academic Team (2004–05, 2005–06)
- Academic All-Big Ten at-large selection (2004–05, 2005–06)
- OSU Scholar-Athlete (2003–04, 2004–05, 2005–06)

=== Firefighter challenges ===
- 2012 and 2013 Canadian Female Fire Fit Champion
- Canadian Firefit Female Record Holder - time 2:01
- Female Individual Combat Challenge World Champion 2011, 2012 and 2013
- Female Tandem Combat Challenge World Champion 2011, 2012 and 2013
- Co-Ed Tandem Combat Challenge World Champion 2011, 2012, 2013 (in the 2013 edition, she would help to set a New World Record)
- Female Relay Combat Challenge World Champion 2012, 2013
- 2014 UAE World Firefighter Challenge champion (Female Individual and Female Tandem)
