= 2005 Air Canada Cup =

Ice Hockey contest

Tournament details
- Host country: Germany
- Dates: 10 – 12 February 2005
- Teams: 4

Final positions
- Champions: Canada U22 (3rd title)
- Runners-up: Finland U20
- Third place: Switzerland

Tournament statistics
- Games played: 6

The 2005 Air Canada Cup was the third edition of the women's ice hockey tournament. It was held from February 10-12, 2005 in Duisburg, Germany. The Canadian U22 national team won the tournament for a third consecutive year, going undefeated over three games.

== Tournament ==
=== Results ===
Canada U22	8–3 (0-0, 5-0, 3-3)	Finland U20	Duisburg

Germany	0–3 (0-1, 0-2, 0-1)	Switzerland	Duisburg

Canada U22	10-1 (3-1, 3-0, 4-0)	Switzerland	Duisburg

Germany	4–2 (1-0, 1-2, 2-0)	Finland U20	Duisburg

Finland U20	7–3 (1-0, 1-1, 5-2)	Switzerland	Duisburg

Germany	0–13 (0-2, 0-5, 0-6)	Canada U22	Duisburg

=== Final table ===
Pos	Team	Pld	W	D	L	GF	GA	GD	Pts
1	Canada U22	3	3	0	0	31	4	+27	6
2	Finland U20	3	1	0	2	12	15	−3	2
3	Switzerland	3	1	0	2	7	17	−10	2
4	Germany	3	1	0	2	4	18	−14	2
