= Ohio State Buckeyes women's ice hockey =

College ice hockey team

- Current season
- University: Ohio State University
- Conference: WCHA
- Head coach: Nadine Muzerall; 11th season, 258–85–22 (.737)
- Arena: The Ohio State University Ice Rink; Columbus, Ohio
- Colors: Scarlet and gray

NCAA tournament champions
- 2022, 2024

NCAA tournament runner-up
- 2023, 2025, 2026

NCAA tournament Frozen Four
- 2018, 2021, 2022, 2023, 2024, 2025, 2026

NCAA tournament appearances
- 2018, 2020, 2021, 2022, 2023, 2024, 2025, 2026

Conference tournament champions
- 2020, 2022, 2026

Conference regular season champions
- 2023, 2024

Current uniform
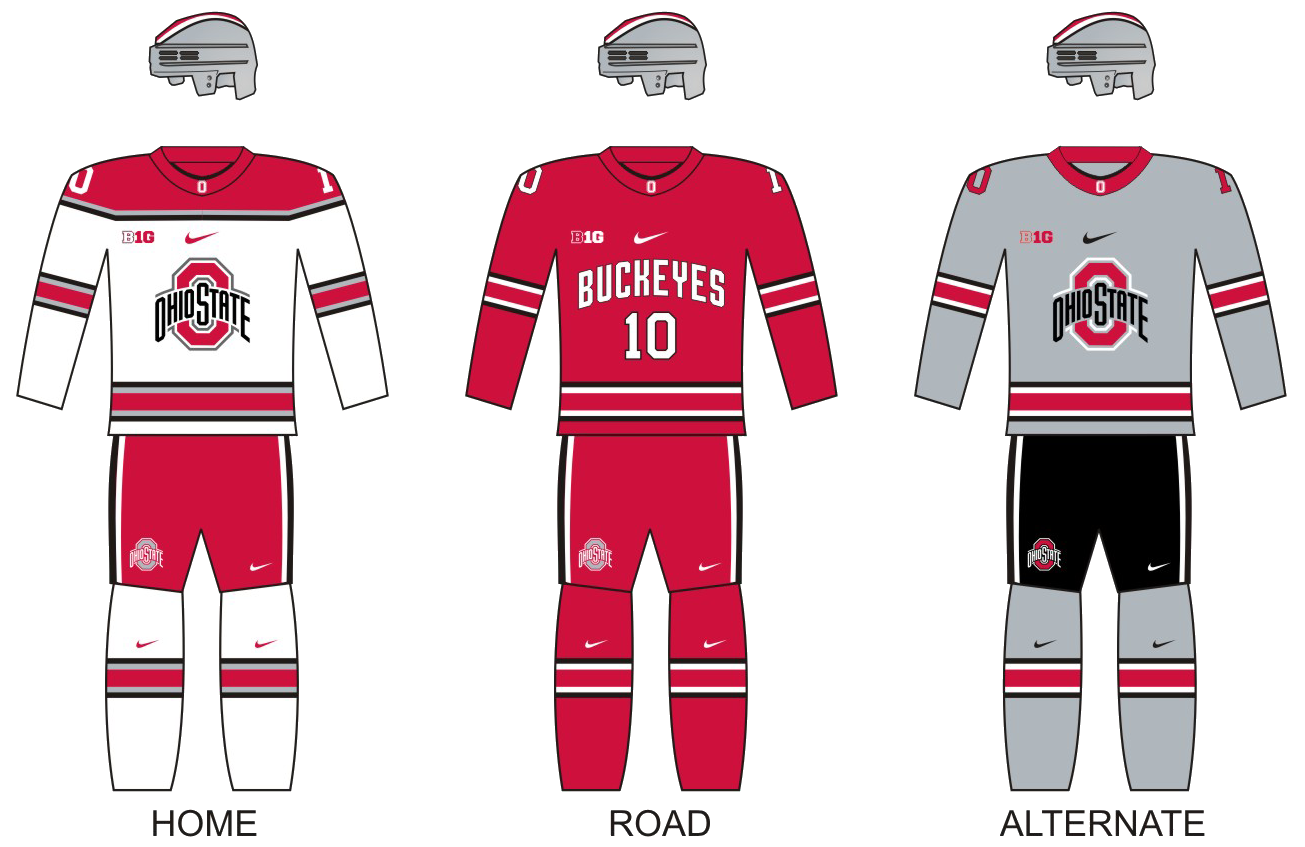

The Ohio State Buckeyes women's ice hockey team is who represents The Ohio State University in NCAA Division I competition in the Western Collegiate Hockey Association (WCHA) conference. The team plays in Columbus, Ohio, at The Ohio State Ice Rink which is on the Ohio State campus.

== History ==
The Buckeyes competed in the WCHA championship tournament in March 2001, defeating the St. Cloud State Huskies in the first round and No. 1 Minnesota Golden Gophers in the second round to advance to the championship game. The Buckeyes were defeated by the eventual national champion Minnesota Duluth Bulldogs. The Buckeyes had an 18–16–3 overall record, including 11–10–3 in the WCHA, and finished No. 8 in the national polls. They were 12–5–1 in their last 18 contests during the regular season and finished 7–1–0.

The 2001–02 season saw the Buckeyes defeat several nationally ranked teams, including the No. 3 University of New Hampshire Wildcats and the No. 4 St. Lawrence Saints, and tie the No. 6 Dartmouth Big Green. Five players received postseason honors, including Jeni Creary, who was named the WCHA Rookie of the Year and All-WCHA First Team selection after leading the nation in scoring for the first half of the season, and Emma Terho née Laaksonen, who earned JOFA/AHCA Second Team All-America accolades and All-WCHA Second Team honors despite missing ten games while representing her native Finland at the 2002 Winter Olympics.

In the 2006–07 season, the Buckeyes reached the 20-win mark for the first time in program history, finishing the season with a 20–13–4 record. They set a program record for the longest unbeaten streak at ten games (9–0–1, Oct. 28 – Dec. 8), posted a team-best 30 points in the WCHA with a 13–11–4 conference record and had a 12–5–3 home record while finishing fourth in the league standings. They swept the Minnesota State Mavericks in the best-of-three league playoff tournament and advanced to the WCHA semifinals against eventual national champion Wisconsin. The Buckeyes completed the season as the 10th-ranked team in the USCHO.com and USA Hockey national polls.

Head coach Jackie Barto recorded her 200th career win on November 24, 2007, with a 4–1 victory against St. Cloud State at the OSU Ice Rink.

In 2008, Tessa Bonhomme was Ohio State's first two-time Top 10 finalist for the Patty Kazmaier Memorial Award, given to the top Division I women's hockey student-athlete in the nation. She was also the team captain of the 2007–08 Buckeyes. Bonhomme was also named WCHA Player of the Year and WCHA Defensive Player of the Year, the first Buckeye to receive either award.

Jody Heywood was a two-time finalist for the Hockey Humanitarian Award in 2007 and 2008, the first Buckeye on either men's or women's teams to be a finalist for the award.

In 2009, Liana Bonanno became the program's first ESPN The Magazine Academic All-America at-large selection, earning a place on the third team.

Natalie Spooner scored 21 goals in 2009, leading the team and earning the program's No. 7 spot for single-season goals. She had a six-game point streak from Nov. 15 to Jan. 9, including a five-game goal streak to tie for the second-longest program history. On December 12, 2008, she set the program record for goals in a game with four in a 6–5 win at Minnesota State, including a natural hat trick in the second period in a span of 1:56.

The 2009–10 season opening game was Barto's 500th career game as coach.

Laura McIntosh was recognized as the WCHA offensive player of the week for October 19, 2011. She had a record-breaking weekend in the Buckeyes' conference series sweep of St. Cloud State, during which she was credited with four points, seven shots on goal and a +5 plus/minus rating. On October 14, she scored her first season goal and assisted on a Hokey Langan goal. The assist made McIntosh Ohio State's all-time leader in career points against WCHA opponents, surpassing Jana Harrigan's 110 league points in 2006. McIntosh scored two points the following day, assisting on Ally Tarr's shorthanded game-winning goal and scoring the Buckeyes' third goal.

Three players reached milestones in a January 27, 2012, defeat of the North Dakota Fighting Sioux. Spooner scored two goals, McIntosh had three assists, and Langan had two assists. McIntosh's assists moved her into a tie at the top of the program's all-time career points list. Her 160 career points are now tied with Harrigan's. Spooner's goals were on the power-play, bringing her season total to seven. Spooner reached the 150-career point mark with the goals, good for third all-time in program history. Langan's assists helped her reach the 100-point milestone, only the eighth Buckeyes player to reach the mark.

The Buckeyes suffered a period of coaching instability, having three head coaches in three seasons. Nate Handrahan resigned in 2015 following reports of sexual harassment, and replacement coach Jenny Schmidgall-Potter resigned in 2016 after repeated NCAA violations. Ohio State athletic director Gene Smith hired then-Minnesota assistant coach Nadine Muzerall. Muzerall was an assistant coach at Minnesota from 2011 to 2016, which won four national championships in that span. Before Muzerall's hiring, the team had never qualified for the NCAA tournament.

Muzerall quickly turned the Buckeyes around. Following a 14-18-5 season in 2017, they received an at large bid for the 2018 NCAA Women's Ice Hockey Tournament. They beat the Boston College Eagles 2–0 in the quarterfinals, making it to their first ever NCAA Women's Frozen Four. They lost in the semi-finals to Clarkson.

On March 8, 2020, the Buckeyes defeated the Wisconsin Badgers 1–0 in overtime to earn the program's first WCHA championship. They automatically qualified for the 2020 NCAA Women's Ice Hockey Tournament, which was canceled due to the COVID-19 pandemic. They received an at large bid for the 2021 NCAA Women's Ice Hockey Tournament.

For the 2020/21 season, the Buckeyes again advanced to the WCHA Championship game, where they fell to the Wisconsin Badgers in overtime. In the National Tournament, they beat Boston College in the quarterfinals 3-1, but once again fell to Wisconsin in the Frozen Four.

During the 2021/22 season, the Buckeyes reached the program's first 1 seed after defeating Minnesota 3–2 in overtime for the WCHA Championship, in the process earning both an automatic bid to the 2022 NCAA Women's Ice Hockey Tournament and a home playoff game. The Buckeyes defeated the 7 seed Quinnipiac 4–3 in double overtime, sending them to the program's 3rd Frozen Four. There, they beat #6 Yale 2–1, and won the program's first National Title two days later, beating Minnesota Duluth 3–2. Defenseman Sophie Jaques finished the season with 21 goals and 38 assists for 59 points total and was a Patty Kazmaier Award finalist. Jaques and head coach Nadine Muzerall became the USCHO's Player of the Year and Coach of the Year, respectively.

In the 2022/23 season, the Buckeyes won their first WCHA regular season title on the back of a 28-4-2 regular season record. They lost to Minnesota in the WCHA Championship game but still received the #1 overall seed in the NCAA tournament, their second in a row. In the NCAA tournament, the Buckeyes beat Quinnipiac 5-2 in the quarterfinal and played in their third-straight Women's Frozen Four against #5 seed Northeastern, which they defeated 3-0 to advance to their second-straight final. In the final, Ohio State lost 1-0 to Wisconsin, giving Wisconsin its 7th title. Sophie Jaques won the Patty Kazmaier Award, given annually to the best player in Women's Hockey. She was Ohio State's first player to win that award and the second defenseman to win the award.

== Coaches ==
Barto served as the program's first head coach, leading the team from 1999 to 2011 and finishing with a record of 178–209–42 (.464). During her first ten years as head coach, the program received 14 All-WCHA honors. She served on the NCAA Women's Ice Hockey Championship Committee from 2000 to 2006 and is a member of the American Women's Hockey Coaches Association. She retired in April 2011 after 12 seasons at Ohio State.

In May 2011, Nate Handrahan became the program's second head coach. He coached the team for four seasons, finishing with a record of 67–64–15 (.507). He resigned on March 9, 2015, amid a sexual harassment investigation.

On April 12, 2015, Jenny Schmidgall-Potter was named the program's third head coach. She finished her single season with a record of 10–25–1 (.288).

In September 2016, Nadine Muzerall was named the program's fourth head coach.

== Current roster ==
As of September 16, 2025.

No.	Nat.	Player	Class	Pos	Height	DoB	Hometown	Previous team
1	(United States)	Genny Klein	Sophomore	G	5' 6" (1.68 m)	2005-12-20	Apple Valley, Minnesota	Shattuck-St. Mary's
4	(Canada)	Sara Swiderski	Senior	D	5' 9" (1.75 m)	2004-11-11	Langley, British Columbia	Clarkson University
7	(United States)	Emma Peschel (C)	Senior	D	5' 10" (1.78 m)	2004-01-20	Edina, Minnesota	Benilde-St. Margaret's
8	(Sweden)	Hilda Svensson	Freshman	F	5' 6" (1.68 m)	2006-08-24	Oskarshamn, Sweden	Sanda High School
9	(Sweden)	Jenna Raunio	Freshman	D	5' 9" (1.75 m)	2006-09-24	Huskvarna, Sweden	Sanda High School
11	(United States)	Kaia Malachino	Junior	F	5' 8" (1.73 m)	2004-11-02	Brighton, Michigan	Colgate University
12	(United States)	Grace McCoshen	Sophomore	D	5' 6" (1.68 m)	2005-10-08	Northfield, Minnesota	Northfield High School
14	(Sweden)	Mira Jungåker	Sophomore	D	5' 7" (1.7 m)	2005-07-22	Jönköping, Sweden	HV71
15	(United States)	Macy Rasmussen	Freshman	F	5' 4" (1.63 m)	2007-05-17	Orono, Minnesota	Orono High School
16	(United States)	Joy Dunne (A)	Junior	F	5' 11" (1.8 m)	2005-06-13	O'Fallon, Missouri	The Fulton School
17	(Canada)	Jocelyn Amos (C)	Junior	F	5' 7" (1.7 m)	2005-02-24	Ailsa Craig, Ontario	Medway High School
18	(Canada)	Maxine Cimoroni	Freshman	F	5' 9" (1.75 m)	2007-02-27	Toronto, Ontario	Bishop Strachan School
19	(United States)	Jordyn Petrie	Sophomore	F	5' 9" (1.75 m)	2006-01-10	Lincoln, Nebraska	Shattuck-St. Mary's
20	(United States)	Maria Roth	Sophomore	D	5' 9" (1.75 m)	2004-10-12	Dubuque, Iowa	Shattuck-St. Mary's
21	(Finland)	Sanni Vanhanen	Freshman	F	5' 6" (1.68 m)	2005-07-01	Tampere, Finland	Mäkelänrinne High School
22	(United States)	Sloane Matthews (A)	Freshman	F	5' 6" (1.68 m)	2004-07-18	Plymouth, Minnesota	Wayzata High School
23	(Canada)	Leah Wicks	Freshman	D	5' 5" (1.65 m)	2007-08-19	St. John's, Newfoundland and Labrador	Shattuck-St. Mary's
27	(Canada)	Jordan Baxter	Junior	F	5' 7" (1.7 m)	2005-03-14	Coquitlam, British Columbia	North Delta Secondary
28	(Canada)	Brooke Disher	Senior	D	5' 8" (1.73 m)	2004-07-14	Fort St. John, British Columbia	Boston University
29	(United States)	Kassidy Carmichael	Freshman	F	5' 7" (1.7 m)	2006-10-14	Westford, Massachusetts	North American Hockey Academy
30	(United States)	Taylor Kressin	Freshman	G	5' 7" (1.7 m)	2007-01-17	Moorhead, Minnesota	Moorhead High School
35	(Canada)	Hailey MacLeod	Senior	G	6' 0" (1.83 m)	2004-06-12	Abbotsford, British Columbia	Minnesota Duluth

== Buckeyes in professional hockey ==
= CWHL All-Star Team	= NWHL All-Star	= Clarkson Cup Champion	= Isobel Cup Champion	= Walter Cup Champion

Player	Position	Team(s)	League(s)	Years	Clarkson Cup	Isobel Cup	Walter Cup
Cayla Barnes	Defense	Montreal Victoire	PWHL	2024–2025			
Cayla Barnes	Defense	Seattle Torrent	PWHL	2025–present			
Lauren Bernard	Defense	Toronto Sceptres	PWHL	2024–2025			
Lauren Bernard	Defense	New York Sirens	PWHL	2025–present			
Hannah Bilka	Forwards	Boston Fleet	PWHL	2024–2025			
Hannah Bilka	Forwards	Seattle Torrent	PWHL	2025–present			
Madison Bizal	Defense	Montreal Victoire	PWHL	2023–2024			
Madison Bizal	Defense	Minnesota Frost	PWHL	2025-2026			
Tessa Bonhomme	Defense	Toronto Furies	CWHL	2010–2015	1 (2014)		
Amber Bowman	Defense	Mississauga Chiefs	CWHL	2007–2013			
Amber Bowman	Defense	Brampton Thunder	CWHL	2007–2013			
Amber Bowman	Defense	Burlington Barracudas	CWHL	2007–2013			
Amber Bowman	Defense	Toronto Furies	CWHL	2007–2013			
Riley Brengman	Defense	Boston Fleet	PWHL	2025-2026			
Jenna Buglioni	Forward	Seattle Torrent	PWHL	2025-2026			
Clair DeGeorge	Forward	Minnesota Frost	PWHL	2023–2024			1 (2024)
Clair DeGeorge	Forward	Montreal Victoire	PWHL	2024–2025			
Clair DeGeorge	Forward	Toronto Sceptres	PWHL	2025–present			
Jennifer Gardiner	Forward	Montreal Victoire	PWHL	2024–2025			
Jennifer Gardiner	Forward	PWHL Vancouver	PWHL	2025–present			
Hadley Hartmetz	Defense	Boston Fleet	PWHL	2024–present			
Sophie Jaques	Defense	Boston Fleet	PWHL	2023–2024			
Sophie Jaques	Defense	Minnesota Frost	PWHL	2024–2025			2 (2024, 2025)
Sophie Jaques	Defense	Vancouver Goldeneyes	PWHL	2025–present			
Raygan Kirk	Goaltender	Toronto Sceptres	PWHL	2024–present			
Emma Laaksonen	Defense	Kiekko-Espoo	NSML	1996–2000, 2004–2007, 2008–2019			
Emma Laaksonen	Defense	SKIF Nizhny Novgorod	RWHL	2007–2008			
Paetyn Levis	Forward	New York Sirens	PWHL	2023–present			
Emma Maltais	Forward	Toronto Sceptres	PWHL	2023–present			
Stephanie Markowski	Defense	Ottawa Charge	PWHL	2024–present			
Laura McIntosh	Forward	Markham Thunder	CWHL	2012–2013, 2015–2018	1 (2018)		
Jincy Roese	Defense	Ottawa Charge	PWHL	2023–2025			
Jincy Roese	Defense	New York Sirens	PWHL	2025–present			
Gabby Rosenthal	Forward	New York Sirens	PWHL	2024–2025			
Gabby Rosenthal	Forward	Vancouver Goldeneyes	PWHL	2025–present			
Kassidy Sauvé	Goaltender	New England	PWHPA	2019–2022			
Kassidy Sauvé	Goaltender	Calgary	PWHPA	2019–2022			
Kassidy Sauvé	Goaltender	Toronto	PWHPA	2019–2022			
Kassidy Sauvé	Goaltender	HPK	NSML	2021–2024			
Liz Schepers	Forward	Minnesota Frost	PWHL	2023–2025			2 (2024, 2025)
Liz Schepers	Forward	Boston Fleet	PWHL	2025–present			
Natalie Spooner	Forward	Toronto Furies	CWHL	2012–2019	1 (2014)		
Natalie Spooner	Forward	Toronto	PWHPA	2020–2021			
Natalie Spooner	Forward	Calgary	PWHPA	2022–2023			
Natalie Spooner	Forward	Toronto Sceptres	PWHL	2023–present			
Amanda Thiele	Goaltender	Boston Fleet	PWHL	2025-present			
Minttu Tuominen	Defense	Kiekko-Espoo	NSML	2006–2009, 2013–2024			
Minttu Tuominen	Defense	Linköping HC	SDHL	2016–2017			
Minttu Tuominen	Defense	KRS Vanke Rays	ZhHL	2020–2022			
Erika Vanderveer	Goaltender	Ravens Salzburg	EWHL	2007–2008			
Erika Vanderveer	Goaltender	Brampton Thunder	CWHL	2008–2014			
Erika Vanderveer	Goaltender	Boston Blades	CWHL	2008–2014			
Erika Vanderveer	Goaltender	Toronto Furies	CWHL	2008–2014			
Maddi Wheeler	Forward	New York Sirens	PWHL	2025-2026			
Kiara Zanon	Forward	Toronto Sceptres	PWHL	2025-present			

== International ==
On the international level, Barto was an assistant coach in 1998 at the USA Hockey Women's Festival in Lake Placid, N.Y., where she was one of four head coaches in 1999. She was an assistant coach for the 2003 U.S. Women's Under-22 Select Team. She was a member of the selection committee for the 2006 Winter Olympic U.S. National Women's Hockey team. She was head coach of the U.S. Women's National and Select teams in 2007–08 and coached the U.S. Women's Select Team to a silver medal at the Four Nations Cup in November 2007. She was named head coach of the U.S. Women's Under-22 Team for 2008–09. She led the U.S. Women's National Team to the gold medal at the 2008 IIHF World Women's Championship in Harbin, China.

Spooner was a member of the Canadian National Women's Team for the 2008 4 Nations Cup. She competed for the 2009-10 Canada Under 22 Hockey team. On January 8, 2010, she scored 4:59 in overtime to give Canada's National Women's Under-22 Team a 4–3 victory over Sweden and send Canada to the gold medal game at the 2010 MLP Cup, where Canada won the gold medal.

=== Olympians ===
Year	Country	Player	Result
1998	Finland	Emma Laaksonen	Bronze
2002	Finland	Emma Laaksonen	4th place
2006	Finland	Emma Laaksonen	4th place
2010	Canada	Tessa Bonhomme	Gold
2010	Finland	Emma Laaksonen	Bronze
2010	Finland	Minttu Tuominen	Bronze
2010	United States	Lisa Chesson	Silver
2014	Canada	Natalie Spooner	Gold
2014	Finland	Emma Laaksonen	5th place
2014	Finland	Minttu Tuominen	5th place
2018	Canada	Natalie Spooner	Silver
2018	Finland	Sara Säkkinen	Bronze
2018	Finland	Minttu Tuominen	Bronze
2018	Switzerland	Andrea Brändli	5th place
2018	United States	Cayla Barnes	Gold
2022	Canada	Emma Maltais	Gold
2022	Canada	Natalie Spooner	Gold
2022	Finland	Minttu Tuominen	Bronze
2022	Sweden	Sofie Lundin	8th place
2022	Switzerland	Andrea Brändli	4th place
2022	United States	Cayla Barnes	Silver
2022	United States	Jincy Dunne	Silver
2026	Canada	Sophie Jaques	Silver
2026	Canada	Jenn Gardiner	Silver
2026	Canada	Emma Maltais	Silver
2026	Canada	Natalie Spooner	Silver
2026	Finland	Sanni Vanhanen	6th place
2026	Sweden	Mira Jungåker	4th place
2026	Sweden	Jenna Raunio	4th place
2026	Sweden	Hilda Svensson	4th place
2026	Switzerland	Andrea Brändli	Bronze
2026	United States	Cayla Barnes	Gold
2026	United States	Hannah Bilka	Gold
2026	United States	Joy Dunne	Gold

== Individual awards and honors ==
- Tessa Bonhomme, Top 10 finalist for the Patty Kazmaier Memorial Award (2007)
- Tessa Bonhomme, Top 10 finalist for the Patty Kazmaier Memorial Award (2008)
- Tessa Bonhomme, WCHA Player of the Year
- Tessa Bonhomme, WCHA Defensive Player of the Year
- Tessa Bonhomme, Third Team All-USCHO (2006–07)
- Tessa Bonhomme, First Team All-WCHA (2006–07)
- Tessa Bonhomme, WCHA All-Tournament Team (2006–07)
- Tessa Bonhomme, Buckeyes Most Valuable Defensive Player (2004–05)
- Tessa Bonhomme, Buckeyes Most Valuable Freshman (2003–04)
- Liana Bonanno, ESPN The Magazine Academic All-America at-large selection, earning a place on the third team
- Jeni Creary, Top 10 finalist for the Patty Kazmaier Memorial Award (2002)
- Jeni Creary, WCHA Rookie of the Year (2002)
- Jeni Creary, All-WCHA First Team selection (2002)
- Rachel Davis, 2010 Frozen Four Skills Competition participant
- Jincy Dunne, WCHA Rookie of the Month, January 2017
- Joy Dunne, Julie Chu Women's National Rookie of the Year Award (2024)
- Jana Harrigan, AHCA Second Team All-America pick (2006)
- Jana Harrigan, Top 10 finalist for the Patty Kazmaier Memorial Award (2006)
- Jody Heywood, finalist, Hockey Humanitarian Award in 2007
- Jody Heywood, finalist, Hockey Humanitarian Award in 2008
- Sophie Jaques, 2022 WCHA Defensive Player of the Year
- Sophie Jaques, 2023 WCHA Defensive Player of the Year
- Sophie Jaques, 2023 WCHA Player of the Year
- Sophie Jaques, Hockey Commissioner's Association National Player of the Month for March 2022
- Sophie Jaques, Top 3 Finalist, 2022 Patty Kazmaier Award
- Sophie Jaques, 2023 Patty Kazmaier Award
- Emma Laaksonen WCHA Student-Athlete of the Year (2004)
- Emma Laaksonen Top 10 finalist for the Patty Kazmaier Memorial Award (2002)
- Emma Laaksonen, JOFA/AHCA Second Team All-America accolades (2002)
- Emma Laaksonen, All-WCHA Second Team honors (2002)
- Hokey Langan, 2010 Patty Kazmaier Award nominee
- Nadine Muzerall, 2022 WCHA Coach of the Year
- Corinne Rosen, WCHA all-tournament team (2001)
- Kassidy Sauvé, 2014–15 WCHA All-Rookie Team
- Natalie Spooner, 2010 and 2011 Patty Kazmaier Award nominee
- April Stojak, WCHA All-Tournament team (2001)
- Hilda Svensson, Julie Chu Women's National Rookie of the Year Award (2026)

=== All-America recognition ===
- Tessa Bonhomme, AHCA All-America honors (2008)
- Tessa Bonhomme, AHCA Second Team All-America pick (2007)
- Jincy Roese, 2017–18 Second Team All-America
- Jincy Roese, 2019-20 CCM Hockey Women's Division I All-American: First Team
- Jennifer Gardiner, 2022–23 AHCA Second Team All-America
- Sophie Jaques, 2021–22 AHCA First Team All-America, 2022–23 AHCA First Team All-America
- Emma Laaksonen, 2001–02 AHCA Second Team All-America
- Emma Maltais, 2019-20 CCM Hockey Women's Division I All-American: Second Team
- Kassidy Sauvé, 2016–17 Second Team All-America
- Natalie Spooner, 2011–12 CCM Hockey Women's Division I All-American: Second Team

=== Frozen Four ===
- Paetyn Levis, 2022 NCAA Frozen Four Most Outstanding Player
- Raygan Kirk, 2024 NCAA Frozen Four Most Outstanding Player

== See also ==
- Ohio State Buckeyes men's ice hockey
- List of college women's ice hockey coaches with 250 wins
