= Cailey Hutchison =

American ice hockey forward (born 1997)

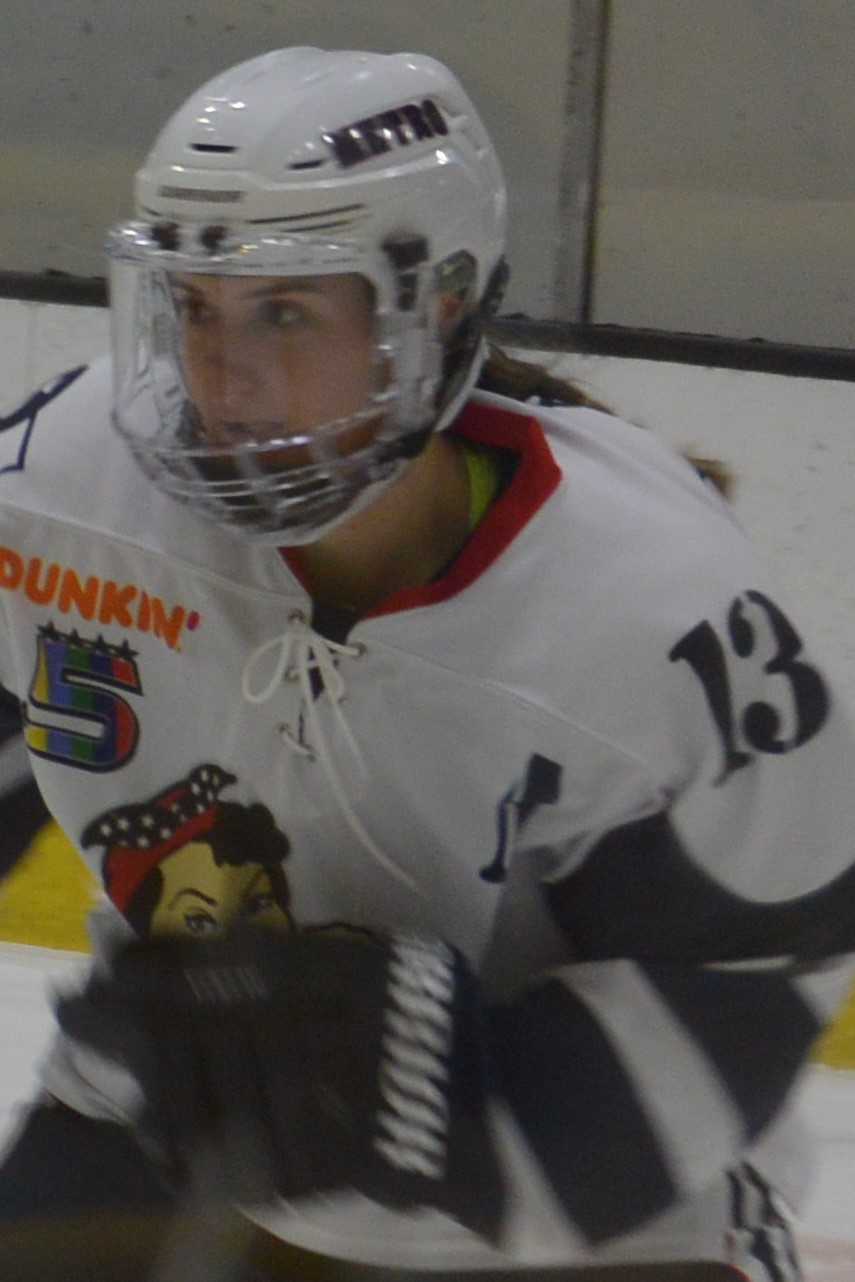
- Cailey Hutchison playing for the Metro Riveters 10-29-19
- Born: February 11, 1997 (age 29) Hicksville, New York, United States
- Height: 163 cm (5 ft 4 in)
- Position: Forward
- PHF team: Connecticut Whale
- Played for: University of Maine; Metropolitan Riveters
- Playing career: 2019–present

Cailey Hutchison is an American ice hockey forward, currently playing with the Connecticut Whale in the Premier Hockey Federation.

== Career ==
Across four years at the University of Maine, Hutchison scored 20 points in 127 games. She was drafted 21st overall by the Metropolitan Riveters in the 2018 NWHL Draft. After her graduation, she would sign her first professional contract with the team. In her first season, she scored 11 points in 24 games, serving as an assistant captain for the team. She was named to the 2020 NWHL All-Star Game as a replacement for Brooke Stacey.

During the 2021 off-season Hutchison, an unrestricted free agent, signed with the Connecticut Whale.

== Personal life ==
Her brother, Nick Hutchison has played for the Adirondack Thunder in the ECHL. She has a degree in nursing.

== Career statistics ==
			Regular season					Playoffs
Season	Team	League	GP	G	A	Pts	PIM	GP	G	A	Pts	PIM
2019-20	Metropolitan Riveters	NWHL	24	3	8	11	28	1	0	0	0	4
2020-21	Metropolitan Riveters	NWHL	3	1	0	1	2
2021-22	Connecticut Whale	PHF	19	1	6	7	12	1	0	0	0	0
NWHL totals			24	3	8	11	28	1	0	0	0	4
