= Western Mustangs women's ice hockey =

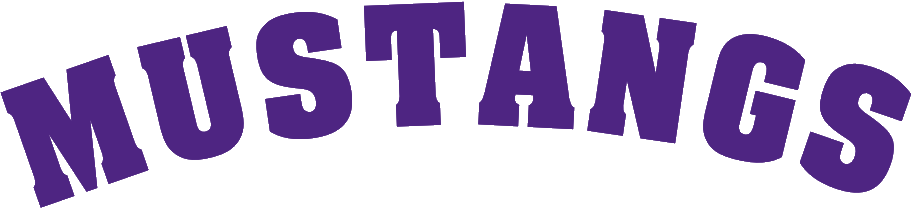
- University: University of Western Ontario
- Conference: OUA; West Division
- Head coach: Brittany Howard; 1st season
- Assistant coaches: Molly Crossman, Kassie Roache, Sofia Malnorova, Nick Dahan
- Arena: Thompson Arena; London, Ontario
- Colors: Purple and White
- Fight song: "Western"
- Mascot: J.W. the Mustang

U Sports tournament champions
- 2014–15

Conference tournament champions
- 2014–15, 2017–18

The Western Mustangs women's ice hockey team represents the University of Western Ontario Western Mustangs and competes in the Ontario University Athletics conference, which participates nationally in the U Sports athletic program. The Mustangs play at Thompson Arena in London, Ontario.

The women's hockey team has won two Ontario University Athletics women's ice hockey championships (2014–15 and 2017–18) and one U Sports championship (2014–15).

The current coach of the team is Brittany Howard, joined the Mustangs in 2025-26 season.

== History ==
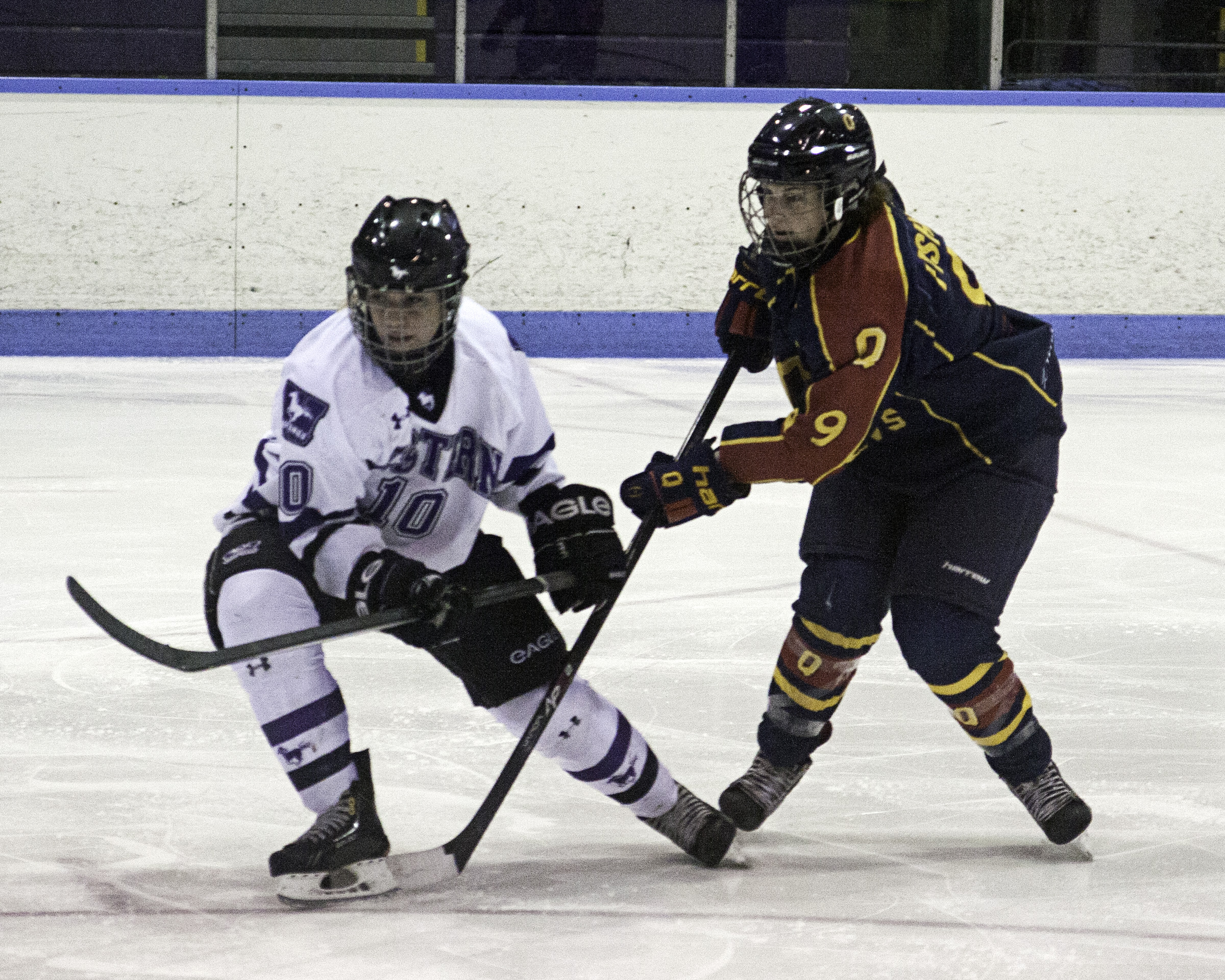
Western Mustang #10 (white) Marlowe Pecora during a game at Thompson Arena November 17, 2013

On October 21, 2010, the Mustangs played the Chinese national women's hockey team. The game ended in a 2–2 tie as Katie Dillon notched both goals. From January 29, 2011 to February 6, 2011, Katie Dillon led the OUA with a four-game point scoring streak in which she registered four goals. On February 11, 2011, Mustangs captain Ellie Seedhouse scores a goal in her final CIS game as Western fell to the Brock Badgers by a 5–1 mark.

Two Mustangs rookies were named to the 2012 OUA All-Rookie team. Stacey Scott led all rookies with 27 points, which ranked eighth overall among all OUA skaters. Katelyn Gosling accumulated 13 points, which finished second among rookie defenders. Her 13 points helped rank her sixth overall among all OUA blueliners in scoring, respectively.

At the end of the 2011–12 season, Tawn Rellinger and Katie Dillon, both fourth-year players, decided to cut off their hair and donate it to Locks of Love.

The 2014–15 season represented numerous milestones for the Mustangs. Finishing in first place in the OUA standings, the Mustangs would capture their first-ever McCaw Cup championship, followed by a Golden Path Trophy triumph, awarded to the U Sports National Champions. Additionally, the roster produced a trio of OUA First-Team All-Stars, a First-Team All-Canadian.

=== Team Success ===
- National Champions 2015
- National Silver Medalists 2018
- OUA Champions 2015, 2018
- OUA Silver medalists 2012, 2013, 2016

The Mustangs have been Ontario University Athletics (OUA) Champions in 2015 & 2018, USports Champions in 2015, Silver Medalists in 2018 and nationally ranked in the top 10 of Canadian Interuniversity Sports (U SPORTS).

== Regular Season by season results ==
Season	Coach	GP	W	OTW	L	OTL	T	GF	GA	PTS	Finished
1937–1938	Miss Weston										
1938–1939											
1959–1960											
1960–1961	Andy Bakogeorge										
1961–1962	Kerr Ferguson										
1962–1963											
1963–1964											
1964–1965											
1965–1966											
1968–1969											
1969–1970											
1970–1971	Brian Cobb / John Cobb										
1971–1972											
1972–1973											
1973–1974											
1974–1975											
1975–1976											
1976–1977											
2000–2001	Warren Schantz	22	1	0	19	0	2	41	103	4	
2001–2002	Warren Schantz	20	5	0	14	0	0	39	96	10	
2002–2003	Warren Schantz	22	2	0	18	0	2	29	77	6	
2003–2004	Paul Cook										
2004–2005	Paul Cook	22	2	0	11	1	8	27	60	13	
2005–2006	Paul Cook	24	7	0	12	1	4	55	55	19	
2006–2007	Paul Cook	24	11	0	11	1	1	42	53	24	
2007–2008	Paul Cook	27	9	0	13	0	5	62	67	23	
2008–2009	Paul Cook	27	8	0	13	6	0	49	68	22	
2009–2010	Paul Cook	27	6	4	14	3	0	66	87	28	8th
2010–2011	Chris Higgins	27	3	3	20	1	0	61	93	14	9th
2011–2012	Chris Higgins	26	12	1	13	0	0	72	72	26	5th
2012–2013	Chris Higgins	26	13	3	5	2	0	83	52	42	4th
2013–2014	Chris Higgins	24	8	3	9	1	0	73	51	30	6th
2014–2015	Chris Higgins / Dave Barrett	24	15	3	2	1	0	64	33	43	1st
2015–2016	Dave Barrett	24	15	0	8	1	0	62	36	45	4th
2016–2017	Kelly Paton	24	11	1	10	2	0	69	56	39	5th
2017–2018	Kelly Paton	24	15	2	6	1	0	61	41	50	2nd
2018–2019	Candice Moxley	24	14	1	7	2	0	62	41	48	2nd
2019–2020	Candice Moxley	24	10	2	11	1	0	48	51	35	9th

== Leading scorers ==
Year	Player	GP	G	A	PTS	PIM	OUA rank
2007–08	Whitney Weisshaar	27	11	9	20		
2008–09	Ellie Seedhouse	27	11	6	17		
2009–10	Ellie Seedhouse	27	15	17	32		
2010–11	Katie Dillon	27	11	7	18		
2016–17	Lyndsay Kirkham	24	19	12	31	20	2nd
2017–18	April Clark	24	12	10	22	14	8th
2018–19	April Clark	24	20	13	33	18	1st
2019–20	April Clark	24	9	13	22	14	4th

== Winter Universiade: International University Sports Federation (FISU) ==
The Winter Universiade is a biennial international multi-sport event. Players are selected across the U SPORTS’s 33 Women’s Varsity Hockey teams to represent Canada.

Event	Players	Result
2011 Winter Universiade FISU (Erzurum, Turkey)	Ellie Seedhouse	Gold
2013 Winter Universiade FISU (Trentino, Italy)	Kelly Campbell, Katelyn Gosling (invited but could not attend due to injury)	Gold
2015 Winter Universiade FISU (Granada, Spain)	Katelyn Gosling	Silver
2017 Winter Universiade FISU (Almaty, Khazahstan)	Katelyn Gosling	Silver

== Awards and honours ==
- Carmen Lasis, 2018 U SPORTS Women’s Hockey Championship Tournament All-Star Team

=== Team Awards ===
==== Most Valuable Player ====
- 2019–20: April Clark

=== University Awards ===
- 2019 Western Mustangs Female Athlete of the Year: April Clark

==== FWP Jones Award ====
Presented to the Western female student athlete who has made the greatest contribution to athletics within the University

Player	Year
Joanne Smith	1966
Janet Mackay	1973
April Clark	2020

=== OUA Awards ===
- 2015 OUA Team of the Year

==== OUA Most Valuable Player ====
Player	Year
April Clark	2018/19

==== OUA Forward of the Year ====
Player	Year
April Clark	2018/19

==== OUA 1st Team All-Stars ====
Player	Position	Years
Kelly Campbell	Goalie	2012/13, 2014/15
Katelyn Gosling	Defence	2012/13, 2013/14, 2014/15, 2015/16
Lindsay Kirkham	Forward	2016/17
Elle Seedhouse	Forward	2009/10
Kendra Broad	Forward	2014/15
April Clark	Forward	2018/19

==== OUA 2nd Team All-Stars ====
Player	Position	Years
Danielle LeBer	Goalie	2005/06
Carla Hunt	Defence	2004/05
Brianna Iazzolino	Defence	2014/15, 20016/17
Emma Pearson	Defence	2017/18
April Clark	Forward	2017/18

==== OUA All-Rookie Team ====
Player	Position	Year
Kryshandra Green	Forward	2012/13
Katelyn Gosling	Defence	2011/12
Stacey Scott	Forward	2011/12

=== U Sports Awards ===
==== Marion Hilliard Award (Outstanding Student-Athlete) ====
Player	Year
Veronica Johnston	2009/10

==== USPORTS 1st Team All-Stars ====
Player	Position	Years
Kelly Campbell	Goalie	2012/13, 2014/15
Katelyn Gosling	Defence	2012/13, 2015/16

==== USPORTS 2nd Team All-Stars ====
Player	Position	Years
Katelyn Gosling	Defence	2014/15

== Mustangs in professional hockey ==
= CWHL All-Star	= NWHL All-Star	= Clarkson Cup Champion	= Isobel Cup Champion

Player	Position	Team(s)	League(s)	Years	Titles
Brittany Clapham	Forward	Neuchâtel Hockey Academy Dames	SWHL	1	
Kendra Broad	Forward	Sundsvall/Timrå; Neuchâtel Hockey Academy Dames; Connecticut Whale; Aisulu Almaty	SDHL; EWHL; NWHL; EWHL	5	
Katelyn Gosling	Defence	Calgary Inferno; Dream Gap Tour	CWHL; PWHPA		2019 Clarkson Cup
Sydney Kidd	Forward/Defence	Connecticut Whale; Toronto Furies; Dream Gap Tour	NWHL; CWHL; PWHPA		
Anthea Lasis	Defence	ZSC Lions Frauen	SWHL		
Carly Rolph		EV Bomo Thun; Melbourne Ice	SWHL A (W); AWIHL	2	
Stacey Scott	Forward	Sundsvall/Timrå; KMH Budapest; MAC Budapest	SDHL; EWHL; EWHL	5	
Ellie Seedhouse	Forward	Brampton/Markham Thunder	CWHL	4	2018 Clarkson Cup

- Kelly Campbell was selected by the Brampton Thunder in the 14th round of the 2016 CWHL Draft but never appeared with the team.
