= 2014 Clarkson Cup =

2014 ice hockey championship series

	1	Total
Toronto Furies	1*	1
Boston Blades	0	0
- Location(s): Markham, Ontario
- Dates: March 21, 2009

The 2014 Clarkson Cup is a women's ice hockey tournament that was contested in Markham, Ontario to determine the champion of the Canadian Women's Hockey League from March 19 to March 22, 2014. The Toronto Furies defeated the Boston Blades by a 1-0 tally in overtime to claim their first title. The tournament was played at Markham Centennial Centre. With the victory, Natalie Spooner became the first woman in hockey history to claim the gold medal in the Winter Games and the Clarkson Cup in the same year.

== Round robin ==
- March 21: In Toronto's shootout victory against Montreal, Natalie Spooner scored the winning goal of the shootout. With Boston prevailing by a 6-2 tally against Calgary later that day, Hilary Knight scored a tournament-high four goals in one game.

Date	Teams	Score
March 19	Calgary vs. Toronto	Toronto, 3-2
March 19	Boston vs. Montreal	Boston, 1-0
March 20	Boston vs. Toronto	Boston, 2-1
March 20	Montreal vs. Calgary	Montreal, 5-4
March 21	Montreal vs. Toronto	Toronto, 2-1 (SO)
March 21	Boston vs. Calgary	Boston, 6-2

=== Standings ===
Team	W	L	OTL	GF	GA
Boston	3	0	0	9	4
Toronto	2	1	0	6	5
Montreal	1	1	1	6	7
Calgary	0	3	0	8	14

== Scoring leaders ==
Player	Team	GP	G	A	PTS	PIM
Kate Buesser	Boston	4	3	4	7	4
Hilary Knight	Boston	4	5	1	6	0
Kelli Stack	Boston	4	1	5	6	0
Natalie Spooner	Toronto	4	2	3	5	2
Taryn Peacock	Calgary	3	1	4	5	2
Danielle Stone	Calgary	3	3	1	4	6
Julie Paetsch	Calgary	3	2	2	4	2

== Furies championship roster ==
Number	Name
1	Sami Jo Small
2	Julie Allen
3	Jessica Vella
4	Michelle Bonello A
6	Meagan Aarts
8	Katie Wilson
9	Kristy Zamora A
10	Jordanna Peroff
12	Martine Garland
14	Alyssa Baldin
18	Lexie Hoffmeyer
19	Britni Smith C
21	Kelly Zamora
23	Shannon Moulson
24	Natalie Spooner
25	Tessa Bonhomme
27	Carolyne Prevost
28	Brooke Beazer
35	Christina Kessler
44	Kori Cheverie
77	Holly Carrie-Mattimoe
91	Jenelle Kohanchuk

== Awards and honours ==
- Most Valuable Player, Christina Kessler, Toronto Furies
- First Star of the Game, Britni Smith, Toronto Furies
- Second Star of the Game, Christina Kessler, Toronto Furies
- Third Star of the Game, Brittany Ott, Boston Blades
