= Canada–United States women's national ice hockey rivalry =

International ice hockey rivalry

Canada-United States women's ice hockey rivalry
- Canada United States
- Sport: Ice hockey
- First meeting: CAN 2–1 USA; April 21, 1987
- Latest meeting: USA 6–2 CAN; November 16, 2026

Statistics
- Total meetings: 198
- Largest victory: CAN 8–0 USA; April 26, 1992
- Longest win streak: USA W8 (October 20, 2001 – January 8, 2002, April 13, 2025 – February 19, 2026)
- Current win streak: USA W2

Canada and the United States have faced each other in the gold medal game of seven of eight Olympics, 24 of 25 IIHF Women's World Championships and 21 of 23 4 Nations Cups since the beginning of international play. Only a few of Canada's and the U.S.'s losses have been to teams outside their rivalry.

Canada currently leads with 107 wins against 90 American wins.

== History ==
After a U.S. victory over Canada at the 1998 Nagano Olympics, Canada won the next three gold medal games over the U.S. in 2002, 2010, and 2014 (the exception being 2006 where Canada defeated Sweden for gold and U.S. defeated Finland for bronze). In 2018, the U.S. ended a 20-year gold medal drought and denied Canada's bid for a fifth straight gold medal by defeating Canada in a shootout. Canada once again claimed gold over the U.S. at the 2022 Olympics, while U.S. won gold over Canada in 2026 Olympics in overtime.

However, at the World Championships, Canada won the first 8 straight gold medals from 1990 to 2004. From 2005 to 2019 the U.S. has dominated winning 9 of the 11 World Championships, defeating Canada eight times (the exception being 2019 where the U.S. won gold defeating Finland, who upset Canada in their semi-final match). Since 2021, Canada and the United States have each won three World Championships

At the 4 Nations Cup, Canada and the U.S. have faced each other in every gold medal game (except 2001 when the U.S. withdrew due to the September 11 attacks and 2013 where Canada won gold defeating Finland and the U.S. won bronze defeating Sweden). Between 1996 and 2010, Canada won 12 of 15 and from 2011 to 2018, the U.S. won 6 of the 8. The tournament has not been played since the 2018 edition.

The longest Gold medal streak is tied at 9. The Canadian streak lasting from 1998 to 2002, was broken by U.S.'s Gold at the 2003 4 Nations Cup. The American streak lasting from 2015 to 2019, was broken by Canada's Gold at the 2021 World Championship. The longest win streak, eight games, by the Americans was broken by Canada's win in the gold medal game of the 2002 Olympics.

== Game results ==
Canada victories	USA victories

No.	Date	Location	Winner	Score	Event/Ref
1	April 21, 1987	North York, ON	Canada	2–1	World Women's Hockey Tournament, preliminary round
2	March 25, 1990	Ottawa, ON	Canada	5–2	1990 IIHF Women's World Championship, gold medal game
3	April 26, 1992	Tampere, Finland	Canada	8–0	1992 IIHF Women's World Championship, gold medal game
4	April 17, 1994	Lake Placid, NY	Canada	6–3	1994 IIHF Women's World Championship, gold medal game
5	April 6, 1995	San Jose, CA	USA	5–2	1995 Women's Pacific Rim Championship, preliminary round
6	April 8, 1995	San Jose, CA	Canada	2–1^{GWS}	1995 Women's Pacific Rim Championship, gold medal game
7	April 3, 1996	Richmond, BC	Canada	3–2	1996 Women's Pacific Rim Championship, preliminary round
8	April 6, 1996	Richmond, BC	Canada	4–1	1996 Women's Pacific Rim Championship, gold medal game
9	October 21, 1996	Cornwall, ON	Canada	4–3	1996 3 Nations Cup, preliminary round
10	October 24, 1996	Smiths Falls, ON	USA	2–1^{OT}	1996 3 Nations Cup, preliminary round
11	October 27, 1996	Ottawa, ON	Canada	1–0	1996 3 Nations Cup, gold medal game
12	April 6, 1997	Kitchener, ON	Canada	4–3^{OT}	1997 IIHF Women's World Championship, gold medal game
13	October 25, 1997	Salt Lake City, UT	USA	5–4^{GWS}	Exhibition game
14	November 7, 1997	Bathurst, NB	Canada	3–2	Exhibition game
15	November 8, 1997	Saint John, NB	Canada	4–1	Exhibition game
16	November 10, 1997	Kitchener, ON	USA	3–2	Exhibition game
17	December 4, 1997	Minneapolis, MN	USA	3–1	Exhibition game
18	December 6, 1997	Winnipeg, MB	Canada	5–4	Exhibition game
19	December 14, 1997	Lake Placid, NY	Canada	3–2	1997 3 Nations Cup, preliminary round
20	December 17, 1997	Burlington, VT	Canada	5–4	1997 3 Nations Cup, preliminary round
21	December 20, 1997	Lake Placid, NY	USA	3–0	1997 3 Nations Cup, gold medal game
22	January 16, 1998	Vancouver, BC	Canada	2–1	1998 NHL All-Star Weekend, exhibition game
23	January 20, 1998	San Jose, CA	USA	4–3^{OT}	Exhibition game
24	January 26, 1998	Calgary, AB	USA	3–1	Telus Olympic Celebration, exhibition game
25	January 28, 1998	Colorado Springs, CO	Canada	4–2	Exhibition game
26	February 14, 1998	Nagano, Japan	USA	7–4	1998 Winter Olympics, preliminary round
27	February 17, 1998	Nagano, Japan	USA	3–1	1998 Winter Olympics, gold medal game
28	December 10, 1998	Kuortane, Finland	Canada	2–1	1998 3 Nations Cup, preliminary round
29	December 14, 1998	Kuortane, Finland	Canada	4–3^{GWS}	1998 3 Nations Cup, gold medal game
30	March 1, 1999	Brampton, ON	Canada	6–1	TSN Challenge
31	April 9, 1999	Espoo, Finland	Canada	3–1	1999 IIHF Women's World Championship, gold medal game
32	November 28, 1999	Sherbrooke, QC	Canada	3–1	1999 3 Nations Cup, preliminary round
33	December 2, 1999	Montreal, QC	Canada	5–4^{OT}	1999 3 Nations Cup, preliminary round
34	December 5, 1999	Montreal, QC	Canada	3–2^{GWS}	1999 3 Nations Cup, gold medal game
35	February 2, 2000	Buffalo, NY	USA	4–1	TSN Challenge, pre–challenge game
36	February 4, 2000	Toronto, ON	Canada	6–0	TSN Challenge
37	April 9, 2000	Mississauga, ON	Canada	3–2^{OT}	2000 IIHF Women's World Championship, gold medal game
38	November 8, 2000	Provo, UT	USA	4–1	2000 4 Nations Cup, preliminary round
39	November 11, 2000	Provo, UT	Canada	2–0	2000 4 Nations Cup, gold medal game
40	January 31, 2001	Red Deer, AB	USA	5–4	TSN Challenge, game one
41	February 2, 2001	Denver, CO	USA	3–2	TSN Challenge, game two
42	April 8, 2001	Minneapolis, MN	Canada	3–2	2001 IIHF Women's World Championship, gold medal game
43	October 20, 2001	Salt Lake City, UT	USA	4–1	Exhibition game
44	October 23, 2001	San Jose, CA	USA	4–1	Exhibition game
45	November 27, 2001	Ottawa, ON	USA	5–2	TSN Challenge, game one
46	November 28, 2001	Montreal, QC	USA	4–3	TSN Challenge, game two
47	November 30, 2001	Hamilton, ON	USA	1–0	TSN Challenge, game three
48	January 5, 2002	Chicago, IL	USA	3–1	Exhibition game
49	January 6, 2002	Detroit, MI	USA	7–3	Exhibition game
50	January 8, 2002	Vancouver, BC	USA	3–2	Final Faceoff, exhibition game
51	February 21, 2002	West Valley City, UT	Canada	3–2	2002 Winter Olympics, gold medal game
52	November 6, 2002	Kitchener, ON	Canada	7–0	2002 4 Nations Cup, preliminary round
53	November 10, 2002	Kitchener, ON	Canada	4–2	2002 4 Nations Cup, gold medal game
54	November 6, 2003	Skövde, Sweden	USA	2–0	2003 4 Nations Cup, preliminary round
55	November 9, 2003	Skövde, Sweden	USA	2–1^{GWS}	2003 4 Nations Cup, gold medal game
56	April 3, 2004	Halifax, NS	USA	3–1	2004 IIHF Women's World Championship, preliminary game
57	April 6, 2004	Halifax, NS	Canada	2–0	2004 IIHF Women's World Championship, gold medal game
58	November 11, 2004	Burlington, VT	Tie	1–1	2004 4 Nations Cup, preliminary round
59	November 14, 2004	Lake Placid, NY	Canada	2–1	2004 4 Nations Cup, gold medal game
60	April 9, 2005	Linköping, Sweden	USA	1–0^{GWS}	2005 IIHF Women's World Championship, gold medal game
61	September 1, 2005	Hämeenlinna, Finland	Canada	4–0	2005 4 Nations Cup, preliminary round
62	September 4, 2005	Hämeenlinna, Finland	Canada	2–1	2005 4 Nations Cup, gold medal game
63	October 6, 2005	Regina, SK	Canada	3–2	CAN–USA Exhibition, game one
64	October 8, 2005	Saskatoon, SK	Canada	6–0	CAN–USA Exhibition, game two
65	November 10, 2005	Turin, Italy	Canada	5–0	Torino Ice Tournament, preliminary round
66	November 12, 2005	Turin, Italy	Canada	7–0	Torino Ice Tournament, gold medal game
67	November 27, 2005	Columbus, OH	USA	2–1^{GWS}	Exhibition game
68	December 1, 2005	Chicago, IL	Canada	3–1	Exhibition game
69	December 30, 2005	Saint Paul, MN	Canada	4–2	Exhibition game
70	January 1, 2006	Winnipeg, MB	USA	5–3	Exhibition game
71	November 7, 2006	Kitchener, ON	Canada	3–0	2006 4 Nations Cup, preliminary round
72	November 11, 2006	Kitchener, ON	Canada	5–2	2006 4 Nations Cup, gold medal game
73	April 7, 2007	Winnipeg, MB	Canada	5–4^{GWS}	2007 IIHF Women's World Championship, preliminary round
74	April 10, 2007	Winnipeg, MB	Canada	5–1	2007 IIHF Women's World Championship, gold medal game
75	November 8, 2007	Leksand, Sweden	Canada	6–3	2007 4 Nations Cup, preliminary round
76	November 11, 2007	Leksand, Sweden	Canada	2–0	2007 4 Nations Cup, gold medal game
77	April 10, 2008	Harbin, China	USA	4–2	2008 IIHF Women's World Championship, preliminary round
78	April 12, 2008	Harbin, China	USA	4–3	2008 IIHF Women's World Championship, gold medal game
79	November 6, 2008	Lake Placid, NY	Canada	4–2	2008 4 Nations Cup, preliminary round
80	November 9, 2008	Lake Placid, NY	USA	3–2^{GWS}	2008 4 Nations Cup, gold medal game
81	April 10, 2009	Hämeenlinna, Finland	Canada	2–1	2009 IIHF Women's World Championship, preliminary round
82	April 12, 2009	Hämeenlinna, Finland	USA	4–1	2009 IIHF Women's World Championship, gold medal game
83	September 3, 2009	Vancouver, BC	USA	4–2	Hockey Canada Cup, preliminary round
84	September 6, 2009	Vancouver, BC	USA	2–1	Hockey Canada Cup, gold medal game
85	October 5, 2009	Victoria, BC	Canada	3–1	Series vs USA, game one
86	October 16, 2009	Spokane, WA	Canada	5–2	Series vs USA, game two
87	November 6, 2009	Tikkurila, Finland	USA	3–2	2009 4 Nations Cup, preliminary round
88	November 7, 2009	Tikkurila, Finland	Canada	5–1	2009 4 Nations Cup, gold medal game
89	December 12, 2009	Denver, CO	Canada	4–2	Series vs USA, game three
90	December 15, 2009	Calgary, AB	Canada	6–2	Series vs USA, game four
91	December 30, 2009	Saint Paul, MN	Canada	2–1	Series vs USA, game five
92	January 1, 2010	Ottawa, ON	Canada	3–2^{GWS}	Series vs USA, game six
93	February 25, 2010	Vancouver, BC	Canada	2–0	2010 Winter Olympics, gold medal game
94	November 9, 2010	St. John's, NL	USA	3–2^{GWS}	2010 4 Nations Cup, preliminary round
95	November 13, 2010	St. John's, NL	Canada	3–2^{OT}	2010 4 Nations Cup, gold medal game
96	April 25, 2011	Zurich, Switzerland	USA	3–2^{OT}	2011 IIHF Women's World Championship, gold medal game
97	August 28, 2011	Vierumäki, Finland	USA	4–0	IIHF 12 Nations Tournament, round robin
98	August 29, 2011	Vierumäki, Finland	Canada	4–3^{GWS}	IIHF 12 Nations Tournament, exhibition game
99	November 10, 2011	Nyköping, Sweden	Canada	3–1	2011 4 Nations Cup, preliminary round
100	November 13, 2011	Nyköping, Sweden	USA	4–3^{GWS}	2011 4 Nations Cup, gold medal game
101	April 7, 2012	Burlington, VT	USA	9–2	2012 IIHF Women's World Championship, preliminary round
102	April 14, 2012	Burlington, VT	Canada	5–4^{OT}	2012 IIHF Women's World Championship, gold medal game
103	November 7, 2012	Tikkurila, Finland	Canada	3–1	2012 4 Nations Cup, preliminary round
104	November 10, 2012	Tikkurila, Finland	USA	3–0	2012 4 Nations Cup, gold medal game
105	April 2, 2013	Ottawa, ON	Canada	3–2^{GWS}	2013 IIHF Women's World Championship, preliminary round
106	April 9, 2013	Ottawa, ON	USA	3–2	2013 IIHF Women's World Championship, gold medal game
107	November 6, 2013	Lake Placid, NY	Canada	4–2	2013 4 Nations Cup, preliminary round
108	October 12, 2013	Burlington, VT	Canada	3–2	NWT Series, game one
109	October 17, 2013	Boisbriand, QC	Canada	6–3	NWT Series, game two
110	December 12, 2013	Calgary, AB	USA	5–1	NWT Series, game three
111	December 20, 2013	Grand Forks, ND	USA	4–1	NWT Series, game four
112	December 28, 2013	Saint Paul, MN	USA	3–2^{GWS}	NWT Series, game five
113	December 30, 2013	Toronto, ON	USA	3–2	NWT Series, game six
114	February 12, 2014	Sochi, Russia	Canada	3–2	2014 Winter Olympics, preliminary round
115	February 20, 2014	Sochi, Russia	Canada	3–2^{OT}	2014 Winter Olympics, gold medal game
116	November 5, 2014	Kamloops, BC	Canada	3–2	2014 4 Nations Cup, preliminary round
117	November 8, 2014	Kamloops, BC	Canada	3–2^{OT}	2014 4 Nations Cup, gold medal game
118	March 28, 2015	Malmö, Sweden	USA	4–2	2015 IIHF Women's World Championship, preliminary round
119	April 4, 2015	Malmö, Sweden	USA	7–5	2015 IIHF Women's World Championship, gold medal game
120	November 5, 2015	Kovland, Sweden	USA	3–0	2015 4 Nations Cup, preliminary round
121	November 8, 2015	Sundsvall, Sweden	USA	3–2^{OT}	2015 4 Nations Cup, gold medal game
122	March 28, 2016	Kamloops, BC	USA	3–1	2016 IIHF Women's World Championship, preliminary round
123	April 4, 2016	Kamloops, BC	USA	1–0^{OT}	2016 IIHF Women's World Championship, gold medal game
124	November 4, 2016	Vierumäki, Finland	Canada	3–2	2016 4 Nations Cup, preliminary round
125	November 5, 2016	Järvenpää, Finland	USA	5–3	2016 4 Nations Cup, gold medal game
126	December 17, 2016	Plymouth Township, MI	Canada	5–3	2016 NWT December Series, game one
127	December 19, 2016	Sarnia, ON	Canada	3–2^{OT}	2016 NWT December Series, game two
128	March 31, 2017	Plymouth Township, MI	USA	2–0	2017 IIHF Women's World Championship, preliminary round
129	April 7, 2017	Plymouth Township, MI	USA	3–2^{OT}	2017 IIHF Women's World Championship, gold medal game
130	October 22, 2017	Quebec City, QC	USA	5–2	2017–18 NWT Series, game one
131	October 25, 2017	Boston, MA	Canada	5–1	2017–18 NWT Series, game two
132	November 8, 2017	Tampa, FL	USA	4–2	2017 4 Nations Cup, preliminary round
133	November 12, 2017	Tampa, FL	USA	5–1	2017 4 Nations Cup, gold medal game
134	December 3, 2017	Saint Paul, MN	Canada	2–1^{OT}	2017–18 NWT Series, game three
135	December 5, 2017	Winnipeg, MB	Canada	2–0	2017–18 NWT Series, game four
136	December 15, 2017	San Jose, CA	Canada	3–1	2017–18 NWT Series, game five
137	December 17, 2017	Edmonton, AB	Canada	2–1^{OT}	2017–18 NWT Series, game six
138	February 13, 2018	Gangneung, South Korea	Canada	2–1	2018 Winter Olympics, preliminary round
139	February 22, 2018	Gangneung, South Korea	USA	3–2^{GWS}	2018 Winter Olympics, gold medal game
140	November 7, 2018	Saskatoon, SK	USA	2–1	2018 4 Nations Cup, preliminary round
141	November 10, 2018	Saskatoon, SK	USA	5–1	2018 4 Nations Cup, gold medal game
142	February 12, 2019	London, ON	USA	1–0	2018–19 Rivalry Series, game one
143	February 14, 2019	Toronto, ON	Canada	4–3	2018–19 Rivalry Series, game two
144	February 17, 2019	Detroit, MI	Canada	2–0	2018–19 Rivalry Series, game three
145	April 6, 2019	Espoo, Finland	USA	3–2	2019 IIHF Women's World Championship, preliminary round
146	November 8, 2019	Cranberry Township, PA	Canada	4–1	2019 NWT Series, game one
147	November 10, 2019	Cranberry Township, PA	Canada	5–3	2019 NWT Series, game two
148	December 14, 2019	Hartford, CT	USA	4–1	2019–20 Rivalry Series, game one
149	December 17, 2019	Moncton, NB	USA	2–1	2019–20 Rivalry Series, game two
150	February 3, 2020	Victoria, BC	Canada	3–2^{OT}	2019–20 Rivalry Series, game three
151	February 5, 2020	Vancouver, BC	USA	3–1	2019–20 Rivalry Series, game four
152	February 8, 2020	Anaheim, CA	USA	4–3^{OT}	2019–20 Rivalry Series, game five
153	August 26, 2021	Calgary, AB	Canada	5–1	2021 IIHF Women's World Championship, preliminary round
154	August 31, 2021	Calgary, AB	Canada	3–2^{OT}	2021 IIHF Women's World Championship, gold medal game
155	October 22, 2021	Allentown, PA	Canada	3–1	2021–22 Rivalry Series, game one
156	October 25, 2021	Hartford, CT	Canada	3–2	2021–22 Rivalry Series, game two
157	November 21, 2021	Kingston, ON	USA	3–2^{OT}	2021–22 Rivalry Series, game three
158	November 23, 2021	Ottawa, ON	USA	2–0	2021–22 Rivalry Series, game four
159	December 15, 2021	St. Louis, MO	Canada	2–1^{OT}	2021–22 Rivalry Series, game five
160	December 17, 2021	St. Louis, MO	Canada	3–2^{OT}	2021–22 Rivalry Series, game six
161	February 8, 2022	Beijing, China	Canada	4–2	2022 Winter Olympics, preliminary round
162	February 17, 2022	Beijing, China	Canada	3–2	2022 Winter Olympics, gold medal game
163	August 30, 2022	Herning, Denmark	USA	5–2	2022 IIHF Women's World Championship, preliminary round
164	September 4, 2022	Herning, Denmark	Canada	2–1	2022 IIHF Women's World Championship, gold medal game
165	November 15, 2022	Kelowna, BC	USA	4–3^{GWS}	2022–23 Rivalry Series, game one
166	November 17, 2022	Kamloops, BC	USA	2–1	2022–23 Rivalry Series, game two
167	November 20, 2022	Seattle, WA	USA	4–2	2022–23 Rivalry Series, game three
168	December 15, 2022	Henderson, NV	Canada	3–2	2022–23 Rivalry Series, game four
169	December 19, 2022	Los Angeles, CA	Canada	3–2^{OT}	2022–23 Rivalry Series, game five
170	February 20, 2023	Trois-Rivières, QC	Canada	5–1	2022–23 Rivalry Series, game six
171	February 22, 2023	Laval, QC	Canada	5–0	2022–23 Rivalry Series, game seven
172	April 10, 2023	Brampton, ON	Canada	4–3^{GWS}	2023 IIHF Women's World Championship, preliminary round
173	April 16, 2023	Brampton, ON	USA	6–3	2023 IIHF Women's World Championship, gold medal game
174	November 8, 2023	Tempe, AZ	USA	3–1	2023–24 Rivalry Series, game one
175	November 11, 2023	Los Angeles, CA	USA	5–2	2023–24 Rivalry Series, game two
176	December 14, 2023	Kitchener, ON	USA	3–2^{OT}	2023–24 Rivalry Series, game three
177	December 16, 2023	Sarnia, ON	Canada	3–2^{GWS}	2023–24 Rivalry Series, game four
178	February 7, 2024	Saskatoon, SK	Canada	4–2	2023–24 Rivalry Series, game five
179	February 9, 2024	Regina, SK	Canada	3–0	2023–24 Rivalry Series, game six
180	February 11, 2024	Saint Paul, MN	Canada	6–1	2023–24 Rivalry Series, game seven
181	April 8, 2024	Utica, NY	USA	1–0^{OT}	2024 IIHF Women's World Championship, preliminary round
182	April 14, 2024	Utica, NY	Canada	6–5^{OT}	2024 IIHF Women's World Championship, gold medal game
183	November 6, 2024	San Jose, CA	USA	7–2	2024–25 Rivalry Series, game one
184	November 8, 2024	West Valley City, UT	Canada	5–4^{GWS}	2024–25 Rivalry Series, game two
185	November 10, 2024	Boise, ID	Canada	4–1	2024–25 Rivalry Series, game four
186	February 6, 2025	Halifax, NS	USA	2–1^{GWS}	2024–25 Rivalry Series, game four
187	February 8, 2025	Summerside, PE	Canada	3–1	2024–25 Rivalry Series, game five
188	April 13, 2025	České Budějovice, Czechia	USA	2–1	2025 IIHF Women's World Championship, preliminary round
189	April 20, 2025	České Budějovice, Czechia	USA	4–3^{OT}	2025 IIHF Women's World Championship, gold medal game
190	November 6, 2025	Cleveland, OH	USA	4–1	2025–26 Rivalry Series, game one
191	November 8, 2025	Buffalo, NY	USA	6–1	2025–26 Rivalry Series, game two
192	December 10, 2025	Edmonton, AB	USA	10–4	2025–26 Rivalry Series, game three
193	December 13, 2025	Edmonton, AB	USA	4–1	2025–26 Rivalry Series, game four
194	February 10, 2026	Milan, Italy	USA	5–0	2026 Winter Olympics, preliminary round
195	February 19, 2026	Milan, Italy	USA	2–1^{OT}	2026 Winter Olympics, gold medal game
196	October 28, 2026	Windsor, Ontario	Canada	5–3	2026 IIHF Women's World Championship Pre-Tournament, Game 1
197	October 30, 2026	Plymouth, Michigan	USA	4–0	2026 IIHF Women's World Championship Pre-Tournament, Game 2
198	November 16, 2026	Herning, Denmark	USA	6–2	2026 IIHF Women's World Championship, gold medal game
Series: Canada leads 107–90–1

=== Head to head record ===
As of November 16, 2026

Wins by team
	Canada	USA	Ties
Regulation	81	67	1
Overtime	16	12	1
Shootout	10	11	1

== Results of tournaments ==
Year	Tournament	Canadian Results	U.S. Result	Other Team	Host
1987	Worlds	Gold	Bronze	Ontario — Silver	Canada (North York/Toronto)
1990	IIHF	Gold	Silver		Canada (Ottawa)
1992	IIHF	Gold	Silver		Finland (Tampere)
1994	IIHF	Gold	Silver		United States (Lake Placid)
1995	Pacific Rim	Gold	Silver		United States (San Jose)
1996	Pacific Rim	Gold	Silver		Canada (Richmond)
1996	Nations Cup	Gold	Silver		Canada (Ottawa)
1997	IIHF	Gold	Silver		Canada (Kitchener)
1997	Nations Cup	Silver	Gold		United States (Lake Placid)
1998	Olympics	Silver	Gold		Japan (Nagano)
1998	Nations Cup	Gold	Silver		Finland (Kuortane)
1999	IIHF	Gold	Silver		Finland (Espoo/Vantaa)
1999	Nations Cup	Gold	Silver		Canada (Montréal)
2000	IIHF	Gold	Silver		Canada (Mississauga)
2000	Nations Cup	Gold	Silver		United States (Provo)
2001	IIHF	Gold	Silver		United States (Minneapolis)
2001	Nations Cup	Gold	Did Not Participate	Finland — Silver	Finland (various locations)
2002	Olympics	Gold	Silver		United States (Salt Lake City/West Valley City)
2002	Nations Cup	Gold	Silver		Canada (Kitchener)
2003	IIHF	Cancelled due to SARS outbreak in China			China (Beijing)
2003	Nations Cup	Silver	Gold		Sweden (Skövde)
2004	IIHF	Gold	Silver		Canada (Halifax/Dartmouth)
2004	Nations Cup	Gold	Silver		United States (Burlington)
2005	IIHF	Silver	Gold		Sweden (Linköping/Norrköping)
2005	Nations Cup	Gold	Silver		Finland (Hämeenlinna)
2006	Olympics	Gold	Bronze	Sweden — Silver	Italy (Turin)
2006	Nations Cup	Gold	Silver		Canada (Kitchener)
2007	IIHF	Gold	Silver		Canada (Winnipeg/Selkirk)
2007	Nations Cup	Gold	Silver		Sweden (Leksand)
2008	IIHF	Silver	Gold		China (Harbin)
2008	Nations Cup	Silver	Gold		Sweden (Leksand)
2009	IIHF	Silver	Gold		Finland (Hämeenlinna)
2009	Hockey Canada Cup	Silver	Gold		Canada (Vancouver)
2009	Nations Cup	Gold	Silver		Finland (Tikkurila)
2010	Olympics	Gold	Silver		Canada (Vancouver)
2010	Nations Cup	Gold	Silver		Canada (St. John's)
2011	IIHF	Silver	Gold		Switzerland (Zürich/Winterthur)
2011	Nations Cup	Silver	Gold		Sweden (Nyköping)
2012	IIHF	Gold	Silver		United States (Burlington)
2012	Nations Cup	Silver	Gold		Finland (Tikkurila)
2013	IIHF	Silver	Gold		Canada (Ottawa)
2013	Nations Cup	Gold	Bronze	Finland — Silver	United States (Lake Placid)
2014	Olympics	Gold	Silver		Russia (Sochi)
2014	Nations Cup	Gold	Silver		Canada (Kamloops)
2015	IIHF	Silver	Gold		Sweden (Malmö)
2015	Nations Cup	Silver	Gold		Sweden (Kovland)
2016	IIHF	Silver	Gold		Canada (Kamloops)
2016	Nations Cup	Silver	Gold		Finland (Järvenpää)
2017	IIHF	Silver	Gold		United States (Plymouth)
2017	Nations Cup	Silver	Gold		United States (Tampa)
2018	Olympics	Silver	Gold		South Korea (Gangneung)
2018	Nations Cup	Silver	Gold		Canada (Saskatoon)
2019	IIHF	Bronze	Gold	Finland — Silver	Finland (Espoo)
2019	Nations Cup	Cancelled due to contract disputes between Swedish Ice Hockey Association and Swedish Women's Team			Sweden (Luleå)
2020	IIHF	Cancelled due to COVID-19 pandemic			Canada (Halifax/Truro)
2020	Nations Cup	Not scheduled due to COVID-19 pandemic			Finland / Sweden
2021	IIHF	Gold	Silver		Canada (Calgary)
2022	Olympics	Gold	Silver		China (Beijing)
2022	IIHF	Gold	Silver		Denmark (Herning/Frederikshavn)
2023	IIHF	Silver	Gold		Canada (Brampton)
2024	IIHF	Gold	Silver		United States (Utica)
2025	IIHF	Silver	Gold		Czechia (České Budějovice)
2026	Olympics	Silver	Gold		Italy (Milan)
2026	IIHF	Silver	Gold		Denmark (Herning/TBA)

=== Medal tables ===
==== Overall ====
Accurate as of 2026 IIHF Women's World Championship.

Rank	Nation	Gold	Silver	Bronze	Total
1	Canada	35	24	1	60
2	United States	25	31	3	59
Totals (2 entries)		60	55	4	119

==== Winter Olympics ====
Accurate as of 2026 Winter Olympics.

Rank	Nation	Gold	Silver	Bronze	Total
1	Canada	5	3	0	8
2	United States	3	4	1	8
Totals (2 entries)		8	7	1	16

==== IIHF Women's World Championship ====
Accurate as of 2026 IIHF Women's World Championship.

Rank	Nation	Gold	Silver	Bronze	Total
1	Canada	13	11	1	25
2	United States	12	13	0	25
Totals (2 entries)		25	24	1	50

==== Four Nations Cup ====
Accurate as of 2018 4 Nations Cup.

Rank	Nation	Gold	Silver	Bronze	Total
1	Canada	14	9	0	23
2	United States	9	12	1	22
Totals (2 entries)		23	21	1	45
