= Natalie Darwitz =

American ice hockey player and executive (born 1983)

- Hockey Hall of Fame, 2024
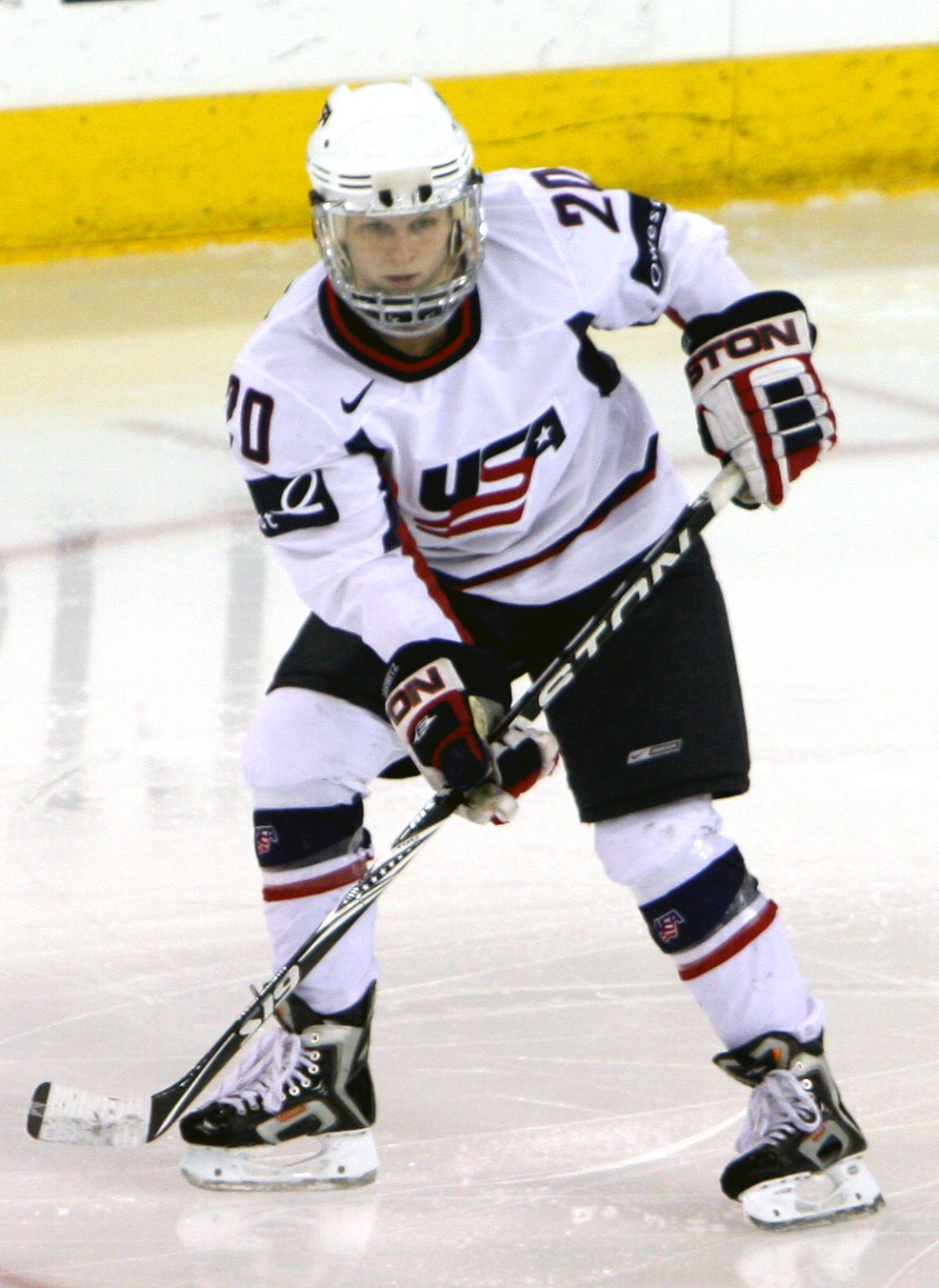
- Darwitz with the US national team in 2010
- Born: October 13, 1983 (age 43) Saint Paul, Minnesota, U.S.
- Height: 5 ft 3 in (160 cm)
- Weight: 135 lb (61 kg; 9 st 9 lb)
- Position: Forward
- Shot: Right
- Played for: University of Minnesota; Minnesota Whitecaps
- Coached for: Hamline University; University of Minnesota
- National team: United States
- Playing career: 1998–2010
- Coaching career: 2007–2023
- Website: Official website
Medal record
Representing United States
Women's ice hockey
Olympic Games
Silver medal – second place	2002 Salt Lake City	Tournament
Silver medal – second place	2010 Vancouver	Tournament
Bronze medal – third place	2006 Turin	Tournament
World Championship
Gold medal – first place	2005 Sweden	Tournament
Gold medal – first place	2008 China	Tournament
Gold medal – first place	2009 Finland	Tournament
Silver medal – second place	1999 Finland	Tournament
Silver medal – second place	2000 Canada	Tournament
Silver medal – second place	2001 United States	Tournament
Silver medal – second place	2004 Canada	Tournament
Silver medal – second place	2007 Canada	Tournament
4 Nations Cup
Gold medal – first place	2003 Sweden	Tournament
Gold medal – first place	2008 United States	Tournament
Silver medal – second place	1998 Finland	Tournament
Silver medal – second place	1999 Canada	Tournament
Silver medal – second place	2000 United States	Tournament
Silver medal – second place	2002 Canada	Tournament
Silver medal – second place	2004 United States	Tournament
Silver medal – second place	2005 Finland	Tournament
Silver medal – second place	2006 Canada	Tournament
Silver medal – second place	2007 Sweden	Tournament

Natalie Rose Darwitz (born October 13, 1983) is an American ice hockey executive, coach, and retired player, most recently serving as general manager of the Minnesota Frost in the Professional Women's Hockey League (PWHL).

Darwitz was a member of the US national ice hockey team for more than a decade and served as team captain for several seasons, beginning with the 2007–08 season. Her decorated playing career was highlighted by three world championship gold medals, two Olympic silver medals, and an Olympic bronze medal. Darwitz was inducted into both the Hockey Hall of Fame and IIHF Hall of Fame in 2024.

== Career biography ==
=== Playing ===
Darwitz began skating at the age of five, and attended Eagan High School. From there, she was a veteran of ten years on the US National Team. She competed in two Olympics, leading the 2002 Olympics in goal scoring, and scoring the game-winning assist in the bronze-medal game in the 2006 Games. In three years of NCAA Hockey at her alma mater, Minnesota, she won back-to-back national championships, scored the championship goal in her final game with 1:08 to go versus Harvard (4–3), won the Most Outstanding Player of the NCAA women's ice hockey tournament Frozen Four, was named US Women's Player of the Year, and competed in an additional three IIHF Women's World Championship.

At the 2008 Worlds, Darwitz led the tournament in scoring and was named the Best Forward in the World by the International Ice Hockey Federation. She was also awarded the Bob Johnson Award by USA Hockey as the best male or female player representing the United States in international play.

Darwitz was the second leading scorer at the 2009 IIHF tournament with 10 points (three goals, seven assists).

=== Coaching ===
In August 2008, Darwitz was named assistant coach of her alma mater, the University of Minnesota's, women's ice hockey team. At the conclusion of the 08–09 NCAA campaign, she left to return as a full-time member of the US National Team.

On August 2, 2011, she announced her new position as the head coach of the Lakeville South High School girls' ice hockey team. The Lakeville South Cougars finished the 2011/2012 season with a record of 21–1–6. and the 2012/2013 season with a record of 16–2–9.

From the 2015–16 through 2020–21 seasons, she served as the head coach of the Hamline University women's ice hockey team. They finished the 2017–18 season by going to the Frozen Four and placing 3rd in the nation. On July 29, 2021, she was hired as an assistant coach for her alma mater, the University of Minnesota women's hockey team.

On June 7, 2023, she was announced as co-head coach of the Hill-Murray women's hockey team, along with Jake Bobrowski.

=== Managing ===
On September 1, 2023, the Professional Women's Hockey League (PWHL) announced that Darwitz would be the general manager for the new PWHL Minnesota team. Darwitz and PWHL Minnesota parted ways in June 2024, shortly after winning the league's inaugural championship.

== Personal life ==
Darwitz has two siblings, and her parents are Scott and Nancy. She has two sons.

== Accomplishments ==
- 2002 Winter Olympic All Tournament Team – voted on by the International Ice Hockey Federation
- 2005 Bob Allen Women's Player of the Year Award – awarded by USA Hockey
- 2005 NCAA Frozen Four Most Outstanding Player
- WCHA Team of the Decade (2000s)
- 2024 Inducted into the IIHF Hall of Fame as a player, during the medal ceremony of the 2024 IIHF World Championship.
- 2024 Inducted into the Hockey Hall of Fame as a player, on November 11, 2024.

== Career statistics ==
=== International ===
Year	Team	Event	Result	GP	G	A	Pts
1999	United States	WWC	2nd place, silver medalist(s)	5	2	1	3
2000	United States	WWC	2nd place, silver medalist(s)	5	2	6	8
2001	United States	WWC	2nd place, silver medalist(s)	5	3	1	4
2002	United States	OG	2nd place, silver medalist(s)	5	7	1	8
2004	United States	WWC	2nd place, silver medalist(s)	5	7	3	10
2005	United States	WWC	1st place, gold medalist(s)	5	2	2	4
2006	United States	OG	3rd place, bronze medalist(s)	5	3	3	6
2007	United States	WWC	2nd place, silver medalist(s)	5	4	5	9
2008	United States	WWC	1st place, gold medalist(s)	5	6	4	10
2009	United States	WWC	1st place, gold medalist(s)	5	3	7	10
2010	United States	OG	2nd place, silver medalist(s)	5	4	7	11
International Totals				55	43	40	83

=== Collegiate ===
			Regular season
Season	Team	League	GP	G	A	Pts
2002–03	Minnesota Golden Gophers	WCHA	33	33	35	68
2003–04	Minnesota Golden Gophers	WCHA	26	27	37	64
2004–05	Minnesota Golden Gophers	WCHA	40	42	72	114
NCAA Totals			99	102	144	246

=== Professional ===
			Regular season
Season	Team	League	GP	G	A	Pts
2006–07	Minnesota Whitecaps	WWHL	13	11	10	21
2007–08	Minnesota Whitecaps	WWHL	7	4	7	11
WWHL Totals			20	15	17	32

== Sources ==
- Müller, Stephan : International Ice Hockey Encyclopedia 1904–2005 / BoD GmbH Norderstedt, 2005 ISBN 3-8334-4189-5

Awards and achievements
Preceded by Hayley Wickenheiser	IIHF World Women's Championship Best Forward; 2008	Succeeded by Hayley Wickenheiser
Preceded by Krissy Wendell	Captain, United States Olympic Hockey Team; 2010	Succeeded by Meghan Duggan
