= Julie Chu =

American ice hockey player and coach

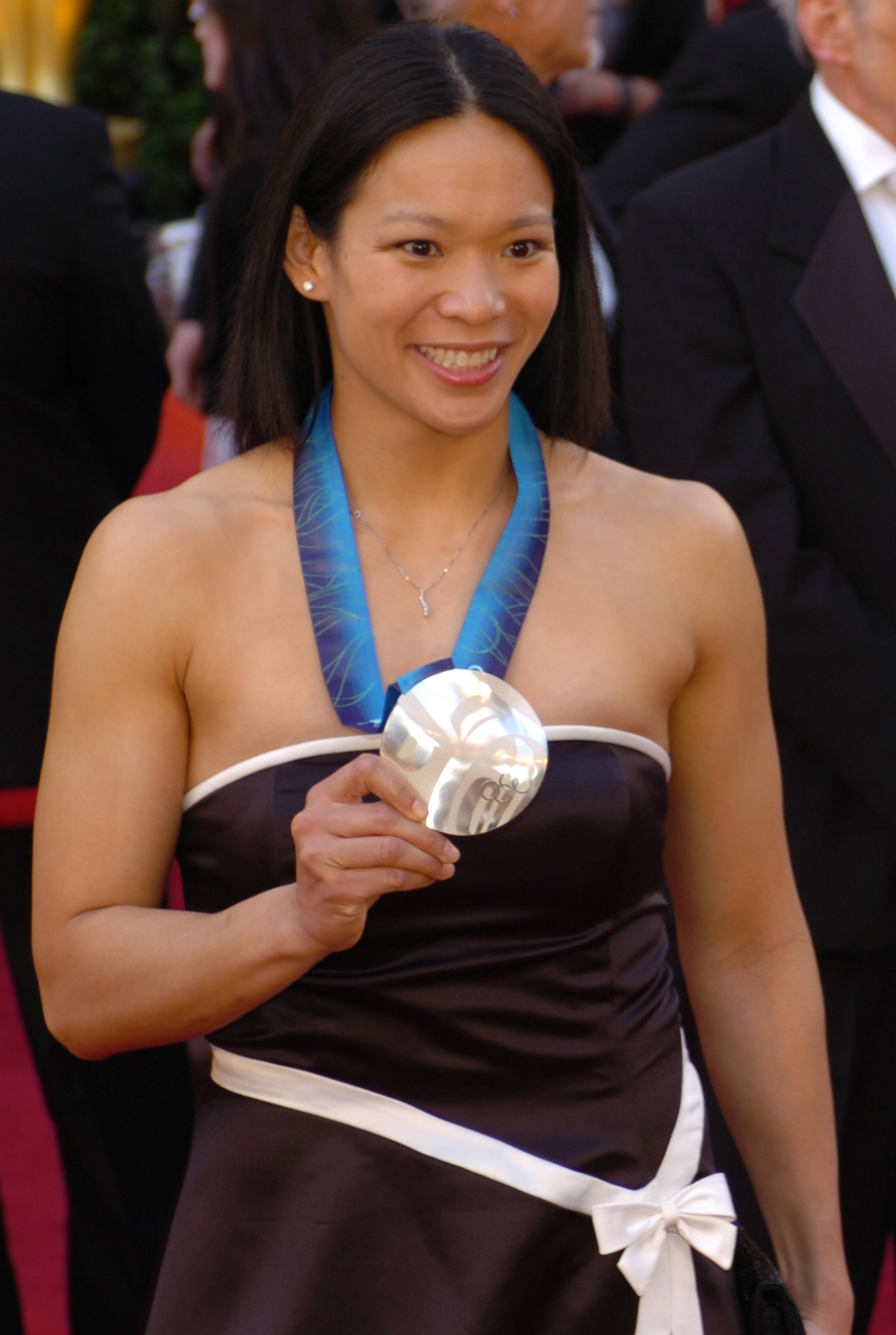
- Chu at the 2010 Academy Awards
- Born: March 13, 1982 (age 44) Fairfield, Connecticut, U.S.
- Height: 5 ft 8 in (173 cm)
- Weight: 147 lb (67 kg; 10 st 7 lb)
- Position: Forward
- Shot: Right
- Played for: Harvard Crimson (2002–2007); Minnesota Whitecaps (2007–2010); Montreal Stars (2010–2015)
- Current coach: Concordia Stingers
- Coached for: Minnesota Duluth Bulldogs (asst.); Union Dutchwomen (asst.)
- National team: United States
- Playing career: 1999–2017
- Coaching career: 2007–present

Julie Wu Chu (born March 13, 1982) is an American-Canadian former Olympic ice hockey player who played forward on the United States women's ice hockey team and defense with Les Canadiennes of the Canadian Women's Hockey League (CWHL). She won the Patty Kazmaier Award in 2007 for best female collegiate hockey player while at Harvard University. She finished her collegiate career as the all-time assists leader and points scorer in NCAA history with 284 points, until the record was broken in 2011. She was selected by fellow Team USA members to be the flag bearer at the Closing Ceremony of the 2014 Winter Olympics in Sochi.

Chu has served as head coach of the Concordia Stingers women's ice hockey program in the Réseau du sport étudiant du Québec (RSEQ) conference of U Sports since 2016. She was previously an assistant coach for the University of Minnesota Duluth and helped the Minnesota Duluth Bulldogs women's ice hockey team win their fourth NCAA Division I national championship in 2008 and served as an assistant coach with the Union Dutchwomen of Union College in 2010–2013.

== Early life ==
Julie Wu Chu was born in Fairfield, Connecticut, on March 13, 1982. Her father Wah was born in Guangzhou, China. Wah and his mother moved to Hong Kong when he was one year old. In 1967, when Wah was 16, they emigrated to New York City. Shortly after arriving, he met his future wife, Miriam, at a youth group meeting at a neighborhood church. Miriam's father is Chinese and her mother is Puerto Rican. Chu has two siblings.

Chu grew up with her family in Fairfield. As a child, she participated in soccer and figure skating before transitioning into youth hockey. She attended Choate Rosemary Hall but graduated from Northwood School in 2001. She deferred her acceptance into Harvard University until after the 2002 Winter Olympics. She graduated in 2007 with a concentration in psychology.

== Playing career ==
Chu is the first Asian American woman to play for the U.S. Olympic ice hockey team; she competed in the 2002, 2006, 2010, and 2014 Winter Olympics. She is tied as the second-most decorated U.S. female in Olympic Winter Games history. The four-time Olympian was chosen through a vote of each winter sport's team captain to carry the American flag during the closing ceremony of the 2014 Sochi Olympics. Chu was the second ice hockey player to serve as flag bearer for Team USA.

During her time at Harvard, Chu became the all-time leading scorer in NCAA history and was elected as team captain. In her four years at Harvard University, she was the all-time assists leader and obtained 284 points, the most in NCAA history. She won the Patty Kazmaier Award in 2007 for best female collegiate hockey player in the United States.

=== International hockey ===
Olympic medal record

Representing United States

Women's ice hockey

Olympic Games
Silver medal – second place	2002 Salt Lake City	Tournament
Silver medal – second place	2010 Vancouver	Tournament
Silver medal – second place	2014 Sochi	Tournament
Bronze medal – third place	2006 Turin	Tournament

IIHF World Women's Championships
Gold medal – first place	2005 Sweden	Tournament
Gold medal – first place	2008 China	Tournament
Gold medal – first place	2009 Finland	Tournament
Gold medal – first place	2011 Switzerland	Tournament
Gold medal – first place	2013 Canada	Tournament
Silver medal – second place	2001 United States	Tournament
Silver medal – second place	2004 Canada	Tournament
Silver medal – second place	2007 Canada	Tournament
Silver medal – second place	2012 United States	Tournament

Women's 4 Nations Cup
Gold medal – first place	2003 Sweden	Tournament
Gold medal – first place	2008 United States	Tournament
Gold medal – first place	2011 Sweden	Tournament
Gold medal – first place	2012 Finland	Tournament
Silver medal – second place	2000 United States	Tournament
Silver medal – second place	2004 United States	Tournament
Silver medal – second place	2005 Finland	Tournament
Silver medal – second place	2006 Canada	Tournament
Silver medal – second place	2007 Sweden	Tournament
Silver medal – second place	2009 Finland	Tournament
Silver medal – second place	2010 Canada	Tournament
Bronze medal – third place	2013 United States	Tournament

As a key member and assistant captain of Team USA, Chu won silver medals at the Olympic Games in 2002, 2010, and 2014, and a bronze in 2006. She has recorded 40 goals and 83 assists in 150 games with Team USA.

- 2005, 2008, 2009, 2011, & 2013 World Champion
- 2001, 2004, 2007, 2012 Silver Medalist

Chu was the leading scorer at the 2009 Women's World Ice Hockey Championships tournament with ten points (five goals, five assists).

=== Professional hockey ===
From 2007 to 2010, Chu played forward for the professional hockey Minnesota Whitecaps of the WWHL and won the 2010 Clarkson Cup. In 2010–11, she joined the Montreal Stars in the Canadian Women's Hockey League (CWHL) and claimed her second consecutive Clarkson Cup title, becoming the first player to win the Clarkson Cup with two different teams. In 2010–11 season, Chu was one of the top-5 leading scorers, racking up 35 points, 5 goals and 30 assists in only 19 games.

Chu has also participated in both the inaugural (2014) and second (2015–16) annual CWHL All-Star Games.

Chu and forward Natalie Spooner, from the Toronto Furies, were voted captains by the public for the second annual CWHL All-Star Game, taking place January 23, 2016 at the Air Canada Centre in Toronto, Ontario. More than 33,000 votes were cast during the public voting period, with Chu leading the polls, receiving 34% of the votes and Spooner coming in second with 23% in the public poll. The event made Chu the first non-Canadian CWHL All-Star Captain and the first visible-minority player to be named captain at an All-Star Game. Chu's Team Black went on to defeat Spooner's Team White by a score of 5–1.

== Coaching career ==
In 2007–08 Chu was an assistant coach for the University of Minnesota Duluth and helped the Bulldogs women's ice hockey team win their fourth NCAA Division I national championship. In the 2010–2011 hockey season, she joined the Union College women's hockey coaching staff, serving as assistant coach. She stepped down after the 2012–2013 season to focus full-time for the 2014 Winter Olympics in Sochi, Russia.

In 2014, Chu became an assistant coach with the Concordia Stingers women's ice hockey team. By 2024, she had become head coach of the Stingers.

== Personal life ==
Chu is married to Canadian hockey player and Olympic gold medalist Caroline Ouellette. Chu and Ouellette were both teammates for Les Canadiennes and served together as assistant coaches of the University of Minnesota Duluth and the Concordia Stingers. They previously captained their respective rivaling national teams, and skated against each other in three Olympic gold medal finals (2002, 2010, 2014) and over half a dozen world championships. They have two daughters. Chu is a permanent resident of Canada.

== Accomplishments and notes ==
- 2016–17: RSEQ Coach of the Year, Concordia Stingers
- 2014 US Olympic Team Flag Bearer – Closing Ceremonies
- 2014 Competed in her 4th Olympic Games for the United States (2002, 2006, 2010 and 2014)
- 2011 Clarkson Cup
- 2010 Clarkson Cup Tournament Most Valuable Player
- 2007–08 Assistant coach of the University of Minnesota Duluth women's ice hockey team, which won its fourth NCAA national championship that season. At the end of the 2007–08 season, Chu stepped down to prepare for the 2010 Winter Olympics in Vancouver.
- 2007 Patty Kazmaier Award winner (equivalent to the Hobey Baker for NCAA women's ice hockey)
- 2007 Bob Allen Women's Player of the Year Award – Awarded by USA Hockey
- 2005 USCHO.com Defensive Forward of the Year
- Four-time All American at Harvard
- Four-time finalist for Patty Kazmaier Award
- All-time NCAA scoring leader (284 points in four seasons)
- All-time NCAA assist leader (197 points in four seasons)
- Three-time All American
- Three-time NCAA Frozen Four finalist
- Four-time USA Hockey Girls national champion (Connecticut Polar Bears)

=== Media/national publicity biography ===
- Off The Podium.com Torino 2006 Screensaver
- February 13, 2006 -People Magazine
- February 2006 -Glamour Magazine
- US Anti-Doping Agency 2006 Campaign
- ESPN Magazine Body Issue, October 2011 edition

=== Endorsement campaigns ===
- Procter & Gamble / Bounty – 2014
- BP – 2014
- Ralph Lauren – 2014
- Citi – 2014
- Highmark Insurance / Blue Cross Blue Shield – 2014
- Easton Hockey – 2009 to present
- Upper Deck Trading Cards – 2010 and 2014
- Panini Trading Cards – 2014
- Procter & Gamble / Crest – 2010
- Nike – 2010
- Sega / Mario & Sonic at the Winter Olympic Games – 2010

== Career statistics ==
Career statistics are from Eliteprospects.com, or The Internet Hockey Database, or USA Hockey or the 2013 USA Women's National Team Media Guide.

=== Regular season and playoffs ===
			Regular season					Playoffs
Season	Team	League	GP	G	A	Pts	PIM	GP	G	A	Pts	PIM
2002-03	Harvard University	ECAC	34	42	51	93	14	—	—	—	—	—
2003–04	Harvard University	ECAC	32	15	41	56	28	—	—	—	—	—
2004–05	Harvard University	ECAC	33	13	56	69	22	—	—	—	—	—
2006–07	Harvard University	ECAC	30	18	48	66	20	—	—	—	—	—
2007–08	Minnesota Whitecaps	WWHL	6	3	4	7	—	—	—	—	—	—
2008–09	Minnesota Whitecaps	WWHL	12	2	6	8	—	—	—	—	—	—
2010–11	Montréal Stars	CWHL	19	5	30	35	4	4	0	4	4	0
2011–12	Montréal Stars	CWHL	15	5	10	15	2	4	1	3	4	4
2012–13	Montréal Stars	CWHL	14	2	7	9	2	4	0	1	1	0
2013–14	Montréal Stars	CWHL	2	0	0	0	0	3	0	1	1	2
2014–15	Montréal Stars	CWHL	20	2	15	17	12	3	0	0	0	0
2015–16	Les Canadiennes de Montréal	CWHL	15	3	9	12	4	3	2	2	4	0
2016–17	Les Canadiennes de Montréal	CWHL	10	1	4	5	4	—	—	—	—	—
Professional totals			113	23	85	107	28	21	3	11	14	6

=== International ===
Year	Team	Event	Result	GP	G	A	Pts	PIM
2000	USA	4 Nations Cup	2nd place, silver medalist(s)	4	2	5	7	—
2001	USA	WC	2nd place, silver medalist(s)	5	1	7	8	2
2002	USA	OG	2nd place, silver medalist(s)	5	2	2	4	2
2003	USA	4 Nations Cup	1st place, gold medalist(s)	4	0	1	1	0
2004	USA	WC	2nd place, silver medalist(s)	4	1	1	2	2
2004	USA	4 Nations Cup	2nd place, silver medalist(s)	4	0	2	2	—
2005	USA	WC	1st place, gold medalist(s)	5	2	4	6	2
2005	USA	4 Nations Cup	2nd place, silver medalist(s)	4	0	0	0	4
2006	USA	OG	3rd place, bronze medalist(s)	5	0	5	5	0
2006	USA	4 Nations Cup	2nd place, silver medalist(s)	4	0	1	1	4
2007	USA	WC	2nd place, silver medalist(s)	5	0	3	3	0
2007	USA	4 Nations Cup	2nd place, silver medalist(s)	4	0	1	1	4
2008	USA	WC	1st place, gold medalist(s)	5	0	7	7	2
2008	USA	4 Nations Cup	1st place, gold medalist(s)	4	2	0	2	0
2009	USA	WC	1st place, gold medalist(s)	5	5	5	10	0
2009	USA	4 Nations Cup	2nd place, silver medalist(s)	4	0	1	1	0
2010	USA	OG	2nd place, silver medalist(s)	5	2	4	6	0
2010	USA	4 Nations Cup	2nd place, silver medalist(s)	4	1	0	1	4
2011	USA	WC	1st place, gold medalist(s)	5	1	6	7	0
2011	USA	12 Nations	—	6	2	4	6	—
2011	USA	4 Nations Cup	1st place, gold medalist(s)	4	1	0	1	—
2012	USA	WC	2nd place, silver medalist(s)	5	2	1	3	2
2012	USA	4 Nations Cup	1st place, gold medalist(s)	4	1	0	1	—
2013	USA	WC	1st place, gold medalist(s)	5	1	0	1	0
2013	USA	4 Nations Cup	3rd place, bronze medalist(s)	3	0	0	0	2
2014	USA	OG	2nd place, silver medalist(s)	5	0	1	1	2
Senior totals				117	26	61	87	32

Awards and achievements
Preceded by Sara Bauer	Patty Kazmaier Award; 2006–07	Succeeded by Sarah Vaillancourt
