= Colleen Sostorics =

Canadian ice hockey player

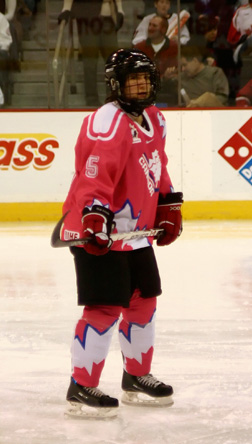
- Born: December 17, 1979 (age 46) Kennedy, Saskatchewan, Canada
- Height: 5 ft 4 in (163 cm)
- Weight: 168 lb (76 kg; 12 st 0 lb)
- Position: Defence
- Shot: Right
- WWHL team: Calgary Oval X-Treme
- National team: Canada
- Playing career: 2000–2010
Medal record
Women's ice hockey
Representing Canada
Olympic Games
Gold medal – first place	2002 Salt Lake City	Tournament
Gold medal – first place	2006 Turin	Tournament
Gold medal – first place	2010 Vancouver	Tournament
IIHF World Women's Championships
Gold medal – first place	2001 United States	Tournament
Gold medal – first place	2004 Canada	Tournament
Gold medal – first place	2007 Canada	Tournament
Silver medal – second place	2005 Sweden	Tournament
Silver medal – second place	2008 China	Tournament
Silver medal – second place	2009 Finland	Tournament
4 Nations Cup
Gold medal – first place	2001 Finland	Tournament
Gold medal – first place	2002 Canada	Tournament
Gold medal – first place	2004 United States	Tournament
Gold medal – first place	2006 Canada	Tournament
Gold medal – first place	2007 Sweden	Tournament
Silver medal – second place	2003 Sweden	Tournament
Under 22 Women's Team
Gold medal – first place	1999 Germany	Christmas Cup
Gold medal – first place	2000 Germany	U22 4 Nations Cup
Gold medal – first place	2001 Switzerland	U22 3 Nations Cup

Colleen Kay Sostorics (born December 17, 1979, in Kennedy, Saskatchewan) is a Canadian retired women's ice hockey defenseman. She played extensively for Canada at the international level, including three Olympic gold medals (2002 in Turin, 2006 in Salt Lake City, and 2010 in Vancouver). At the Women's World Championships, Sostorics helped Canada to three gold and three silver medals, and at the 4 Nations Cup, she captured five gold medals and one silver medal. When not playing with Canada, she competed at the club level for the Calgary Oval X-Treme, in the Western Women's Hockey League (WWHL).

== Playing career ==
=== Minor hockey ===
Colleen Sostorics began playing hockey in her hometown of Kennedy, Saskatchewan, on the local boys' teams until the age of 17. In 1996, she captained her boys' hockey team at the bantam level. She played for Team Saskatchewan at the 1995 Canada Winter Games and the 1997 National Under-18 Championship.

=== University ===
After completing her minor hockey career in Saskatchewan, she accepted an offer to move to attend the University of Calgary, where she played for the women's hockey team. After the 1997–98 season, Sostorics was named to the All-Star Team after the Canada West Championship Tournament. Calgary captured the bronze medal at this tournament. She earned this honour again after the 1998–99 Canada West Championship Tournament. Calgary captured the silver medal at the Canada West Tournament in 1998–99. In addition to the Canada West honours, Sostorics was named a Canadian Interuniversity Athletics Union (CIAU) All-Canadian after both the 1997–98 and 1998–99 seasons. After the 1999–00 Canada West season, Sostorics was named a Canada West Second Team All-Star.

=== Club team ===
She played for Alberta in the Esso National Women's Championship and won the Abby Hoffman Cup in 2001, 2003 and 2007.

=== International ===
In 1999, Sostorics made her Team Canada debut with the Under-22 National Team at the 1999 Christmas Cup, winning a gold medal. In 2000 and 2001, she continued to play with the Under-22 team, capturing gold medals at the Nations Cup tournament both years. She served as team captain during the 2000–01 season. Her performance at the Under-22 level earned her a spot on the Senior Women's National team for the 2001 World Women's Hockey Championship. At this tournament, she contributed two goals and an assist as Canada won the gold medal.

In 2002, Sostorics was named to Canada's team for the 2002 Winter Olympics, held in Salt Lake City, Utah. During the tournament, she contributed two assists as Canada took the gold medal. In 2004 and 2005, she also played at the World Championships, winning gold and silver medals respectively.

On September 14, 2010, Hockey Canada announced that Sostorics, along with three other players retired from international hockey.

== Personal ==
Her parents' names are Lanny and Jean. She has one brother, Mark. After winning a gold medal at the 2002 Winter Olympics, her hometown of Kennedy named a street after her. She convocated with a bachelor's degree in economics from the University of Calgary in 2004.

During her youth, Sostorics competed in soccer and fastball in addition to playing hockey. In 1997, she won provincial championships in all three sports. She was named Most Valuable Player at provincial fastball tournaments in 1994 and 1995. Now, she plays rugby in addition to hockey. She won a national rugby championship with Team Alberta in 2003.

== Statistics ==
=== International ===
Year	Team	Event	GP	G	A	Pts	PIM
1999	Canada	U22	9	1	2	3	8
2000	Canada	U22	7	0	5	5	12
2001	Canada	U22	4	1	0	1	0
2001	Canada	WWC	5	2	1	3	2
2001	Canada	3NC	4	0	3	3	4
2002	Canada	Olympics	5	0	2	2	4
2002	Canada	4NC	4	1	0	1	2
2003	Canada	4NC	4	0	1	1	2
2004	Canada	WWC	5	1	1	2	2
2004	Canada	4NC	4	0	1	1	0
2005	Canada	WWC	5	0	0	0	4
2002	Canada	Olympics	5	0	2	2	4
2005	Canada	Torino Ice	4	0	1	1	2
2006	Canada	Olympics	4	0	1	1	2
2006	Canada	4NC	4	1	3	4	4
2007	Canada	WWC	5	0	3	3	2
2007	Canada	4NC	4	1	1	2	8
2008	Canada	WWC	5	0	2	2	10
2009	Canada	WWC	5	1	1	2	2
2010	Canada	Olympics	5	1	5	6	2
U22 int'l totals			20	2	8	10	10
Women's Senior Team int'l totals			119	11	41	52	92

=== Club team ===
			Regular season					Playoffs
Season	Team	League	GP	G	A	Pts	PIM	GP	G	A	Pts	PIM
1999–00	Calgary Oval X-Treme	Alberta	17	3	7	10	—	—	—	—	—	—
2000–01	Calgary Oval X-Treme	Alberta	17	4	6	10	4	—	—	—	—	—
2002–03	Calgary Oval X-Treme	NWHL	16	5	13	18	32	1	1	1	2	0
2003–04	Calgary Oval X-Treme	NWHL	6	5	5	10	2	2	0	0	0	0
2004–05	Calgary Oval X-Treme	WWHL	16	7	16	23	28	3	2	1	3	0
2006–07	Calgary Oval X-Treme	WWHL	20	15	21	36	31	—	—	—	—	—
2007–08	Calgary Oval X-Treme	WWHL	19	9	17	26	8	3	1	0	1	4
2008–09	Calgary Oval X-Treme	WWHL	22	7	18	25	6	2	2	1	3	0
Alberta Totals			34	7	13	20	4	—	—	—	—	—
NWHL Totals			22	10	18	28	34	3	1	1	2	0
WWHL Totals			77	38	72	110	73	8	5	2	7	4

Statistics Source

== Awards and honours ==
- Top Defender, 2003 Esso Women's Nationals
