= Jenny Brine =

Canadian ice hockey player

- Born: April 21, 1987 (age 39) Truro, Nova Scotia, Canada
- Height: 5 ft 8 in (173 cm)
- Position: Forward
- Shot: Right
- CWHL team: Toronto Furies (2010-13)
- Playing career: 2005–2015
Medal record
Women's ice hockey
Representing Canada
ISBHF World Street Hockey Championships
Gold medal – first place	2009 Czech Republic	Team
Silver medal – second place	2011 Slovakia	Team
Gold medal – first place	2013 Canada	Team

Jenny Brine is a former women’s ice hockey player. Having played at the NCAA level with the Harvard Crimson women's ice hockey program, she was also a member of the Toronto Furies from 2010-13. Brine would also appear with the Canada women's national ball hockey team at three ISBHF World Championships.

== Playing career ==
=== CWHL ===
During the 2012-13 CWHL season, Brine and her Furies teammates participated in the first regular season game to be contested in an NHL arena. Hosted at Toronto’s Air Canada Centre on November 17, 2012, the Furies competed against Team Alberta. During the second period, Brine scored a goal as Wakefield and Alexandra Hoffmeyer both gained assists.

The last goal of her CWHL career took place on November 24, 2012 against the Montreal Stars. Scoring in the second period, Rebecca Johnston was credited with the assist. Brine’s final point in CWHL play took place on January 12, 2013 against the Brampton Thunder. Along with Johnston, the two earned the assist on a goal scored by Jennifer Wakefield during the third period.

=== Ball hockey ===
Brine was among the members of the Canadian national women’s team that captured the gold medal on home soil at the 2013 ISBHF World Street Hockey Championships in St. John’s, Newfoundland, Canada. Of note, she was one of four CWHL players named to the 2013 roster, including Chelsea Purcell of Team Alberta, Mallory Johnston of the Brampton Thunder, and her Furies teammate Britni Smith.

== Career stats ==
Season	Team	League	GP	G	A	Pts	+/-	PIM
2005-06	Harvard Crimson	ECAC	35	18	13	31
2006-07	Harvard Crimson	ECAC	33	23	16	39
2007-08	Harvard Crimson	ECAC	34	20	23	43		18
2008-09	Harvard Crimson	ECAC	29	16	15	31		18
2009-10
2010-11	Toronto Furies	CWHL	29	10	4	14	+7	12
2011-12	Toronto Furies	CWHL	27	7	7	14	+13	2
2012-13	Toronto Furies	CWHL	23	2	3	5	+3	6

== Awards and honours ==
- Honourable Mention All-Ivy League, 2007–08, Forward, Harvard (Junior)
- 2009 Third Team All-ECAC
- 2015 CBHA Nationals, Tournament Most Valuable Player
- 2015 CBHA Nationals, All-Star Team Selection
