= 2004–05 Mercyhurst Lakers women's ice hockey season =

American college ice hockey team season

These are the highlights of the 2004-05 Mercyhurst Lakers women's ice hockey season.

== Regular season ==
- October 31: Against the Bemidji State Beavers, Chrissy Yule had a multiple point game.
- November 23: Chrissy Yule had a multiple point game versus the Colgate Raiders
- December 7: In a game against CHA opponent Niagara, Chrissy Yule had a multiple point game.

=== Players ===
- Stephanie Bourbeau appeared in all 37 games and was tied for second on the Lakers in goals (18). Her 30 points ranked third on the squad. The six game-winning goals she scored led the Lakers, while her plus minus of +31 led the team.
- Netminder Desi Clark appeared in 25 games and recorded a record of 16-7-2 record. In addition, she had a 1.25 goals against average, .940 save percentage, and seven shutouts. She became Mercyhurst's first ever Division I All-American.
- Julia Colizza appeared in all 37 games for the Lakers. She put together a 25-point year (8 goals and 17 assists). Of her 8 goals, three were on the power play, one was short handed, and one was a game-winner. Statistically, Colizza ranked third on the team in assists and fifth in points.
- Laura Hosier appeared in 12 games and accumulated with a perfect record of 12-0-0. Hosier spent 719 minutes in goal. Statistically, she had a save percentage of .953 and her goals against average of 0.75. In addition, Hosier had four shutouts.
- Stephanie Jones appeared in 31 games and her 13 goals were fourth on the Lakers, while her 24 points ranked sixth overall. In the plus minus section, she had a plus 23.
- Danielle Lansing played in all 37 games and notched 15 points (five goals and ten assists). On the season, Lansing accumulated only five minor penalties.
- Teresa Marchese played in all 37 games while leading the Lakers in goals (21), assists (31), points (52), and plus/minus (+34).
- Sara McDonald tied for first on the Lakers in game-winning goals with four and had the only short-handed goal on the team. In the CHA, she tied for fourth in goals, tied for seventh in points, and finished first in game-winning and short-handed goals.
- Samantha Shirley played in all 37 games. Statistically, she ranked second on the team in goals with 18. Her 19 assists and 37 points also ranked second on the Lakers. Her 5 power play goals were tied for third.
- Chrissy Yule was the Lakers team captain and played in all 37 games. Yule put together a 21-point season (7 goals and 14 assists). Her 14 assists were tied for fifth on the team.

== Postseason ==
- March 19, 2005. The Mercyhurst Lakers and Harvard Crimson met in the NCAA Women’s Division I quarterfinals. The match had lasted 12 minutes into the third overtime. Harvard player Julie Chu would score the game-winning goal. Desi Clark made 78 saves in the triple overtime loss to Harvard during the NCAA Quarterfinals, an NCAA record.

== Awards and honors ==
- Danielle Ayearst, College Hockey America (CHA) All-Tournament Team.
- Stephanie Bourbeau, CHA All-Conference Second Team
- Stephanie Bourbeau, CHA All-Tournament Team
- Desi Clark, Patty Kazmaier Top Ten Finalist
- Desi Clark, CHA Student-Athlete of the Year,
- Desi Clark, Division I All-American
- Desi Clark, Mercyhurst senior Female Athlete of the Year
- Stephanie Jones, CHA All Rookie Team
- Danielle Lansing, CHA All-Tournament Team.
- Teresa Marchese, CHA All-Tournament MVP
- Teresa Marchese, All-Conference Player of the Year
- Sara McDonald, CHA Conference All-Tournament Team
- Samantha Shirley, CHA All-Conference Second Team
