= 2005–06 Harvard Crimson women's ice hockey season =

ECAC tournament championships
- Conference: ECAC
- Home ice: Bright Hockey Center

Record

Coaches and captains
- Head coach: Katey Stone

The 2005–06 Harvard Crimson women's ice hockey team represented Harvard University. The Crimson won the ECAC tournament championship and appeared in the NCAA tournament. The Crimson had to endure the absence of three players (Caitlin Cahow, Julie Chu, Sarah Vaillancourt) during the entire season as they were in training to participate in ice hockey at the 2006 Winter Olympics.

== Player stats ==
Note: GP= Games played; G= Goals; A= Assists; PTS = Points; GW = Game Winning Goals; PPL = Power Play Goals; SHG = Short Handed Goals

Player	GP	G	A	Pts	GW	PPL	SHG
Jennifer Raimondi	35	12	25	37	1	5	0
Jenny Brine	35	18	13	31	2	9	0
Sarah Wilson	35	13	11	24	3	7	0
Liza Solley	35	11	11	22	5	1	1
Katie Johnston	34	7	14	21	1	4	1
Jennifer Sifers	35	11	8	19	2	2	0
Lindsay Weaver	35	2	16	18	0	1	0
Laura Brady	35	4	11	15	1	1	0
Carrie Schroyer	35	6	6	12	1	1	1
Adrienne Bernakevitch	35	3	7	10	1	1	0
Jessica MacKenzie	31	1	5	6	1	0	0
Kati Vaughn	35	0	6	6	0	0	0
Nora Sluzas	35	0	4	4	0	0	0
Jodi Krakower	35	1	1	2	0	0	0
Kirsten Kester	35	1	1	2	0	0	0
Lauren Herrington	35	1	1	2	0	0	0
Emily Vitt	1	0	0	0	0	0	0
Brenna McLean	35	0	0	0	0	0	0
Ali Boe	28	0	0	0	0	0	0
Brittany Martin	6	0	0	0	0	0	0

== 2006 ECAC Tournament ==
Round	Opponent	Score
Quarterfinal	# 5 Clarkson	1-0
Quarterfinal	# 5 Clarkson	1-2 (ot)
Quarterfinal	# 5 Clarkson	2-1 (2 ot)
Semifinal	# 1 St. Lawrence	3-1
Final	# 3 Brown	4-3

== Awards and honors ==
- Sarah Wilson, 2006 ECAC Tournament Most Valuable Player,
