= United States women's national ice hockey team =

United States
- Nickname: Team USA
- Association: USA Hockey
- General manager: Katie Million
- Head coach: John Wroblewski
- Assistants: Shari Dickerman; Molly Engstrom; Josh Sciba
- Captain: Hilary Knight
- Most games: Angela Ruggiero (256)
- Top scorer: Cammi Granato (186)
- Most points: Cammi Granato (343)
- Team colors
- IIHF code: USA
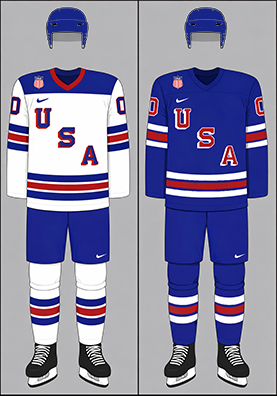

Ranking
- Current IIHF: 1 (3 June 2026)
- Highest IIHF: 1 (first in 2009)
- Lowest IIHF: 2 (first in 2003)

First international
- Canada 2–1 United States (North York or Mississauga, Canada; April 21, 1987)

Biggest win
- United States 20–0 Netherlands (North York or Mississauga, Canada; April 23, 1987)

Biggest defeat
- Canada 8–0 United States (Tampere, Finland; April 26, 1992)

Olympics
- Appearances: 8 (first in 1998)
- Medals: Gold: 3 (1998, 2018, 2026); Silver: 4 (2002, 2010, 2014, 2022); Bronze: 1 (2006)

IIHF Women's World Championship
- Appearances: 25 (first in 1990)
- Best result: Gold: 12 (2005, 2008, 2009, 2011, 2013, 2015, 2016, 2017, 2019, 2023, 2025, 2026)

International record (W–L–T)
- 324–112–3

Medal record

Olympic Games
Gold medal – first place	1998 Nagano	Team
Gold medal – first place	2018 Pyeongchang	Team
Gold medal – first place	2026 Milano Cortina	Team
Silver medal – second place	2002 Salt Lake City	Team
Silver medal – second place	2010 Vancouver	Team
Silver medal – second place	2014 Sochi	Team
Silver medal – second place	2022 Beijing	Team
Bronze medal – third place	2006 Turin	Team

Women's World Championship
Gold medal – first place	2005 Sweden	
Gold medal – first place	2008 China	
Gold medal – first place	2009 Finland	
Gold medal – first place	2011 Switzerland	
Gold medal – first place	2013 Canada	
Gold medal – first place	2015 Sweden	
Gold medal – first place	2016 Canada	
Gold medal – first place	2017 United States	
Gold medal – first place	2019 Finland	
Gold medal – first place	2023 Canada	
Gold medal – first place	2025 Czechia	
Gold medal – first place	2026 Denmark	
Silver medal – second place	1990 Canada	
Silver medal – second place	1992 Finland	
Silver medal – second place	1994 United States	
Silver medal – second place	1997 Canada	
Silver medal – second place	1999 Finland	
Silver medal – second place	2000 Canada	
Silver medal – second place	2001 United States	
Silver medal – second place	2004 Canada	
Silver medal – second place	2007 Canada	
Silver medal – second place	2012 United States	
Silver medal – second place	2021 Canada	
Silver medal – second place	2022 Denmark	
Silver medal – second place	2024 United States	

Women's Pacific Rim Championship
Silver medal – second place	1995 United States	
Silver medal – second place	1996 Canada	

4 Nations Cup
Gold medal – first place	1997 Lake Placid	
Gold medal – first place	2003 Skövde	
Gold medal – first place	2008 Lake Placid	
Gold medal – first place	2011 Nyköping	
Gold medal – first place	2012 Tikkurila	
Gold medal – first place	2015 Sundsvall Municipality	
Gold medal – first place	2016 Järvenpää	
Gold medal – first place	2017 Tampa	
Gold medal – first place	2018 Saskatoon	
Silver medal – second place	1996 Ottawa	
Silver medal – second place	1998 Kuortane	
Silver medal – second place	1999 Montreal	
Silver medal – second place	2000 Provo, Utah	
Silver medal – second place	2002 Kitchener	
Silver medal – second place	2004 Lake Placid	
Silver medal – second place	2005 Hameenlinna	
Silver medal – second place	2006 Kitchener	
Silver medal – second place	2007 Leksand	
Silver medal – second place	2009 Tikkurila	
Silver medal – second place	2010 Newfoundland and Labrador	
Silver medal – second place	2014 Kamloops	
Bronze medal – third place	2013 Lake Placid	

The United States women's national ice hockey team represents the United States in women's international ice hockey. The team operates under USA Hockey, the governing body for organized ice hockey in the United States.

Team USA has been one of the most successful women's ice hockey national teams in international play. The team has medaled in every major tournament, most recently winning gold at both the 2026 Winter Olympics and the 2026 IIHF Women's World Championship.

At the Olympic Games, the team has won three gold medals (1998, 2018, 2026), along with four silver medals (2002, 2010, 2014, 2022) and one bronze (2006), and has medaled at every tournament since women's ice hockey was finally included starting in 1998. At the IIHF Women's World Championship, the United States has won twelve gold medals (2005, 2008, 2009, 2011, 2013, 2015, 2016, 2017, 2019, 2023, 2025, 2026) and more than twenty total medals, establishing itself as a top contender and forming one of the sport's most prominent rivalries with Canada, with the two nations dominating international competition for decades.

== History ==
Women's ice hockey became an Olympic sport at the 1998 Winter Olympics, where the US won the gold medal in an upset over perennial world champions Canada. As of 2026, in five of the last six Winter Olympics the gold medal match was between the United States and Canada, with the United States winning gold in 2026 Winter Olympics. Since their inclusion in the Olympics' the women's team has appeared in all but one gold medal match with each appearance playing against the Canadian women's team.

On March 15, 2017, players for the U.S. women's ice hockey team announced that they would boycott the 2017 World Championship over inequitable support and conditions for women's ice hockey unless concessions were made by USA Hockey. Members of the team including captain Meghan Duggan made public statements regarding poor pay and conditions for female hockey players. The players were publicly supported by the players' associations for the NBA, WNBA, MLB and the NHLPA. On March 28, 2017, the players agreed to play in the World Championship after an agreement was struck with USA Hockey to increase player pay and support for women's development.

In 2023, team member Laila Edwards became the first black woman to play for the US, and became the first black woman of any country to win a gold medal in women's hockey in 2026. In May 2025, Olympic team captain Hilary Knight announced that the 2026 Winter Olympics would be her fifth and final Olympics, Knight is the only United States female player to win five medals at the Olympics.

During the 2026 Winter Olympics the women's team was undefeated with a perfect record allowing for only one point in their opening game against Czechia during the preliminary rounds prior to the gold medal. The team outscored all of their opponents at 33–2 and won all seven of their games. Megan Keller scored an overtime goal to defeat Canada at 2–1, after Hilary Knight tied the game in the final moments of regulation. Members of the team were named to Olympic all star teams with Caroline Harvey being named a MVP and best Defender, Harvey, Laila Edwards, and Hannah Bilka being named to the Media All-Star Team. Of the 23-person team, nine players are 23 or younger, 12 are newcomers and four made their Olympic debut in the 2022 Beijing Olympics.

After the 2026 Winter Olympics men's ice hockey teams gold medal game, President Trump called the men's team and joked that he would also need to invite the Women’s Olympic team–who had also won gold–to the White House and State of the Union or risk being impeached. The women's team rejected the invite to the White House, with captain Hilary Knight calling the joke distasteful and lamented the overshadowing of the teams' connections, and highlighted a good learning point about how women in sports are discussed. During the Olympics the women's team met and dined with actor Stanley Tucci in Milan, Italy. The women's team was also invited by Flavor Flav along with other female Olympian and Paralympian athletes to celebrate their achievements in July 2026 through the She Got Game weekend event.

== Rivalry with Canada ==
Team USA has a long-term rivalry with Canada. Since women's ice hockey was introduced to the Winter Olympics in 1998, every Olympic gold medal game except one has featured the United States against Canada, with the U.S. winning multiple titles in those meetings. This rivalry often draws significant media attention and fan interest. The U.S.–Canada rivalry has produced historic moments and elevated women's ice hockey in both countries while raising the bar for excellence in the sport worldwide.

Historically, the rivalry has been most visible during the Winter Olympics and World Championships. While Canada initially dominated the early Olympic competitions, the United States has also won Olympic gold in head-to-head finals, including a dramatic 2–1 overtime victory over Canada at the 2026 Winter Olympics in Milan. At the IIHF Women's World Championships, the two nations have frequently met in gold-medal games, largely dominating the sport and consistently competing for the top spot.

=== Rivalry Series ===
Beyond major tournaments, USA Hockey and Hockey Canada have formalized the rivalry through the Rivalry Series, an annual set of exhibition games designed to showcase top international women's hockey and prepare both teams for major championships. It has been played annually since its inception in 2018–19. The 2025 Rivalry Series featured four games between the two nations, with the United States sweeping all four matchups and outscoring Canada by a combined 24–7. Players and media describe the rivalry as exceptionally competitive and emotionally charged, with elite talent and exciting games becoming the norm whenever the teams meet. Team USA players have emphasized that beating Canada is a central focus of many national team cycles, with heightened preparation and intensity leading up to the Olympics.

== Tournament record ==
=== Olympic Games ===
Year	Result	Position	GP	W	L	T	GF	GA	Coach	Captain
(Japan) 1998 Nagano	Gold medal	1st place, gold medalist(s)	6	6	0	0	36	8	Ben Smith	Cammi Granato
(United States) 2002 Salt Lake City	Silver medal	2nd place, silver medalist(s)	5	4	1	0	33	4	Ben Smith	Cammi Granato
(Italy) 2006 Turin	Bronze medal	3rd place, bronze medalist(s)	5	4	1	0	24	6	Ben Smith	Krissy Wendell-Pohl
(Canada) 2010 Vancouver	Silver medal	2nd place, silver medalist(s)	5	4	1	—	40	4	Mark Johnson	Natalie Darwitz
(Russia) 2014 Sochi	Silver medal	2nd place, silver medalist(s)	5	3	2	—	22	8	Katey Stone	Meghan Duggan
(South Korea) 2018 Pyeongchang	Gold medal	1st place, gold medalist(s)	5	4	1	—	17	5	Robb Stauber	Meghan Duggan
(China) 2022 Beijing	Silver medal	2nd place, silver medalist(s)	7	5	2	—	30	11	Joel Johnson	Kendall Coyne Schofield
(Italy) 2026 Milan	Gold medal	1st place, gold medalist(s)	7	7	0	—	33	2	John Wroblewski	Hilary Knight
Total	3 titles	8/8	45	37	8	0	235	48	—N/a	

=== IIHF Women's World Championship ===
Year	Result	Position	GP	W	OTW	OTL	L	GF	GA
(Canada) 1990	Runner-up	2nd place, silver medalist(s)	5	4	0	0	1	50	15
(Finland) 1992	Runner-up	2nd place, silver medalist(s)	5	4	0	0	1	37	16
(United States) 1994	Runner-up	2nd place, silver medalist(s)	5	4	0	0	1	41	10
(Canada) 1997	Runner-up	2nd place, silver medalist(s)	5	3	0	0	1	29	7
1998	Not held during 1998 Winter Olympics								
(Finland) 1999	Runner-up	2nd place, silver medalist(s)	5	4	0	0	1	31	6
(Canada) 2000	Runner-up	2nd place, silver medalist(s)	5	4	0	1	0	44	8
(United States) 2001	Runner-up	2nd place, silver medalist(s)	5	4	0	0	1	43	4
2002	Not held during 2002 Winter Olympics								
2003	Cancelled due to SARS outbreak in China								
(Canada) 2004	Runner-up	2nd place, silver medalist(s)	5	4	0	0	1	29	6
(Sweden) 2005	Champions	1st place, gold medalist(s)	5	4	1	0	0	28	4
2006	Not held during 2006 Winter Olympics								
(Canada) 2007	Runner-up	2nd place, silver medalist(s)	5	3	0	1	1	27	11
(China) 2008	Champions	1st place, gold medalist(s)	5	4	0	1	0	23	8
(Finland) 2009	Champions	1st place, gold medalist(s)	5	4	0	0	1	28	3
2010	Not held during 2010 Winter Olympics								
(Switzerland) 2011	Champions	1st place, gold medalist(s)	5	4	1	0	0	35	5
(United States) 2012	Runner-up	2nd place, silver medalist(s)	5	4	0	1	0	43	7
(Canada) 2013	Champions	1st place, gold medalist(s)	5	4	0	1	0	17	7
2014	Not held at top level during 2014 Winter Olympics								
(Sweden) 2015	Champions	1st place, gold medalist(s)	5	5	0	0	0	37	11
(Canada) 2016	Champions	1st place, gold medalist(s)	5	4	1	0	0	23	2
(United States) 2017	Champions	1st place, gold medalist(s)	5	4	1	0	0	28	5
2018	Not held at top level during 2018 Winter Olympics								
(Finland) 2019	Champions	1st place, gold medalist(s)	7	6	1	0	0	41	5
2020	Cancelled due to COVID-19 pandemic								
(Canada) 2021	Runner-up	2nd place, silver medalist(s)	7	5	0	1	1	28	10
(Denmark) 2022	Runner-up	2nd place, silver medalist(s)	7	6	0	0	1	53	7
(Canada) 2023	Champions	1st place, gold medalist(s)	7	6	0	1	0	43	12
(United States) 2024	Runner-up	2nd place, silver medalist(s)	7	5	1	1	0	36	9
(Czech Republic) 2025	Champions	1st place, gold medalist(s)	7	6	1	0	0	27	6
(Denmark) 2026	Champions	1st place, gold medalist(s)	7	7	0	0	0	56	4
(Canada) 2027	Qualified								
Total	12 Titles	25/28	139	112	7	8	11	877	188

=== IIHF Pacific Rim Championship ===
Year	Result	Position	GP	W	OTW	OTL	L	GF	GA
(United States) 1995	Runner-up	2nd place, silver medalist(s)	5	4	0	1	0	35	6
(Canada) 1996	Runner-up	2nd place, silver medalist(s)	5	3	0	0	2	27	9
Total	0 Title	2/2	10	7	0	1	2	62	15

=== 4 Nations Cup ===
Year	Result	Position	GP	W	OTW	OTL	L	GF	GA
(Canada) / (United States) 1996	Runner-up	2nd place, silver medalist(s)	5	2	1	0	2	12	10
(United States) / (Canada) 1997	Champions	1st place, gold medalist(s)	5	2	0	0	2	18	14
(Finland) 1998	Runner-up	2nd place, silver medalist(s)	4	2	0	1	1	10	10
(Canada) 1999	Runner-up	2nd place, silver medalist(s)	5	2	0	0	3	15	16
(United States) 2000	Runner-up	2nd place, silver medalist(s)	4	3	0	0	1	23	6
(Finland) 2001	Withdrew due to September 11 attacks								
(Canada) 2002	Runner-up	2nd place, silver medalist(s)	4	2	0	0	2	17	14
(Sweden) 2003	Champions	1st place, gold medalist(s)	4	4	0	0	0	17	2
(United States) 2004	Runner-up	2nd place, silver medalist(s)	4	2	0	0	1	14	7
(Finland) 2005	Runner-up	2nd place, silver medalist(s)	4	2	0	0	2	8	8
(Canada) 2006	Runner-up	2nd place, silver medalist(s)	4	2	0	0	2	14	10
(Sweden) 2007	Runner-up	2nd place, silver medalist(s)	4	2	0	0	2	9	9
(United States) 2008	Champions	1st place, gold medalist(s)	4	3	0	0	1	13	9
(Finland) 2009	Runner-up	2nd place, silver medalist(s)	4	3	0	0	1	11	9
(Canada) 2010	Runner-up	2nd place, silver medalist(s)	5	3	1	1	0	17	6
(Sweden) 2011	Champions	1st place, gold medalist(s)	4	2	1	0	1	23	6
(Finland) 2012	Champions	1st place, gold medalist(s)	4	3	0	0	1	23	4
(United States) 2013	Third place	3rd place, bronze medalist(s)	4	2	0	0	2	21	8
(Canada) 2014	Runner-up	2nd place, silver medalist(s)	4	2	0	1	1	12	6
(Sweden) 2015	Champions	1st place, gold medalist(s)	4	3	1	0	0	19	4
(Finland) 2016	Champions	1st place, gold medalist(s)	4	3	0	0	1	17	6
(United States) 2017	Champions	1st place, gold medalist(s)	4	4	0	0	0	22	5
(Canada) 2018	Champions	1st place, gold medalist(s)	4	4	0	0	0	17	5
(Sweden) 2019	Cancelled due to contract disputes between Swedish Ice Hockey Association and Swedish national team								
(Finland) / (Sweden) 2020	Not scheduled due to COVID-19 pandemic								
Total	9 Titles	22/25	92	57	4	3	26	352	174

== Team ==
=== Current roster ===
Roster for the 2026 IIHF Women's World Championship.

Head Coach: John Wroblewski

No.	Pos.	Name	Height	Weight	Birthdate	Team
2	D	Lee Stecklein	1.83 m (6 ft 0 in)	80 kg (180 lb)	23 April 1994 (age 32)	(United States) Minnesota Frost
3	D	Cayla Barnes	1.57 m (5 ft 2 in)	68 kg (150 lb)	7 January 1999 (age 27)	(United States) Detroit Clutch
4	D	Caroline Harvey	1.79 m (5 ft 10 in)	70 kg (150 lb)	14 October 2002 (age 24)	(Canada) Vancouver Goldeneyes
5	D	Megan Keller – A	1.80 m (5 ft 11 in)	75 kg (165 lb)	1 May 1996 (age 30)	(United States) Boston Fleet
6	D	Rory Guilday	1.78 m (5 ft 10 in)	73 kg (161 lb)	7 September 2002 (age 24)	(United States) San Jose Sea Lions
7	F	Lacey Eden	1.73 m (5 ft 8 in)	72 kg (159 lb)	2 May 2002 (age 24)	(United States) Vegas Vanguards
8	D	Haley Winn	1.67 m (5 ft 6 in)	68 kg (150 lb)	14 July 2003 (age 23)	(United States) Boston Fleet
9	F	Kirsten Simms	1.65 m (5 ft 5 in)	67 kg (148 lb)	31 August 2004 (age 22)	(Canada) Toronto Sceptres
10	D	Laila Edwards	1.85 m (6 ft 1 in)	90 kg (200 lb)	25 January 2004 (age 22)	(United States) San Jose Sea Lions
11	D	Emma Peschel	1.78 m (5 ft 10 in)	82 kg (181 lb)	20 January 2004 (age 22)	(United States) New York Sirens
12	F	Kelly Pannek	1.70 m (5 ft 7 in)	78 kg (172 lb)	29 December 1995 (age 30)	(United States) Minnesota Frost
13	F	Grace Zumwinkle	1.80 m (5 ft 11 in)	75 kg (165 lb)	23 April 1999 (age 27)	(United States) Minnesota Frost
16	F	Hayley Scamurra	1.72 m (5 ft 8 in)	82 kg (181 lb)	14 December 1994 (age 31)	(United States) Vegas Vanguards
18	F	Jesse Compher	1.78 m (5 ft 10 in)	66 kg (146 lb)	1 July 1999 (age 27)	(United States) Detroit Clutch
21	F	Hilary Knight – C	1.78 m (5 ft 10 in)	79 kg (174 lb)	12 July 1989 (age 37)	(United States) Detroit Clutch
22	F	Tessa Janecke	1.73 m (5 ft 8 in)	72 kg (159 lb)	12 May 2004 (age 22)	(United States) Vegas Vanguards
23	F	Hannah Bilka	1.64 m (5 ft 5 in)	65 kg (143 lb)	24 March 2001 (age 25)	(United States) Detroit Clutch
24	F	Joy Dunne	1.80 m (5 ft 11 in)	84 kg (185 lb)	13 June 2005 (age 21)	(United States) Ohio State University
25	F	Alex Carpenter – A	1.65 m (5 ft 5 in)	68 kg (150 lb)	13 April 1994 (age 32)	(United States) Seattle Torrent
27	F	Taylor Fox	1.78 m (5 ft 10 in)	74 kg (163 lb)	17 March 2000 (age 26)	(United States) Minnesota Frost
31	G	Aerin Frankel	1.64 m (5 ft 5 in)	65 kg (143 lb)	24 May 1999 (age 27)	(United States) Boston Fleet
32	F	Casey O'Brien	1.63 m (5 ft 4 in)	61 kg (134 lb)	21 August 2001 (age 25)	(United States) New York Sirens
33	G	Gwyneth Philips	1.65 m (5 ft 5 in)	68 kg (150 lb)	17 September 2000 (age 26)	(Canada) Ottawa Charge
35	G	Callie Shanahan	1.77 m (5 ft 10 in)	79 kg (174 lb)	26 May 2003 (age 23)	(United States) New York Sirens
37	F	Abbey Murphy	1.64 m (5 ft 5 in)	68 kg (150 lb)	14 April 2002 (age 24)	(United States) Seattle Torrent

=== Development team roster ===
Roster for the 2026 Collegiate Series.

Head coach: John Wroblewski

No.	Pos.	Name	Height	Weight	Birthdate	Team
2	F	Kelly Gorbatenko	1.8 m (5 ft 11 in)	70 kg (150 lb)	August 5, 2004 (age 22)	University of Wisconsin
3	F	Rae Mayer	1.73 m (5 ft 8 in)	75 kg (165 lb)	June 13, 2007 (age 19)	University of Minnesota Duluth
4	D	Emi Biotti	1.78 m (5 ft 10 in)	73 kg (161 lb)	January 4, 2007 (age 19)	Harvard University
5	D	Molly Boyle	1.73 m (5 ft 8 in)	68 kg (150 lb)	January 5, 2006 (age 20)	Yale University
6	D	Rose Dwyer	1.78 m (5 ft 10 in)	70 kg (150 lb)	April 7, 2006 (age 20)	Cornell University
7	F	Ava Lindsay	1.68 m (5 ft 6 in)	60 kg (130 lb)	February 20, 2005 (age 21)	University of Minnesota
8	F	Rylee Bartz	1.73 m (5 ft 8 in)	52 kg (115 lb)	October 1, 2004 (age 22)	Ohio State University
9	F	Ella Boerger	1.71 m (5 ft 7 in)	66 kg (146 lb)	October 20, 2004 (age 22)	University of St. Thomas
11	D	Maddie Murphy	1.71 m (5 ft 7 in)	61 kg (134 lb)	April 24, 2007 (age 19)	Boston College
12	F	Kaia Malachino	1.71 m (5 ft 7 in)	62 kg (137 lb)	November 2, 2004 (age 22)	Ohio State University
13	D	Rosie Klein	1.68 m (5 ft 6 in)	64 kg (141 lb)	February 19, 2005 (age 21)	Princeton University
15	F	Cassie Hall — A	1.71 m (5 ft 7 in)	70 kg (150 lb)	October 18, 2005 (age 21)	University of Wisconsin
16	F	Bella Fanale	1.65 m (5 ft 5 in)	73 kg (161 lb)	May 19, 2007 (age 19)	University of Minnesota
17	D	Lauren Zawoyski	1.78 m (5 ft 10 in)	64 kg (141 lb)	April 25, 2005 (age 21)	Minnesota State University
18	F	Chloe Boreen	1.68 m (5 ft 6 in)	59 kg (130 lb)	March 24, 2006 (age 20)	University of St. Thomas
22	D	Laney Potter — A	1.8 m (5 ft 11 in)	75 kg (165 lb)	December 5, 2004 (age 21)	University of Wisconsin
24	F	Maggie Scannell — C	1.78 m (5 ft 10 in)	73 kg (161 lb)	March 24, 2006 (age 20)	University of Wisconsin
25	D	Sophie Morrow	1.8 m (5 ft 11 in)	73 kg (161 lb)	May 1, 2007 (age 19)	Penn State University
27	F	Maddie Kaiser	1.71 m (5 ft 7 in)	68 kg (150 lb)	July 10, 2004 (age 22)	University of Minnesota
30	G	Ava McNaughton	1.83 m (6 ft 0 in)	86 kg (190 lb)	October 27, 2004 (age 22)	University of Wisconsin
31	G	Hailey Hansen	1.63 m (5 ft 4 in)	61 kg (134 lb)	December 31, 2004 (age 21)	Minnesota State University
33	G	Uma Corniea	1.78 m (5 ft 10 in)	70 kg (150 lb)	October 19, 2004 (age 22)	Princeton University
36	F	Quinn Taylor	1.71 m (5 ft 7 in)	73 kg (161 lb)	November 11, 2007 (age 19)	Boston University
37	F	Ava Thomas	1.71 m (5 ft 7 in)	66 kg (146 lb)	September 27, 2006 (age 20)	Boston College
38	F	Kassidy Carmichael	1.71 m (5 ft 7 in)	77 kg (170 lb)	October 14, 2006 (age 20)	Ohio State University

=== IIHF Women's World Championship directorate awards ===
Since 1990, the IIHF has given awards for each championship tournament to the best goalie, defenseman, and forward, and Most Valuable Player (MVP). The following team members have won awards:

Year	Player	Award
1990	Kelly Dyer	Goalie
1992	Cammi Granato	Forward
1994	Erin Whitten	Goalie
1999	Jenny Potter	Forward
2000	Angela Ruggiero	Defenseman
2001	Karyn Bye	Defenseman
2004	Angela Ruggiero	Defenseman
2005	Chanda Gunn	Goalie
2005	Angela Ruggiero	Defenseman
2005	Krissy Wendell	MVP
2007	Molly Engstrom	Defenseman
2008	Angela Ruggiero	Defenseman
2008	Natalie Darwitz	Forward
2011	Monique Lamoureux-Kolls	Forward
2012	Kelli Stack	Forward
2015	Hilary Knight	Forward
2015	Hilary Knight	MVP
2016	Hilary Knight	Forward
2016	Hilary Knight	MVP
2017	Brianna Decker	Forward
2017	Brianna Decker	MVP
2019	Kendall Coyne Schofield	Forward
2021	Lee Stecklein	Defenseman
2022	Nicole Hensley	Goalie
2022	Taylor Heise	Forward
2022	Taylor Heise	MVP
2023	Caroline Harvey	Defenseman
2024	Alex Carpenter	Forward
2024	Laila Edwards	MVP
2025	Aerin Frankel	Goalie
2025	Caroline Harvey	Defenseman
2026	Aerin Frankel	Goaltender
2026	Caroline Harvey	Defenceman
2026	Hilary Knight	Forward
2026	Caroline Harvey	MVP

== See also ==
- List of United States women's national ice hockey team rosters
- List of Olympic women's ice hockey players for the United States
