= 2016 4 Nations Cup =

Tournament details
- Host country: Finland
- Venues: 3 (in 3 host cities)
- Dates: 1–5 November
- Teams: 4

Final positions
- Champions: United States (7th title)
- Runners-up: Canada
- Third place: Finland
- Fourth place: Sweden

Tournament statistics
- Games played: 8
- Goals scored: 36 (4.5 per game)

The 2016 4 Nations Cup was a women's ice hockey tournament held in Järvenpää, Kerava, and Vierumäki, Finland. It was the 21st edition of the 4 Nations Cup.

== Results ==
=== Preliminary round ===
Pos	Team	Pld	W	OTW	OTL	L	GF	GA	GD	Pts	Qualification
1	Canada	3	3	0	0	0	9	3	+6	9	Advance to Gold medal game
2	United States	3	2	0	0	1	12	3	+9	6	Advance to Gold medal game
3	Finland (H)	3	1	0	0	2	2	8	−6	3	Advance to Bronze medal game
4	Sweden	3	0	0	0	3	2	11	−9	0	Advance to Bronze medal game

Source: Hockey Canada
Rules for classification: 1) points; 2) head-to-head points; 3) head-to-head goal difference; 4) head-to-head number of goals scored; 5) result against closest best-ranked team outside tied teams; 6) result against second-best ranked team outside tied teams; 7) seeding before tournament.
(H) Host

1 November 2016	Sweden	0–6	United States	Vierumäki Ice Arena, Vierumäki

1 November 2016	Finland	0–3	Canada	Järvenpää Arena, Järvenpää

2 November 2016	Canada	3–1	Sweden	Vierumäki Ice Arena, Vierumäki

2 November 2016	Finland	0–4	United States	Keravan jäähalli, Kerava

4 November 2016	Finland	2–1	Sweden	Vierumäki Ice Arena, Vierumäki

4 November 2016	United States	2–3	Canada	Vierumäki Ice Arena, Vierumäki

=== Bronze medal game ===
5 November 2016	Finland	2–1	Sweden	Järvenpää Arena, Järvenpää

=== Gold medal game ===
5 November 2016	Canada	3–5	United States	Järvenpää Arena, Järvenpää

== Statistics ==
=== Final standings ===
Gold medal	United States
Silver medal	Canada
Bronze medal	Finland
4	Sweden
