= 2006–07 Harvard Crimson women's ice hockey season =

NCAA Tournament, Lost Quarterfinals
- Conference: ECAC
- Home ice: Bright Hockey Center

Rankings
- USA Today/USA Hockey Magazine: 6
- USCHO.com/CBS College Sports: 6

Record

Coaches and captains
- Head coach: Katey Stone

The 2006–07 Harvard Crimson women's ice hockey team represented Harvard University. The Crimson had 23 wins, compared to 8 losses and 2 ties. In the ECAC, the Crimson were 17-4-1. Nationally, the Crimson were ranked sixth. Harvard qualified for the NCAA tournament but lost in the opening round. Julie Chu was honoured with the Patty Kazmaier Award.

== Player stats ==
Note: GP= Games played; G= Goals; A= Assists; PTS = Points; GW = Game Winning Goals; PPL = Power Play Goals; SHG = Short Handed Goals

Player	GP	G	A	Pts	GW	PPL	SHG
Julie Chu	30	18	48	66	1	6	0
Sarah Vaillancourt	29	30	26	56	4	14	0
Jenny Brine	33	23	16	39	8	16	0
Sarah Wilson	32	12	17	29	3	3	0
Caitlin Cahow	30	8	20	28	2	5	0
Katie Johnston	33	11	15	26	2	3	1
Jennifer Sifers	33	9	13	22	0	6	0
Liza Solley	33	8	9	17	2	2	0
Cori Bassett	31	2	15	17	0	1	0
Kati Vaughn	30	2	13	15	0	1	0
Lindsay Weaver	33	3	11	14	0	2	0
Kathryn Farni	32	2	8	10	0	0	0
Randi Griffin	26	3	5	8	0	1	0
Laura Brady	25	2	2	4	0	0	0
Kirsten Kester	30	1	1	2	0	0	0
Jen Brawn	9	1	1	2	0	0	0
Brenna McLean	32	1	1	2	0	0	0
Nora Sluzas	32	1	0	1	0	0	0
Amy Uber	14	1	0	1	1	0	0
Lauren Herrington	7	0	1	1	0	0	0
Jessica MacKenzie	23	0	1	1	0	0	0
Adrienne Bernakevitch	2	0	0	0	0	0	0
Jodi Krakower	12	0	0	0	0	0	0
Kristin Toretta	2	0	0	0	0	0	0
Brittany Martin	22	0	0	0	0	0	0
Christina Kessler	12	0	0	0	0	0	0

== Postseason ==
In the opening round, the Crimson were bested by the eventual national champion Wisconsin Badgers. The Crimson valiantly played in a four-overtime match.

== Awards and honors ==
- Caitlin Cahow, 2006-07 ECAC Coaches Preseason All-League Selection
- Juile Chu, 2006-07 ECAC Coaches Preseason All-League Selection
- Juile Chu, 2006-07 ECAC Media Preseason All-League Selection
- Julie Chu, Patty Kazmaier Award
