= 2017 4 Nations Cup =

Tournament details
- Host country: United States
- Venues: 2 (in 2 host cities)
- Dates: 7–12 November
- Teams: 4

Final positions
- Champions: United States (8th title)
- Runners-up: Canada
- Third place: Finland
- Fourth place: Sweden

Tournament statistics
- Games played: 8
- Goals scored: 47 (5.88 per game)
- Scoring leader(s): (United States) Kendall Coyne (Canada) Marie-Philip Poulin (7 points)

The 2017 4 Nations Cup was a women's ice hockey tournament held in Tampa and Wesley Chapel, Florida, United States. It was the 22nd edition of the 4 Nations Cup.

== Results ==
=== Preliminary round ===
Pos	Team	Pld	W	OTW	OTL	L	GF	GA	GD	Pts	Qualification
1	United States (H)	3	3	0	0	0	17	4	+13	9	Advance to Gold medal game
2	Canada	3	2	0	0	1	15	4	+11	6	Advance to Gold medal game
3	Finland	3	1	0	0	2	5	13	−8	3	Advance to Bronze medal game
4	Sweden	3	0	0	0	3	1	17	−16	0	Advance to Bronze medal game

Source: USA Hockey
Rules for classification: 1) points; 2) head-to-head points; 3) head-to-head goal difference; 4) head-to-head number of goals scored; 5) result against closest best-ranked team outside tied teams; 6) result against second-best ranked team outside tied teams; 7) seeding before tournament.
(H) Host

All times are local (UTC−5).

7 November 2017; 15:30	Sweden	0–9	Canada	Florida Hospital Center Ice, Wesley Chapel

Game reference
Referees: (United States) Jamie Huntley-Park (Finland) Kaisa Ketonen; Linesmen: (United States) Jessica Leclerc (United States) Jodi Price

7 November 2017; 19:00	Finland	2–8	United States	Florida Hospital Center Ice, Wesley Chapel

Game reference
Referees: (Slovakia) Nikoleta Celárová (United States) Chelsea Rapin; Linesmen: (United States) Jamie Arola (United States) Jackie Spresser

8 November 2017; 15:30	Sweden	1–3	Finland	Florida Hospital Center Ice, Wesley Chapel

Game reference
Referees: (United States) Jamie Huntley-Park (United States) Melissa Szkola; Linesmen: (United States) Jamie Arola (United States) Kendall Hanley

8 November 2017; 19:00	Canada	2–4	United States	Florida Hospital Center Ice, Wesley Chapel

Game reference
Referees: (Slovakia) Nikoleta Celárová (Finland) Kaisa Ketonen; Linesmen: (United States) Jessica Leclerc (United States) Jackie Spresser

10 November 2017; 15:00	Canada	4–0	Finland	Florida Hospital Center Ice, Wesley Chapel

Game reference
Referees: (Slovakia) Nikoleta Celárová (United States) Chelsea Rapin; Linesmen: (United States) Kendall Hanley (United States) Jackie Spresser

10 November 2017; 18:30	Sweden	0–5	United States	Florida Hospital Center Ice, Wesley Chapel

Game reference
Referees: (Finland) Kaisa Ketonen (United States) Melissa Szkola; Linesmen: (United States) Jamie Arola (United States) Jodi Price

=== Bronze medal game ===
12 November 2017; 12:00	Sweden	1–2 OT (0–1, 1–0, 0–0) (OT 0–1)	Finland	Amalie Arena, Tampa

Game reference

Sara Grahn
Goalies
Meeri Räisänen

	0–1	19:43 – Hiirikoski (Tapani)
Grahm (Winberg) (PP) – 30:58	1–1
	1–2	64:51 – Nieminen (Välimäki, Hiirikoski) (PP)

8 min
Penalties
16 min
28
Shots
35

=== Gold medal game ===
12 November 2017; 15:30	Canada	1–5 (0–0, 0–2, 1–3)	United States	Amalie Arena, Tampa; Attendance: 3,641

Game reference

Geneviève Lacasse
Goalies
Maddie Rooney

	0–1	35:06 – Brandt (Cameranesi, Bellamy)
	0–2	36:49 – Brandt (Cameranesi, Kessel) (PP)
Agosta (Lacquette, Irwin) (PP) – 50:42	1–2
	1–3	56:19 – Knight (Coyne, Bellamy) (PP)
	1–4	58:53 – Kessel (Pfalzer, Cameranesi) (PP)
	1–5	59:43 – Coyne (Knight, Cameranesi)

16 min
Penalties
8 min
19
Shots
24

== Statistics ==
=== Final standings ===
Gold medal	United States
Silver medal	Canada
Bronze medal	Finland
4	Sweden

=== Scoring leaders ===
Only the top ten skaters, sorted by points, then goals, are included in this list.

Player	GP	G	A	Pts	PIM	POS
(United States) Kendall Coyne	4	4	3	7	2	F
(Canada) Marie-Philip Poulin	4	2	5	7	6	F
(Canada) Meghan Agosta	4	4	2	6	0	F
(United States) Emily Pfalzer	4	3	3	6	0	D
(United States) Dani Cameranesi	4	1	5	6	0	F
(Canada) Brigette Lacquette	3	0	6	6	2	D
(Canada) Jenn Wakefield	3	4	1	5	4	F
(United States) Hannah Brandt	4	3	2	5	2	F
(United States) Hilary Knight	4	2	2	4	2	F
(United States) Amanda Kessel	4	2	2	4	0	F

GP = Games played; G = Goals; A = Assists; Pts = Points; PIM = Penalties in minutes; POS = Position
Source: USA Hockey

==== Goaltending leaders ====
Only the top four goaltenders, based on save percentage, who played at least 40% of their team's minutes, are included in this list.

Player	TOI	GA	GAA	SA	Sv%	SO
(Sweden) Sara Grahn	124:51	7	3.36	79	.911	0
(United States) Maddie Rooney	180:00	5	1.67	54	.907	0
(Canada) Geneviève Lacasse	180:00	5	1.67	44	.886	2
(Finland) Eveliina Suonpää	103:15	5	2.91	39	.872	0

TOI = Time on Ice (minutes:seconds); SA = Shots against; GA = Goals against; GAA = Goals against average; Sv% = Save percentage; SO = Shutouts
Source: USA Hockey
