= 2007–08 Harvard Crimson women's ice hockey season =

American college ice hockey team season

The 2007–08 Harvard Crimson women's ice hockey team represented Harvard University. In the ECAC. the Crimson were undefeated. The squad went 22-0-0 and were the second team in ECAC women’s hockey history to finish the conference season undefeated. Titles for the Crimson women’s ice hockey team included the Beanpot, Ivy League, ECAC regular-season and ECAC tournament titles. The Crimson participated in the 2008 Frozen Four.

== Player stats ==
Note: GP= Games played; G= Goals; A= Assists; PTS = Points; PIM = Penalties in Minutes; GW = Game Winning Goals; PPL = Power Play Goals; SHG = Short Handed Goals

Player	GP	G	A	Pts	PIM	GW	PPL	SHG
Sarah Vaillancourt	33	25	34	59	32	6	6	3
Jenny Brine	33	20	22	42	18	3	12	0
Caitlin Cahow	33	14	22	36	40	6	11	0
Sarah Wilson	33	14	13	27	0	2	6	0
Liza Ryabkina	33	10	16	26	28	3	2	0
Katharine Chute	33	8	10	18	8	4	1	0
Kate Buesser	33	6	10	16	14	3	3	0
Anna McDonald	32	7	8	15	25	1	0	1
Kati Vaughn	33	3	12	15	18	1	3	0
Kathryn Farni	32	2	5	7	26	0	1	0
Cori Bassett	33	2	3	5	16	0	1	0
Leanna Coskren	33	0	5	5	27	0	0	0
Randi Griffin	33	4	0	4	12	1	0	0
Deborah Conway	32	1	3	4	6	1	0	0
Jen Brawn	25	1	0	1	0	0	0	0
Christina Kessler	31	0	1	1	2	0	0	0
Brenna McLean	33	0	0	0	2	0	0	0
Laura Brady	1	0	0	0	2	0	0	0
Kylie Stephens	2	0	0	0	0	0	0	0
Kirsten Kester	33	0	0	0	0	0	0	0
Brittany Martin	1	0	0	0	0	0	0	0
Nora Sluzas	25	0	0	0	14	0	0	0
Jessica MacKenzie	5	0	0	0	0	0	0	0
Ashley Wheeler	4	0	0	0	2	0	0	0

== 2008 ECAC Tournament ==
Round	Opponent	Score
Quarterfinal	# 8 Cornell	3-2
Quarterfinal	# 8 Cornell	4-2
Semifinal	# 4 Clarkson	3-0
Final	# 2 St. Lawrence	3-2 (OT)

== Awards and honors ==
- Caitlin Cahow, 2008 ECAC Tournament Most Valuable Player,
- Sarah Vaillancourt, Patty Kazmaier Award
- Katey Stone, ECAC Hockey Coach of the Year
