= 1999 3 Nations Cup =

Tournament details
- Host country: Canada
- Venues: 2 (in 2 host cities)
- Dates: November 28–December 5
- Teams: 3

Final positions
- Champions: Canada (3rd title)
- Runners-up: United States
- Third place: Finland

Tournament statistics
- Games played: 7
- Goals scored: 45 (6.43 per game)
- Scoring leader: (Canada) Hayley Wickenheiser (9 points)

The 1999 3 Nations Cup was the fourth playing of the annual women's ice hockey tournament. It was held in Montreal and Sherbrooke, Quebec, from November 28 until December 5, 1999.

== Results ==
=== Preliminary round ===
Pos	Team	Pld	W	L	T	GF	GA	GD	Pts	Qualification
1	Canada (H)	4	4	0	0	18	9	+9	8	Advance to Gold medal game
2	United States	4	2	2	0	13	13	0	4	Advance to Gold medal game
3	Finland	4	0	4	0	9	16	−7	0	

Source: Hockey Canada
(H) Hosts

28 November	Canada	3–1	United States	Sherbrooke

29 November	United States	3–2	Finland	Sherbrooke

1 December	Canada	6-3	Finland	Sherbrooke

2 December	Canada	5–4	United States	Montreal

3 December	United States	5–3	Finland	Montreal

4 December	Canada	4–1	Finland	Montreal

=== Gold medal game ===
5 December	Canada	3–2	United States

== Statistics ==
=== Final standings ===
1st place, gold medalist(s)	Canada
2nd place, silver medalist(s)	United States
3rd place, bronze medalist(s)	Finland
