= 4 Nations Cup =

Annual international women's ice hockey tournament

The 4 Nations Cup is an annual women's ice hockey tournament, held between four major national teams in the sport; currently, these are Canada, the United States, Sweden and Finland. Until 2000, when Sweden joined, the tournament was the 3 Nations Cup. In general, it is held in or around November each year.

== History ==
The 3 Nations Cup was first held in 1996. Sweden joined the tourney in 2000, but the USA did not attend the 2001 event due to the September 11 attacks; the 4 Nations roster has been constant since 2002.

The format of the tournament is a single round-robin, with each team playing one game against each of the others. The top two teams advance to the gold-medal game. The last two teams play for bronze. When it was the 3 Nations Cup, the third place team was simply awarded bronze. Team Canada has won 14 gold medals since the 4 Nations Cup creation in 1996 and Team USA has won 9 gold medals.

=== Medal table ===
Country	(gold) Gold	(silver) Silver	(bronze) Bronze	Medals
Canada	14	9	0	23
United States	9	12	1	22
Finland	0	2	14	16
Sweden	0	0	8	8
Total	23	23	23	69

=== Tournaments ===
Key

- (#) Number of tournaments (or 2nd, 3rd, or 4th places) won at the time.

Year	(gold) Gold	(silver) Silver	(bronze) Bronze	Fourth	Host city (cities)	Host country (countries)
1996	Canada (1)	United States (1)	Finland (1)	—	Ottawa, Cornwall, Kingston, and Smiths Falls, Ontario; Canton, New York	Canada; United States
1997	United States (1)	Canada (1)	Finland (2)	—	Lake Placid, Saratoga Springs, New York and Burlington, Vermont; Ottawa and Belleville, Ontario	United States; Canada
1998	Canada (2)	United States (2)	Finland (3)	—	Kuortane	Finland
1999	Canada (3)	United States (3)	Finland (4)	—	Montreal and Sherbrooke	Canada
2000	Canada (4)	United States (4)	Finland (5)	Sweden (1)	Provo, Utah	United States
2001	Canada (5)	Finland (1)	Sweden (1)	—	Hämeenlinna, Mikkeli, Tampere, and Vierumäki	Finland
2002	Canada (6)	United States (5)	Finland (6)	Sweden (2)	Kitchener and Mississauga	Canada
2003	United States (2)	Canada (2)	Finland (7)	Sweden (3)	Skövde	Sweden
2004	Canada (7)	United States (6)	Sweden (2)	Finland (1)	Lake Placid, New York and Burlington, Vermont	United States
2005	Canada (8)	United States (7)	Finland (8)	Sweden (4)	Hämeenlinna, Salo, and Tampere	Finland
2006	Canada (9)	United States (8)	Sweden (3)	Finland (2)	Kitchener	Canada
2007	Canada (10)	United States (9)	Finland (9)	Sweden (5)	Leksand	Sweden
2008	United States (3)	Canada (3)	Sweden (4)	Finland (3)	Lake Placid	United States
2009	Canada (11)	United States (10)	Sweden (5)	Finland (4)	Kerava, Helsinki, Mikkeli, Tikkurila, and Vierumäki	Finland
2010	Canada (12)	United States (11)	Finland (10)	Sweden (6)	Clarenville and St. John's	Canada
2011	United States (4)	Canada (4)	Sweden (6)	Finland (5)	Nyköping	Sweden
2012	United States (5)	Canada (5)	Sweden (7)	Finland (6)	Kerava and Tikkurila	Finland
2013	Canada (13)	Finland (2)	United States (1)	Sweden (7)	Lake Placid	United States
2014	Canada (14)	United States (12)	Sweden (8)	Finland (7)	Kamloops	Canada
2015	United States (6)	Canada (6)	Finland (11)	Sweden (8)	Sundsvall Municipality	Sweden
2016	United States (7)	Canada (7)	Finland (12)	Sweden (9)	Järvenpää, Kerava, and Vierumäki	Finland
2017	United States (8)	Canada (8)	Finland (13)	Sweden (10)	Tampa	United States
2018	United States (9)	Canada (9)	Finland (14)	Sweden (11)	Saskatoon	Canada
2019	Cancelled Due to Contract Disputes between Swedish Ice Hockey Association and Swedish Women's Team				Luleå	Sweden
2020	Not scheduled due to COVID-19 pandemic					Finland/Sweden

== Year by Year ==
=== 2006 ===
The Tournament takes place in Kitchener, Ontario, Canada from 7 to 11 November 2006.

First Round

- Sweden 8–3 Finland
- Canada 3–0 USA
- USA 5–2 Finland
- Canada 7–0 Sweden
- USA 7–0 Sweden
- Canada 8-1 Finland

Standing

1. Canada, 8 points
2. United States, 4 points
3. Sweden, 4 points
4. Finland, 0points

Game for 3rd place

- Sweden 3–2 Finland

Game for the First place

- Canada 5–2 USA

=== 2007 ===
The tournament takes place November 7 to 11 on the ice rink of Ejendals Arena in Sweden.

Wednesday November 7, 2007

- Canada 4 – 1 Finland
- Sweden 0 – 4 USA

Thursday November 8, 2007

- Canada 6 – 3 United States
- Sweden 0 – 3 Finland

Saturday November 10, 2007

- Finland 1 – 2 United States
- Sweden 3 – 5 Canada

Standing

1. Canada, 6 points.
2. United States, 4 points
3. Finland, 2 points
4. Sweden, 0 point

Sunday November 11, 2007

Game for the 3rd place
Finland 1 – 0 Sweden

Game for the first place
United States 0 – 2 Canada

=== 2008 ===
The tournament took place in November at Lake Placid USA.

First round

Tuesday November 4, 2008

- Canada 6–0 Finland
- United States 5–2 Sweden

Wednesday November 5, 2008

- Sweden 2–3 Finland

Thursday November 6, 2008

- United States 2–4 Canada

Friday November 7, 2008

- Canada 1–2 Sweden (after overtime period)
- USA 4–1 Finland

Standing

1. Canada, 5 points
2. United States, 4 points
3. Finland, 2 points
4. Sweden, 2 points

Saturday November 9, 2008

Game for 3rd place

- Sweden 1–0 Finland

Game for first place

- USA 3–2 Canada after overtime period

Game was tied 2-2 after regulation and extra time. Erica McKenzie scored the game-winning goal for the United States team in the shootout.

=== 2009 ===
November 3, 4, 6 and 7 at Vierumäki in Finland.

First round

- Tuesday November 3, 2009

Finland 0 - 4 United States
Sweden 0 - 4 Canada

- Wednesday November 4, 2009

Finland 2 - 4 Canada
United States 3 - 2 Sweden

- Friday November 6, 2009

Finland 1 - 2 Sweden (extra-time)
Canada 2 - 3 United States

Standing

1. United States, 6 points
2. Canada, 4 points
3. Sweden, 2 points
4. Finland, 0 point
- Saturday November 7, 2009

Game for 3rd place
Finland 1 - 2 Sweden (Extra-time)

Game for the First place

- Canada 5–2 United Stades.

=== 2010 ===
The tournament takes place from November 9 to the 13th in Clarenville, Newfoundland and St. John's, Newfoundland (Canada).

First round

Tuesday November 9, 2010

- Finland 3–0 Sweden
- USA 3–2 Canada (in Shootout).

Wednesday November 10, 2010

- Canada 8–1 Sweden
- USA 4–0 Finland.

Friday November 12, 2010

- Canada 15–0 Finland
- USA 4–0 Sweden. Goaltender Jessie Vetter makes 20 stops to earn the shutout.

Standing
1-USA, 6 points
2-Canada, 4 points
3-Finland, 2 points
4-Sweden, 0 points

Saturday November 13th 2010
Game for 3rd place

- Finland 2–1 Sweden

Game for the First place

- Canada 3–2 USA.

Rebecca Johnston's goal in extra time period.

=== 2011 ===
The tournament took place from November 9–14, 2011 to Nyköping in Sweden. The competition sets four powers of the Women's ice hockey, Canada, the United States Finland and Sweden. All the matches are played Stora Hallen arena.

First round

- Wednesday November 9, 2011

Canada 5 - 0 Finland
Sweden 0 - 8 United States

- Thursday November 10, 2011

Canada 3 -1 United States
Sweden 1 - 2 Finland

- Saturday November 12, 2011

Sweden 1 - 3 Canada
Finland 0 - 10 United States

Standing

1. Canada, 6 points
2. United States, 4 points
3. Finland, 2 points
4. Sweden, 0
- Sunday November 13, 2011

Game for 3rd place
Sweden 2 - 1 Finland

Game for the First place
United States 4 - 3 Canada.

After being tied 3–3 at the end of regulation and overtime, a shootout determined the winner. The United States' Goaltender Jessie Vetter gave the Americans the victory by stopping Canada's Hayley Wickenheiser.
