= 2009 4 Nations Cup =

Tournament details
- Host country: Finland
- Venues: 5 (in 5 host cities)
- Dates: 3–7 November
- Teams: 4

Final positions
- Champions: Canada (11th title)
- Runners-up: United States
- Third place: Sweden
- Fourth place: Finland

Tournament statistics
- Games played: 8
- Goals scored: 36 (4.5 per game)

The 2009 4 Nations Cup was the 14th playing of the annual women's ice hockey tournament. It was held in cities around Finland, from November 3–7, 2009.

== Results ==
=== Preliminary round ===
Pos	Team	Pld	W	OTW	OTL	L	GF	GA	GD	Pts
1	United States	3	3	0	0	0	10	4	+6	9
2	Canada	3	2	0	0	1	10	5	+5	6
3	Sweden	3	0	1	0	2	4	8	−4	2
4	Finland	3	0	0	1	2	3	10	−7	1

3 November	United States	4–0	Finland	Mikkeli

3 November	Canada	4–0	Sweden	Vierumaki

4 November	Canada	4–2	Finland	Kerava

4 November	United States	3–2	Sweden	Vierumaki

5 November	Sweden	2–1	Finland	Helsinki

5 November	United States	3–2	Canada	Vierumaki

=== Bronze medal game ===
7 November	Sweden	2–1	Finland	Tikkurila

=== Gold medal game ===
7 November	Canada	5–1	United States	Tikkurila
