= 2002 4 Nations Cup =

The 2002 4 Nations Cup was the seventh playing of the annual women's ice hockey tournament. It was held in Kitchener and Mississauga, Ontario, from November 6–10, 2002.

== Results ==
6 November	Finland	2–2	Sweden	Kitchener

6 November	Canada	7–0	United States	Kitchener

7 November	United States	3-1	Finland	Kitchener

7 November	Canada	5–1	Sweden	Mississauga

9 November	United States	12–2	Sweden	Kitchener

9 November	Canada	3–1	Finland	Kitchener

=== Final Table ===
Rank	Team	GP	W	T	L	GF	GA	Pts
1	Canada	3	3	0	0	15	2	6
2	United States	3	2	0	1	15	10	4
3	Finland	3	0	1	2	4	8	1
4	Sweden	3	0	1	2	5	19	1

== Final ==
10 November	Canada	4–2	United States	Kitchener

== 3rd place ==
10 November	Finland	5–0	Sweden	Kitchener
