= 2000 4 Nations Cup =

The 2000 4 Nations Cup was the fifth playing of the annual women's ice hockey tournament. It was held in Provo, Utah, from November 7–11, 2000. As Sweden joined the tournament, it became the 4 Nations Cup.

== Results ==
7 November	Canada	9–0	Sweden	Provo

7 November	United States	9–1	Finland	Provo

8 November	Sweden	2-2	Finland	Provo

8 November	United States	4–1	Canada	Provo

10 November	United States	10–2	Sweden	Provo

10 November	Canada	8–2	Finland	Provo

=== Final Table ===
Rank	Team	GP	W	T	L	GF	GA	Pts
1	United States	3	3	0	0	23	4	6
2	Canada	3	2	0	1	18	6	4
3	Finland	3	0	1	2	5	19	1
4	Sweden	3	0	1	2	4	21	1

== Final ==
11 November	Canada	2–0	United States	Provo

== 3rd place ==
11 November	Finland	6–0	Sweden	Provo
