= Canada women's national ice hockey team =

Women's national ice hockey team representing Canada

Canada
- The Maple Leaf has always appeared on the Team Canada women's uniform since the team was established in 1990.
- Nickname: Team Canada (Équipe Canada)
- Association: Hockey Canada
- General manager: Danièle Sauvageau
- Head coach: Kori Cheverie
- Assistants: Bruce Cassidy; Alo Domenico; Caroline Ouellette; Kris Sparre
- Captain: Laura Stacey
- Most games: Hayley Wickenheiser (276)
- Top scorer: Hayley Wickenheiser (168)
- Most points: Hayley Wickenheiser (379)
- Team colours: Red, black, white
- IIHF code: CAN
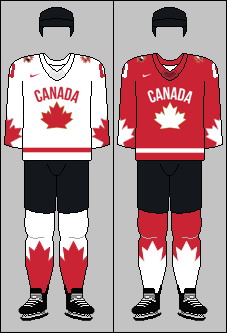

Ranking
- Current IIHF: 2 (3 June 2026)
- Highest IIHF: 1 (first in 2003)
- Lowest IIHF: 2 (first in 2009)

First international
- Canada 10–0 Switzerland (North York, Canada; April 21, 1987)

Biggest win
- Canada 19–1 Netherlands (North York, Canada; April 23, 1987); Canada 18–0 Japan (Ottawa, Canada; March 22, 1990); Canada 18–0 Japan (Richmond, Canada; April 5, 1996); Canada 18–0 Slovakia (Vancouver, Canada; February 13, 2010)

Biggest defeat
- United States 9–2 Canada (Burlington, United States; April 7, 2012)

Olympics
- Appearances: 8 (first in 1998)
- Medals: Gold: 5 (2002, 2006, 2010, 2014, 2022); Silver: 3 (1998, 2018, 2026)

World Championships
- Appearances: 25 (first in 1990)
- Best result: (gold) Gold: 13 (1990, 1992, 1994, 1997, 1999, 2000, 2001, 2004, 2007, 2012, 2021, 2022, 2024)

International record (W–L–T)
- 363–84–3

Medal record

Olympic Games
Gold medal – first place	2002 Salt Lake City	Team
Gold medal – first place	2006 Torino	Team
Gold medal – first place	2010 Vancouver	Team
Gold medal – first place	2014 Sochi	Team
Gold medal – first place	2022 Beijing	Team
Silver medal – second place	1998 Nagano	Team
Silver medal – second place	2018 Pyeongchang	Team
Silver medal – second place	2026 Milano Cortina	Team

World Championships
Gold medal – first place	1990 Canada	
Gold medal – first place	1992 Finland	
Gold medal – first place	1994 United States	
Gold medal – first place	1997 Canada	
Gold medal – first place	1999 Finland	
Gold medal – first place	2000 Canada	
Gold medal – first place	2001 USA	
Gold medal – first place	2004 Canada	
Gold medal – first place	2007 Canada	
Gold medal – first place	2012 United States	
Gold medal – first place	2021 Canada	
Gold medal – first place	2022 Denmark	
Gold medal – first place	2024 United States	
Silver medal – second place	2005 Sweden	
Silver medal – second place	2008 China	
Silver medal – second place	2009 Finland	
Silver medal – second place	2011 Switzerland	
Silver medal – second place	2013 Canada	
Silver medal – second place	2015 Sweden	
Silver medal – second place	2016 Canada	
Silver medal – second place	2017 United States	
Silver medal – second place	2023 Canada	
Silver medal – second place	2025 Czechia	
Silver medal – second place	2026 Denmark	
Bronze medal – third place	2019 Finland	

Winter Universiade
Gold medal – first place	2009 Harbin	
Gold medal – first place	2011 Erzurum	Team
Gold medal – first place	2013 Trentino	Team
Gold medal – first place	2023 Lake Placid	Team
Silver medal – second place	2015 Granada	Team
Silver medal – second place	2017 Almaty	Team
Silver medal – second place	2019 Krasnoyarsk	Team

The Canadian women's national ice hockey team is the ice hockey team representing Canada in women's hockey. The team is overseen by Hockey Canada, a member of the International Ice Hockey Federation and participates in international competitions. Canada has been a dominant figure in international competition, having won the majority of major ice hockey tournaments. Canada is rivaled by the United States, the only other winner of a major tournament.

== Competitive record ==
Champions Runners-up Third place Fourth place Tournament played fully or partially on home soil:

=== Olympic Games ===
Olympic Games record
Year	Round	Position	Pld	W	D	L	GF	GA	Squad
(Japan) 1998	Silver medal	2nd	6	4	0	2	29	15	Squad
(United States) 2002	Gold medal	1st	5	5	0	0	35	5	Squad
(Italy) 2006	Gold medal	1st	5	5	0	0	46	2	Squad
(Canada) 2010	Gold medal	1st	5	5	—N/a	0	48	2	Squad
(Russia) 2014	Gold medal	1st	5	5	—N/a	0	17	5	Squad
(South Korea) 2018	Silver medal	2nd	5	4	—N/a	1	18	5	Squad
(China) 2022	Gold medal	1st	7	7	—N/a	0	57	10	Squad
(Italy) 2026	Silver medal	2nd	7	5	—N/a	2	22	10	Squad
Total	5 Gold medals	8/8	45	40	0	5	272	54	—N/a

=== Women's World Championship ===
Women's World Championship record
Year	Round	Position	Pld	W	D	L	GF	GA	Squad
(Canada) 1990	Champions	1st	5	5	0	0	61	8	Squad
(Finland) 1992	Champions	1st	5	5	0	0			Squad
(United States) 1994	Champions	1st	5	5	0	0			Squad
(Canada) 1997	Champions	1st	5	5	0	0			Squad
(Finland) 1999	Champions	1st	5	5	0	0	31	2	Squad
(Canada) 2000	Champions	1st	5	5	0	0			Squad
(United States) 2001	Champions	1st	5	5	0	0			Squad
(China) 2003	Competition at top level was cancelled due to SARS outbreak in China								
(Canada) 2004	Champions	1st	5	4	0	1			Squad
(Sweden) 2005	Runners-up	2nd	5	4	0	1			Squad
(Canada) 2007	Champions	1st	5	5	—N/a	0			Squad
(China) 2008	Runners-up	2nd	5	3	—N/a	2			Squad
(Finland) 2009	Runners-up	2nd	5	4	—N/a	1			Squad
(Switzerland) 2011	Runners-up	2nd	5	4	—N/a	1			Squad
(United States) 2012	Champions	1st	5	4	—N/a	1			Squad
(Canada) 2013	Runners-up	2nd	5	4	—N/a	1			Squad
(Sweden) 2015	Runners-up	2nd	5	3	—N/a	2			Squad
(Canada) 2016	Runners-up	2nd	5	3	—N/a	2			Squad
(United States) 2017	Runners-up	2nd	5	2	—N/a	3			Squad
(Finland) 2019	Third place	3rd	7	5	—N/a	2	33	9	Squad
(Canada) 2021	Champions	1st	7	7	—N/a	0	34	7	Squad
(Denmark) 2022	Champions	1st	7	6	—N/a	1	32	9	Squad
(Canada) 2023	Runners-up	2nd	7	6	—N/a	1	29	13	Squad
(United States) 2024	Champions	1st	7	6	—N/a	1	27	8	Squad
(Czech Republic) 2025	Runners-up	2nd	7	5	—N/a	2	37	9	Squad
(Denmark) 2026	Runners-up	2nd	7	6	—N/a	1	34	9	Squad
Total	13 Titles	25/25	139	110	0	19	798	165	—N/a

=== 4 Nations Cup ===
Year	Location	Result
1996	Ottawa, Ontario, Canada	Champions
1997	Lake Placid, United States	Runners-up
1998	Kuortane, Finland	Champions
1999	Montreal, Quebec, Canada	Champions
2000	Provo, United States	Champions
2001	Vierumäki and Tampere, Finland	Champions
2002	Kitchener, Ontario, Canada	Champions
2003	Skövde, Sweden	Runners-up
2004	Lake Placid, United States	Champions
2005	Hämeenlinna, Finland	Champions
2006	Kitchener, Ontario, Canada	Champions
2007	Leksand, Sweden	Champions
2008	Lake Placid, United States	Runners-up
2009	Vierumäki, Finland	Champions
2010	Clarenville and St. John's, Newfoundland and Labrador, Canada	Champions
2011	Nyköping, Sweden	Runners-up
2012	Tikkurila, Finland	Runners-up
2013	Lake Placid, United States	Champions
2014	Kamloops, British Columbia, Canada	Champions
2015	Sundsvall, Sweden	Runners-up
2016	Järvenpää, Finland	Runners-up
2017	Tampa and Wesley Chapel, United States	Runners-up
2018	Saskatoon, Saskatchewan, Canada	Runners-up
2019	Luleå, Sweden	Cancelled
2020	Finland/Sweden	Not Scheduled

=== Women's Pacific Rim Championship ===
Women's Pacific Rim Championship record
Year	Round	Position	Pld	W	D	L	GF	GA	Squad
(United States) 1995	Gold medal	1st	5	4	0	1			Squad
(Canada) 1996	Gold medal	1st	5	5	0	0			Squad
Total	2 Gold medals	2/2	10						—N/a

== Team ==
=== Current roster ===
Roster for the 2026 IIHF Women's World Championship.

Head Coach: Kori Cheverie

No.	Pos.	Name	Height	Weight	Birthdate	Team
2	D	Sophie Jaques	1.72 m (5 ft 8 in)	81 kg (179 lb)	16 October 2000 (age 26)	(Canada) Vancouver Goldeneyes
4	D	Kati Tabin	1.70 m (5 ft 7 in)	70 kg (150 lb)	21 April 1997 (age 29)	(Canada) Montreal Victoire
5	D	Kendall Cooper	1.75 m (5 ft 9 in)	74 kg (163 lb)	19 May 2002 (age 24)	(United States) Vegas Vanguards
7	F	Laura Stacey – C	1.80 m (5 ft 11 in)	70 kg (150 lb)	5 May 1994 (age 32)	(Canada) Montreal Victoire
8	D	Chloe Primerano	1.72 m (5 ft 8 in)	74 kg (163 lb)	2 January 2007 (age 19)	(United States) Minnesota Golden Gophers
9	F	Jessie Eldridge	1.76 m (5 ft 9 in)	79 kg (174 lb)	17 December 1997 (age 28)	(Canada) Montreal Victoire
10	F	Sarah Fillier	1.68 m (5 ft 6 in)	74 kg (163 lb)	9 June 2000 (age 26)	(United States) New York Sirens
11	F	Caitlin Kraemer	1.79 m (5 ft 10 in)	76 kg (168 lb)	29 May 2006 (age 20)	(United States) Minnesota Duluth Bulldogs
13	F	Sara Manness	1.77 m (5 ft 10 in)	74 kg (163 lb)	26 September 2007 (age 19)	(United States) Clarkson Golden Knights
14	D	Renata Fast – C	1.70 m (5 ft 7 in)	70 kg (150 lb)	6 October 1994 (age 32)	(Canada) Toronto Sceptres
16	F	Rosalie Tremblay	1.73 m (5 ft 8 in)	67 kg (148 lb)	16 September 2008 (age 18)	(United States) Wisconsin Badgers
17	D	Ella Shelton	1.73 m (5 ft 8 in)	78 kg (172 lb)	19 January 1998 (age 28)	(Canada) Toronto Sceptres
22	F	Hayley McDonald	1.79 m (5 ft 10 in)	77 kg (170 lb)	7 January 2008 (age 18)	(United States) Ohio State Buckeyes
23	D	Erin Ambrose	1.62 m (5 ft 4 in)	70 kg (150 lb)	30 April 1994 (age 32)	(United States) Vegas Vanguards
26	F	Emily Clark	1.72 m (5 ft 8 in)	70 kg (150 lb)	28 November 1995 (age 30)	(Canada) Hamilton Havoc
27	F	Emma Maltais	1.60 m (5 ft 3 in)	70 kg (150 lb)	4 November 1999 (age 27)	(Canada) Montreal Victoire
35	G	Ann-Renée Desbiens	1.76 m (5 ft 9 in)	77 kg (170 lb)	10 April 1994 (age 32)	(Canada) Montreal Victoire
37	G	Ève Gascon	1.73 m (5 ft 8 in)	80 kg (180 lb)	9 May 2003 (age 23)	(United States) Minnesota Duluth Bulldogs
43	F	Kristin O'Neill – A	1.63 m (5 ft 4 in)	60 kg (130 lb)	30 March 1998 (age 28)	(United States) San Jose Sea Lions
61	D	Nicole Gosling	1.70 m (5 ft 7 in)	78 kg (172 lb)	21 April 2002 (age 24)	(Canada) Hamilton Havoc
63	F	Sarah Wozniewicz	1.73 m (5 ft 8 in)	72 kg (159 lb)	25 August 2003 (age 23)	(Canada) Ottawa Charge
82	G	Kayle Osborne	1.72 m (5 ft 8 in)	79 kg (174 lb)	28 February 2002 (age 24)	(Canada) Hamilton Havoc
91	F	Rebecca Leslie	1.67 m (5 ft 6 in)	63 kg (139 lb)	8 May 1996 (age 30)	(Canada) Ottawa Charge
92	F	Danielle Serdachny	1.76 m (5 ft 9 in)	72 kg (159 lb)	12 May 2001 (age 25)	(United States) Seattle Torrent
95	F	Daryl Watts	1.68 m (5 ft 6 in)	68 kg (150 lb)	15 May 1999 (age 27)	(United States) Detroit Clutch

=== Development team roster ===
Roster for the 2026 Collegiate Series.

Head coach: Vicky Sunohara

No.	Pos.	Name	Height	Weight	Birthdate	Team
1	G	Ève Gascon	1.7 m (5 ft 7 in)	81 kg (179 lb)	May 9, 2003 (age 23)	University of Minnesota Duluth
2	F	Hayley McDonald	1.7 m (5 ft 7 in)	69 kg (152 lb)	January 7, 2008 (age 18)	Ohio State University
3	F	Sara Manness	1.75 m (5 ft 9 in)	68 kg (150 lb)	September 26, 2007 (age 19)	Clarkson University
4	F	Maxine Cimoroni	1.75 m (5 ft 9 in)	77 kg (170 lb)	February 27, 2007 (age 19)	Ohio State University
5	D	Piper Grober	1.7 m (5 ft 7 in)	61 kg (134 lb)	August 3, 2005 (age 21)	Cornell University
6	D	Rosalie Breton	1.65 m (5 ft 5 in)	64 kg (141 lb)	March 6, 2006 (age 20)	Quinnipiac University
8	D	Chloe Primerano — A	1.73 m (5 ft 8 in)	73 kg (161 lb)	January 2, 2007 (age 19)	University of Minnesota
9	F	Claire Murdoch — A	1.7 m (5 ft 7 in)	52 kg (115 lb)	October 9, 2006 (age 20)	University of Connecticut
10	F	Alexia Aubin	1.7 m (5 ft 7 in)	63 kg (139 lb)	November 26, 2005 (age 20)	Colgate University
11	F	Caitlin Kraemer	1.73 m (5 ft 8 in)	73 kg (161 lb)	May 29, 2006 (age 20)	University of Minnesota Duluth
12	F	Jocelyn Amos — C	1.7 m (5 ft 7 in)	70 kg (150 lb)	February 24, 2005 (age 21)	Ohio State University
14	F	Emma Pais — A	1.75 m (5 ft 9 in)	73 kg (161 lb)	July 11, 2005 (age 21)	Colgate University
15	D	Ava Murphy	1.75 m (5 ft 9 in)	72 kg (159 lb)	April 15, 2005 (age 21)	University of Wisconsin
16	F	Grace Outwater	1.73 m (5 ft 8 in)	68 kg (150 lb)	October 10, 2006 (age 20)	Penn State University
17	F	Abby Stonehouse	1.63 m (5 ft 4 in)	59 kg (130 lb)	March 30, 2006 (age 20)	Penn State University
19	F	Éloïse Caron	1.73 m (5 ft 8 in)	63 kg (139 lb)	May 2, 2005 (age 21)	Northeastern University
21	D	Emma Venusio	1.65 m (5 ft 5 in)	68 kg (150 lb)	September 21, 2006 (age 20)	University of Wisconsin
22	D	Makayla Watson	1.68 m (5 ft 6 in)	61 kg (134 lb)	May 22, 2006 (age 20)	Quinnipiac University
24	D	Kate Manness	1.68 m (5 ft 6 in)	58 kg (128 lb)	September 26, 2007 (age 19)	Clarkson University
26	F	Stryker Zablocki	1.68 m (5 ft 6 in)	58 kg (128 lb)	January 17, 2007 (age 19)	Northeastern University
27	F	Jordan Baxter	1.7 m (5 ft 7 in)	71 kg (157 lb)	March 14, 2005 (age 21)	Ohio State University
28	F	Rosalie Tremblay	1.7 m (5 ft 7 in)	68 kg (150 lb)	September 16, 2008 (age 18)	University of Wisconsin
29	F	Caileigh Tiller	1.73 m (5 ft 8 in)	75 kg (165 lb)	January 16, 2008 (age 18)	University of Connecticut
30	G	Mari Pietersen	1.7 m (5 ft 7 in)	74 kg (163 lb)	November 20, 2004 (age 21)	Boston University

=== Coaches ===
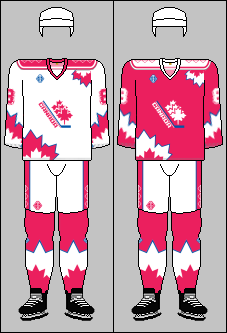
1990 women's team jerseys

- Dave McMaster, 1990
- Rick Polutnick, 1992
- Les Lawton, 1994
- Shannon Miller, 1997–1998
- Danièle Sauvageau, 1999, 2001–2002
- Melody Davidson, 2000, 2005–2007, 2009–2010
- Karen Hughes, 2004
- Peter Smith, 2008
- Ryan Walter, 2011
- Dan Church, 2012–2013
- Kevin Dineen, 2013–2014
- Doug Derraugh, 2015
- Laura Schuler, 2016–2018
- Perry Pearn, 2018–2019
- Troy Ryan, 2021–

=== General managers ===
- Melody Davidson, 2010–2018
- Gina Kingsbury, 2018–present

== See also ==
- 2009–10 Canada women's national ice hockey team
- 2010–11 Canada women's national ice hockey team
- List of Canadian women's national ice hockey team rosters
