= 2008 4 Nations Cup =

Annual women's ice hockey tournament

Official logo

The 2008 4 Nations Cup was the 13th playing of the annual women's ice hockey tournament. It was held in Lake Placid, New York, from November 4–9, 2008.

== Results ==
4 November	Canada	6–0	Finland	Lake Placid

4 November	United States	5–2	Sweden	Lake Placid

5 November	Finland	3–2	Sweden	Lake Placid

6 November	Canada	4–2	United States	Lake Placid

7 November	Sweden	2–1	Canada	Lake Placid

7 November	United States	4–1	Finland	Lake Placid

=== Final Table ===
Rank	Team	GP	W	OTW	OTL	L	GF	GA	Pts
1	Canada	3	2	0	1	0	11	4	7
2	United States	3	2	0	0	1	10	7	6
3	Finland	3	1	0	0	2	4	12	3
4	Sweden	3	0	1	0	2	7	10	2

== Final ==
9 November	United States	3–2	Canada	Lake Placid

== 3rd place ==
9 November	Sweden	3–1	Finland	Lake Placid

== Final standings ==
Gold medal	United States
Silver medal	Canada
Bronze medal	Sweden
4	Finland
