= 2005 4 Nations Cup =

Women's ice hockey tournament in Finland

The 2005 4 Nations Cup was the tenth playing of the annual women's ice hockey tournament. It was held in Finland, from August 31–September 4, 2005.

== Results ==
United States	5–2	Finland	Hameenlinna

Canada	3-1	Sweden	Hameenlinna

Canada	4-0	United States	Hameenlinna

Sweden	2–1	Finland	Salo

Canada	6–1	Finland	Tampere

United States	2–0	Sweden	Hameenlinna

=== Final Table ===
Rank	Team	GP	W	OTL	L	GF	GA	Pts
1	Canada	3	3	0	0	13	2	9
2	United States	3	2	0	1	7	6	6
3	Sweden	3	1	0	2	3	6	3
4	Finland	3	0	1	2	4	13	1

== Final ==
Canada	2–1	United States	Hameenlinna

== 3rd place ==
Finland	4–3	Sweden	Hameenlinna
