= 2001 3 Nations Cup =

The 2001 3 Nations Cup was the sixth playing of the annual women's ice hockey tournament. It was held in Finland, from November 2–7, 2001. The United States withdrew from the tournament due to the September 11 attacks.

== Results ==
2 November	Canada	5–0	Sweden	Vierumaki

3 November	Finland	4–1	Sweden	Hameenlinna

4 November	Canada	7-4	Finland	Tampere

5 November	Canada	5–1	Sweden	Vierumaki

6 November	Canada	5–2	Finland	Mikkeli

7 November	Finland	3–1	Sweden	Hameenlinna

=== Final Table ===
Rank	Team	GP	W	T	L	GF	GA	Pts
1	Canada	4	4	0	0	22	7	8
2	Finland	4	2	0	2	13	14	4
3	Sweden	4	0	0	4	3	17	0
