= 2012 4 Nations Cup =

Tournament details
- Host country: Finland
- Venues: 2 (in 2 host cities)
- Dates: 6–10 November
- Teams: 4

Final positions
- Champions: United States (5th title)
- Runners-up: Canada
- Third place: Sweden
- Fourth place: Finland

Tournament statistics
- Games played: 8
- Goals scored: 52 (6.5 per game)

The 2012 Four Nations Cup is a women's ice hockey tournament that was held in Tikkurila, Finland.

== Results ==
=== Preliminary round ===
Pos	Team	Pld	W	D	L	GF	GA	GD	Pts
1	Canada	3	3	0	0	18	1	+17	9
2	United States	3	2	0	1	20	4	+16	6
3	Finland	3	1	0	2	5	23	−18	3
4	Sweden	3	0	0	3	2	17	−15	0

6 November	United States	4-0	Sweden

6 November	Canada	6-0	Finland

7 November	Canada	3-1	United States

7 November	Finland	4-2	Sweden

9 November	Canada	9-0	Sweden

9 November	United States	15-1	Finland

=== Bronze medal game ===
10 November	Sweden	3–1	Finland

=== Gold medal game ===
10 November	United States	3–0	Canada

== See also ==
- 2013 4 Nations Cup
- 2014 4 Nations Cup
