= 2003 4 Nations Cup =

The 2003 4 Nations Cup was the eighth playing of the annual women's ice hockey tournament. It was held in Skövde, Sweden, from November 5–9, 2003.

== Results ==
| United States | 8–0 | Finland | Skövde |

| Canada | 6–1 | Sweden | Skövde |

| United States | 2–0 | Canada | Skövde |

| Sweden | 2–1 | Finland | Skövde |

| Canada | 5–1 | Finland | Skövde |

| United States | 5–1 | Sweden | Skövde |

=== Final Table ===
| Rank | Team | GP | W | T | L | GF | GA | Pts |
|---|---|---|---|---|---|---|---|---|
| 1 | United States | 3 | 3 | 0 | 0 | 15 | 1 | 6 |
| 2 | Canada | 3 | 2 | 0 | 1 | 11 | 4 | 4 |
| 3 | Sweden | 3 | 1 | 0 | 2 | 4 | 12 | 2 |
| 4 | Finland | 3 | 0 | 0 | 3 | 2 | 15 | 0 |

== Final ==
| United States | 2–1 | Canada | Skövde |

== 3rd place ==
| Finland | 3–2 | Sweden | Skövde |

== Final standings ==
| Gold medal | United States |
| Silver medal | Canada |
| Bronze medal | Finland |
| 4 | Sweden |
