= 2004 4 Nations Cup =

Tournament details
- Host country: USA
- Venues: 2 (in 2 host cities)
- Dates: 10–14 November
- Teams: 4

Final positions
- Champions: Canada (7th title)
- Runners-up: United States
- Third place: Sweden
- Fourth place: Finland

The 2004 4 Nations Cup was the ninth playing of the annual women's ice hockey tournament. It was held in Lake Placid, New York, and Burlington, Vermont, from November 10–14, 2004.

== Results ==
=== Preliminary round ===
Pos	Team	Pld	W	D	L	GF	GA	GD	Pts
1	United States	3	2	1	0	13	5	+8	5
2	Canada	3	2	1	0	8	4	+4	5
3	Sweden	3	0	1	2	7	11	−4	1
4	Finland	3	0	1	2	4	12	−8	1

All times are local (UTC−5).

November 10, 2004	United States	6–1	Finland	Verizon Sports Complex Arena, Lake Placid, New York

November 10, 2004; 16:00	Canada	3-2	Sweden	Verizon Sports Complex Arena, Lake Placid, New York

November 11, 2004; 19:00	United States	1-1	Canada	Gutterson Fieldhouse, University of Vermont, Burlington, Vermont

Sweden	2–2	Finland	Verizon Sports Complex Arena, Lake Placid, New York

November 13, 2004; 13:00	Canada	4–1	Finland	Verizon Sports Complex Arena, Lake Placid, New York

November 13, 2004	United States	6–3	Sweden	Verizon Sports Complex Arena, Lake Placid, New York

=== Bronze Medal ===
November 14, 2004; 11:30	Sweden	4–2	Finland	Verizon Sports Complex Arena, Lake Placid, New York

=== Gold Medal ===
November 14, 2004; 14:30	Canada	2–1	United States	Verizon Sports Complex Arena, Lake Placid, New York
