= 2007 4 Nations Cup =

The 2007 4 Nations Cup was held in Leksand, Sweden from November 7 to November 11, 2007. All games were played at the Ejendals Arena. The teams involved were Canada, the United States, Sweden, and Finland.

November 7

- Canada 4 - 1 Finland
- Sweden 0 - 4 USA

November 8

- Canada 6 - 3 USA
- Sweden 0 - 3 Finland

November 10

- Finland 1 - 2 USA
- Sweden 3 - 5 Canada

November 11

- game for the 3rd place: Finland 1 - 0 Sweden
- game for the first place : USA 0 - 2 Canada

Canada defeated the USA 2-0 in the gold medal game.

- Gold - Canada
- Silver - USA
- Bronze - Finland
- Fourth - Sweden

== See also ==
- 4 Nations Cup
