= All-Ivy League women's ice hockey players (2000–2009) =

Women's "All-Ivy League" ice hockey teams have been formed from players at American universities in the Ivy League.

== 1999-2000 ==
- First Team All-Ivy League

Player	Position	School
Ali Brewer	G	Brown
Tara Mounsey	D	Brown
Angela Ruggiero	D	Harvard
Jennifer Botterill	F	Harvard
Tammy Lee Shewchuk	F	Harvard
Andrea Kilbourne	F	Princeton

== 2000-01 ==
- First Team All-Ivy League

Player	Position	School
Meaghan Cahill	G	Dartmouth
Correne Bredin	D	Dartmouth
Cara Gardner	D	Brown
Jennifer Botterill	F	Harvard
Tammy Lee Shewchuk	F	Harvard
Kristin King	F	Dartmouth

== 2001-02 ==
- First Team All-Ivy League

Player	Position	School
Katie Germain (Sophomore)	G	Brown
Megan Van Beusekom (Sophomore)	G	Princeton
Aviva Grumet-Morris (Senior)	D	Princeton
Cassie Turner (Junior)	D	Brown
Kristy Zamora (Senior)	F	Brown
Carly Haggard (Junior)	F	Dartmouth
Kalen Ingram (Junior)	F	Harvard
Kristin King (Senior)	F	Dartmouth

- Second Team All-Ivy League

Player	Position	School
Amy Ferguson (Junior)	G	Dartmouth
Sanya Sandahl (Junior)	G	Cornell
Brooke Bestwick (Junior)	D	Cornell
Jamie Hagerman (Junior)	D	Harvard
Jessica Link (Freshman)	F	Brown
Gretchen Anderson (Sophomore)	F	Princeton
Nicole Corriero (Freshman)	F	Harvard

- Honorable Mention

Player	Position	School
Erinn Perushek (Senior)	D	Cornell
Louise Pietrangelo (Sophomore)	D	Dartmouth
Meredith Ostrander (Senior)	D	Brown
Jenel Bode (Senior)	F	Cornell
Kim McCullough (Senior)	F	Dartmouth

- Player of the Year
  - Carly Haggard (Junior), Dartmouth
  - Kristy Zamora (Senior), Brown
- Rookie of the Year
  - Nicole Corriero (Freshman), Harvard

== 2002-03 ==
- First Team All-Ivy League

Player	Position	School
Megan Van Beusekom	G	Princeton
Correne Bredin	D	Dartmouth
Angela Ruggiero	D	Harvard
Jennifer Botterill	F	Harvard
Julie Chu	F	Harvard
Andrea Kilbourne	F	Princeton

== 2003-04 ==
- First Team All-Ivy League

Player	Position	School
Megan Van Beusekom	G	Princeton
Sarah Love	D	Yale
Amy McLaughlin	D	Brown
Angela Ruggiero	D	Harvard
Jessica Link	F	Brown
Nicole Corriero	F	Harvard
Gretchen Anderson	F	Princeton

== 2004-05 ==
- First Team All-Ivy League

Player	Position	School
Roxanne Gaudiel	G	Princeton
Myria Heinhuis	D	Brown
Ashley Banfield	D	Harvard
Nicole Corriero	F	Harvard
Julie Chu	F	Harvard
Jessica Link	F	Brown

== 2005-06 ==
- First Team All-Ivy League

Player	Position	School
Roxanne Gaudiel	G	Princeton
Myria Heinhuis	D	Brown
Laura Watt	D	Princeton
Hayley Moore	F	Brown
Kim Pearce	F	Princeton
Jennifer Raimondi	F	Harvard

== 2006-07 ==
- First Team All-Ivy League

Player	Position	School
Carli Clemis	G	Dartmouth
Caitlin Cahow	D	Harvard
Laura Watt	D	Princeton
Gillian Apps	F	Dartmouth
Julie Chu	F	Harvard
Katie Weatherston	F	Dartmouth

== 2007-08 ==
- First Team All-Ivy League

Player	Position	School
Christina Kessler	G	Harvard
Caitlin Cahow	D	Harvard
Katherine Dineen	D	Princeton
Sasha Sherry	D	Princeton
Hayley Moore	F	Brown
Rebecca Johnston	F	Cornell
Sarah Vaillancourt	F	Harvard

== 2008-09 ==
- First Team All-Ivy League

Player	Position	School
Christina Kessler	G	Harvard
Sarah Newnam	D	Dartmouth
Katherine Dineen	D	Princeton
Jenna Cunningham	F	Dartmouth
Rebecca Johnston	F	Cornell
Sarah Vaillancourt	F	Harvard
