= 2003–04 Dartmouth Big Green women's ice hockey season =

American college ice hockey team season

This is a history of the 2003–04 season of the Dartmouth Big Green women's ice hockey team.

== Regular season ==
- In the first three games of the season, Katie Weatherston scored five goals and four assists. Four of the goals were power play goals.
- In the first five games of the season, Cherie Piper scored 12 points (3 goals, 9 assists) and was part of four game-winning goals.
- In a five-game stretch from January 21 to 31, Katie Weatherston scored nine goals and six assists.
- January 21 to March 12: Gillian Apps scored a goal in eight of nine games
- From January 21 to February 8: Tiffany Hagge scored 15 points (9 goals, 6 assists)
- October 31: In the Big Green’s first game of the season, Cherie Piper had a pair of goals and assists as the team defeated the Providence Friars. Gillian Apps scored a career-high four-goals in the game. It was the Big Green season opener, and she accumulated three goals in two minutes and fourteen seconds.
- November 9: Freshman Meredith Batcheller scored two power play goals in a 9-2 win over Vermont
- November 21: Versus the Princeton Tigers women's ice hockey program, Cherie Piper had assists on three of the Big Green’s four goals.
- November 22: Tiffany Hagge scored a hat trick and an assist versus the Yale Bulldogs
- January 10: Gillian Apps scored a hat trick in a tie at Brown.
- January 21: Against the Providence Friars women's ice hockey team, Katie Weatherston registered a hat trick.
- January 21: Against the Providence Friars, Tiffany Hagge scored three goals and an assist. Gillian Apps had a five-point game (four assists and a goal). During the weekend series against Providence, Apps was involved in nine of the team’s 17 goals against Providence (5 goals, 4 assists).
- January 31: Katie Weatherston scored two goals and two assists against the Union Dutchwomen
- March 6: Versus the Cornell Big Red women's ice hockey team, Katie Weatherston got her second hat trick.

== Players ==
- In 23 games, Gillian Apps scored at least a point in 16 of them. Apps finished second on the team to classmate Katie Weatherston in both power-play goals (five) and game winners (four). On two separate occasions, Apps scored hat tricks.
- Tiffany Hagge was in her sophomore season and played in 34 games. Hagge tied Cherie Piper for the Big Green lead in assists with 26. Hagge finished second overall in team scoring (47 points) while ranking third in goals scored (21). Hagge managed at least one point in 24 games and recorded multiple points in 17 games.
- Sophomore Cherie Piper missed part of the season, including the Frozen Four. This was attributed to commitment with the Canadian national team. Piper played in only 22 games but she scored 36 points. For the second consecutive season, she was on a line with Gillian Apps and Tiffany Hagge. As a centre on this line, Piper produced 26 assists. Piper’s 26 assists were tied with Hagge for the team lead.
- Katie Weatherston led the team in scoring with 48 points, and also led the team with 29 goals scored. She was nearly the fourth Dartmouth player with 30 goals in a season, and the seventh with 50 points. Weatherston tied the Big Green single-season team record in power play goals with 11 power-play goals.

== Postseason ==
In the NCAA Frozen Four, the St. Lawrence Skating Saints beat Dartmouth, as the Big Green ranked fourth.

== Awards and honors ==
- Gillian Apps, All-Ivy League second team
- Gillian Apps, honorable mention All-ECAC Hockey League
- Gillian Apps, ECAC Hockey League Player of the Week (Week of Nov. 3)
- Gillian Apps, ECAC Hockey League Player of the Week (Week of Nov. 24)
- Gillian Apps, twice named to the ECAC Hockey League Honor Roll
- Gillian Apps, USCHO Division I Offensive player of the Week (Week of Nov. 4)
- Tiffany Hagge, honorable mention for All-ECAC Hockey League
- Tiffany Hagge, Ivy League all-academic teams
- Tiffany Hagge, ECAC Hockey League all-academic teams
- Katie Weatherston, Second team for All-Ivy
- Katie Weatherston, Second team All-ECAC
- Katie Weatherston, ECAC Hockey League All-Academic team
- Katie Weatherston, USCHO Division I Offensive Player of the Week on Jan. 27, 2004
- Katie Weatherston, New England Hockey Writers Association Division I All-Star selection

== International ==
Tiffany Hagge played for the United States Under 22 team that competed in Lake Placid in 2004
