= 2005–06 Dartmouth Big Green women's ice hockey season =

American college ice hockey team season

The Dartmouth Big Green women's ice hockey team represented Dartmouth College during the 2005–06 season. Senior Tiffany Hagge was selected to be the Big Green team captain. Hagge was the top returning scorer from the 2004-05 squad and she joined Dartmouth’s 100 point club.

== Regular season ==
- Shannon Bowman scored two goals and an assist in her first game and accumulated six points in her first three contests (2 goals, 4 assists).
- December 10: Against the Providence Friars, Shannon Bowman scored the game-winning goal.
- January 27: Meredith Batcheller scored on the power-play versus the Union Dutchwomen.

== Notable players ==
- Meredith Batcheller accumulated 11 points (two goals, nine assists) while playing in 29 games. In a 4-3 loss to the Wisconsin Badgers, Batcheller had her first multi point game of the year (two assists).
- Freshman Shannon Bowman led the team in goals with 12. Bowman tied for second with Caroline Ethier in points scored with 23. In addition, she led the Big Green in shot percentage (.129) and her 93 shots were second overall. Her plus/minus of +8 was seconding a plus eight.
- Julia Bronson led all Dartmouth defenders in scoring with 12 points (five goals, seven assists) and appeared in 29 games. Her best game of the season was a three-point performance (1 goal, 2 assists) versus Union. In a 6-2 win at Clarkson, Bronson had a goal and an assists.

== International ==
- Gillian Apps and Cherie Piper missed the season so that they could represent Canada in Ice hockey at the 2006 Winter Olympics
- Shannon Bowman missed three contests to participate with Team Canada’s Under-22 National program
- Prior to the beginning of the season, Bronson participate in the USA Hockey Under 18 national camp.

== Awards and honors ==
- Shannon Bowman, Second team All-Ivy
