= 2004–05 Dartmouth Big Green women's ice hockey season =

American college ice hockey team season

These are the highlights of the 2004-2005 Dartmouth Big Green women's ice hockey season. They qualified for the NCAA Regional Hockey Tournament and participated in the Frozen Four.

== Regular season ==
- In the season opening game against Boston College, Weatherston accumulated five points (three goals, two assists).
- In the first game of the season, Cherie Piper scored the Big Green's first goal of the year just two minutes into the game. Dartmouth's opponent was Boston College.
- In the second game of the season, Weatherston scored both a short handed and a power-play goal. The two goal game was scored against Princeton
- In the third game of the season, Weatherston had a six-point game (4 goals, 2 assists). The Big Green vanquished the Yale Bulldogs.
- November 6 to December 11: Tiffany Hagge had a seven-game point streak
- January 7 to 8: Tiffany Hagge scored nine points in a two-game series versus the Union Dutchwomen. In the January 7 game, she had a career-high six point (3g. 3a) performance. The following night, she scored another hat-trick.
- February 4–5: Against Ivy League rivals Brown and Harvard, Tiffany Hagge accumulated five goals, including a hat trick vs. Brown

== Notable players ==
- Tiffany Hagge was in her junior season and played in 33 games. She scored 27 goals, (21 were scored in conference play) while registering four hat tricks, and was third overall in team scoring with 48 points. Her 21 assists were good for fourth and she recorded multiple points in 15 games.
- In her junior year, Cherie Piper led Dartmouth in points (60) and assists (37). In addition, Piper scored ten power-play goals and six game winning goals. Of the 27 games that she appeared in, 18 were multi-point games. Against Minnesota, she scored two goals and four assists, and she had one goal and five assists versus the Union Dutchwomen. Against the Providence Friars, Piper scored four goals.
- Katie Weatherston led the team in goals scored with 38, despite playing in only 31 games. Weatherston finished second on the team in points with 53. Of her 38 goals, 15 were power-play goals, three were short handed goals, and she had 5 hat tricks. She led the team in power play goals, short-handed goals and hat tricks. Against New Hampshire, she scored a hat trick and they were all three of the team's goals.

== Postseason ==
- In the ECAC Hockey League playoffs, Tiffany Hagge registered seven points (four goals and three assists)
- On March 19, Dartmouth defeated the Wisconsin Badgers 4–3, to qualify for the NCAA Frozen Four. In the Frozen Four, the Big Green lost to the eventual NCAA champion Minnesota Golden Gophers on March 25 by a score of 7–2.

== Awards and honors ==
- Tiffany Hagge, Second team All-Ivy
- Tiffany Hagge, All-ECAC Hockey League
- Tiffany Hagge, Third team All-USCHO.com
- Tiffany Hagge, Ivy League all-academic team
- Tiffany Hagge, ECAC Hockey League all-academic team
- Meagan Walton, 2004-05 USCHO.com Unsung Hero Award
