= 2012 in women's ice hockey =

The following are the women's ice hockey events of the year 2012 throughout the world.

== Championships ==
- 2012 CIS Women's Ice Hockey Championship: Calgary Dinos
- 2012 Clarkson Cup: Montreal Stars
- 2012 IIHF World Women's U18 Championship: Canada.
- 2012 Meco Cup: Finland
- 2012 NCAA National Collegiate Women's Ice Hockey Tournament: Minnesota Golden Gophers
- 2012 NCAA Division III Women's Ice Hockey Tournament: RIT Tigers

== January to March ==
- January 7: Canada defeated the United States by a 3-0 tally in the gold medal game at the 2012 IIHF World Women's U18 Championship. Emerance Maschmeyer earned the shutout for Canada, and Alexis Crossley scored the game-winning goal. Directorate awards for the tournament were given to Franziska Albl (Germany: Best Goaltender), Erin Ambrose (Canada: Best Defender), and Alex Carpenter (USA: Best Forward)
- January 6–7: Natalie Spooner had a record-breaking weekend in the Buckeyes’ conference series versus St. Cloud State. She scored three goals and added one assist in a two-game set while becoming the Buckeyes all-time leading goal scorer. Heading into the series, she was only three goals away from breaking the school record of 86 set by forward Jeni Creary. She tied the mark on January 6, 2012, as she scored both goals including the game-winner. In addition, she was acknowledged as the First Star of the Game in a 2-0 win. The following day, she set the record at 5:27 of the third period versus St. Cloud State in a 4-3 loss. Spooner was named Third Star of the Game. After the game, Spooner had accumulated 140 career points (87 goals, 53 assists) to rank fourth in that category. She is now six points shy of breaking the Buckeyes all-time scoring record.
- January 10: The Dartmouth Big Green and Providence Friars played each other in an outdoor game at Fenway Park in Boston. With 1:14 remaining in regulation, Big Green forward Camille Dumais scored the game-winning goal on Providence netminder Genevieve Lacasse as the Big Green prevailed by a 3-2 mark.
- In a January 22, 2012 matchup versus the Number 1 nationally ranked McGill Martlets, the Carleton Ravens defeated McGill for the first time in program history. The final score was a 4-3 mark in a shootout for the upset. Prior to the loss, the Martlets had won 116 of their last 117 regular season games.
  - Less than two minutes into the first period, Ravens skater Erin Beaver logged the first goal of the contest. Martlets skater Kim Ton-That tied the game but Carleton's leading goal scorer, Claudia Bergeron restored the lead for the Ravens as she scored on Charline Labonte. In the second period, the Ravens were outshot 13-6, as Stacie Tardif tied the match at two goals apiece. She would also score in the third period to give the Martlets their first lead of the game.
  - On the power play, team captain Sara Seiler beat Labonte with a wrist shot to tie the game. Ravens goaltender Tamber Tisdale stopped 32 of 35 shots, as the clubs would have to go to a shootout. Ravens skaters Melanie McKnight and Sydnie MacDonald both scored in the shootout to give the Ravens their historic victory.
- At the Innsbruck 2012 Winter Youth Olympic Games, women's ice hockey was one of the sports that were contested. The only women's teams that competed in the Ice Hockey competition at Innsbruck 2012 were Austria, Germany, Kazakhstan, Slovakia and Sweden.
  - The National Olympic Committees of the top five International Ice Hockey Federation teams were given an option to send either their men's or women's teams to compete. Canada, USA, Russia and Finland sent their men's teams to the Youth Olympic Games. Sweden opted to send their women.
- In a February 18, 2012 contest versus the Robert Morris Colonials, Hillary Pattenden competed in the final regular season game of her NCAA career. Heading into the game, she had 99 career regular season victories, and was aiming to be the first NCAA women's goaltender with 100 career wins. With a 4-3 Mercyhurst lead late in the third period, Colonials skater Dayna Newsom recorded a game-tying goal, as both teams skated to a 4-4 final score.
- In a 7-1 victory over MSU-Mankato on February 18, Minnesota Duluth forward Haley Irwin netted the 200th point of her NCAA career. She became the sixth-ever Bulldog to score 200 career points as she registered a power play goal in the first period.

== April to June ==
- April 6, 2012: Yale Bulldogs player Aleca Hughes is named the winner of the 2012 Hockey Humanitarian Award Winner On April 2, she is also named the winner of the 2012 Sarah Devens Award.
- April 11: Cassie Campbell is named the first female recipient of the Order of Hockey in Canada.
- April 14: In the bronze medal game at the 2012 IIHF Women's World Championship, Florence Schelling made 50 saves as Switzerland beat Finland by a 6-2 tally.
- April 14: With less than three minutes remaining in the gold medal game at the 2012 IIHF Women's World Championship, Canada's Meghan Agosta scores the game tying goal with less than three minutes in the third period. In overtime, Caroline Ouellette scores the game-winning goal as Canada defeats the United States by a 5-4 tally.
- May 25: Kelli Stack is awarded the 2012 Bob Allen Women's Player of the Year Award (given to the best women's ice hockey player in the United States).
- May 31: Taylor Gross is named captain of the Penn State Nittany Lions for the 2012–13 Penn State Nittany Lions women's ice hockey season, their first ever season in NCAA Division I hockey.
- June 12: The 2006 women's Olympic hockey team that competed in Torino, Italy will be inducted into the Canadian Olympic Hall of Fame.
- June 26: At the 2012 Hockey Canada Foundation Gala in Toronto, members of the IIHF Under 18 and IIHF Women's World championship teams are honored with championship rings to commemorate their victories.

== July to September ==
- July 17: With the first pick in the 2012 CWHL Draft, the Alberta Honeybadgers select Hillary Pattenden.

== Awards and honors ==
- NCAA All-America honors
  - First team

Player	Position	School
Florence Schelling	G	Northeastern
Laura Fortino	D	Cornell
Megan Bozek	D	Minnesota
Rebecca Johnston	F	Cornell
Brianna Decker	F	Wisconsin
Jocelyne Lamoureux	F	North Dakota

  - Second team

Player	Position	School
Zuzanna Tomcikova	G	Bemidji State
Monique Lamoureux	D	North Dakota
Lauriane Rougeau	D	Cornell
Hilary Knight	F	Wisconsin
Amanda Kessel	F	Minnesota
Natalie Spooner	F	Ohio State
