= Dartmouth Big Green women's ice hockey =

- Current season
- University: Dartmouth College
- Conference: ECAC
- Head coach: Maura Crowell; 1st season
- Arena: Thompson Arena; Hanover, New Hampshire
- Colors: Dartmouth green and white

NCAA tournament Frozen Four
- 2001, 2003, 2004, 2005

NCAA tournament appearances
- 2001, 2003, 2004, 2005, 2007, 2009, 2011

Conference tournament champions
- 2001, 2003, 2007, 2009

Conference regular season champions
- 2001, 2002, 2007

The Dartmouth Big Green women's ice hockey program represents Dartmouth College. The Big Green have reached the NCAA Division I women's ice hockey tournament eight times.

In 2001, Dartmouth participated in the inaugural NCAA Championship tournament. Since then, they have appeared in the "Frozen Four", the semifinals of the NCAA hockey tournament, three additional times.

== History ==
Dartmouth College started a women’s ice hockey program on January 7, 1978, six years after first admitting women students. The Big Green defeated Middlebury by a 6–5 score. The Big Green finished their inaugural season with 7 wins, 7 losses, and 1 tie. Against Ivy League teams, the Big Green was 1–3–1.

Big Green player Judy Parish Oberting was named to the first U.S. National Team that competed at the 1990 IIHF Women's World Championship. Oberting was named to the Ivy League's Silver Anniversary Team in 1999. In addition, she coached the Dartmouth's women's hockey team from 1998–2003.

In 1998, Sarah Hood was one of two Ivy League players named first team All-Americans. This was the first time that Ivy League women's hockey players were bestowed such an honor.

The team has won the ECAC regular season title in 2001, 2002, and 2007 and the post-season tournament in 2001, 2003, 2007, and 2009. The Big Green was the Ivy League champion 8 times (1991, 1993, 1995, 1998, 2001, 2002, 2004 and 2007).

The Ivy league announced in July 2020 that play would be suspended in Fall 2020 due to the coronavirus pandemic.

In August 2020, Laura Schuler stepped down as head coach, and Morgan Illikainen, Class of '15, was chosen as interim head coach.

On May 31, 2024, Maura Crowell was named head coach.

=== Year by year ===
Won Conference Championship	Lost Conference Championship	Regular Season Conference Champions

Year	Coach	W	L	T	Conference	Conf. W	Conf. L	Conf. T	Points	Conference Rank	Conference Tournament	NCAA Tournament
1998–99	Judy Parish Oberting	16	9	5	ECAC	14	7	5	33	Tied 5th	Won Quarterfinals vs. Brown (3–0); Lost Semifinals vs. Harvard (1–8)	—
1999–2000	Judy Parish Oberting	21	12	0	ECAC	17	7	0	34	Tied 3rd	Won Quarterfinals vs. Providence(1–0 OT); Won Semifinals vs. Harvard (3–2 OT); Lost Championship vs. Brown (3–6)	AWCHA; Lost Semifinals vs. Brown (2–4); Won Third-place game vs. Minnesota–Duluth (5–4)
2000–01	Judy Parish Oberting	26	5	1	ECAC	20	3	1	41	1st	Won Quarterfinals vs. Niagara (3–1); Won Semifinals vs. Brown (3–2 OT); Won Championship vs. Harvard (3–1)	Lost Semifinals vs. St. Lawrence (1–3); Lost Third-place game vs. Harvard (2–3)
2001–02	Judy Parish Oberting	24	6	2	ECAC	13	3	0	26	1st	Won Quarterfinals vs. Colgate (11–1, 6–0); Won Semifinals vs. Harvard (4–2); Lost Championship vs. Brown (3–4 OT)	—
2002–03	Judy Parish Oberting	27	8	0	ECAC	12	4	0	24	2nd	Won Quarterfinals vs. Colgate (8–0, 8–2); Won Semifinals vs. Princeton (4–2); Won Championship vs. Harvard (7–2)	Lost Semifinals vs. Minnesota–Duluth (2–5); Lost Third-place game vs. Harvard (1–3)
2003–04	Mark Hudak	24	8	2	ECAC	14	3	1	29	3rd	Won Quarterfinals vs. Yale (3–0, 4–3); Lost Semifinals vs. St. Lawrence (2–4)	Lost Semifinals vs. Minnesota (1–5); Lost Third-place game vs. St. Lawrence (1–2)
2004–05	Mark Hudak	27	8	0	ECAC	16	4	0	32	2nd	Won Quarterfinals vs. Colgate (4–0, 3–2); Won Semifinals vs. St. Lawrence (4–2); Lost Championship vs. Harvard (1–4)	Won Quarterfinals vs. Wisconsin (4–3); Lost Semifinals vs. Minnesota (2–7); Lost Third-place game vs. St. Lawrence (1–2)
2005–06	Mark Hudak	12	13	4	ECAC	9	8	3	21	Tied 7th	Lost Quarterfinals vs. Brown (2–4, 0–3)	—
2006–07	Mark Hudak	27	5	2	ECAC	20	1	1	41	1st	Won Quarterfinals vs. RPI (6–3, 3–1); Won Semifinals vs. Colgate (4–1); Won Championship vs. St. Lawrence (7–5)	Lost Quarterfinals vs. Boston College (2–3 2OT)
2007–08	Mark Hudak	18	9	6	ECAC	13	5	4	30	3rd	Won Quarterfinals vs. Colgate (4–3, 4–2); Lost Semifinals vs. St. Lawrence (1–3)	Lost Quarterfinals vs. Harvard (1–5)
2008–09	Mark Hudak	20	10	4	ECAC	13	5	4	30	4th	Won Quarterfinals vs. Colgate (6–7 OT, 2–1, 7–3 OT); Won Semifinals vs. St. Lawrence (5–2); Won Championship vs. RPI (6–1)	Lost Quarterfinals vs. Wisconsin (0–7)
2009–10	Mark Hudak	12	14	2	ECAC	9	12	1	19	9th	—	—
2010–11	Mark Hudak	22	12	0	ECAC	15	7	0	30	3rd	Won Quarterfinals vs. Clarkson (1–4, 4–2, 4–3 OT); Won Semifinals vs. Harvard (4–1); Lost Championship vs. Cornell (0–3)	Lost Quarterfinals vs. Cornell (1–7)
2011–12	Mark Hudak	18	10	2	ECAC	14	6	2	30	Tied 4th	Lost Quarterfinals vs. St. Lawrence (3–4 OT, 0–2)	—
2012–13	Mark Hudak	16	10	5	ECAC	11	7	4	26	6th	Lost Quarterfinals vs. Harvard (0–3, 0–4)	—
2013–14	Mark Hudak	9	20	1	ECAC	8	13	1	17	8th	Lost Quarterfinals vs. Clarkson (0–2, 0–2)	—
2014–15	Mark Hudak	13	15	2	ECAC	9	11	2	20	8th	Lost Quarterfinals vs. Clarkson (0–6, 1–4)	—
2015–16	Mark Hudak	6	19	3	ECAC	6	13	3	15	10th	—	—
2016–17	Laura Schuler	7	21	0	ECAC	5	17	0	10	11th	—	—
2017–18	Joe Marsh*	5	19	3	ECAC	3	16	3	9	11th	—	—
2018–19	Laura Schuler	5	21	3	ECAC	4	16	2	10	10th	—	—
2019–20	Laura Schuler	7	19	3	ECAC	4	15	3	11	10th	—	—
2020-21	Did not play due to COVID 19											
2021-22	Liz Keady Norton	9	19	1	ECAC	3	18	1	10.5	11th	—	—
2022-23	Liz Keady Norton	8	21	0	ECAC	4	18	0	14	12th	—	—

* Schuler took a one-year leave to coach the 2018 Canadian Women's Olympic Hockey Team.

== Current roster ==
As of September 8, 2022.

No.	Nat.	Player	Class	Pos	Height	DoB	Hometown	Previous team
2		Cally Dixon	Freshman	F	5' 7" (1.7 m)	2004-03-01	Woodbridge, Connecticut	Loomis Chaffee School
3		Kenzie Bachelor	Sophomore	D	5' 10" (1.78 m)	2002-10-15	Shakopee, Minnesota	Shakopee High School
4		Sydney Herrington	Senior	F	5' 9" (1.75 m)	2000-01-01	Bow, New Hampshire	Northeastern University
5		Izee Powell	Freshman	D	5' 4" (1.63 m)	2004-01-15	Oxford, Ohio	Pittsburgh Penguins Elite
6		Sophie Robinson	Junior	D	5' 9" (1.75 m)	2002-04-28	Baxter, Minnesota	Brainerd High School
7		Abby Grexton	Junior	F	5' 10" (1.78 m)	2002-01-01	Thornbury, Ontario	Ridley College
8		Laura Fuoco	Sophomore	F	5' 11" (1.8 m)	2003-04-01	Mississauga, Ontario	Brampton Jr. Canadettes
9		Celine Pietraszek	Senior	F	5' 5" (1.65 m)	2001-04-19	Colorado Springs, Colorado	Shattuck-Saint Mary's
10		Shae Messner	Freshman	F	5' 7" (1.7 m)	2004-04-09	Mound, Minnesota	Holy Family Catholic High School
11		Georgia Kraus	Senior	F	5' 5" (1.65 m)	2001-03-20	West Hartford, Connecticut	Loomis Chaffee School
12		Jenna Donohue	Junior	F	5' 8" (1.73 m)	2001-04-09	South Salem, New York	Loomis Chaffee School
13		CC Bowlby	Senior	F	5' 4" (1.63 m)	2000-09-25	Edina, Minnesota	Edina High School
14		Lauren Messier	Sophomore	F	5' 5" (1.65 m)	2003-07-03	Burlington, Ontario	Stoney Creek Jr. Sabres
17		Currie Putrah	Senior	F	5' 6" (1.68 m)	2001-01-10	Faribault, Minnesota	Shattuck-Saint Mary's
18		Maura Fiorenza	Freshman	D	5' 10" (1.78 m)	2004-01-01	Wilmington, Massachusetts	The Governor's Academy
19		Carlie Primomo	Sophomore	F	5' 3" (1.6 m)	2003-01-21	Toronto, Ontario	Brampton Jr. Canadettes
20		Caroline Appleyard	Sophomore	F	5' 7" (1.7 m)	2003-01-17	Rye, New York	Loomis Chaffee School
21		Vanessa Stamper	Freshman	F	5' 3" (1.6 m)	2003-05-09	Bloomfield Hills, Michigan	Bishop Kearney Selects
23		Kate McDermott	Sophomore	F	5' 7" (1.7 m)	2001-09-12	Duxbury, Massachusetts	Williston Northampton School
25		Meredith Jensen	Sophomore	D	5' 8" (1.73 m)	2004-06-30	Lakeville, Minnesota	Lakeville North High School
26		Tiffany Hill	Junior	F	5' 5" (1.65 m)	2001-04-16	Dartmouth, Nova Scotia	St. Paul's School
27		Annie King	Junior	F	5' 5" (1.65 m)	2002-01-27	Regina, Saskatchewan	Notre Dame Hounds
30		Elle Sullivan	Freshman	G	5' 8" (1.73 m)	2005-08-07	Shrewsbury, Massachusetts	Cushing Academy
33		Margaret Burden	Freshman	G	5' 4" (1.63 m)	2004-01-12	Kenilworth, Illinois	Shattuck-Saint Mary's
36		Maggie Emerson	Sophomore	G	5' 6" (1.68 m)	2001-03-30	Belmont, Massachusetts	Kingston Jr. Ice Wolves

== Career stats ==
=== Scoring ===
Player	Goals	Assists	Points
Gretchen Ulion	189	123	312
Judy Parish Oberting	89	126	215
Carly Haggard	114	90	204
Lori Jacobs	104	96	200
Katie Weatherston	113	72	185
Cherie Piper	60	105	165
Gillian Apps	90	68	158
Sarah Parsons	66	90	156
Sarah Hood	73	74	147
Sarah Howald	75	71	146
Kim Cohen	35	109	144
Correne Bredin	44	93	137
Estey Ticknor	66	67	133
Tiffany Hagge	64	69	133
Kim McCullough	60	70	130
Camille Dumais	58	71	129
Amanda Trunzo	68	59	127
Rachel Rochet	63	64	127
Jennifer Wiehn	62	64	126
Jenna Cunningham	63	62	125

== Captains ==
Season	Captains
1977–78	Lea Bolling and Kathy Leggat
1978–79	Cinda Fernald and Nancy Wilder
1979–80	Janice Ellis and Holly Raths
1980–81	Janice Ellis and Betsy Field
1981–82	Meg Bailey and Anne Elizabeth Dean
1982–83	Anne Elizabeth Dean and Heather Roulston
1983–84	Paula Joyce and Julia Nye
1984–85	Carol Lewis and Estey Ticknor
1985–86	Anne Desmond
1986–87	Linda Duva and Sudie Naimi
1987–88	Karin Clough and Nancy Toland
1988–89	Betsy Aldrich and Gina Gualtieri
1989–90	Kelley Coyne
1990–91	Robin Chandler and Judy Parish Oberting
1991–92	Lori Jacobs
1992–93	Margot Whinery
1993–94	Kim Cohen, Kim Reid and Gretchen Ulion
1994–95	Rachel Rochat
1995–96	Michelle Erickson, Sarah Howald and Sarah Devens Honorary Captain
1996–97	Amy Coelho and Malaika Little
1997–98	Sarah Hood, Jen Lane and Emilie Schnitman
1998–99	Kathleen O'Keefe and Wendy Soutsos
1999–2000	Kristina Guarino and Carrie Sekela
2000–01	Kristina Guarino and Jennifer Wiehn
2001–02	Kristin King and Kim McCullough
2002–03	Correne Bredin, Carly Haggard and Lydia Wheatley
2003–04	Sarah Clark, Meagan Walton and Lydia Wheatley
2004–05	Alana BreMiller and Meagan Walton
2005–06	Tiffany Hagge
2006–07	Gillian Apps
2007–08	Nicole Ruta
2008–09	Shannon Bowman and Sarah Newnam
2009–10	Sarah Parsons and Jenna Cunningham
2015–16	Catherine Berghuis and Laura Stacey
2016–17	Mackenzie St. Onge
2017-18	Christina Rombaut
2018-19	Christina Rombaut
2019-20	Christina Rombaut
2020-21	Jennifer Costa and Gabby Billing

== Olympians ==
Player	Games	Nation	Medal
Gillian Apps	2006 Winter Olympics	Canada	Gold
Gillian Apps	2010 Winter Olympics	Canada	Gold
Gillian Apps	2014 Winter Olympics	Canada	Gold
Kristin King	2006 Winter Olympics	United States	Bronze
Sarah Parsons	2006 Winter Olympics	United States	Bronze
Cherie Piper	2002 Winter Olympics	Canada	Gold
Cherie Piper	2006 Winter Olympics	Canada	Gold
Cherie Piper	2010 Winter Olympics	Canada	Gold
Rachel Rochat	2006 Winter Olympics	Switzerland	
Laura Stacey	2022 Winter Olympics	Canada	Gold
Sarah Tueting	1998 Winter Olympics	United States	Gold
Sarah Tueting	2002 Winter Olympics	United States	Silver
Gretchen Ulion	1998 Winter Olympics	United States	Gold
Katie Weatherston	2006 Winter Olympics	Canada	Gold

== Awards and honors ==
- Gillian Apps, 2007: Patty Kazmaier Award Finalist, ECAC Player of the Year, Ivy League Player of the Year, AWHCA All-America
- Correne Bredin, 2001 AWHCA All-America, First Team All-ECAC, First Team All-Ivy. 2003 AWHCA All-America, First Team All-Ivy
- George Crowe, 1996 ECAC Co-coach of the year, 2004 Joe Burke Award
- Sarah Devens, 1993: ECAC Rookie of the Year, Ivy League Rookie of the Year
- Carly Haggard, 2000: ECAC Rookie of the Year, Ivy League Rookie of the Year. 2002: Patty Kazmaier Award Finalist, ECAC Player of the Year, Ivy League Player of the Year, AWHCA All-America. 2003: Patty Kazmaier Award Finalist, First Team All-ECAC
- Sarah Hood, 1997: First Team All-Ivy. 1998: Patty Kazmaier Award Finalist, Sarah Devens Award, AWHCA All-America, First Team All-ECAC, First Team All-Ivy
- Judy Parish Oberting, 1988: First Team All-ECAC, First Team All-Ivy, ECAC Rookie of the Year. 1989 First Team All-Ivy. 1990 First Team All-Ivy
- Lottie Odnoga, 2019-20 All-Ivy League Honorable Mention
- Sarah Parsons, 2007: ECAC Rookie of the Year, Ivy League Rookie of the Year. 2010 First Team All-Ivy
- Cherie Piper, 2005 Patty Kazmaier Award Finalist
- 9 Sanders, 1983 Ivy League Rookie of the Year, 1985 First Team All-Ivy
- Estey Ticknor, 1982 Ivy League Rookie of the Year, 1984 First Team All-Ivy, 1985 First Team All-Ivy
- Laura Stacey, 2013: ECAC Hockey All-Rookie Team, 2015: Honorable Mention All-Ivy, ECAC Hockey All-Academic 2016: First Team All-Ivy, Academic All-Ivy, ECAC Hockey Third Team All-League, ECAC Hockey All-Academic
- Sarah Tueting, 1995: First Team All-ECAC, Ivy League Rookie of the Year
- Gretchen Ulion, 1991: Ivy League Rookie of the Year. 1992: First Team All-Ivy. 1993: Ivy League Player of the Year, First Team All-ECAC. 1994: Ivy League Player of the Year
- Katie Weatherston, 2005 AWHCA All-America, 2007 ECAC Tournament Most Valuable Player

=== All-Ivy ===
- Sarah Howald, 1996 First Team All-Ivy
- Kristin King, 2001 First Team All-Ivy, 2002 First Team All-Ivy
- Jenna Cunningham, 2009 First Team All-Ivy
- Laura Stacey, 2014-15 Honorable Mention All-Ivy, 2015-16 First Team All-Ivy
- Robyn Chemago, 2017 Second Team All-Ivy
- Christine Honor, 2017-18 Honorable Mention All-Ivy
- Lotti Odnoga, 2019-20 Honorable Mention All-Ivy
- Lauren Messier, 2024–25 Second Team All-Ivy
- Michaela Hesová, 2024–25 Second Team All-Ivy

=== New England hockey awards ===
- Mark Hudak, 2010–11 New England Women's Coach of the Year
- Kelly Foley, 2010–11 New England Women's Division I All-Stars

=== Statistical leaders ===
- Amy Ferguson, NCAA leader, 2000–01 season, Goalie winning percentage, .867
- Carly Haggard, NCAA leader, 2001–02 season, Points per game, 2.22
- Carly Haggard, NCAA leader, 2001–02 season, Goals per game, 1.16

== Big Green players in professional hockey ==
= CWHL All-Star	= NWHL All-Star	= Clarkson Cup Champion	= Isobel Cup Champion	= Walter Cup Champion

Player	Position	Team(s)	League(s)	Years	Clarkson Cup	Isobel Cup	Walter Cup
Gillian Apps	Forward	Brampton Thunder	CWHL				
Robyn Chemago	Goaltender	Boston Blades	CWHL				
Jenna Cunningham	Forward	Calgary Inferno	CWHL		1 (2016)		
Ailish Forfar	Forward	Markham Thunder	CWHL				
Sasha Nanji	Forward	Brampton Thunder; Toronto Furies	CWHL	2			
Cherie Piper	Forward	Brampton Thunder	CWHL				
Laura Stacey	Forward	Markham Thunder; Dream Gap Tour; Montréal Victoire	CWHL; PWHL		1 (2018) scored Cup clinching goal		1 (2026)
Morgan Turner	Forward	Worcester Blades	CWHL				
Katie Weatherston	Forward	Ottawa Capital Canucks; Montreal Stars	CWHL				

Player	Team	League
Kim Malcher	Mississauga Chiefs	CWHL
Christina Rombaut	MAC Budapest	EWHL
Caroline Shaunessy	HIFK	Liiga

== See also ==
- Category:Dartmouth Big Green women's ice hockey players
- Dartmouth Big Green men's ice hockey
