= 2006–07 Dartmouth Big Green women's ice hockey season =

American college ice hockey team season

The 2006–07 Dartmouth Big Green women's ice hockey team represented Dartmouth College. Olympic hockey player Gillian Apps was elected as the Big Green's team captain.

== Regular season ==
- October 21: Against the Mercyhurst Lakers women's ice hockey program, Jenna Cunningham had her first career point (an assist).
- October 28: Sarah Parsons had a career-high seven-point game against Union, as Dartmouth won the game, 11–0.
- October 29: Against the Rensselaer Engineers, Parsons had three assists. In addition, Gillian Apps had her only hat trick of the season.
- November 24: In a 6–3 triumph over the Princeton Tigers women's ice hockey program, Piper notched two goals and two assists. Jenna Cunningham scored a hat trick, including the game-winning goal.
- December 15: Shannon Bowman scored the game-winning goal against the Harvard Crimson
- In a 7–0 victory over Quinnipiac, Parsons had one goal and three assists.
- In a 9–1 triumph over the Union Dutchwomen, Parsons had a hat trick and three assists. Cherie Piper would notch two goals and had five assists for a career high 7 point performance.
- From November 8 to December 18, Julia Bronson had an assist streak of four games
- From November 17 to January 27, team captain Gillian Apps had a 14-game point streak.
- In a 7–1 victory over the Cornell Big Red, Julia Bronson notched three assists.

== Notable players ==
- Meredith Batcheller appeared in 33 games and was one of the top defensive scorers on the team. She scored three goals and eight assists for 11 points and had a +16. During the season, Batcheller registered two multi-point games.
- As a freshman, Sarah Parsons appeared in 32 games and led the Big Green in points (50 – ranked eighth in the NCAA), assists (36 – ranked fourth in the NCAA) and plus/minus (+29). In addition, she led all ECAC rookies in scoring. Her average of 1.56 points per game ranked second in the NCAA among all rookies. Parsons won ECAC Rookie of the Week honors twice and had 14 games in which she scored more than one point. In addition, she had seven-game scoring streaks twice during the season. For her efforts, Parsons earned several accolades: ECAC Rookie of the Year and first team all-league. Her teammates voted her the Big Green Rookie of the Year.
- Jenna Cunningham was in her freshman year and appeared in 34 games. Cunningham led all freshmen with 15 goals. She ranked second in points among freshmen with 22 points. During the season, she scored six power play goals (all of them were scored in conference play). The first goal of her career came in an 11–0 win over the Union Dutchwomen. During the season, Cunningham had four multi-point games.
- In her senior year, Cherie Piper missed 11 games, but still ranked second on the Big Green with 27 assists. During the season, Piper notched two game-winning goals and a short-handed goal. The last game-winning goal of her Dartmouth career was registered on March 4 against the St. Lawrence Skating Saints in the ECAC Championship.
- Gillian Apps, granddaughter of former NHL player and Hockey Hall of Famer Syl Apps, recorded 14 multi-point games. In only five games, Apps did not register a point. By season's end, Apps led the Big Green with 30 goals and 158 shots. In addition, she finished her Dartmouth career as the all-time leader in penalty minutes (281).
- Defender Julia Bronson played in all of the Big Green's 34 games. Bronson had 17 assists while ranking third on the team with a +22. Her 17 assists ranked fourth in the ECAC among defenders.
- Despite missing eight games, Katie Weatherston ranked second on the team in goals (23). In addition, she was third overall in points (37) and first in power play goals (13). By season's end, Weatherston was first on the Big Green's all-time power play goals list During the season, she was awarded the ECAC Player of the Week honor and USCHO's Offensive Player of the Week once.
- Shannon Bowman appeared in 34 games and ranked fifth on the team with 27. She finished the season with a career-high 17 assists and had a +/- rating of +19.

== Player stats ==
Player	Games Played	Goals	Assists	Points	Penalty Minutes
Sarah Parsons	32	14	36	50	6
Gillian Apps	31	30	16	46	
Katie Weatherston	26	23	14	37	
Cherie Piper	23	10	27	37	
Shannon Bowman	34	10	17	27	
Jenna Cunningham	34	15	7	22	
Julia Bronson	34	1	17	18	18

== Postseason ==
=== 2007 ECAC Tournament ===
Round	Opponent	Score
Quarterfinal	# 8 Rensselaer	6-3
Quarterfinal	# 8 Rensselaer	3-1
Semifinal	# 7 Colgate	4-1
Final	# 2 St. Lawrence	7-3

- In the first round of the ECAC playoffs, Shannon Bowman had a four-point day versus the RPI Engineers women's ice hockey program.
- Parsons participated in the ECAC Championship game. Against St. Lawrence, she scored a goal and registered an assist. The club proceeded to the NCAA Regionals and challenged Boston College. Cherie Piper scored the school's last goal of the season.
- Weatherston accumulated 12 points in four ECAC playoff games. In Game One of the ECAC Quarterfinals against Rensselaer, Weatherstone scored four goals.
- Meredith Batcheller scored the game-winning goal in the first game of the series vs. RPI. In the ECAC Championship game against the St. Lawrence Skating Saints, Meredith Batcheller had two assists.

== International ==
Sarah Parsons made her fourth appearance with the United States Under-22 Select Team. Sophomore Julia Bronson earned an invite to the USA Hockey Women's National Festival. The invitation was to try out for the US National Under-22 Team.

== Awards and honors ==
- Gillian Apps, 2006-07 ECAC Coaches Preseason All-League Selection
- Gillian Apps, 2006-07 ECAC Media Preseason All-League Selection
- Gillian Apps, Most Valuable Player by the New England Hockey Writers
- Gillian Apps, ECAC Player of the Year
- Gillian Apps, ECAC First-Team all-league honors
- Gillian Apps, Top 10 Nominee, Patty Kazmaier Award
- Shannon Bowman, ECAC All-Tournament Team
- Julia Bronson, Honorable mention All-Ivy
- Julia Bronson, ECAC All-Academic team
- Julia Bronson, ECAC All-tournament team
- Jenna Cunningham, USCHO National Offensive Player of the Week (November 29, 2006)
- Jenna Cunningham, ECAC All-Academic team
- Sarah Parsons, Big Green Rookie of the Year (2007)
- Sarah Parsons, ECAC Rookie of the Year (2007)
- Sarah Parsons, ECAC first team all-league (2007)
- Sarah Parsons, ECAC Scoring Leader among rookies (2007)
- Sarah Parsons, earned a spot on the ECAC honor roll on November 6
- Katie Weatherston, 2006-07 ECAC Coaches Preseason All-League Selection
- Katie Weatherston, 2006-07 ECAC Media Preseason All-League Selection
- Katie Weatherston, ECAC tournament Most Outstanding Player
