= Bray Ketchum =

American ice hockey player and executive

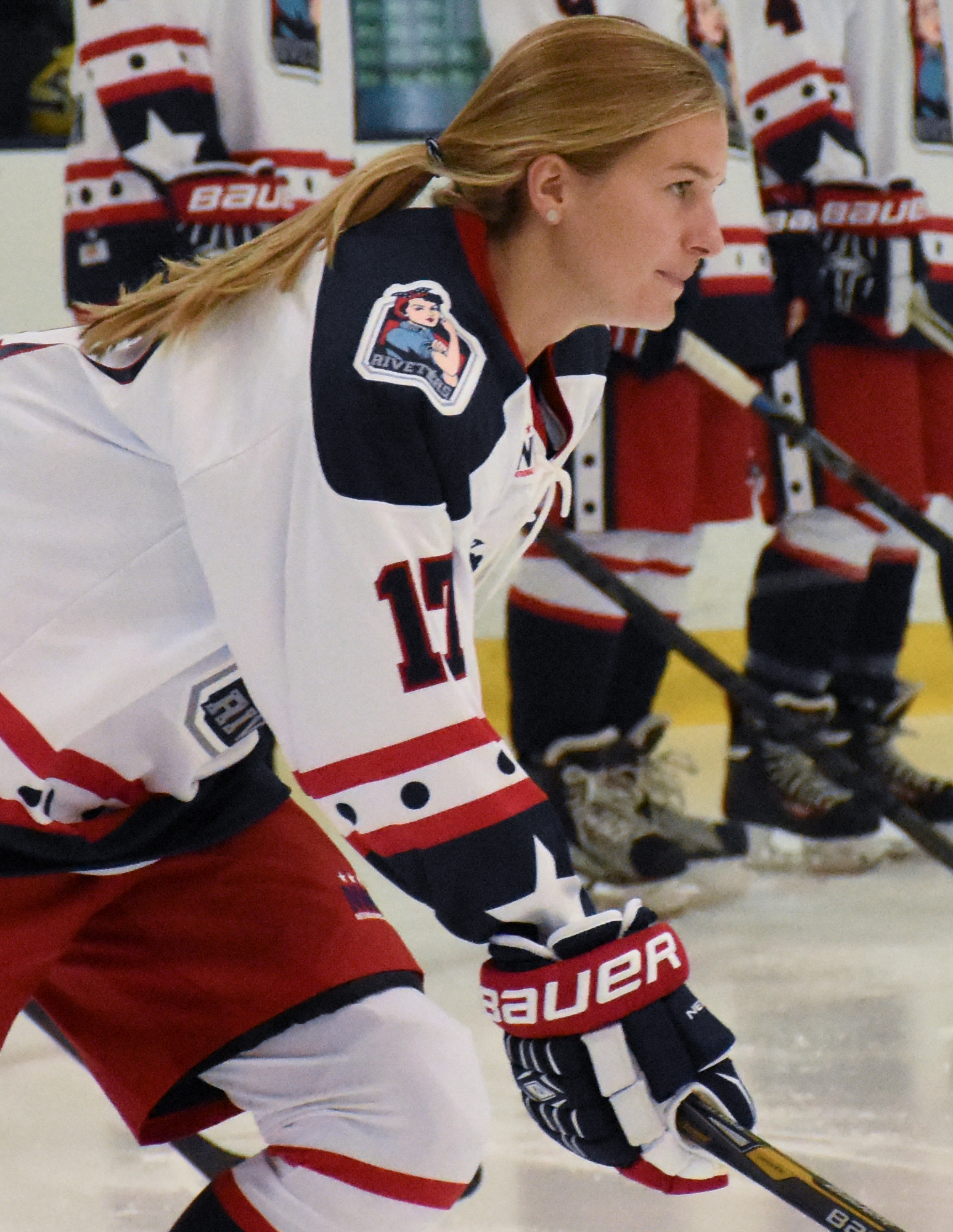
- Ketchum with the New York Riveters in 2015

Personal information
- Born: March 18, 1989 (age 37) Brussels, Belgium
- Home town: Greenwich, Connecticut, US
- Education: Yale University
- Occupations: Ice hockey executive, player
Ice hockey career
- Height: 5 ft 8 in (173 cm)
- Weight: 141 lb (64 kg; 10 st 1 lb)
- Position: Forward
- Shot: Left
- Played for: Metropolitan Riveters; Boston Pride; Boston Blades; Yale Bulldogs
- Playing career: 2007–2018
- Updated on January 1, 2021

Bray Ketchum (born March 18, 1989) is an American former ice hockey player and executive. She played for the Metropolitan Riveters of the Premier Hockey Federation (PHF) and the Boston Blades of the Canadian Women's Hockey League (CWHL), winning the Isobel Cup and the Clarkson Cup respectively, before ending her playing career and serving as general manager of the Connecticut Whale during the 2019–20 NWHL season.

== Playing career ==
Ketchum grew up playing on boys' teams until she reached the high school level. During her teenage years, she played for Greenwich Academy in Greenwich, Connecticut, leading the girls' ice hockey team in scoring three times and being named New England Prep School Div. II Player of the Year in 2007.

At the NCAA Division I level, she accumulated 84 points in 117 games while competing for the Yale Bulldogs women's ice hockey program of the ECAC Hockey conference from 2007 to 2011. She was selected to the ECAC Hockey All-Star Team that competed in an exhibition match against the American national team in preparation for the 2010 Winter Olympics.

Following her graduation, Ketchum played the 2011–12 and 2012–13 CWHL seasons with the Boston Blades. After sitting out the 2013–14 season, she was selected in the 6th round, 24th overall by thein the 2014 CWHL Draft and opted to return to the team. She picked up 4 points in 20 games in the 2014–15 CWHL season, competing in all postseason games as the Blades captured the 2015 Clarkson Cup.

She left the CWHL in 2015 to join the newly formed National Women's Hockey League, signing with the New York Riveters. She scored 14 points in 18 games in her debut NWHL season, leading the team in goals and including the game-winning goal in the Riveters' first-ever victory. In December 2015, she and Meghan Fardelmann were the two Riveters players loaned to the Boston Pride to participate in the 2016 Outdoor Women's Classic, the first outdoor professional women's hockey game.

Her production dropped during the 2016–17 season, down to 7 points in 17 games.

In the summer of 2017, she played for the Riveters in the Summit Series against the Russian national team, picking up an assist on Amanda Kessel's first ever NWHL goal.

Her production picked back up as the Riveters moved from Brooklyn to New Jersey for the 2017–18 season, becoming the Metropolitan Riveters. She scored 11 points in 16 games, serving as an assistant captain for the team, as the Riveters won the Isobel Cup for the first time.

In September 2018, Ketchum announced her retirement from professional play, stating that "This isn’t a goodbye, it’s a 'see you later!' Thank you to everyone who has let me live this incredible journey. I will forever be a Riv and a fan of this league!"

== International career ==
Ketchum played for the American U22 Select Team in 2010.

When the players of the senior American national team went on strike over pay and working conditions in 2017, she was invited to join the roster for the 2017 IIHF World Championship as a replacement for the striking players. She refused the invitation, stating, "it’s kind of sad that U.S.A. Hockey is almost in a sense ignoring [the striking players]."

== Post-playing career ==
In April 2019, the Connecticut Whale announced that they had hired Ketchum to serve as their general manager for the 2019-20 season. Despite the Whale finishing last in the league during the regular season, she was received praise for her handling of the team, especially as they had lost four out of their five All-Star players from the previous season and as the team showed a marked improvement in performance as the season progressed, eventually upsetting the Buffalo Beauts in the first round of the NWHL playoffs and holding the reigning Isobel Cup champions, the Minnesota Whitecaps, to one goal in the semi-finals.

She did not return to the Whale for the 2020–21 season, being replaced by Amy Scheer as she chose to focus on a new full-time teaching position outside of hockey instead.

== Personal life ==
Ketchum has a bachelor's degree in American Studies from Yale and works as a teacher outside of hockey. From 2016 to 2019, she ran a plant-based sports nutrition business called Upwild with her brother.

During her time at Yale, she played on a line with Mandi Schwartz, who died of acute myeloid leukemia in 2011. Ketchum would go on to wear Schwartz's jersey number, 17, to honour her during her professional career, and has served as a board member of the Mandi Schwartz Foundation. In senior year, she also played for Yale's women's lacrosse programme.

== Career statistics ==
Note: New York Riveters became the Metropolitan Riveters in 2017.

			Regular season					Playoffs
Season	Team	League	GP	G	A	Pts	PIM	GP	G	A	Pts	PIM
2007–08	Yale Bulldogs	NCAA	31	9	11	20	10	-	-	-	-	-
2008–09	Yale Bulldogs	NCAA	29	13	10	23	20	-	-	-	-	-
2009–10	Yale Bulldogs	NCAA	29	12	11	23	8	-	-	-	-	-
2010–11	Yale Bulldogs	NCAA	28	7	11	18	24	-	-	-	-	-
2011–12	Boston Blades	CWHL	20	0	6	6	2	3	0	0	0	0
2012–13	Boston Blades	CWHL	1	0	0	0	0	-	-	-	-	-
2014–15	Boston Blades	CWHL	20	3	1	4	0	3	0	0	0	0
2015–16	New York Riveters	PHF	18	10	4	14	18	2	0	0	0	0
2016–17	New York Riveters	PHF	17	2	5	7	2	1	0	0	0	0
2017–18	Metropolitan Riveters	PHF	16	5	6	11	4	2	1	0	1	0
CWHL totals			41	3	7	10	2	6	0	0	0	0
PHF totals			51	17	15	31	24	5	1	0	1	0
