= Hockey Humanitarian Award =

Annual award honoring college hockey players

The Hockey Humanitarian Award is presented annually to a male or female college ice hockey player who has made significant contributions to their community. Established in 1996, the award recognizes community service, leadership, character, and academic achievement in addition to athletic participation.

== Selection process ==
The award accepts nominations for male and female players from varsity college hockey programs in NCAA Division I, Division II, and Division III. Nominations are generally submitted by coaches and sports information directors. The award committee reviews the nominees, selects a group of finalists, and interviews the finalists before choosing the recipient.

The recipient is traditionally announced during the men's Frozen Four, in conjunction with the presentation of other national college hockey awards.

== History ==
The award was founded by John R. Greenhalgh and Jeffrey Millman. According to the award organization, the idea originated in October 1995, when Greenhalgh and Millman observed Boston University player J. P. McKersie volunteering as a youth hockey coach after recovering from a life-threatening accident that had left him in a coma.

McKersie became the first recipient of the Hockey Humanitarian Award in February 1996. A board of directors was subsequently formed with representatives from athletics, business, education, and the media. The award expanded into a national college hockey honor four years after its establishment.

== Winners ==
The award has been presented annually since 1996; joint recipients were selected in 2017.

Year	Player	School
1996	J. P. McKersie	Boston University
1997	Blake Sloan	Michigan
1998	Erik Raygor	Wisconsin
1999	Kristine Pierce	RIT
2000	James Leger	Maine
2001	Jason Cupp	Nebraska–Omaha
2002	Rocky Ray Reeves	Buffalo State
2003	Sam Paolini	Cornell
2004	Chanda Gunn	Northeastern
2005	Sarah Carlson	Boston College
2006	Eric Leroux	Princeton
2007	Kristin Savard	Yale
2008	William Bruce	Williams
2009	Missy Elumba	Northeastern
2010	Ethan Cox	Colgate
2011	Brooks Dyroff	Boston College
2012	Aleca Hughes	Yale
2013	Tucker Mullin	St. Anselm
2014	Jeffrey Reppucci	Holy Cross
2015	Brittany Ammerman	Wisconsin
2016	Chris Dylewski	Air Force
2017	Danny Divis	St. Michael's
2017	Justin McKenzie	St. Michael's
2018	Sidney Peters	Minnesota
2019	Jake Bunz	Wisconsin
2020	Amanda Conger	Saint Anselm
2021	Delaney Wolf	Saint Mary's
2022	Josh Kosack	Union
2023	Gabbie Hughes	Minnesota Duluth
2024	Dylan Lugris	Penn State
2025	Sarah Thompson	St. Lawrence
2026	Meg Simon	Middlebury
