= Dartmouth Big Green ice hockey =

Dartmouth Big Green ice hockey may refer to either of the ice hockey teams that represent Dartmouth College:

- Dartmouth Big Green men's ice hockey
- Dartmouth Big Green women's ice hockey
