= 2002–03 Dartmouth Big Green women's ice hockey season =

NCAA Frozen Four, Third Place
- Conference: ECAC
- Home ice: Thompson Arena

Record
- Overall: 27–8–0

Coaches and captains
- Head coach: Judy Oberting

The Dartmouth Big Green women's ice hockey team represented Dartmouth College in the 2002–03 Division I women's ice hockey season. Dartmouth beat Minnesota to rank third in the 2003 NCAA Frozen Four.

== Regular season ==
- November 15: Against the Colgate Raiders women's ice hockey program, Tiffany Hagge had her first three assist game
- November 20: Gillian Apps registered a hat trick and two assists against Vermont
- January 3: The first multiple-goal game of Tiffany Hagge’s career was scored against Findlay

== Notable players ==
- Gillian Apps was in her freshmen year and accumulated 22 goals, 13 assists and 35 points . Apps missed five games due to commitments with the Canadian National Team but she was still fourth on the Big Green in scoring. Apps was the team leader with six power-play goals and was tied for third on the team with four multiple-goal games. At one time in the season, Apps scored a goal in 13 of 18 games. During this streak, she had one point in 15 of 19 games. Apps was on an All-Freshman line with Tiffany Hagge and Cherie Piper.
- In her freshman year, Tiffany Hagge was on a prolific scoring line composed of fellow freshmen Gillian Apps and Cherie Piper. Hagge had a strong freshman season, finishing with 27 points and 18 assists (her 18 assists were tied for fourth among ECAC Hockey League freshmen).
- Olympian Cherie Piper joined the Big Green as a freshman and ranked fifth on the team with 32 points in 26 games. Piper scored 17 goals (good for fourth on the team), and her 15 assists ranked her fifth.

- Katie Weatherston had one of the best freshman seasons in Dartmouth history. Although she was second on team in scoring with 47 points, she tied for the team lead with 24 assists. Her 23 goals ranked second on the team. In addition, she tied for the team lead in game-winning goals with six

== Postseason ==
- March 7: Cherie Piper accumulated four points (one goal and three assists) in a game against the Colgate Raiders
- In the ECAC Hockey League semifinals, Tiffany Hagge scored the game-winning goal in a 4–2 win over Princeton.
- On March 8, Katie Weatherston scored her first career hat trick in a game against the Colgate Raiders. Tiffany Hagge recorded the second three assist game of her career.
- In the Frozen Four third-place game, Tiffany Hagge scored one of the goals as Dartmouth beat Minnesota 4–2.

== Awards and honors ==
- Gillian Apps, 2003 Honorable mention All-Ivy selection
- Katie Weatherston, All-Ivy League second team
- Katie Weatherston, ECAC Hockey League All-Rookie team

Katie Weatherston, All-ECAC Hockey League honorable mention
