= Yale Bulldogs ice hockey =

Yale Bulldogs ice hockey may refer to either of the ice hockey teams that represent Yale University:

- Yale Bulldogs men's ice hockey
- Yale Bulldogs women's ice hockey
