= 2007–08 Dartmouth Big Green women's ice hockey season =

American college ice hockey team season

This is a history of the 2007–08 season of the Dartmouth Big Green women's ice hockey team.

== Regular season ==
- October 28: In a 5-5 tie with the Boston University Terriers women's ice hockey program, Shannon Bowman had three assists.
- November 3: In a game against the Quinnipiac Bobcats women's ice hockey program, Parsons scored three points
- December 1: Jenna Cunningham had a goal and four assists for five points in a come-from-behind win versus the RPI Engineers women's ice hockey program. In that same game, Parsons had three points.
- Feb. 1 to Feb. 22, Julia Bronson had a season-long seven-game point scoring streak.
- February 9: On Senior Night, the Big Green played the Union Dutchwomen. Julia Bronson registered a career-high two goals, as Dartmouth defeated Union by a 4-1 score
- In the second game of the season, Julia Bronson posted season highs in assists and points. Bronson accumulated three assists as the Big Green tied Boston University 5-5

== Notable players ==
- Shannon Bowman played in 33 games and ranked fourth on the Big Green in scoring with 27 points. Her six power play goals were tied for first on the team. In an 8-0 win over the Cornell Big Red, Bowman had three assists. Versus the RPI Engineers, Bowman had two goals and one assist as the Big Green won the game.
- Junior Julia Bronson competed in 33 games and set a career-high in goals with 6 and tied for second on the team with three game-winning goals. Bronson ranked fourth overall among ECAC defenders in assists with 17.
- Jenna Cunningham appeared in 17 games and finished second on the Big Green with 37 points. Her 17 goals led the team, while her 20 assists ranked second. Her six power play goals led the Big Green while her plus/minus ranking of +13 was second on the team. In a 6-4 win over the Mercyhurst Lakers, Cunningham accumulated a career-high six points with a hat trick and three assists. Her 2.18 points per game ranked fifth in the conference.
- Sarah Parsons registered a career high in goals scored. Three of those goals were scored on the power play, while two were shorthanded, and two were game-winning goals. Parsons accumulated 34 points (15 goals, 19 assists) while participating in 31 games. Parsons finished her season with a 12-game point scoring streak (the Big Green’s record was 7-2-3 during the streak).

== Postseason ==
- Shannon Bowman finished the postseason as the club leader among active players in playoff points with 14.
- In the ECAC Tournament, the Big Green swept the Colgate Raiders. Sarah Parsons accumulated four points (three goals and an assist). Shannon Bowman registered three points (one goal, two assists) in the sweep. In the NCAA Tournament quarterfinals against Harvard, Parsons scored the Big Green’s only goal

== International ==
- Sarah Parsons competed for the U.S. National Team at the 2007 Four Nations Cup. In addition, Parsons played for the US National Team at the 2008 IIHF World Championships and won a gold medal.

== Awards and honors ==
- Julia Bronson, Honorable mention All-Ivy
- Jenna Cunningham, ECAC Hockey Player of the Week (Week of Oct. 29)
- Jenna Cunningham, ECAC Hockey Player of the Week (Week of Nov. 5)
- Jenna Cunningham, ECAC Hockey Player of the Week (Week of Dec. 17)
- Jenna Cunningham, USCHO National Player of the Week (Week of Nov. 5), after a seven-point weekend against the Princeton Tigers and Quinnipiac Bobcats
- Jenna Cunningham, ECAC Hockey Second Team
- Sarah Parsons, ECAC Hockey Third Team honors
- Sarah Parsons, Second team All-Ivy
