= 2008–09 Dartmouth Big Green women's ice hockey season =

2008-09 Dartmouth Big Green women's ice hockey season

2009 ECAC Tournament champions NCAA Tournament, Lost Regionals, 7-0 vs. Wisconsin
- Conference: ECAC
- Home ice: Thompson Arena

Record
- Overall: 20-10-4

Coaches and captains
- Head coach: Mark Hudak

== Regular season ==
- October 31: Sarah Parsons made her season debut and notched a goal and an assist against the Princeton Tigers
- November 7: Julia Bronson registered two assists against the Union Dutchowomen.
- November 21: Against the Cornell Big Red women's ice hockey team, Sarah Parsons had a goal and an assist
- November 22: In a game against the Colgate Raiders, Shannon Bowman had two assists. Jenna Cunningham had three points against Colgate Raiders women's ice hockey program
- January 6: Shannon Bowman registered two assists in a game against the Harvard Crimson women's ice hockey team. Jenna Cunningham had two goals
- January 10: Julia Bronson posted a season-high three assists against Brown added a goal and an assist at Vermont on Dec. 30
- January 16: In a game against then No-8 ranked New Hampshire, Parsons managed a two-goal game
- January 30: Against the RPI Engineers women's ice hockey team, Shannon Bowman accumulated two more assists. Jenna Cunningham recorded a season-high three points.
- January 31: By scoring a goal against Union, Parsons became the 29th Big Green player to reach 100 career points.
- February 14: Julia Bronson had two assists in the 3-3 draw with the Cornell Big Red. Jenna Cunningham had one goal.
- February 20: Jenna Cunningham had a three-point night (a goal and added two assists) against Clarkson Golden Knights women's ice hockey program
- In the last game of the season, Shannon Bowman scored her 100th career point in a game against St. Lawrence
- In a 9-1 win over Brown, Shannon Bowman had a goal and an assist
- From January 9 to 31, Parsons went on a six-game point streak (including three multi-point games)
- In a three-game series versus ECAC rival Colgate, the Big Green won all three games. Sarah Parsons contributed with five goals and two assists. In the first game, Parsons notched a hat trick, while scoring two goals in the second game. Two of her five goals were scored on power plays.
- Jenna Cunningham started the season with a five-game point streak (the streak included three multi-point games)

== Notable players ==
- During the season, Sarah Parsons played with a leg injury, but managed to appear in 30 games. Despite the injury, Parsons scored a career high in goals with 17. Added to her 15 assists, she finished the season with 32 points, respectively. Of her 17 goals, eight were scored on the power play, ranking second overall on the Big Green. Dating back to the previous season, Parsons entered the season with a 12-game scoring streak. In her second game of the 08-09 season, her streak was snapped against the St. Lawrence Skating Saints.
- Senior Julia Bronson appeared in all of Dartmouth's games and accomplished career highs in assists and points. (3 goals and 23 assists for 26 pointsBronson notched eight assists during a season-high six-game point streak, which included eight assists.
- Shannon Bowman appeared in 34 games and posted career-highs in assists and points (nine goals, twenty assists, twenty-nine points). She recorded at least one point in sixteen of the last twenty games of the season.
- Jenna Cunningham appeared in 34 games. She accumulated 13 goals and 22 assists for 35 points (her 22 assists were a career high). Her 15 power play points were third on the team. She registered a goal and two assists versus Boston College Eagles ice hockey program.

== Player stats ==
Player	Games Played	Goals	Assists	Points	Penalty Minutes
Sarah Parsons	30	17	15	32	12
Julia Bronson	34	3	23	36	20

== Postseason ==
- Bronson matched her regular season-high of three assists, by notching another three in the ECAC championship win over Rensselaer.
- In the ECAC Tournament, Sarah Parsons scored 12 points in five tournament contests. For her efforts, she was deemed the Most Valuable Player of the tournament.
- Jenna Cunningham had a goal in both the semifinals and finals of the ECAC Hockey Tournament.

== International ==
- Parsons once again donned the USA jersey and represented her country. She appeared at the Four Nations Cup in November 2008.

== Awards and honors ==
- Shannon Bowman, ECAC all-tournament team
- Shannon Bowman, voted by teammates as the Big Green's Most Valuable Player
- Jenna Cunningham, First team All-Ivy
- Jenna Cunningham, ECAC Hockey Second Team
- Sarah Parsons, ECAC Hockey Tournament's Most Outstanding Player
- Amanda Trunzo, Forward, 2009 Third Team All-ECAC
