= Maura Crowell =

American ice hockey coach

Current position
- Title: Head coach
- Team: Dartmouth
- Conference: ECAC
- Record: 5–21–3

Biographical details
- Born: Mansfield, Massachusetts, U.S.

Coaching career (HC unless noted)
- 2005–2010: UMass Boston
- 2010–2013: Harvard (Assistant)
- 2013–2014: Harvard
- 2014–2015: Harvard (Associate)
- 2015–2024: Minnesota Duluth
- 2024–present: Dartmouth

Head coaching record
- Overall: 272–194–36

Accomplishments and honors

Awards
- AHCA Coach of the Year (2017)

Maura Crowell (born 1980) is an American former ice hockey player and coach. She is the head coach for the Dartmouth Big Green women's ice hockey team.

== Playing career ==
Maura Crowell grew up in Mansfield, Massachusetts, and played ice hockey and field hockey at St. Mark's School in Southborough, Mass. She was captain of the ice hockey team in her junior and senior years, and led the team in points scored twice in her four years.

She attended college at Colgate University, where she studied German, and played left wing for the Colgate Raiders women's ice hockey team. During her collegiate career, she helped the Raiders make it to the ECAC Hockey playoffs three times. The Raiders played in the ECAC championship game in 2000, losing to Brown University. Crowell graduated in 2002.

== Coaching career ==
After graduating from college, Crowell returned to St. Mark's as the assistant coach for the girls hockey team and as head coach for the junior varsity girls lacrosse team. Crowell then went to Connecticut College, where she earned a Masters of Art in teaching. She served as assistant coach for the Connecticut College Camels women's ice hockey team from 2003 to 2005. During her time with the Camels, the team made its first ever playoff appearance. While in Connecticut, Crowell also volunteered as a speed skating coach with the Special Olympics.

=== UMass Boston Beacons ===
Crowell was selected as the head coach for the University of Massachusetts Boston women's ice hockey team in 2005. Her team set program records for wins in the 2009-20 season, finishing 17-9-0 overall, and 13-6-0 in conference play. Crowell was awarded the ECAC East Women's Ice Hockey Coach of the Year award that season, becoming the second women's ice hockey coach for UMass Boston to win the honor. Laura Shuler won the award in 2003-04. Crowell never had a losing season at UMass Boston, and became the winningest coach in the Beacon's program history in 2010.

In 2010, she was hired to be an Assistant coach for the 2010 USA Hockey women's national festival, held August 13–21 in Lake Placid, NY.

=== Harvard Crimson ===
In 2010, Crowell was hired as an assistant coach for the Harvard Crimson women's ice hockey team, and held that position for two seasons. In 2013-2014, when Crimson head coach Katey Stone took the head coaching position with Team USA's national women's ice hockey team for the Olympics, Crowell stepped in as interim head coach for the Crimson. With Crowell behind the bench, the team finished second in the ECAC and made it to the semi-finals of the ECAC tournament. They went on to the quarterfinals of the NCAA playoffs.

After Stone's return, Crowell was associate head coach for the 2014-15 season.

=== Minnesota Duluth Bulldogs ===
Crowell was hired as head coach of the Bulldogs in 2015, after long-time head coach Shannon Miller's contract was not renewed. Very quickly, Crowell had success. In her second season, the team finished 25-7-5. The Bulldogs defeated Bemidji State in the quarterfinals of the WCHA playoffs, to make the WCHA Final Face-Off. They lost against Wisconsin by a score of 1-4, but earned a spot in the NCAA playoffs for the first time since 2011. In recognition of the team's success, Crowell won the USCHO Division I Women's Coach of the Year award. She was also recognized as the WCHA Coach of the Year and the AHCA Coach of the Year. In five years with the team, Crowell has built a winning program, but is still seeking to win a national championship.

=== Dartmouth Big Green ===
On May 31, 2024, Crowell was named head coach at Dartmouth.

=== Team USA ===
Crowell was selected as head coach for the U.S. National Women's U-18 ice hockey team in 2018-2019 and 2019- 2020. In her second season behind the bench, the US women's team won gold at the 2020 IHF U-18 World Championships in Bratislava, Slovakia. Team USA played arch-rivals Team Canada in the gold medal game, winning in overtime by a score of 2-1. Prior to taking on head coaching responsibilities, Crowell was an assistant coach with the US U-18 team in 2015-16 and 2017-28.

In 2020, University of Minnesota Duluth men's ice hockey coach Scott Sandelin was the head coach for the US Men’s Juniors Team, playing in the World Championships in the Czech Republic. It was the first time two coaches from the same Division I school were both coaching US national teams at the same time.

Crowell was listed as one of 20 notable people under 40 by the Duluth News Tribune.

== Head coaching record ==
Record table
Season	Team	Overall	Conference	Standing	Postseason
UMass Boston (ECAC East) (2005–2010)
2005–06	UMass Boston	12–6–1			
2006–07	UMass Boston	14–12–1			
2007–08	UMass Boston	14–12–0			
2008–09	UMass Boston	13–11–2			
2009–10	UMass Boston	17–10–0			
UMass Boston:		70–51–4			
Harvard (ECAC Hockey) (2013–2014)
2013–14	Harvard	23–7–4	16–3–3	2nd	NCAA first round
Harvard:		23–7–4	16–3–3		
Minnesota Duluth (Western Collegiate Hockey Association) (2015–2024)
2015–16	Minnesota Duluth	15–21–1	10–17–1	6th	WCHA Semifinals
2016–17	Minnesota Duluth	25–7–5	19–5–4	3rd	NCAA Quarterfinals
2017–18	Minnesota Dululth	15–16–4	10–11–3	4th	
2018–19	Minnesota Duluth	15–16–4	9–11–4	4th	
2019–20	Minnesota Duluth	18–12–6	11–8–5	4th	
2020–21	Minnesota Duluth	12–7–0	11–5–0	2nd	NCAA Semifinals
2021–22	Minnesota Duluth	27–12–1	19–8–1	4th	NCAA Runner-up
2022–23	Minnesota Duluth	26–10–3	17–8–3	4th	NCAA Quarterfinals
2023–24	Minnesota Duluth	21–14–4	15–11–2	4th	NCAA Quarterfinals
Minnesota Duluth:		174–115–25	121–84–23		
Dartmouth (ECAC Hockey) (2024–present)
2024–25	Dartmouth	5–21–3	3–16–3	11th	
Dartmouth:		5–21–3	3–16–3		
Total:		272–194–36			
National champion Postseason invitational champion Conference regular season champion Conference regular season and conference tournament champion Division regular season champion Division regular season and conference tournament champion Conference tournament champion

== See also ==
- List of college women's ice hockey career coaching wins leaders
