= Sarah Devens =

American ice hockey player (1973–1995)

Sarah McKnight Devens (November 17, 1973 – July 10, 1995) was an ice hockey player for the Dartmouth Big Green women's ice hockey program. The Sarah Devens Award for the player who best "demonstrates leadership and commitment both on and off the ice" is named in her honor. In addition to ice hockey, she also participated on Dartmouth's field hockey and lacrosse teams and was named a captain of all three.

== Early life ==
Devens grew up in Essex, 45 minutes north of Boston. One of her ancestors is Charles Devens, a major general in the Union Army during the United States Civil War. He would later become a United States Attorney General. A statue of General Devens stands at the Esplanade near the Charles River in Boston. Her paternal grandfather, Charlie Devens, pitched for the New York Yankees in the early 1930s. Her mother, Sally Willard, coached Sarah in both field hockey and lacrosse in elementary school.

She attended Shore Country Day School in Beverly, Massachusetts, from kindergarten through grade 9. In junior high, Devens was the captain of the boys' hockey team. At her boarding school, St. Paul's School, in Concord, New Hampshire, she was twice named the outstanding female athlete. She captained the field hockey, ice hockey and lacrosse teams.

== Dartmouth ==
At Dartmouth, Devens participated on three varsity teams: field hockey, ice hockey and lacrosse. She was named a captain of all three teams. She was considered by many teammates to be the best female athlete Dartmouth ever had. She was nicknamed "The Devil", for her ability to outlast other athletes in exercise routines. In her sophomore year, she was the co-winner of the Class of '76 Award at Dartmouth. As of the 2009–10 Dartmouth Big Green women's ice hockey season, Devens ranked 23rd in all-time scoring among Big Green women's ice hockey players.

=== Fatigue ===
In January 1995, Devens tried out for the United States women's national hockey team in Lake Placid, New York, but she did not make the team. In early July 1995, she returned from a field hockey camp in Maryland. Her goal was to qualify for the 1996 US Olympic Field Hockey team. Devens had made the U.S. "B" team, but she felt disappointed and depressed by this result.

Devens expressed to teammates that she was exhausted and she wanted to take a break. In an interview with The Dartmouth school paper in the summer of 1994, Devens stated that she sometimes felt she was missing out on things by participating in three Division I sports. Lacrosse was her least favorite sport, but she felt obligated to continue. During the 1994–95 season, she was an All-American in lacrosse.

== Death ==
On July 10, 1995, Devens invited her friend Maura Schneider to go mountain biking. When Devens did not show, a different friend went to the Devens family home in Essex, Massachusetts, and found her body. Devens took a .22-caliber rifle and killed herself with a shot to the chest. Devens was 21 years of age and scheduled to start her senior year in college.

== Awards and honors ==
- Dartmouth Class of '76 Award (presented annually to the best female athlete at Dartmouth)
- All-America selection, Lacrosse
- First-team All-Ivy League in field hockey (1993)
- First-team All-Ivy League in field hockey (1994)
- Second team All-Ivy League in ice hockey
