= Aleca Hughes =

American ice hockey player

- Born: April 5, 1990 (age 36) Lake Forest, IL, USA
- Height: 5 ft 10 in (178 cm)
- Position: Forward
- Shoots: Right
- ECAC team: Yale
- Playing career: 2008–present

Aleca Hughes (born April 5, 1990) was the captain of the Yale Bulldogs during the 2011–12 Yale Bulldogs women's ice hockey season. For her work in trying to help find a donor for Mandi Schwartz, she was a finalist for the 2011 Hockey Humanitarian Award. In 2012, she won the Coach Wooden Citizenship Cup, Hockey Humanitarian Award, and the Sarah Devens Award. She was the first member of the Ivy League to win the Coach Wooden Citizenship Cup.

== Playing career ==
=== Yale ===
Her freshman season with the Yale Bulldogs was in 2008-09 and she was recognized as a member of the ECAC All-Academic team. She skated on the same line with Mandi Schwartz to begin her freshman season. Her seven goals ranked third on the team, while her sixteen points ranked fourth. For the season, she only incurred four penalties. The following season (2009–10), Hughes nine goals and seventeen points ranked second on the team, while she was named to the ECAC All-Academic team for the second consecutive season. In the 2010–11 season, Hughes led the Yale Bulldogs with 10 goals.

On April 22, 2011, Hughes was elected captain of the Bulldogs team for the 2011–12 season. She became the 31st different person to captain the Yale women's ice hockey team during its 35-year varsity history. On November 5, 2011, she assisted on Stephanie Mock's first career NCAA goal in a 7–1 loss to Princeton. In her final season, she led the team in assists (11) and points (15). In addition, Hughes was her team's representative for Yale Athletics' Thomas W. Ford '42 Community Outreach Program.

Hughes did not miss a game in her career with Yale. Statistically, she finished with 30 goals and 31 assists (61 points) in 116 games played. She was the Bulldogs leader in goals scored (a career-high 10) during the 2010-11 campaign. She is in Yale's career top 20 for goals (20th), assists (tied, 19th) and points (20th). She won Yale's Mandi Schwartz Award for courage, grit and determination on two separate occasions.

=== USA Hockey ===
Hughes attended USA Hockey's open tryouts for the 2010 Olympic team in the summer of 2009.

== Awards and honors ==
- 2005-06 All-Founder's League
- 2006-07 All-Founder's League
- 2007-08 All-New England Division I team (with Hotchkiss)
- ECAC Hockey All-Academic 2008–09, 2009–10
- 2010 Yale Bulldog Award (for team spirit)
- Finalist, 2011 Hockey Humanitarian Award
- 2011 Mandi Schwartz Award (inaugural winner)
- 2012 ECAC Hockey All-Academic honor
- Winner, 2012 Hockey Humanitarian Award
- 2012 Sarah Devens Award
- Nominee, 2012 National Consortium for Academics and Sports Giant Steps Award
- Winner, Coach Wooden Citizenship Cup (presented for character and leadership on and off the field, and to their contributions in sport and society)
- 2012 Bingham Cup (Yale Bulldogs women's ice hockey award for leadership)

== Career stats ==
=== NCAA ===
Season	GP	Goals	Assists	Pts	PIM	PPG	SHG	GWG	ESG
2008-2009	29	7	9	16	8	2	0	2	0
2009-2010	29	9	8	17	22	2	0	1	1
2010-2011	29	10	3	13	12	1	1	1	1
2011-2012	29	4	11	15	14	1	0	0	0

== Personal ==
George Hughes, her father, played hockey for the Harvard Crimson and ranked seventh on the Harvard career scoring list with 161 points. Her uncle, Jack, played for Harvard and the Colorado Rockies of the National Hockey League. Her mother, Allison competed athletically for Boston University. In addition, Hughes has two brothers, George and Gunnar, who play hockey at St. Lawrence.

Hughes was involved in charity work while at Yale. She organized a bone marrow donor drive and the Goals for Mandi fundraiser for teammate Mandi Schwartz. She also organized the Nov. 12, 2010 White Out for Mandi fundraiser at Ingalls Rink, which raised more than $15,500. In addition, she served as the Yale women's ice hockey team's representative for the Yale Athletic Department's Thomas W. Ford '42 Community Outreach Program. She is also a member of Athletes in Action, a group of Christian athletes that performs community service initiatives.
