= Amy Scheer =

American professional sports executive

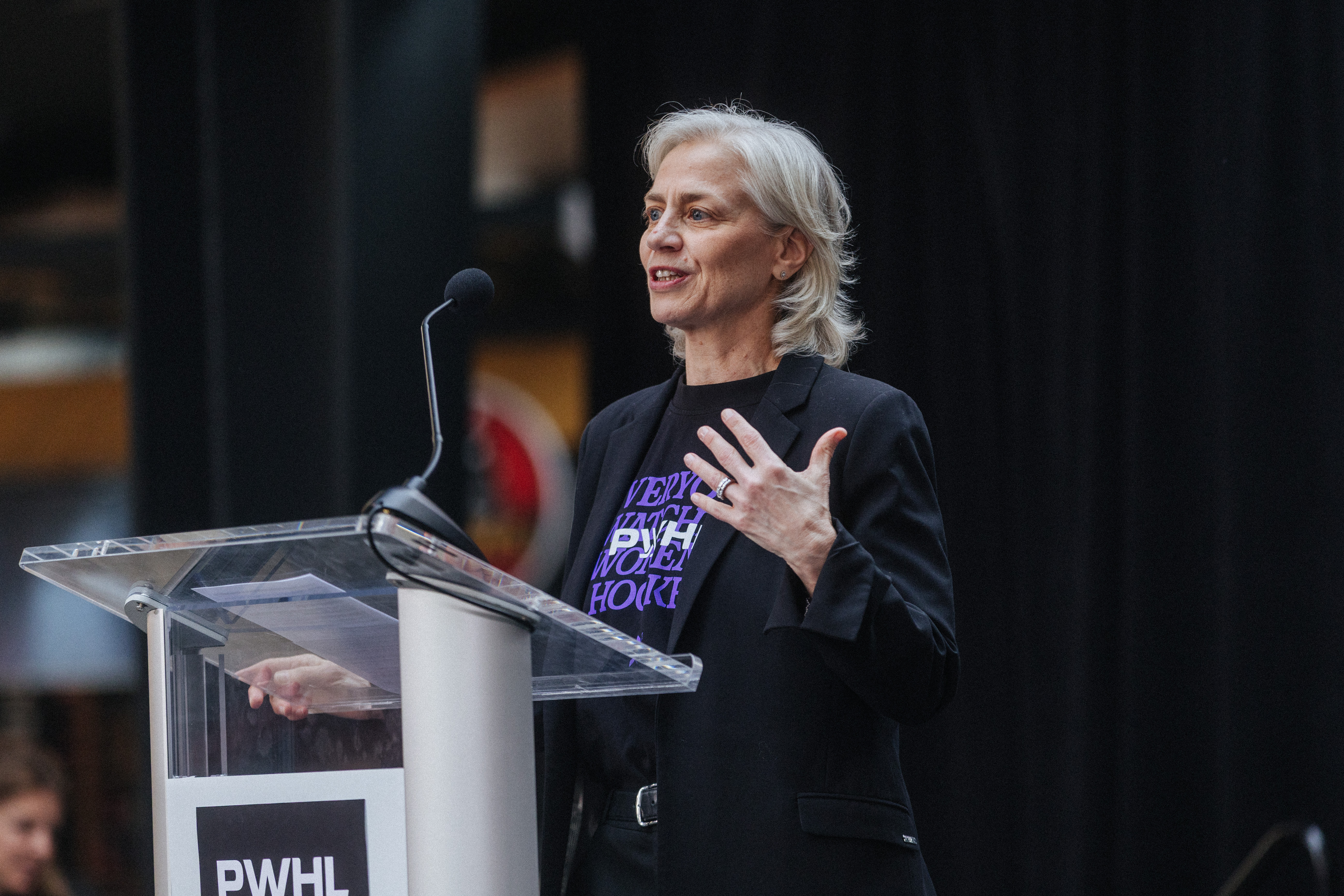
- Scheer in 2026

Personal information
- Born: Amy Scheer
- Occupation: Ice hockey executive
- Employer: Professional Women's Hockey League

Amy Scheer is an American professional sports executive currently serving as Senior Vice President of Business Operations for the Professional Women's Hockey League (PWHL). She previously served as general manager of the Connecticut Whale of the Premier Hockey Federation (PHF), as well as an executive for several teams in the northeastern United States including the WNBA's New York Liberty and the MLS's New York Red Bulls.

== Career ==
Growing up in Fair Lawn, New Jersey, she played tennis in her youth, graduated from Fair Lawn High School and attended the University of Massachusetts Amherst, earning a degree in sports management.

In 2001, she began a position as a vice-president for the New York Liberty in the Women's National Basketball Association (WNBA). During her time with the Liberty, ticket sales increased by over 130%.

She then spent time working as vice president, marketing and brand development for the New York City FC. In 2015, she was named Chief Commercial Officer of the New York Red Bulls of the MLS. Later in the 2010s, she consulted for the Madison Square Garden Company and Rugby United New York of Major League Rugby.

She was named one of WISE New York City's Women of Inspiration in 2017.

In August 2020, she was hired as general manager of the PHF's Connecticut Whale, taking over from Bray Ketchum, who had chosen to focus on her teaching career outside of sports.

She has been a resident of Fort Lee, New Jersey.
