= Charlie Devens =

American baseball player (1910-2003)

- Pitcher
- Born: January 1, 1910; Milton, Massachusetts, U.S.
- Died: August 13, 2003 (aged 93); Scarborough, Maine, U.S.
- Batted: Right Threw: Right

MLB debut
- September 24, 1932, for the New York Yankees

Last MLB appearance
- September 26, 1934, for the New York Yankees

MLB statistics
- Win–loss record: 5–3
- Earned run average: 3.73
- Strikeouts: 31
- Stats at Baseball Reference

Teams
- New York Yankees (1932–1934)

Career highlights and awards
- World Series champion (1932)

Charles Devens (January 1, 1910 – August 13, 2003) was an American Major League Baseball pitcher who played from 1932-1934. After pitching for Harvard he was signed in 1932 to the New York Yankees. At 92 years of age, Devens was the oldest surviving member of the famed 1932 world championship Yankees team and recalled with great detail the now famous Babe Ruth's Called Shot.

== Career ==
Signed in 1932 and leaving the team in 1934, Devens' Major league career was cut short by his future father-in-law who refused to have a ball player as a son in law. Devens spent the entire 1932 season on the champion Yankees' roster, despite only pitching one game that season, due to a promise the Yankees made to Devens' father as a condition for signing him. After his departure from the big leagues Devens established his reputation as a standout businessman in Boston. Given his short 3-year career Charlie Devens was only able to amass 82 innings pitched with only one start in 1934. At the conclusion of his career, Charlie held a 5–3 record with 31 strikeouts and a 3.73 ERA in 16 games pitched.

== Personal ==
His granddaughter was Sarah Devens. She participated on three varsity teams at Dartmouth College: field hockey, ice hockey and lacrosse. She was named a captain of all three teams and was considered by many teammates to be the best female athlete Dartmouth ever had.
