= Katie Weatherston =

Canadian ice hockey player

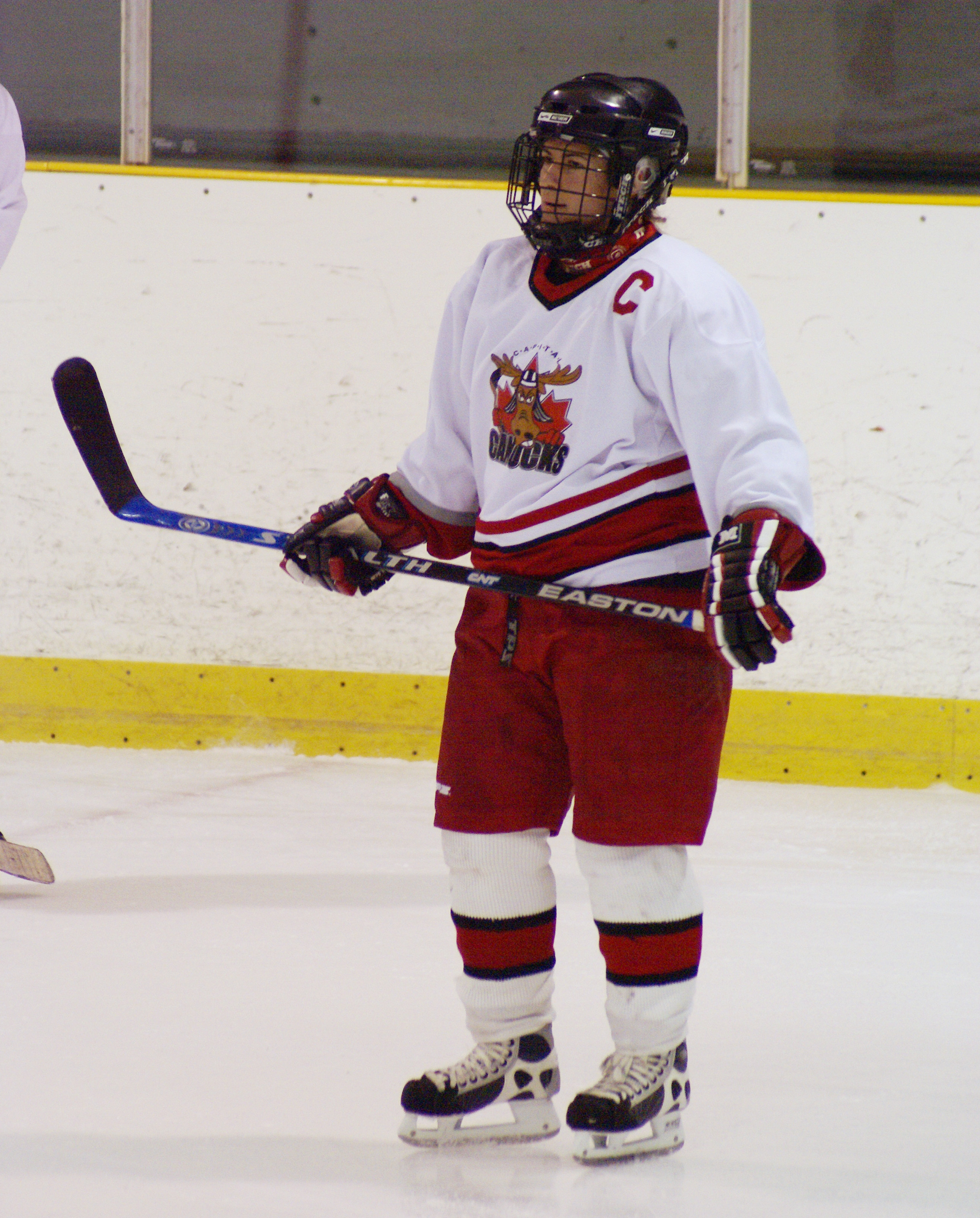
- Born: April 6, 1983 (age 43) Thunder Bay, Ontario, Canada
- Height: 5 ft 2 in (157 cm)
- Weight: 134 lb (61 kg; 9 st 8 lb)
- Position: Forward
- Shot: Right
- Played for: Stars de Montréal; Ottawa Capital Canucks; Dartmouth Big Green
- National team: Canada
- Playing career: 2002–2008
- Website: katieweatherston.com
Medal record
Women's ice hockey
Representing Canada
Olympic Games
Gold medal – first place	2006 Turin	Tournament
World Championships
Gold medal – first place	2007 Canada
Silver medal – second place	2008 China

Katherine Marie "Katie" Weatherston (born April 6, 1983) is a Canadian retired ice hockey player and head coach of the Lebanese women’s national ice hockey team. As a member of the Canadian women's national ice hockey team, she won Olympic gold in the women's ice hockey tournament at the 2006 Winter Olympics in Turin and medalled at two IIHF Women's World Championships.

== Playing career ==
Weatherston played four years of college ice hockey with the Dartmouth Big Green women's ice hockey program in the ECAC Hockey conference of the NCAA Division I, from 2002 to 2005 and for the 2006–07 season.

She debuted with the Canadian national team at the 2004 Four Nations Cup. For the 2005–06 school year, Weatherston opted to put her college career on hold in order to focus entirely on preparing to represent Canada at the 2006 Winter Olympics.

After completing her college eligibility with Dartmouth, Weatherston played the 2007–08 season in the Canadian Women's Hockey League (CWHL). She began the season with the Ottawa Capital Canucks but transferred to and finished the season with the Montréal Stars.

In 2009, Weatherston sustained a concussion during a pick up hockey game. It was not her first concussion but, unlike previous instances, her post-concussion symptoms lingered for over two years – dashing her hopes of participating in the 2010 Winter Olympics and bringing an early end to her playing career.

== Personal life ==
Weatherston was born on April 6, 1983, in Thunder Bay, Ontario, to David and Anna Weatherston. She has a bachelor’s degree in psychology from Dartmouth College.

== Career statistics ==
=== Regular season and playoffs ===
			Regular season					Playoffs
Season	Team	League	GP	G	A	Pts	PIM	GP	G	A	Pts	PIM
2002–03	Dartmouth Big Green	NCAA	35	23	24	47	14	–	–	–	–	—
2003–04	Dartmouth Big Green	NCAA	32	29	19	48	22	–	–	–	–	—
2004–05	Dartmouth Big Green	NCAA	31	38	15	53	22	–	–	–	–	—
2006–07	Dartmouth Big Green	NCAA	26	23	14	37	16	–	–	–	–	—
2007–08	Ottawa Capital Canucks	CWHL	15	13	7	20	40	–	–	–	–	—
2007–08	Stars de Montréal	CWHL	2	2	4	6	4	2	2	1	3	10
NCAA totals			124	113	72	185	74	–	–	–	–	—
CWHL totals			17	15	11	26	44	2	2	1	3	10

Source: USCHO, Elite Prospects

=== International ===
Year	Team	Event	Result	GP	G	A	Pts	PIM
2006	Canada	OG	1st place, gold medalist(s)	5	4	1	5	2
2007	Canada	WW	1st place, gold medalist(s)	5	3	1	4	0
2008	Canada	WW	2nd place, silver medalist(s)	5	2	0	2	2
Senior totals				15	9	2	11	4

== Awards and honours ==
- 2003 ECAC All-Rookie Team
- 2003 All-Ivy Rookie Team
- 2003 ECAC All-Star Honourable Mention
- 2004–05 New England Writers Association Team
- 2004–05 All-Ivy Second Team
- 2004–05 All-USCHO Third Team
- 2006-07 ECAC Coaches Preseason All-League Selection
- 2006-07 ECAC Media Preseason All-League Selection
- 2007 ECAC Tournament Most Valuable Player
- 2008 Canadian Women's Hockey League Eastern Division All-Star
- 2008 Canadian Women's Hockey League All-Rookie Team
