= Sarah Devens Award =

The Sarah Devens Award is given as a joint award between the ECAC Hockey and Hockey East conferences to a women's ice hockey player. The criteria for the Devens Award is for a player who demonstrates leadership and commitment both on and off the ice. Both conferences submitted a league nominee for consideration and the winner is also given a post-graduate scholarship of $10,000. The award is named in honor of former Dartmouth Big Green ice hockey player, Sarah Devens, who died in 1995 prior to her senior year.

== List of winners ==
Year	Player	School
1996–97	Kathryn Waldo	Northeastern
1997–98	Sarah Hood	Dartmouth
1998–99	Jaime Totten	Northeastern
1999–2000	Carrie Jokiel	New Hampshire
2000–01	Christina Sorbara	Brown
2001–02	Dianna Bell	Cornell
2002–03	Rachel Barrie	St. Lawrence
2003–04	Lindsay Charlebois	Harvard
2004–05	Nicole Corriero	Harvard
2005–06	Karen Thatcher	Providence
2006–07	Lindsay Williams	Clarkson
2007–08	Lizzie Keady	Princeton
2008–09	Marianna Locke	St. Lawrence
2009–10	Laura Gersten	Rensselaer
2010–11	Jaclyn Snikeris	Yale
2011–12	Aleca Hughes	Yale
2012–13	Alyssa Zupon	Yale
2013–14	Vanessa Gagnon	Clarkson
2014–15	Chelsea Laden	Quinnipiac
2015–16	Alli Rolandelli	Brown
2016–17	Paula Voorheis	Cornell
2017–18	Taylor Willard	Vermont
2018–19	Mackenzie Lancaster	Quinnipiac
2019–20	Sammy Davis	Boston University
2020–21	Grace Markey	Quinnipiac
2021–22	Gianna Meloni	Yale
2022–23	Carly Beniek	Holy Cross
2023–24	Elle Hartje	Yale
2024–25	Sarah Thompson	St. Lawrence
2025–26	Lulu Rourke	Holy Cross

== See also ==
- National Collegiate Women's Ice Hockey Championship
