= Correne Bredin =

Canadian ice hockey player

- Born: February 11, 1980 (age 46) Warburg, Alberta, Canada
- Height: 5 ft 11 in (180 cm)
- Weight: 190 lb (86 kg; 13 st 8 lb)
- Position: Forward
- Shot: Left
- ECAC WWHL team: Dartmouth; Strathmore Rockies
- National team: Canada
- Playing career: 1998–2010
Medal record
Representing Canada
Women's ice hockey
IIHF World Women's Championships
Gold medal – first place	2001 United States	Tournament
Silver medal – second place	2005 Sweden	Tournament
Women's 4 Nations Cup
Gold medal – first place	2001 Canada	Tournament
Gold medal – first place	2004 Canada	Tournament
Gold medal – first place	2005 Finland	Tournament
Gold medal – first place	2007 Canada	Tournament
Silver medal – second place	2003 Sweden	Tournament

Correne (Bredin) Taves (born February 11, 1980) was a member of the Canadian National women's Under 22 team from 1999 to 2001, and a member of the Canadian National women's senior team from 2001 to 2007. Twice, she was an alternate to the Canadian Olympic women's ice hockey team (2002 and 2006, respectively).

== Playing career ==
Bredin competed for many years in the Western Women's Hockey League. The first team she competed with was the Edmonton Chimos from 1996 to 1998. In 1997, she was part of the Chimos squad that claimed the Canadian National women's ice hockey championship. She would help the Calgary Oval X-Treme claim several championships, including the 2004 NWHL, 2005 and 2007 WWHL, and 2007 Canadian national championships. Her final season in the WWHL came in 2007–08, when she played on the Strathmore Rockies inaugural entry in the WWHL.

In 1998, Bredin joined the NCAA's Dartmouth Big Green and finished her career as the most decorated defensive player in the school's history. Bredin broke the school record for the most career goals by a defender. As of 2011, Bredin still held the Dartmouth record for the most career goals by a defenseman with 44, the second-most career assists by a defenseman with 93 and the second-most career points by a defenseman with 137.

From 2008 to 2010, she played with the Moscow Tornado in the Russian Professional League. Bredin captured the 2009 Russian League Championship and 2010 European Champions Cup.

== IIHF ==
As part of the IIHF Ambassador and Mentor Program, Bredin was a Hockey Canada athlete ambassador that travelled to Bratislava, Slovakia to participate in the 2011 IIHF High Performance Women's Camp from July 4–12.

== Personal life ==
Bredin's cousin is American basketball player Mac McClung. Her sister Colette Bredin is also a pro hockey player.

== Career stats ==
Bredin player profile from Hockey Canada:

Event	Games Played	Goals	Assists	Points	PIM
2004 Esso Women's Nationals	6	1	3	4	0
2004 Four Nations Cup	4	1	0	1	2
2007 Canada Evaluation Camp	3	0	0	0	2
2007 Esso Women's Nationals	6	1	6	7	2
2007 Four Nations Cup	4	1	0	1	2
