= Mandi Schwartz =

Canadian ice hockey player (1988–2011)

- Born: February 3, 1988; Yorkton, Saskatchewan, Canada
- Died: April 3, 2011 (aged 23); Regina, Saskatchewan, Canada
- Education: Athol Murray College of Notre Dame
- Alma mater: Yale University
- Relatives: Jaden Schwartz (brother); Rylan Schwartz (brother)

Mandi Jocelyn Schwartz (February 3, 1988 – April 3, 2011) was a Canadian ice hockey player with the Yale Bulldogs. She was a three time Eastern College Athletic Conference (ECAC) Hockey All-Academic, and played 73 consecutive games with the team before being diagnosed with acute myeloid leukemia in December 2008. Prior to joining Yale University, Schwartz had played minor hockey for Athol Murray College of Notre Dame in Saskatchewan. Her younger brother, Jaden currently plays for the Colorado Avalanche in the National Hockey League. Her brother Rylan currently plays for Glasgow Clan of the Elite Ice Hockey League in Great Britain.

After her diagnosis, bone marrow drives were held at Yale and in Canada. These drives did not result in a match for Schwartz, though they did result in six matches for other patients on the registry who were waiting for a transplant. As of February 1, 2018, 39 bone marrow matches have resulted from drives conducted at Yale University alone. Schwartz underwent a stem cell transplant from donated umbilical cord blood in September 2010. In December 2010, her cancer returned and she discontinued most forms of treatment. Schwartz died in Regina, Saskatchewan, at the age of 23. After her death, the ECAC hockey rookie of the year award was renamed in her honour, and an annual women's hockey tournament is named after her in Saskatchewan. Her family and Yale University have continued to support drives to identify bone marrow donors after her death.

== Hockey career ==
Schwartz played minor hockey at Athol Murray College of Notre Dame in Wilcox, Saskatchewan, and served as team captain. While at Notre Dame, her team captured the provincial championship for Saskatchewan three times, and went on to win the Western Canada championships each of those three years. Schwartz attended evaluation camps for Canadian national women's ice hockey team hosted by Hockey Canada. In 2003, she played for Saskatchewan at the 2003 Canada Games, and helped capture a bronze medal.

She joined the Yale Bulldogs after graduating high school in 2006. Schwartz played 2 full seasons and part of a third at Yale University, before being diagnosed with leukemia. During her freshman season in 2006-07, she played in all 31 of her team's games, scoring 5 goals and adding 8 assists. She was an ECAC Hockey All-Academic during the three seasons she played. As a sophomore, Schwartz played in 31 games, scoring 4 goals and adding 10 assists. Her ten assists were third most on her team that season. At the start of her junior season, Schwartz had played in 11 games before being diagnosed with leukemia. She tallied one assist during those games, but seemed to be struggling with her endurance, despite being in excellent shape. Schwartz was initially diagnosed with anemia, but received the diagnosis of acute myeloid leukemia the following day. At the time she was forced to leave her team due to her illness, she had played in 73 consecutive games for the Yale Bulldogs.

== Illness and death ==
Schwartz was diagnosed with acute myeloid leukemia in December 2008, during her junior year at Yale. She had been sick for much of the fall semester, but attributed it to stress and an initial diagnosis of anemia. She was diagnosed on December 8, 2008. She started treatment for her cancer in December 2008 and was able to briefly return to school and began practicing with the hockey team again in January 2010. In April 2010, she received word that her cancer had returned and was forced to leave school.

Doctors had decided that Schwartz's best option for treatment would be either a cord blood or bone marrow transplant. In the hopes of finding a match, bone marrow drives were organized at Yale University and at several locations throughout Canada. In the first two years Yale University hosted drives, they added more than 1600 potential donors. These bone marrow drives did not result in a match for Schwartz, but doctors found a suitable donor from umbilical cord blood. In September 2010, Schwartz underwent the transplant in Seattle. Her cancer went into remission after the transplant, but returned again in December 2010. Shortly after this, Schwartz decided to discontinue most forms of treatment. Rather than hoping for a cure, Schwartz continued with palliative chemotherapy designed to minimize her symptoms. On April 2, 2011, she entered a Regina hospital and died the following day.

== Personal life ==
Schwartz was the daughter of Rick and Carol Schwartz. Brothers Jaden and Rylan both played for the Colorado College men's ice hockey team. Jaden was a first round draft pick of the St. Louis Blues in the 2010 NHL entry draft, and currently plays for the Seattle Kraken. Jaden, having previously worn the number 9 during his first two years with the Blues, switched to number 17 as a tribute to his older sister; it was the number she wore on ice. Her brother Rylan has played in six leagues over the course of his professional hockey career, currently playing the 2020/21 season with the Lausitzer Foxes of the German DEL2. Her and partner Kaylem Prefontaine planned to marry in 2012.

== Legacy ==
Yale University has made bone marrow drives an annual event on campus. The first two drives signed up over 1,600 potential donors. The 2011 drive was held in April, shortly after Schwartz's death. Shortly after the event, it was announced that the drive had unofficially signed up almost 900 potential donors. Although the school's drives did not find a match for Schwartz, they have generated 28 other matches for patients who required a bone marrow transplant. The success of Yale's bone marrow drives is statistically unlikely, according to Sam Rubin who works in Yale's sports publicity department. Rubin stated, "Usually, it takes tens of thousands of people to get one match. It's like looking for a needle in a haystack."

ECAC Hockey renamed its Student-Athlete of the Year Award in memory of Mandi Schwartz. The announcement was made on the day of what would have been Mandi's 24th birthday. "ECAC Hockey's Mandi Schwartz Student-Athlete of the Year Award goes to a student-athlete who excels in the classroom, participates in fifty percent of the team's games, and demonstrates leadership on and off the ice. Each head coach nominates a student-athlete, and a committee made up of school administrators has the task of selecting the recipient." Schwartz's high school, Athol Murray College of Notre Dame, in Wilcox, Saskatchewan hosts the Mandi Schwartz Memorial Tournament annually. It is advertised as the biggest female hockey tournament in western Canada.
