= Gillian Apps =

Canadian ice hockey player (born 1983)

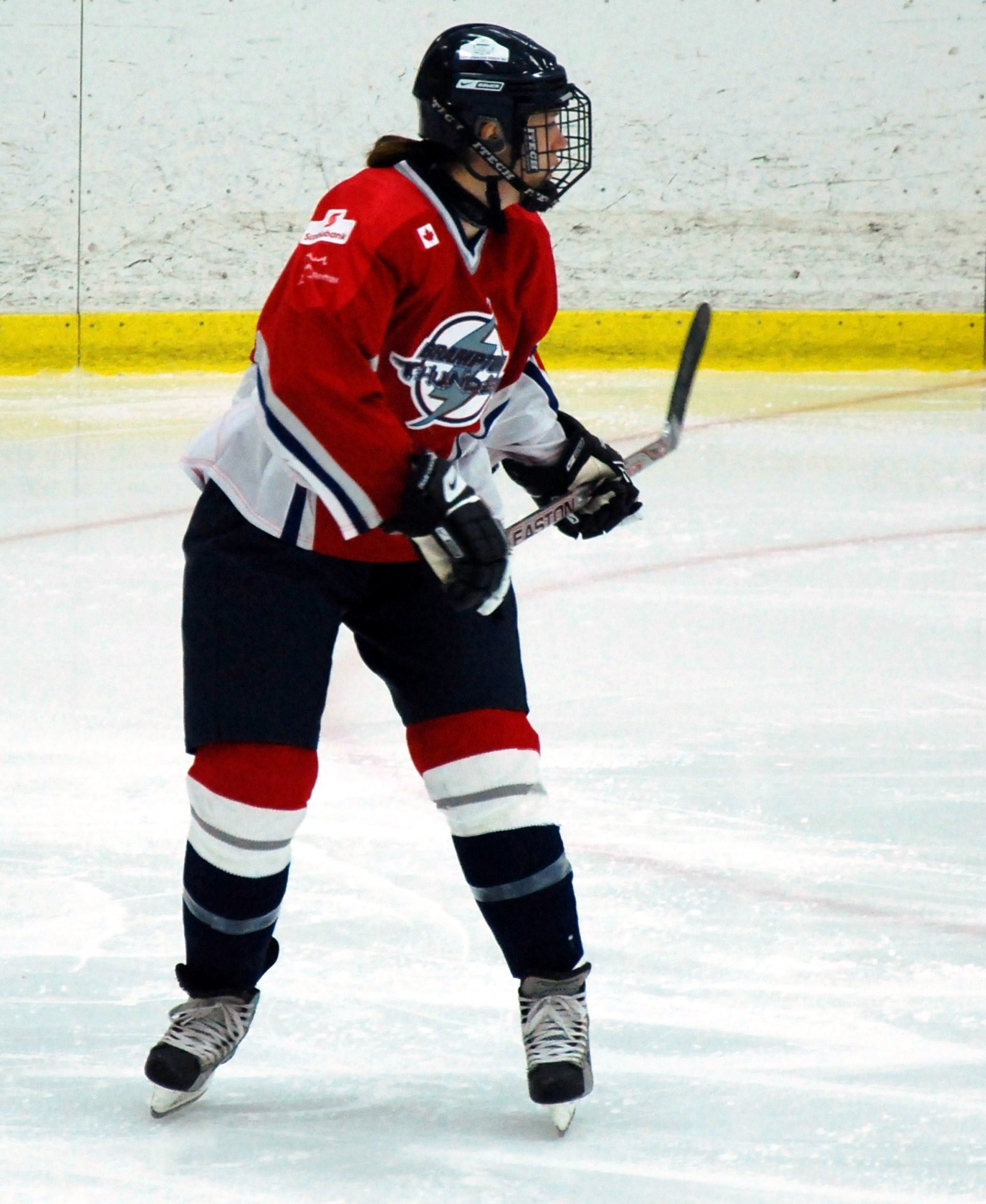
- Apps in action for Brampton Thunder, 2009
- Born: November 2, 1983 (age 43) North York, Ontario, Canada
- Height: 6 ft 0 in (183 cm)
- Weight: 180 lb (82 kg; 12 st 12 lb)
- Position: Forward
- Shot: Left
- ECAC CWHL team: Dartmouth (2002–07); Brampton Thunder
- National team: Canada
- Playing career: 2001–2015
Medal record
Representing Canada
Women's ice hockey
Olympic Games
Gold medal – first place	2006 Turin	Tournament
Gold medal – first place	2010 Vancouver	Tournament
Gold medal – first place	2014 Sochi	Tournament
IIHF World Women's Championships
Gold medal – first place	2004 Canada	Tournament
Gold medal – first place	2007 Canada	Tournament
Gold medal – first place	2012 United States	Tournament
Silver medal – second place	2005 Sweden	Tournament
Silver medal – second place	2008 China	Tournament
Silver medal – second place	2009 Finland	Tournament
Silver medal – second place	2011 Switzerland	Tournament
Silver medal – second place	2013 Canada	Tournament
4 Nations Cup
Gold medal – first place	2010 Canada	Tournament
Silver medal – second place	2011 Sweden	Tournament
MLP Nations Cup
Gold medal – first place	2005 Germany	Tournament

Gillian Mary Apps (born November 2, 1983) is a women's ice hockey player. Apps was a member of the Canadian National Hockey Team that won back to back gold medals in three consecutive Olympic Games.

As a psychology major at Dartmouth College in Hanover, New Hampshire, United States, Apps was a member of her college's ice hockey team, competing in ECAC women's ice hockey. She was a member of the Canada women's national ice hockey team, winning gold medals at the 2006 Winter Olympics in Turin, Italy, the 2010 Winter Olympics in Vancouver, British Columbia, Canada and the 2014 Winter Olympics in Sochi, Russia. She was also a winner of gold medals with Team Canada at the 2004 and 2007 World Ice Hockey Championships, and silver medals in that event in 2005, 2008, 2009, 2011 and 2013.

Apps was a member of the Brampton Thunder in the Canadian Women's Hockey League until 2015 at which point she announced her retirement from professional women's hockey. Apps resides in Unionville, Ontario.

== Playing career ==
- She graduated from Havergal College in Toronto in 2001, and played for the Toronto Aeros. During the 2000–01 NWHL season, Apps played with the Beatrice Aeros and finished tied for fifth in league scoring with 42 points. In 2001–02, Apps was a member of the Beatrice Aeros and won the Ontario senior women's hockey championship.
- At the first National Women's Under-18 Hockey Challenge in 2001 at Trois-Rivières, Quebec, Apps was the captain of the gold medal-winning Ontario Red squad. She made Canada's national women's team only months later, as an 18-year-old.
- As a freshman with the Dartmouth Big Green women's ice hockey program in 2002, Apps accumulated 22 goals, 13 assists and 35 points. Apps ranked fourth on the Big Green in scoring. She was on an All-Freshman line with Tiffany Hagge and Cherie Piper.
- On October 21, 2012, Apps would score the game-winning goal in a 4–3 overtime win against the Toronto Furies. The goal provided Florence Schelling with the first win of her CWHL career, which was also her CWHL debut.
- On August 30, 2015, Apps completed the Muskoka Ironman triathlon in just under 15 hours. In September 2015 she retired from the Canadian women's team, after sitting out the 2014–2015 season from both the national team and her CWHL team, the Brampton Thunder. Apps finished her national team career with 50 goals and 50 assists for an even 100 points in 164 games, and ranks second all-time on the Canadian team in penalty minutes behind Hayley Wickenheiser with 255. She is involved with She Swings She Scores, a joint initiative between the Ontario Women's Hockey Association and the Golf Association of Ontario to encourage girls to take up golf as well as hockey.

== Coaching career ==
In the autumn of 2016, Apps joined Katie King's coaching staff with the Boston College Eagles women's ice hockey program.

== Career stats ==
=== Dartmouth ===
Year	Games Played	Goals	Assists	Points	PIM
2002–03	30	22	13	35	59
2003–04	23	22	13	35	69
2004–05	29	16	26	42	65
2006–07	31	30	16	46	88

=== Hockey Canada ===
Event	Games Played	Goals	Assists	Points	PIM
2004 World Championships	12	:----	0	4	10
2005 World Championships	5	4	2	6	8
2006 Olympics	5	7	7	14	14
2007 World Championships	5	1	3	4	4
2008 World Championships	5	1	0	1	888
2009 World Championships	5	2	1	3	3
2010 Olympics	5	3	4	7	10

== Awards and honours ==
- Honorable mention All-Ivy selection (2003)
- ECAC Hockey League Player of the Week on Nov 3, 2003
- ECAC Hockey League Player of the Week on Nov 24, 2003
- Named All-Ivy League second team (2004)
- Named Honorable mention All-ECAC Hockey League (2004)
- 2006–07 ECAC Coaches Preseason All-League Selection
- 2006–07 ECAC Media Preseason All-League Selection
- ECAC Player of the Year (2007)
- ECAC First-Team all-league honors (2007)
- New England Hockey Writers Most Valuable Player (2007)
- Top 10 Finalist for 2007 Patty Kazmaier Award

== Personal life ==
Apps attended William Berczy Public School in Unionville, Ontario. Apps also participates in snowboarding, wakeboarding, golf, and soccer. She grew up playing girls hockey in the Greater Toronto Area, and attended Havergal College where she excelled as a female athlete. Prior to the 2010 Olympics, Apps worked at the Royal Bank of Canada in an Olympians program, where she was called upon to meet clients or give motivational speeches to employees.

Apps is the granddaughter of Canadian professional ice hockey player for the Toronto Maple Leafs from 1936 to 1948, and Hockey Hall of Fame member Syl Apps, and the daughter of Canadian retired professional ice hockey centre Syl Apps Jr., who played 10 seasons in the National Hockey League for the New York Rangers, Los Angeles Kings and Pittsburgh Penguins. Her brother Syl Apps III was signed as a free agent by the Toronto Maple Leafs on July 22, 1999, although he never played a game with the Maple Leafs. Her sister, Amy was a member of the Canadian National women's soccer team and an OUA All Star in 1998 and 1999. Her cousin, rower Darren Barber, won a gold medal in the men's eight at the 1992 Summer Olympics in Barcelona as a member of the Canadian team. Barber also competed at the 1996 Summer Olympics in Atlanta, where he finished 4th. Apps's sister-in-law is Meaghan Sittler, whose father Darryl Sittler competed in the NHL. She is the aunt to a nephew named Sawyer.

On April 17, 2012, Apps (along with Meghan Agosta, Caroline Ouellette, Courtney Birchard, and head coach Dan Church) took part in the opening face off of the playoff game between the Ottawa Senators and the New York Rangers at ScotiaBank Place.

On September 22, 2018, Apps married American women's hockey player Meghan Duggan. Their son, George, was born on February 29, 2020. They had a daughter, Olivia, in October 2021. Their third child, daughter Sophie, was born on December 31, 2023.
