= Sarah Parsons =

American ice hockey player (born 1987)

Personal information
- Born: July 27, 1987 (age 38)
Medal record
Women's ice hockey
Representing the United States
Olympic Games
Bronze medal – third place	2006 Turin	Tournament
IIHF World Women's Championships
Gold medal – first place	2005 Sweden	Tournament
Gold medal – first place	2008 China	Tournament
Silver medal – second place	2007 Canada	Tournament

Sarah Sturgis Parsons (born July 27, 1987) is an American ice hockey player. She won a bronze medal at the 2006 Winter Olympics. She was a member of Dartmouth College's class of 2010.

== Playing career ==
=== High school ===
She was captain of the varsity hockey team and the team had a 25–2–0 record at the Noble and Greenough School in Dedham, Massachusetts. She was part of a girls' hockey run that has won 11 straight ISL championships. She owns the school record for points in hockey. While in high school, she played for the U.S. Women's Under-22 Team in 2003 and 2004. Besides hockey, Parsons also participated in soccer and is the school's record holder for most goals in a career in soccer. Her soccer team won a New England Class A Championship in 2004.

=== USA Hockey ===
Parsons was supposed to enroll at Dartmouth in 2005 but delayed it so she could participate in the 2006 Winter Olympics. She was the youngest player on the U.S. National Team. She was 17.

=== Dartmouth College ===
As a freshman, Parsons appeared in 32 games and led the Big Green in points (50 – ranked eighth in the NCAA), assists (36 – ranked fourth in the NCAA), and plus-minus (+29). In addition, she led all ECAC rookies in scoring. Her average of 1.56 points per game ranked second in the NCAA among all rookies. Parsons participated in the ECAC championship game. Against St. Lawrence, she scored a goal and registered an assist. In addition, she had seven-game scoring streaks twice during the season. For her efforts, Parsons earned several accolades; she was ECAC Rookie of the Year, first-team all-league, and her teammates voted her the Big Green Rookie of the Year.

During her senior season, Parsons played with a leg injury, but appeared in 30 games and scored a career high in goals with 17. Added to her 15 assists, she finished the season with 32 points. Of her 17 goals, eight were scored on the power play, ranking second overall on the Big Green. Dating back to the previous season, Parsons entered the season with a 12-game scoring streak. In her second game of the 2008–09 season, her streak was snapped against the St. Lawrence Skating Saints. On January 31, 2009, she became the 29th Dartmouth player to notch 100 career points.

== Career stats ==
=== Dartmouth ===
Year	Games played	Goals	Assists	Points	PIM
2006-07	32	14	36	50	6
2007-08	31	15	19	34	14
2008-09	30	17	15	32	12
2009-10	26	18	20	38	14
Career	119	64	90	154	46

== Awards and honors ==
- All-ISL 2002–2005
- ISL's most valuable player from 2002 to 2005
- Prep school athlete of the year (awarded by the Boston Globe)
- Winner of the Noble Shield Award given to the most respected athlete at her school
- Awarded the John Carlton Memorial Award by the Boston Bruins
- Big Green Rookie of the Year (2007)
- ECAC Rookie of the Year (2007)
- ECAC first team all-league (2007)
- ECAC Scoring Leader among rookies (2007)
- ECAC Hockey Tournament's Most Outstanding Player (2009)
