= Yale Bulldogs women's ice hockey =

- Current season
- University: Yale University
- Conference: ECAC
- Head coach: Mark Bolding; 7th season, 71–28–2
- Arena: Ingalls Rink; New Haven, Connecticut
- Colors: Yale Blue and White

NCAA tournament Frozen Four
- 2022

NCAA tournament appearances
- 2022, 2023, 2026

Conference regular season champions
- 2023, 2026

Yale University women's ice hockey (YWIH) is an NCAA Division I varsity ice hockey program at Yale University in New Haven, Connecticut.

They are one of the oldest varsity women's ice hockey programs in the country, Yale women's ice hockey dates going back to 1975. Beginning as a club sport, the program gained varsity team status in 1977–78.

Yale competes in the ECAC Hockey League (ECACHL), along with Ivy League foes Harvard, Princeton, Cornell, Dartmouth and Brown. Both the Yale men's and women's ice-hockey teams play at Ingalls Rink, also known as "The Whale".

== Coaches ==
The current head coach is Mark Bolding, who took over the helm in April 2019. He is the 11th head coach for Yale. In his first season with the team, the Bulldogs set a program record with 17 wins, including 13 conference wins, also a school record, beating the previous record set in 2004–2005. The season included a six-game winning streak, the longest in program history. Bolding came to the Bulldogs after serving as the head coach for the Norwich University women's ice hockey team.

Joakim Flygh coached the Bulldogs from 2010 until 2019. In 2014–2015, the team tied the school's record for conference wins with 12, and finished with the second highest number of goals scored (93). Prior to taking on head coaching responsibilities at Yale, Flygh was an assistant coach at Harvard and University of Minnesota-Duluth. Flygh resigned as head coach in February 2019.

Hilary Witt was the head coach from 2002 to 2010. Witt was named ECAC Women's Coach of the Year in 2002–03, and became Yale's all-time leader in wins in 2005. The 2004–05 squad set the school record for overall wins (16) and conference wins (12), earning a trip to the ECAC semifinals for the first time. The 2007–08 team broke the school record for goals in a season with 96 and finished with the second-most wins in school history, 15.

== History ==
Yale University created its women's ice hockey program in the fall of 1974, under coach John Ormiston, a former Yale varsity captain working in the development office, who volunteered to coach an enthusiastic group of mostly novice players. During its first year, the program had few games, mostly against high school teams. Its first recorded match was on December 9, 1975 versus Choate-Rosemary Hall. The Bulldogs prevailed by a 5–3 tally. Two years later, the Bulldogs hockey program would attain varsity status.

Laurie Belliveau played for Yale from 1994 to 1998. In four years, she participated in 98 games. Statistically, she logged 5,809 minutes, recorded 4,262 saves, and registered a .911 save percentage while posting a 4.32 goals against average. She has averaged more than 43 saves per game. In 1994–95, Belliveau became the first freshman in any sport to earn Ivy League Player of the Year honors. During the season, she made an ECAC record 78 saves in a game. The opponent was the Providence Friars women's ice hockey program.

In 1998, Laurie Belliveau was one of two Ivy League players named first team All-Americans. This was the first time that Ivy League women's hockey players were bestowed such an honor.

Hillary Witt was hired as head coach for the 2002–2003 season, after working as the assistant coach for one season. The Bulldogs had a stand-out year in 2004–2005, with a program high 16 wins overall and 12 conference wins. The following year, they set the all-time record for goals scored. Witt left at the end of the 2009–2010 season.

On April 3, 2011, Yale player Mandi Schwartz succumbed to recurrent acute myeloid leukemia at age 23. She was a forward on Yale's women's hockey team and had a string of 73 consecutive games played. In her honor, the Yale Bulldogs introduced the Mandi Schwartz Award in April 2011. The annual award is given in acknowledgement of a Yale Bulldog player's courage, grit and determination. Aleca Hughes was named as the first winner. On what would have been her 24th birthday, the ECAC renamed its Student-Athlete of the Year Award in honor of Schwartz.

YWIH participates in Bulldog PAWS, a program at Yale New Haven Hospital that teams children with brain tumors with one of the Yale Athletic Teams. In 2011, they adopted a nine-year-old girl, Giana, with a brain tumor; she went to all of their home games. Alyssa Zupon was instrumental in developing the partnership.

The Bulldogs broke the previous program record of wins and conference wins in the 2019–2020 season. They finished 17–15–0 over all, and 13–9–0 in conference play. They played perennial rival Harvard in the quarterfinals of the ECAC tournament. After an opening game loss, they won the second game in overtime. In the tie-breaker, they lost in triple overtime by a score of 3–2.

In July 2020, the Ivy League announced that league play would be suspended in Fall 2020 due to the 20202 coronavirus pandemic.

=== Year by year ===
Won championship	Lost championship	Conference champions	League leader

Year	Coach	W	L	T	Conference	Conf. W	Conf. L	Conf. T	Finish	Conference Tournament	NCAA Tournament
2022–23	Mark Bolding	28	4	1	ECAC	19	2	1	1st ECAC	Won Quarterfinals vs. Harvard (4–2, 4–0); Lost Semifinals vs. Clarkson (3–4 (2OT))	Lost Quarterfinals vs. Northeastern (1–4)
2021–22	Mark Bolding	26	9	1	ECAC	16	5	1	2nd ECAC	Won Quarterfinals vs. St. Lawrence (2–4, 4–2, 3–2); Won Semifinals vs. Princeton (3–1); Lost Championship vs. Colgate (1–2 (OT))	Won Quarterfinals vs. Colgate (2–1 OT); Lost Semifinals vs. Ohio State (1–2)
2020–21	DID NOT PLAY DUE TO COVID-19										
2019–20	Mark Bolding	17	15	0	ECAC	13	9	0	5th ECAC	Lost Quarterfinals vs. Harvard (1–4,4–3 (OT), 3–4 (3OT))	Did not qualify
2018–19	Joakim Flygh	8	18	3	ECAC	7	12	3	9th ECAC	Did not qualify	Did not qualify
2017–18	Joakim Flygh	10	17	4	ECAC	8	12	2	8th ECAC	Lost Quarterfinals vs. Clarkson (1–10, 1–4)	Did not qualify
2016–17	Joakim Flygh	10	17	4	ECAC	8	12	2	7th ECAC	Lost Quarterfinals vs. St. Lawrence (1–4, 0–4)	Did not qualify
2015–16	Joakim Flygh	10	17	2	ECAC	9	11	2	9th ECAC	Did not qualify	Did not qualify
2014–15	Joakim Flygh	15	15	1	ECAC	12	10	0	7th ECAC	Lost Quarterfinals vs. Harvard (1–2, 0–3)	Did not qualify
2013–14	Joakim Flygh	9	16	7	ECAC	6	9	7	7th ECAC	Lost Quarterfinals vs. Harvard (3–2 2OT, 2–3 2OT, 0–4)	Did not qualify
2012–13	Joakim Flygh	5	21	3	ECAC	4	15	3	10th ECAC	Did not qualify	Did not qualify
2011–12	Joakim Flygh	1	27	1	ECAC	1	20	1	12th ECAC	Did not qualify	Did not qualify
2010–11	Joakim Flygh	9	17	3	ECAC	8	12	2	10th ECAC	Did not qualify	Did not qualify
2009–10	Hilary Witt	10	16	3	ECAC	8	13	1	10th ECAC	Did not qualify	Did not qualify
2008–09	Hilary Witt	12	16	1	ECAC	8	13	1	9th ECAC	Did not qualify	Did not qualify
2007–08	Hilary Witt	11	14	6	ECAC	8	10	4	7th ECAC	Lost Quarterfinals vs. St. Lawrence (1–2 OT, 2–3 OT)	Did not qualify
2006–07	Hilary Witt	15	14	2	ECAC	10	10	2	7th ECAC	Lost Quarterfinals vs. Harvard (1–3, 1–2)	Did not qualify
2005–06	Hilary Witt	11	15	5	ECAC	8	8	4	8th ECAC	Lost Quarterfinals vs. St. Lawrence (3–6, 2–6)	Did not qualify
2004–05	Hilary Witt	16	15	1	ECAC	12	7	1	4th ECAC	Won Quarterfinals vs. Princeton (4–3 OT, 4–2); Lost Semifinals vs. Harvard (1–2)	Did not qualify
2003–04	Hilary Witt	12	16	3	ECAC	8	10	0	6th ECAC	Lost Quarterfinals vs. Dartmouth (0–4, 3–4)	Did not qualify
2002–03	Hilary Witt	9	20	2	ECAC	5	11	0	6th ECAC	Lost Quarterfinals vs. Princeton (2–6, 0–8)	Did not qualify
2001–02	John Marchetti	9	19	3	ECAC	3	12	1	7th ECAC	Lost Quarterfinals vs. Brown (0–5, 0–7)	Did not qualify
2000–01	John Marchetti	3	23	2	ECAC	2	21	1	12th ECAC	Did not qualify	Did not qualify
1999–2000	John Marchetti	6	22	1	ECAC	2	21	1	12th ECAC	Did not qualify	Did not qualify
1998–99	John Marchetti	5	21	3	ECAC	2	21	3	13th ECAC	Did not qualify	Did not qualify
1997–98	John Marchetti	7	19	2							
1996–97	Joe Snecinski	4	23	0							
1995–96	Joe Snecinski	2	20	3							
1994–95	Joe Snecinski	3	21	0							
1993–94	Joe Snecinski	4	16	1							
1992–93	Joe Snecinski	4	14	1							
1991–92	Barry Curseaden	6	13	1							
1990–91	Barry Curseaden	5	13	0							
1989–90	Barry Curseaden	4	12	1							
1988–89	Vic Russo	5	11	1							
1987–88	Vic Russo	7	11	0							
1986–87	Dave Beecher	5	14	0							
1985–86	Kathy Lenahan	12	8	0							
1984–85	Kathy Lenahan	10	9	1							
1983–84	Peter Downey	8	9	1							
1982–83	Peter Downey	3	15	1							
1981–82	Tyler Benson	4	10	0							
1980–81	Tyler Benson	6	7	0							
1979–80	Tyler Benson	8	5	0							
1978–79	Tyler Benson	8	6	1							
1977–78	Tyler Benson	7	5	1							

== Current roster ==
As of September 21, 2022.

No.	Nat.	Player	Class	Pos	Height	DoB	Hometown	Previous team
2		Emmery Korfmacher	Sophomore	D	5' 4" (1.63 m)	2002-02-19	Cottage Grove, Wisconsin	Chicago Mission
3		Olivia Muhn	Sophomore	D	5' 8" (1.73 m)	2003-06-25	Burlington, Ontario	Burlington Jr. Barracudas
4		Elle Hartje	Junior	F	5' 5" (1.65 m)	2001-04-13	Detroit, Michigan	ŠKP Bratislava
5		Tijana Miskovic	Sophomore	D	6' 1" (1.85 m)	2003-10-19	Ancaster, Ontario	Burlington Jr. Barracudas
6		Emma Seitz	Senior	D	5' 6" (1.68 m)	2000-01-18	New York, New York	Connecticut Polar Bears
7		Gracie Gilkyson	Freshman	D	5' 7" (1.7 m)	2003-03-04	Calgary, Alberta	Stanstead College
8		Tabea Botthof	Senior	D	5' 9" (1.75 m)	2000-06-01	Erding, Germany	ESC Planegg-Würmtal
9		Kiersten Goode	Junior	F	5' 6" (1.68 m)	2000-03-07	La Habra, California	Kent School
11		Sylvia Bojarski	Freshman	D	5' 6" (1.68 m)	2004-06-03	Appleton, Wisconsin	North American Hockey Academy
12		Avery Chesek	Freshman	F	5' 9" (1.75 m)	2004-02-12	Apple Valley, Minnesota	Eastview High School
13		Grace Lee	Junior	F	5' 4" (1.63 m)	2000-01-13	Boulder, Colorado	Shattuck-Saint Mary's
14		Charlotte Welch	Senior	F	5' 5" (1.65 m)	1999-07-03	Winchester, Massachusetts	Phillips Academy
15		Sofie Zander	Senior	D	5' 8" (1.73 m)	1999-06-24	Bara, Sweden	Malmö Redhawks
16		Ellie Reiter	Sophomore	F	5' 5" (1.65 m)	2002-05-21	Denver, Colorado	Bishop Kearney Selects
18		Rebecca Vanstone	Senior	F	5' 5" (1.65 m)	2000-07-12	Mississauga, Ontario	Mississauga Jr. Chiefs
19		Kaitlyn Rippon	Senior	F	5' 6" (1.68 m)	2000-02-20	Pittsford, New York	Bishop Kearney Selects
20		Jordan Ray	Freshman	F	5' 7" (1.7 m)	2004-07-22	Viera, Florida	Florida Alliance
21		Vita Poniatovskaia	Sophomore	D	5' 8" (1.73 m)	2003-01-18	Chelyabinsk, Russia	Hockey Training Institute
22		Anna Bargman	Sophomore	F	5' 8" (1.73 m)	2002-08-07	Boxford, Massachusetts	Phillips Academy
23		Kate Shaughnessy	Sophomore	F	5' 7" (1.7 m)	2000-12-12	Westwood, Massachusetts	Kent School
24		Claire Dalton (C)	Senior	F	5' 9" (1.75 m)	2000-03-20	Toronto, Ontario	Toronto Jr. Aeros
25		Carina DiAntonio	Freshman	F	5' 3" (1.6 m)	2004-01-19	Mississauga, Ontario	Brampton Jr. Canadettes
26		Addie Burton	Sophomore	F	5' 10" (1.78 m)	2001-11-30	Orono, Minnesota	University of Minnesota
27		Anja Trummer	Sophomore	F	5' 8" (1.73 m)	2001-07-24	Stockerau, Austria	EHV Sabres Vienna
28		Emma DeCorby	Sophomore	D	5' 9" (1.75 m)	2003-12-17	Saskatoon, Saskatchewan	Stanstead College
29		Emma Harvey	Sophomore	F	5' 10" (1.78 m)	2003-01-01	London, Ontario	London Jr. Devilettes
30		Pia Dukarič	Sophomore	G	5' 8" (1.73 m)	2000-08-04	Ljubljana, Slovenia	HKMK Bled
31		Mia Wendell	Sophomore	G	5' 8" (1.73 m)	2002-01-15	Buffalo, New York	Buffalo Regals
34		Ciara Coleman	Freshman	D	6' 2" (1.88 m)	2003-01-01	Holt, Michigan	HoneyBaked
35		Courtney DeNaut	Senior	G	5' 9" (1.75 m)	1999-11-12	Greenwich, Connecticut	Lawrenceville School
44		Naomi Boucher	Freshman	F	5' 6" (1.68 m)	2003-01-01	Rimouski, Quebec	John Abbott College
55		Claire Sedgewick	Freshman	F	5' 10" (1.78 m)	2003-01-01	Kingston, Ontario	John Abbott College

== Team Scoring Champions ==
Season	Player	GP	G	A	Pts
2001–02	Deanna McDevitt		19	16	35
2002–03	Natalie Babony		12	17	29
2003–04	Kristin Savard		14	8	22
2004–05	Jenna Spring		13	15	28
2005–06	Crysti Howser		12	14	26
2006–07	Crysti Howser		22	15	37
2007–08	Crysti Howser		10	19	29
2008–09	Crysti Howser		12	11	23
2009–10	Bray Ketchum		12	11	23
2010–11	Jackie Raines		9	10	19
2011–12	Aleca Hughes		4	11	15
2012–13	Kate Martini		6	10	16
2013–14	Phoebe Staenz		11	15	26
2014–15	Jamie Haddad		11	14	25
2015–16	Mallory Souliotis		4	21	25
2016–17	Eden Murray		9	18	27
2017–18	Greta Skarzynski		14	12	26
2018–19	Rebecca Vanstone		13	8	21
2019–20	Claire Dalton		12	24	36

== International ==
- Hilary Witt was a member of the U.S. Women's National Team in 2001
- Hilary Witt also earned a pair of silver medals as an assistant coach for the U.S. at the 2006 Four Nations Cup and the 2007 IIHF World Championships.
- Helen Resor played at the 2006 Four Nations Cup and the 2005, 2007 and 2008 IIHF World Championships.
- Helen Resor, Crysti Howser and Sheila Zingler were at the 2007 USA Hockey Women's National Festival, meaning that the 2006–07 Yale team tied for the most representatives at the camp among all ECAC schools.

=== Olympians ===
- Helen Resor was selected to play for Team USA in the 2006 Olympics. Resor was the first Bulldog to achieve that status, and when she won a bronze medal she became the first Yale hockey player of either gender to earn a medal since five Bulldog men won silver with Team USA in 1932.
- Denise Soesilo was the second Yale women's hockey player to compete in the Olympics. She played for Team Germany.
- Phoebe Stanz played for Switzerland's national team, winning a bronze medal in the 2014 Winter Olympics in Sochi.

== Awards and honors ==
- Laura Anderson, 2020 New England Hockey Writers Association Joe Tomasello Award (Unsung Hero)
- Laurie Belliveau, three-time Ivy League Player of the Year
- Laurie Belliveau, Goaltender, 1996 All-ECAC Team
- Laurie Belliveau, Nellie Pratt Elliott Award
- Laurie Belliveau, Finalist for the Patty Kazmaier Award, 1998
- Lucy Burton, ECAC Hockey Mandi Schwartz Student-Athlete of the Year
- Jenna Ciotti, Hockey East Player of the Week (Week of February 8, 2011)
- Jenna Ciotti, Hockey East Rookie of the Week (Week of February 8, 2011)
- Alyssa Clarke, Honorable Mention All-Ivy League, 2007–08, Defenseman, Yale (Sophomore)
- Erika Hockinson, Yale's Thomas W. Ford '42 Community Outreach Award
- Aleca Hughes, 2012 Sarah Devens Award
- Crysti Howser, Honorable Mention All-Ivy League, 2007–08, Forward, Yale (Junior)
- Kelsey Johnson, finalist for the inaugural ECAC Student-Athlete of the Year Award (2007)
- Bray Ketchum, nominee for the 2010 Patty Kazmaier Memorial Award
- Helen Resor, Defense, 2009 Third Team All-ECAC
- Helen Resor, finalist for the 2009 Patty Kazmaier Award
- Kristin Savard, Hockey Humanitarian Award (2007)
- Kristin Savard, Yale's Thomas W. Ford '42 Community Outreach Award
- Emma Seitz, 2023 Thomas W. Ford Award
- Jackee Snikeris, Honorable Mention All-Ivy League, 2007–08, Goaltender, (Freshman)
- Jackee Snikeris, nominee for the 2010 Patty Kazmaier Memorial Award
- Jackee Snikeris, MLX Skates Goaltender of the Week (Week of November 30, 2010)
- Jackee Snikeris, 2010–11 ECAC Goaltender of the Year
- Jackee Snikeris, 2010–11 ECAC Women's Student-Athlete of the Year
- Jackee Snikeris, 2011 Sarah Devens Award
- Rebecca Vanstone ECAC All Rookie Team

=== ECAC All-Academic ===
- Jaimie Leonoff, 2011–12 to 2014–15
- Mandi Schwartz, 2006–07 to 2008–09
- Jackee Snikeris, 2007–08 to 2010–11

=== All-Americans ===
- Laurie Belliveau, 1998
- Emma Seitz, 2022, 2023

=== Hockey Humanitarian award finalists ===
- Julianna Schantz-Dunn, 2000
- Deanna McDevitt 2003
- Kristin Savard 2007 (who won the award)
- Crysti Howser 2009
- Aleca Hughes, 2011 and 2012 (winner)

=== Ivy League honors ===
- Alyssa Clarke, Defense, Senior, 2010 Honorable Mention
- Bray Ketchum, Forward, Junior, 2010 Second Team All-Ivy
- Jackee Snikeris, Goaltender, Junior, 2010 First Team All-Ivy
- Mallory Souliotis, 2015–16 Second Team All-Ivy League
- Mallory Souliotis, 2017–18 First Team All-Ivy
- Greta Skarzynski, 2017–18 Second Team All-Ivy
- Gianna Meloni, 2017–18 Honorable Mention All-Ivy
- Emma Seitz, 2018–19 Second Team All-Ivy League
- Rebecca Vanstone, Forward, First year, 2020 Second Team All-Ivy
- Emma Seitz, Defense, First Year, 2020 Second Team All-Ivy
- Claire Dalton, 2019–20 Honorable Mention All-Ivy
- Anna Bargman, 2024–25 First Team All-Ivy

=== Mandi Schwartz Scholar Athlete of the Year Award ===
Awarded by the ECAC Conference

- 2022–23: Emma Seitz

=== New England hockey writers All-Star Team ===
- 2003–04 G Sarah Love
- 2004–05 D Erin Duggan
- 2006–07 D Helen Resor
- 2010–11 G Jackee Snikeris
- 2022–23 D Emma Seitz

=== USCHO honors ===
- Erin Duggan, 2004–05 All USCHO.com First Team
- Helen Resor, 2004–05 All USCHO.com Rookie Team

== Bulldogs in professional hockey ==
= CWHL All-Star	= NWHL All-Star	= Clarkson Cup Champion	= Isobel Cup Champion

Player	Position	Team(s)	League(s)	Years	Championships
Claire Dalton	Forward	Montreal Victoire Toronto Sceptres	PWHL	3	
Erin Duggan	Forward	Calgary Inferno	CWHL	2	
Elle Hartje	Forward	New York Sirens	PWHL	2	
Bray Ketchum	Forward	Boston Blades; Metropolitan Riveters also GM of Connecticut Whale	CWHL; NWHL	6	2015 Clarkson Cup; 2018 Isobel Cup
Jaimie Leonoff	Goaltender	Connecticut Whale	PHF		
Eden Murray	Defense	Calgary Inferno	CWHL		2019 Clarkson Cup
Mallory Souliotis	Defense	Boston Pride; Connecticut Whale	PHF		2021 Isobel Cup
Saroya Tinker	Forward	Metropolitan Riveters; Toronto Six	PHF		2023 Isobel Cup

== See also ==
- List of college women's ice hockey coaches with 250 wins
- Yale Bulldogs men's ice hockey
