= Cherie Piper =

Canadian ice hockey player

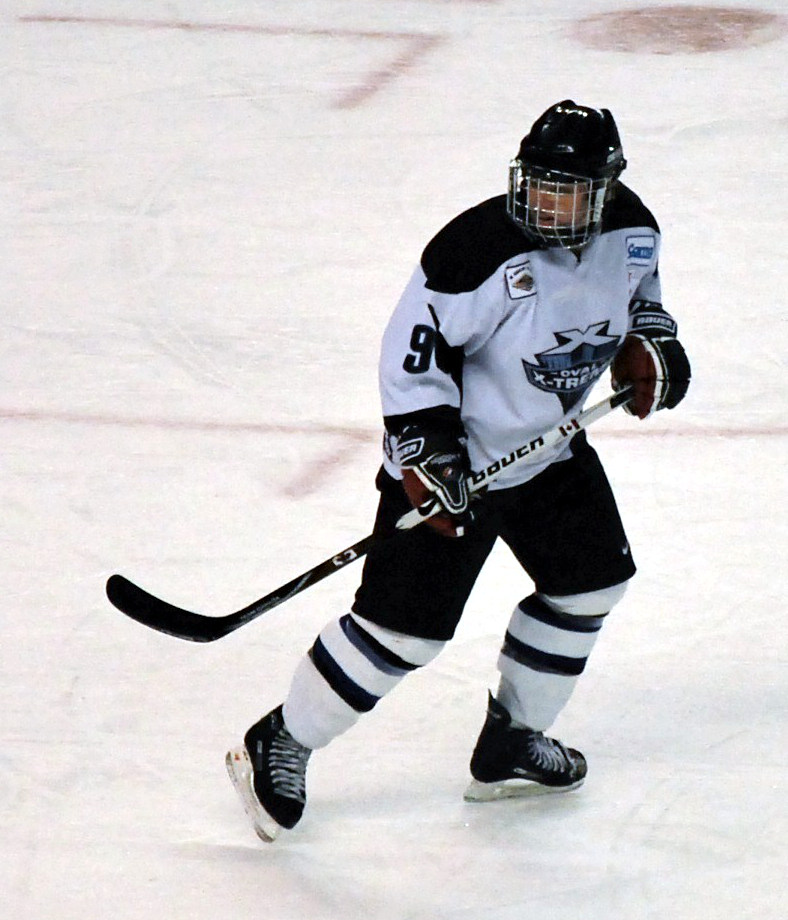
- Born: June 29, 1981 (age 45) Toronto, Ontario, Canada
- Height: 5 ft 6 in (168 cm)
- Weight: 168 lb (76 kg; 12 st 0 lb)
- Position: Forward
- Shot: Right
- CWHL team Former teams: Brampton Thunder; Mississauga Chiefs; Dartmouth Big Green
- National team: Canada
- Playing career: 2001–2013
Medal record
Representing Canada
Women's ice hockey
Olympic Games
Gold medal – first place	2002 Salt Lake City	Tournament
Gold medal – first place	2006 Turin	Tournament
Gold medal – first place	2010 Vancouver	Tournament
IIHF World Women's Championships
Gold medal – first place	2004 Canada	Tournament
Silver medal – second place	2005 Sweden	Tournament
Silver medal – second place	2008 China	Tournament
Silver medal – second place	2011 Switzerland	Tournament
Women's 4 Nations Cup
Gold medal – first place	2010 Canada	Tournament
Women's inline hockey
FIRS World Championship
Gold medal – first place	2002 United States

Cherie Piper (born June 29, 1981) is a Canadian former ice hockey player residing in Markham, Ontario. She was a member of the Canadian national women's hockey team and played for the Brampton Thunder of the Canadian Women's Hockey League (CWHL). Piper has won three Olympic gold medals with the Canadian national team in 2002, 2006 and 2010, as well as one world championship title in 2004.

== Playing career ==
In 1999, she competed for Ontario in the Canada Winter Games. During the 2000–01 NWHL season, Cherie Piper played with the Beatrice Aeros and finished seventh in league scoring with 37 points.

She played four seasons at Dartmouth College between 2002 and 2007, scoring 60 goals and 165 assists in 99 games for the Big Green. She missed the end of the 2003–04 season to play with the Canadian national team at the 2004 Women's World Ice Hockey Championships where she won a gold medal. Piper was named a finalist for the Patty Kazmaier Award in 2005. She led Dartmouth in scoring that season with 60 points.

At Hockey Canada's 2008 National Championships, she was the double overtime hero as the Mississauga Chiefs won 3-2 over the Brampton Thunder. She also scored the 2-2 equalizer in the third period.

== International play ==
She competed for Canada's Under 22 team from 1999 to 2001.

Piper was a member of the Under-22 team in 2002 when she was named to the Olympic team for 2002 Salt Lake City Games ahead of veteran Nancy Drolet as part of a move to shake up a Canadian team that had lost eight consecutive games to the United States. It was a decision that shocked other members of the team. She recorded a goal and an assist in her first game of the Olympics, and finished the tournament with five points in five games in helping Canada win the gold medal.

She won a second Olympic gold medal in 2006 and her 15 points was second to Hayley Wickenheiser (17).

A knee injury in her senior year at Dartmouth forced her off of the national team for over a year and caused her to miss the 2007 World Championships. She rejoined the team in time for the 2008 tournament where she won her second silver medal. She was cut from the 2009 team, but gained a spot on the 2010 Olympic team, winning a third consecutive gold medal.

=== Other ===
Piper was also a member of the Canada women's national inline hockey team, winning a gold medal at the 2002 FIRS Inline Hockey World Championships.

== Personal ==
Piper was born June 29, 1981, in Toronto, Ontario, the third child of Alan and Christine Piper. She has two older brothers, Michael and Stephen, and followed her brothers in taking up the sport. She played her minor hockey in the Scarborough Hockey Association with the Scarborough Sabres before moving to the Metropolitan Toronto Hockey League with the Scarborough Young Bruins. She was educated in the Toronto suburb of Scarborough. Her middle school was Henry Kelsey Senior Public School and her elementary school was Alexmuir Junior Public School. Piper graduated from Albert Campbell Collegiate Institute and majored in sociology at Dartmouth.

On June 7, 2018, Cherie married long-time beau, Joe Butkevich, in a ceremony at Memorial Gardens in Butkevich's hometown of North Bay, Ontario.

== Career statistics ==
=== International ===
Year	Team	Comp	GP	G	A	Pts	PIM
2002	Canada	Oly	5	3	2	5	0
2004	Canada	WC	5	1	6	7	4
2005	Canada	WC	5	3	1	4	2
2006	Canada	Oly	5	7	8	15	0
2008	Canada	WC	5	2	6	8	0
2010	Canada	Oly	5	5	5	10	0
2011	Canada	WC	5	3	1	4	2
	Totals		35	24	29	53	8

=== Dartmouth ===
Year	Games Played	Goals	Assists	Points	PIM
2002-03	26	17	15	32	59
2003-04	22	10	26	36	46
2004-05	28	23	37	60	50
2006-07	23	10	27	37	14

== Awards and honours ==
- 2004-05 All USCHO.com Second Team
- Patty Kazmaier Award Finalist, 2005
