= List of United States women's national ice hockey team rosters =

The following is a list of the women's national ice hockey players for the United States in various international competitions.

== Winter Olympics ==
=== 2026 Winter Olympics ===
The roster was announced on January 2, 2026.

Head coach: John Wroblewski

No.	Pos.	Name	Height	Weight	Birthdate	Team
2	D	Lee Stecklein	1.83 m (6 ft 0 in)	77 kg (170 lb)	23 April 1994 (aged 31)	(United States) Minnesota Frost
3	D	Cayla Barnes	1.57 m (5 ft 2 in)	63 kg (139 lb)	7 January 1999 (aged 27)	(United States) Seattle Torrent
4	D	Caroline Harvey	1.73 m (5 ft 8 in)	73 kg (161 lb)	14 October 2002 (aged 23)	(United States) Wisconsin Badgers
5	D	Megan Keller – A	1.80 m (5 ft 11 in)	75 kg (165 lb)	1 May 1996 (aged 29)	(United States) Boston Fleet
6	D	Rory Guilday	1.80 m (5 ft 11 in)	74 kg (163 lb)	7 September 2002 (aged 23)	(Canada) Ottawa Charge
8	D	Haley Winn	1.68 m (5 ft 6 in)	68 kg (150 lb)	14 July 2003 (aged 22)	(United States) Boston Fleet
9	F	Kirsten Simms	1.65 m (5 ft 5 in)	61 kg (134 lb)	31 August 2004 (aged 21)	(United States) Wisconsin Badgers
10	D	Laila Edwards	1.85 m (6 ft 1 in)	83 kg (183 lb)	25 January 2004 (aged 22)	(United States) Wisconsin Badgers
12	F	Kelly Pannek	1.70 m (5 ft 7 in)	75 kg (165 lb)	29 December 1995 (aged 30)	(United States) Minnesota Frost
13	F	Grace Zumwinkle	1.75 m (5 ft 9 in)	75 kg (165 lb)	23 April 1999 (aged 26)	(United States) Minnesota Frost
16	F	Hayley Scamurra	1.73 m (5 ft 8 in)	73 kg (161 lb)	14 December 1994 (aged 31)	(Canada) Montreal Victoire
17	F	Britta Curl-Salemme	1.75 m (5 ft 9 in)	72 kg (159 lb)	20 March 2000 (aged 25)	(United States) Minnesota Frost
21	F	Hilary Knight – C	1.80 m (5 ft 11 in)	78 kg (172 lb)	12 July 1989 (aged 36)	(United States) Seattle Torrent
22	F	Tessa Janecke	1.73 m (5 ft 8 in)	76 kg (168 lb)	12 May 2004 (aged 21)	(United States) Penn State Nittany Lions
23	F	Hannah Bilka	1.65 m (5 ft 5 in)	59 kg (130 lb)	24 March 2001 (aged 24)	(United States) Seattle Torrent
24	F	Joy Dunne	1.80 m (5 ft 11 in)	79 kg (174 lb)	13 June 2005 (aged 20)	(United States) Ohio State Buckeyes
25	F	Alex Carpenter – A	1.70 m (5 ft 7 in)	70 kg (150 lb)	13 April 1994 (aged 31)	(United States) Seattle Torrent
26	F	Kendall Coyne Schofield	1.57 m (5 ft 2 in)	57 kg (126 lb)	25 May 1992 (aged 33)	(United States) Minnesota Frost
27	F	Taylor Heise	1.78 m (5 ft 10 in)	74 kg (163 lb)	17 March 2000 (aged 25)	(United States) Minnesota Frost
30	G	Ava McNaughton	1.83 m (6 ft 0 in)	83 kg (183 lb)	27 October 2004 (aged 21)	(United States) Wisconsin Badgers
31	G	Aerin Frankel	1.65 m (5 ft 5 in)	63 kg (139 lb)	24 May 1999 (aged 26)	(United States) Boston Fleet
33	G	Gwyneth Philips	1.65 m (5 ft 5 in)	63 kg (139 lb)	17 September 2000 (aged 25)	(Canada) Ottawa Charge
37	F	Abbey Murphy	1.65 m (5 ft 5 in)	66 kg (146 lb)	14 April 2002 (aged 23)	(United States) Minnesota Golden Gophers

=== 2022 Winter Olympics ===
The roster was announced on 2 January 2022.

Head coach: Joel Johnson

No.	Pos.	Name	Height	Weight	Birthdate	Birthplace	Team
2	D	Lee Stecklein	1.83 m (6 ft 0 in)	77 kg (170 lb)	23 April 1994 (aged 27)	Roseville, Minnesota	(United States) PWHPA Minnesota
3	D	Cayla Barnes	1.57 m (5 ft 2 in)	63 kg (139 lb)	7 January 1999 (aged 23)	Corona, California	(United States) Boston College Eagles
4	D	Caroline Harvey	1.70 m (5 ft 7 in)	73 kg (161 lb)	14 October 2002 (aged 19)	Pelham, New Hampshire	(United States) North American Hockey Academy
5	D	Megan Keller	1.80 m (5 ft 11 in)	75 kg (165 lb)	1 May 1996 (aged 25)	Farmington Hills, Michigan	(United States) PWHPA New Hampshire
9	D	Megan Bozek	1.73 m (5 ft 8 in)	80 kg (180 lb)	27 March 1991 (aged 30)	Buffalo Grove, Illinois	(China) KRS Vanke Rays
11	F	Abby Roque	1.70 m (5 ft 7 in)	82 kg (181 lb)	25 September 1997 (aged 24)	Sault Ste. Marie, Michigan	(United States) PWHPA Minnesota
12	F	Kelly Pannek	1.73 m (5 ft 8 in)	75 kg (165 lb)	29 December 1995 (aged 26)	Plymouth, Minnesota	(United States) PWHPA Minnesota
13	F	Grace Zumwinkle	1.75 m (5 ft 9 in)	75 kg (165 lb)	23 April 1999 (aged 22)	Excelsior, Minnesota	(United States) Minnesota Golden Gophers
14	F	Brianna Decker *	1.63 m (5 ft 4 in)	67 kg (148 lb)	13 May 1991 (aged 30)	Dousman, Wisconsin	(United States) PWHPA New Hampshire
15	D	Savannah Harmon	1.60 m (5 ft 3 in)	67 kg (148 lb)	27 October 1995 (aged 26)	Downers Grove, Illinois	(United States) PWHPA Minnesota
16	F	Hayley Scamurra	1.73 m (5 ft 8 in)	73 kg (161 lb)	14 December 1994 (aged 27)	Buffalo, New York	(United States) PWHPA New Hampshire
18	F	Jesse Compher	1.73 m (5 ft 8 in)	68 kg (150 lb)	1 July 1999 (aged 22)	Northbrook, Illinois	(United States) Boston University Terriers
19	D	Jincy Roese	1.68 m (5 ft 6 in)	70 kg (150 lb)	15 May 1997 (aged 24)	O'Fallon, Missouri	(United States) PWHPA New Hampshire
20	F	Hannah Brandt	1.68 m (5 ft 6 in)	68 kg (150 lb)	27 November 1993 (aged 28)	Vadnais Heights, Minnesota	(United States) PWHPA Minnesota
21	F	Hilary Knight	1.80 m (5 ft 11 in)	78 kg (172 lb)	12 July 1989 (aged 32)	Sun Valley, Idaho	(United States) PWHPA Minnesota
24	F	Dani Cameranesi	1.65 m (5 ft 5 in)	70 kg (150 lb)	30 June 1995 (aged 26)	Plymouth, Minnesota	(United States) PWHPA Minnesota
25	F	Alex Carpenter	1.70 m (5 ft 7 in)	70 kg (150 lb)	13 April 1994 (aged 27)	North Reading, Massachusetts	(China) KRS Vanke Rays
26	F	Kendall Coyne Schofield – C	1.57 m (5 ft 2 in)	57 kg (126 lb)	25 May 1992 (aged 29)	Palos Heights, Illinois	(United States) PWHPA Minnesota
28	F	Amanda Kessel	1.68 m (5 ft 6 in)	59 kg (130 lb)	28 August 1991 (aged 30)	Madison, Wisconsin	(United States) PWHPA New Hampshire
29	G	Nicole Hensley	1.68 m (5 ft 6 in)	70 kg (150 lb)	23 June 1994 (aged 27)	Lakewood, Colorado	(United States) PWHPA New Hampshire
33	G	Alex Cavallini	1.70 m (5 ft 7 in)	70 kg (150 lb)	3 January 1992 (aged 30)	Delafield, Wisconsin	(United States) PWHPA Minnesota
35	G	Maddie Rooney	1.65 m (5 ft 5 in)	66 kg (146 lb)	7 July 1997 (aged 24)	Andover, Minnesota	(United States) PWHPA Minnesota
37	F	Abbey Murphy	1.65 m (5 ft 5 in)	66 kg (146 lb)	14 April 2002 (aged 19)	Evergreen Park, Illinois	(United States) Minnesota Golden Gophers

* Missed the remainder of the tournament after a knee injury in the first preliminary round game on February 3.

=== 2018 Winter Olympics ===
The following is the United States roster for the women's ice hockey tournament at the 2018 Winter Olympics.

Head coach: (United States) Robb Stauber Assistant coaches: (United States) Brett Strot, (United States) Paul Mara Video Coach: (United States) Nick Laurila

No.	Pos.	Name	Height	Weight	Birthdate	Birthplace	2017–18 team
2	D	Lee Stecklein	6 ft 0 in (1.83 m)	174 lb (79 kg)	23 April 1994 (aged 23)	Roseville, Minnesota	(United States) Univ. of Minnesota
3	D	Cayla Barnes	5 ft 1 in (1.55 m)	146 lb (66 kg)	7 January 1999 (aged 19)	Corona, California	(United States) Boston College
5	D	Megan Keller	5 ft 11 in (1.80 m)	161 lb (73 kg)	1 May 1996 (aged 21)	Farmington Hills, Michigan	(United States) Boston College
6	D	Kali Flanagan	5 ft 4 in (1.63 m)	141 lb (64 kg)	19 September 1995 (aged 22)	Hudson, New Hampshire	(United States) Boston College
7	F	Monique Lamoureux-Morando	5 ft 6 in (1.68 m)	148 lb (67 kg)	3 July 1989 (aged 28)	Grand Forks, North Dakota	(United States) Minnesota Whitecaps
8	D	Emily Pfalzer	5 ft 3 in (1.60 m)	126 lb (57 kg)	14 June 1993 (aged 24)	Buffalo, New York	(United States) Buffalo Beauts
10	F	Meghan Duggan – C	5 ft 10 in (1.78 m)	163 lb (74 kg)	3 September 1987 (aged 30)	Danvers, Massachusetts	(United States) Boston Pride
11	F	Haley Skarupa	5 ft 6 in (1.68 m)	141 lb (64 kg)	3 January 1994 (aged 24)	Rockville, Maryland	(United States) Boston Pride
12	F	Kelly Pannek	5 ft 8 in (1.73 m)	165 lb (75 kg)	29 December 1995 (aged 22)	Plymouth, Minnesota	(United States) Univ. of Minnesota
14	F	Brianna Decker – A	5 ft 4 in (1.63 m)	150 lb (68 kg)	13 May 1991 (aged 26)	Dousman, Wisconsin	(United States) Boston Pride
17	F	Jocelyne Lamoureux-Davidson	5 ft 6 in (1.68 m)	150 lb (68 kg)	3 July 1989 (aged 28)	Grand Forks, North Dakota	(United States) Minnesota Whitecaps
19	F	Gigi Marvin	5 ft 8 in (1.73 m)	159 lb (72 kg)	7 March 1987 (aged 30)	Warroad, Minnesota	(United States) Boston Pride
20	F	Hannah Brandt	5 ft 6 in (1.68 m)	150 lb (68 kg)	27 November 1993 (aged 24)	Vadnais Heights, Minnesota	(United States) Minnesota Whitecaps
21	F	Hilary Knight	5 ft 11 in (1.80 m)	174 lb (79 kg)	12 July 1989 (aged 28)	Sun Valley, Idaho	(United States) Boston Pride
22	D	Kacey Bellamy – A	5 ft 7 in (1.70 m)	146 lb (66 kg)	22 April 1987 (aged 30)	Westfield, Massachusetts	(United States) Boston Pride
23	D	Sidney Morin	5 ft 5 in (1.65 m)	128 lb (58 kg)	6 June 1995 (aged 22)	Minnetonka, Minnesota	(Sweden) Modo Hockey
24	F	Dani Cameranesi	5 ft 5 in (1.65 m)	148 lb (67 kg)	30 June 1995 (aged 22)	Plymouth, Minnesota	(United States) Univ. of Minnesota
26	F	Kendall Coyne	5 ft 2 in (1.57 m)	123 lb (56 kg)	25 May 1992 (aged 25)	Palos Heights, Illinois	(United States) Minnesota Whitecaps
28	F	Amanda Kessel	5 ft 5 in (1.65 m)	137 lb (62 kg)	28 August 1991 (aged 26)	Madison, Wisconsin	(United States) Metropolitan Riveters
29	G	Nicole Hensley	5 ft 7 in (1.70 m)	154 lb (70 kg)	23 June 1994 (aged 23)	Lakewood, Colorado	(United States) Lindenwood Univ.
33	G	Alex Rigsby	5 ft 7 in (1.70 m)	150 lb (68 kg)	3 January 1992 (aged 26)	Delafield, Wisconsin	(United States) Minnesota Whitecaps
35	G	Maddie Rooney	5 ft 5 in (1.65 m)	146 lb (66 kg)	1 July 1997 (aged 20)	Andover, Minnesota	(United States) Univ. of Minnesota Duluth
37	F	Amanda Pelkey	5 ft 3 in (1.60 m)	134 lb (61 kg)	29 May 1993 (aged 24)	Montpelier, Vermont	(United States) Boston Pride

=== 2014 Winter Olympics ===
The following is the United States roster in the women's ice hockey tournament of the 2014 Winter Olympics.

Head coach: (United States) Katey Stone Assistant coaches: (United States) Hilary Witt, (United States) Bobby Jay

No.	Pos.	Name	Height	Weight	Birthdate	Birthplace	2013–14 team
2	D	Lee Stecklein	183 cm (6 ft 0 in)	77 kg (170 lb)	23 April 1994 (aged 19)	Roseville, Minnesota	(United States) Minnesota Golden Gophers (NCAA)
7	F	Monique Lamoureux-Kolls	168 cm (5 ft 6 in)	70 kg (150 lb)	3 July 1989 (aged 24)	Grand Forks, North Dakota	(United States) University of North Dakota (NCAA)
9	D	Megan Bozek	173 cm (5 ft 8 in)	80 kg (180 lb)	27 March 1991 (aged 22)	Buffalo Grove, Illinois	(United States) Minnesota Golden Gophers (NCAA)
10	F	Meghan Duggan – C	178 cm (5 ft 10 in)	75 kg (165 lb)	3 September 1987 (aged 26)	Danvers, Massachusetts	(United States) Boston Blades (CWHL)
13	F	Julie Chu	173 cm (5 ft 8 in)	67 kg (148 lb)	13 March 1982 (aged 31)	Fairfield, Connecticut	(Canada) Montreal Stars (CWHL)
14	F	Brianna Decker	160 cm (5 ft 3 in)	68 kg (150 lb)	13 May 1991 (aged 22)	Dousman, Wisconsin	(United States) Wisconsin Badgers (NCAA)
15	D	Anne Schleper	178 cm (5 ft 10 in)	77 kg (170 lb)	30 January 1990 (aged 24)	St. Cloud, Minnesota	(United States) Boston Blades (CWHL)
16	F	Kelli Stack	163 cm (5 ft 4 in)	61 kg (134 lb)	13 January 1988 (aged 26)	Brooklyn Heights, Ohio	(United States) Boston Blades (CWHL)
17	F	Jocelyne Lamoureux	165 cm (5 ft 5 in)	68 kg (150 lb)	3 July 1989 (aged 24)	Grand Forks, North Dakota	(United States) University of North Dakota (NCAA)
18	F	Lyndsey Fry	173 cm (5 ft 8 in)	75 kg (165 lb)	30 October 1992 (aged 21)	Chandler, Arizona	(United States) Harvard Crimson (NCAA)
19	D	Gigi Marvin	173 cm (5 ft 8 in)	70 kg (150 lb)	7 March 1987 (aged 26)	Warroad, Minnesota	(United States) Boston Blades (CWHL)
21	F	Hilary Knight	180 cm (5 ft 11 in)	84 kg (185 lb)	12 July 1989 (aged 24)	Sun Valley, Idaho	(United States) Boston Blades (CWHL)
22	D	Kacey Bellamy	170 cm (5 ft 7 in)	66 kg (146 lb)	22 April 1987 (aged 26)	Westfield, Massachusetts	(United States) Boston Blades (CWHL)
23	D	Michelle Picard	163 cm (5 ft 4 in)	68 kg (150 lb)	27 May 1993 (aged 20)	Taunton, Massachusetts	(United States) Harvard Crimson (NCAA)
24	D	Josephine Pucci	173 cm (5 ft 8 in)	68 kg (150 lb)	27 December 1990 (aged 23)	Pearl River, New York	(United States) Harvard Crimson (NCAA)
25	F	Alex Carpenter	168 cm (5 ft 6 in)	73 kg (161 lb)	13 April 1994 (aged 19)	North Reading, Massachusetts	(United States) Boston College Eagles (NCAA)
26	F	Kendall Coyne	157 cm (5 ft 2 in)	57 kg (126 lb)	25 May 1992 (aged 21)	Palos Heights, Illinois	(United States) Northeastern Huskies (NCAA)
28	F	Amanda Kessel	165 cm (5 ft 5 in)	61 kg (134 lb)	28 August 1991 (aged 22)	Madison, Wisconsin	(United States) Minnesota Golden Gophers (NCAA)
29	G	Brianne McLaughlin	175 cm (5 ft 9 in)	58 kg (128 lb)	20 June 1987 (aged 26)	Sheffield, Ohio	(Canada) Burlington Barracudas (CWHL)
30	G	Molly Schaus	175 cm (5 ft 9 in)	70 kg (150 lb)	29 July 1988 (aged 25)	Natick, Massachusetts	(United States) Boston Blades (CWHL)
31	G	Jessie Vetter	173 cm (5 ft 8 in)	68 kg (150 lb)	19 December 1985 (aged 28)	Cottage Grove, Wisconsin	(United States) Oregon Outlaws (GLHL)

=== 2010 Winter Olympics ===
The following is the American roster in the women's ice hockey tournament of the 2010 Winter Olympics.

Head coach: (United States) Mark Johnson Assistant coaches: (United States) Dave Flint, (United States) Jodi McKenna

No.	Pos.	Name	Height	Weight	Birthdate	Birthplace	2009–10 team
1	G	Molly Schaus	174 cm (5 ft 9 in)	67 kg (148 lb)	July 29, 1988 (aged 21)	Natick, Massachusetts	Boston College Eagles
2	F	Erika Lawler	152 cm (5 ft 0 in)	59 kg (130 lb)	5 February 1987 (aged 23)	Fitchburg, Massachusetts	Wisconsin Badgers
4	D	Angela Ruggiero – A	175 cm (5 ft 9 in)	87 kg (192 lb)	3 January 1980 (aged 30)	Los Angeles, California	Harvard Crimson
5	F	Karen Thatcher	174 cm (5 ft 9 in)	74 kg (163 lb)	29 February 1984 (aged 25)	Blaine, Washington	Providence Friars
7	F	Monique Lamoureux	168 cm (5 ft 6 in)	71 kg (157 lb)	3 July 1989 (aged 20)	Grand Forks, North Dakota	North Dakota Fighting Sioux
8	D	Caitlin Cahow	163 cm (5 ft 4 in)	71 kg (157 lb)	20 May 1985 (aged 24)	New Haven, Connecticut	Harvard Crimson
9	D	Molly Engstrom	175 cm (5 ft 9 in)	81 kg (179 lb)	1 March 1983 (aged 26)	Siren, Wisconsin	Wisconsin Badgers
10	F	Meghan Duggan	175 cm (5 ft 9 in)	74 kg (163 lb)	3 September 1987 (aged 22)	Danvers, Massachusetts	Wisconsin Badgers
11	D	Lisa Chesson	169 cm (5 ft 7 in)	69 kg (152 lb)	18 August 1986 (aged 23)	Plainfield, Illinois	Ohio State Buckeyes
12	F	Jenny Potter – A	163 cm (5 ft 4 in)	66 kg (146 lb)	12 January 1979 (aged 31)	Edina, Minnesota	Minnesota Golden Gophers
13	F	Julie Chu – A	174 cm (5 ft 9 in)	67 kg (148 lb)	13 March 1982 (aged 27)	Bridgeport, Connecticut	Harvard Crimson
16	F	Kelli Stack	165 cm (5 ft 5 in)	59 kg (130 lb)	13 January 1988 (aged 22)	Brooklyn Heights, Ohio	Boston College Eagles
17	F	Jocelyne Lamoureux	168 cm (5 ft 6 in)	70 kg (150 lb)	3 July 1989 (aged 20)	Grand Forks, North Dakota	North Dakota Fighting Sioux
19	F	Gigi Marvin	174 cm (5 ft 9 in)	75 kg (165 lb)	7 March 1987 (aged 22)	Warroad, Minnesota	Minnesota Golden Gophers
20	F	Natalie Darwitz – C	160 cm (5 ft 3 in)	62 kg (137 lb)	13 October 1983 (aged 26)	Eagan, Minnesota	Minnesota Golden Gophers
21	F	Hilary Knight	178 cm (5 ft 10 in)	78 kg (172 lb)	12 July 1989 (aged 20)	Hanover, New Hampshire	Wisconsin Badgers
22	D	Kacey Bellamy	174 cm (5 ft 9 in)	65 kg (143 lb)	22 April 1987 (aged 22)	Westfield, Massachusetts	New Hampshire Wildcats
23	D	Kerry Weiland	163 cm (5 ft 4 in)	64 kg (141 lb)	18 October 1980 (aged 29)	Palmer, Alaska	Wisconsin Badgers
27	F	Jinelle Zaugg-Siergiej	183 cm (6 ft 0 in)	82 kg (181 lb)	27 March 1986 (aged 23)	Eagle River, Wisconsin	Wisconsin Badgers
29	G	Brianne McLaughlin	174 cm (5 ft 9 in)	59 kg (130 lb)	20 June 1987 (aged 22)	Sheffield, Ohio	Robert Morris Colonials
31	G	Jessie Vetter	174 cm (5 ft 9 in)	77 kg (170 lb)	19 December 1985 (aged 24)	Cottage Grove, Wisconsin	Wisconsin Badgers

=== 2006 Winter Olympics ===
(won bronze medal)

No.	Pos.	Name	Height	Weight	Birthdate	Birthplace	2004–05 team
8	D	Caitlin Cahow	162 cm (5 ft 4 in)	70 kg (150 lb)	20 May 1985 (aged 20)	New Haven, Connecticut	Harvard Crimson women's ice hockey
13	F	Julie Chu	173 cm (5 ft 8 in)	68 kg (150 lb)	13 March 1982 (aged 23)	Fairfield, Connecticut	Harvard Crimson women's ice hockey
22	F	Natalie Darwitz	160 cm (5 ft 3 in)	64 kg (141 lb)	13 October 1983 (aged 22)	Eagan, Minnesota	Minnesota Golden Gophers women's ice hockey
31	G	Pam Dreyer	165 cm (5 ft 5 in)	70 kg (150 lb)	9 August 1981 (aged 24)	Eagle River, Alaska	Brown Bears women's ice hockey
25	F	Tricia Dunn-Luoma	173 cm (5 ft 8 in)	66 kg (146 lb)	25 April 1975 (aged 30)	Derry, New Hampshire	New Hampshire Wildcats women's ice hockey
9	D	Molly Engstrom	175 cm (5 ft 9 in)	77 kg (170 lb)	1 March 1983 (aged 22)	Siren, Wisconsin	Wisconsin Badgers women's ice hockey
30	G	Chanda Gunn	170 cm (5 ft 7 in)	63 kg (139 lb)	27 January 1980 (aged 26)	Huntington Beach, California	Northeastern Huskies women's ice hockey
11	D	Jamie Hagerman	175 cm (5 ft 9 in)	77 kg (170 lb)	7 May 1981 (aged 24)	North Andover, Massachusetts	Harvard Crimson women's ice hockey
10	F	Kim Insalaco	165 cm (5 ft 5 in)	59 kg (130 lb)	4 November 1980 (aged 25)	Rochester, New York	Brown Bears women's ice hockey
18	F	Kathleen Kauth	173 cm (5 ft 8 in)	68 kg (150 lb)	28 March 1979 (aged 26)	Saratoga Springs, New York	Brown Bears women's ice hockey
3	D	Courtney Kennedy	175 cm (5 ft 9 in)	86 kg (190 lb)	29 March 1979 (aged 26)	Woburn, Massachusetts	Minnesota Golden Gophers women's ice hockey
20	F	Katie King	175 cm (5 ft 9 in)	77 kg (170 lb)	24 May 1975 (aged 30)	Salem, New Hampshire	Brown Bears women's ice hockey
19	F	Kristin King	163 cm (5 ft 4 in)	61 kg (134 lb)	21 July 1979 (aged 26)	Piqua, Ohio	Dartmouth Big Green women's ice hockey
27	F	Sarah Parsons	173 cm (5 ft 8 in)	64 kg (141 lb)	27 July 1987 (aged 18)	Dover, Massachusetts	Noble & Greenough High School
12	F	Jenny Potter	163 cm (5 ft 4 in)	66 kg (146 lb)	12 January 1979 (aged 27)	Edina, Minnesota	Minnesota Duluth Bulldogs women's ice hockey
6	D	Helen Resor	178 cm (5 ft 10 in)	70 kg (150 lb)	18 October 1985 (aged 20)	Greenwich, Connecticut	Yale Bulldogs women's ice hockey
4	D	Angela Ruggiero – A	175 cm (5 ft 9 in)	84 kg (185 lb)	3 January 1980 (aged 26)	Harper Woods, Michigan	Harvard Crimson women's ice hockey
14	F	Kelly Stephens	168 cm (5 ft 6 in)	59 kg (130 lb)	4 June 1983 (aged 22)	Seattle, Washington	Minnesota Golden Gophers women's ice hockey
5	D	Lyndsay Wall	173 cm (5 ft 8 in)	70 kg (150 lb)	12 May 1985 (aged 20)	Churchville, New York	Minnesota Golden Gophers women's ice hockey
7	F	Krissy Wendell – C	168 cm (5 ft 6 in)	70 kg (150 lb)	12 September 1981 (aged 24)	Brooklyn Park, Minnesota	Minnesota Golden Gophers women's ice hockey

=== 2002 Winter Olympics ===
(won silver medal) The following is the United States roster for the women's ice hockey tournament at the 2002 Winter Olympics.

Head coach: (United States) Ben Smith
Assistant coach: (United States) Julie Sasner

No.	Pos.	Name	Height	Weight	Birthdate	Birthplace	2001–02 team
1	G	Sara DeCosta	5 ft 10 in (1.78 m)	145 lb (66 kg)	13 May 1977 (aged 24)	Warwick, Rhode Island	(United States) U.S. National Team
2	D	Tara Mounsey	5 ft 6 in (1.68 m)	150 lb (68 kg)	12 March 1978 (aged 23)	Concord, New Hampshire	(United States) Brown University
3	D	Courtney Kennedy	5 ft 9 in (1.75 m)	190 lb (86 kg)	29 March 1979 (aged 22)	Woburn, Massachusetts	(United States) University of Minnesota
4	D	Angela Ruggiero	5 ft 9 in (1.75 m)	190 lb (86 kg)	3 January 1980 (aged 22)	Panorama City, California	(United States) U.S. National Team
5	D	Lyndsay Wall	5 ft 8 in (1.73 m)	142 lb (64 kg)	12 May 1985 (aged 16)	Churchville, New York	(United States) Syracuse Stars
6	F	Karyn Bye – A	5 ft 8 in (1.73 m)	165 lb (75 kg)	18 May 1971 (aged 30)	River Falls, Wisconsin	(United States) U.S. National Team
7	D	Sue Merz	5 ft 5 in (1.65 m)	145 lb (66 kg)	10 April 1972 (aged 29)	Greenwich, Connecticut	(United States) U.S. National Team
8	F	Laurie Baker	5 ft 7 in (1.70 m)	135 lb (61 kg)	6 November 1976 (aged 25)	Concord, Massachusetts	(United States) U.S. National Team
9	F	Andrea Kilbourne	5 ft 6 in (1.68 m)	175 lb (79 kg)	19 April 1980 (aged 21)	Saranac Lake, New York	(United States) Princeton University
11	F	A. J. Mleczko	5 ft 11 in (1.80 m)	160 lb (73 kg)	14 June 1975 (aged 26)	Nantucket, Massachusetts	(United States) U.S. National Team
12	F	Jenny Schmidgall-Potter	5 ft 4 in (1.63 m)	145 lb (66 kg)	12 January 1979 (aged 23)	Saint Paul, Minnesota	(United States) University of Minnesota Duluth
13	F	Julie Chu	5 ft 8 in (1.73 m)	155 lb (70 kg)	13 March 1982 (aged 19)	Fairfield, Connecticut	(United States) U.S. National Team
15	F	Shelley Looney	5 ft 5 in (1.65 m)	140 lb (64 kg)	21 January 1972 (aged 30)	Trenton, Michigan	(United States) U.S. National Team
17	F	Krissy Wendell	5 ft 6 in (1.68 m)	155 lb (70 kg)	12 September 1981 (aged 20)	Brooklyn Park, Minnesota	(United States) U.S. National Team
20	F	Katie King	5 ft 9 in (1.75 m)	170 lb (77 kg)	24 May 1975 (aged 26)	Salem, New Hampshire	(United States) U.S. National Team
21	F	Cammi Granato – C	5 ft 7 in (1.70 m)	140 lb (64 kg)	25 March 1971 (aged 30)	Downers Grove, Illinois	(United States) U.S. National Team
22	F	Natalie Darwitz	5 ft 2 in (1.57 m)	130 lb (59 kg)	13 October 1983 (aged 18)	Eagan, Minnesota	(United States) Eagan High School
24	D	Chris Bailey	5 ft 6 in (1.68 m)	160 lb (73 kg)	5 February 1972 (aged 30)	Marietta, New York	(United States) U.S. National Team
25	F	Tricia Dunn	5 ft 8 in (1.73 m)	150 lb (68 kg)	25 April 1974 (aged 27)	Derry, New Hampshire	(United States) U.S. National Team
29	G	Sarah Tueting	5 ft 7 in (1.70 m)	140 lb (64 kg)	26 April 1976 (aged 25)	Winnetka, Illinois	(United States) U.S. National Team

=== 1998 Winter Olympics ===
(won inaugural gold medal) The following is the United States roster for the women's ice hockey tournament at the 1998 Winter Olympics.

Head coach: (United States) Ben Smith
Assistant coach: (United States) Tom Mutch

No.	Pos.	Name	Height	Weight	Birthdate	Birthplace	1996–97 team
1	G	Sara DeCosta	5 ft 9 in (1.75 m)	130 lb (59 kg)	13 May 1977 (aged 20)	Warwick, Rhode Island	(United States) Providence College
2	D	Tara Mounsey	5 ft 6 in (1.68 m)	150 lb (68 kg)	12 March 1978 (aged 19)	Concord, New Hampshire	(United States) Brown University
3	F	Lisa Brown-Miller	5 ft 1 in (1.55 m)	128 lb (58 kg)	16 November 1966 (aged 31)	Union Lake, Michigan	(United States) National Team
4	D	Angela Ruggiero	5 ft 9 in (1.75 m)	175 lb (79 kg)	3 January 1980 (aged 18)	Panorama City, California	(United States) Choate Rosemary Hall
5	D	Colleen Coyne	5 ft 3 in (1.60 m)	131 lb (59 kg)	19 September 1971 (aged 26)	Medford, Massachusetts	(United States) National Team
6	F	Karyn Bye – A	5 ft 8 in (1.73 m)	160 lb (73 kg)	18 May 1971 (aged 26)	River Falls, Wisconsin	(United States) National Team
7	D	Sue Merz	5 ft 5 in (1.65 m)	145 lb (66 kg)	10 April 1972 (aged 25)	Greenwich, Connecticut	(Canada) Newtonbrook Panthers
8	F	Laurie Baker	5 ft 6 in (1.68 m)	140 lb (64 kg)	6 November 1976 (aged 21)	Concord, Massachusetts	(United States) Providence College
9	F	Sandra Whyte	5 ft 7 in (1.70 m)	130 lb (59 kg)	24 August 1970 (aged 27)	Saugus, Massachusetts	(United States) National Team
11	F	A. J. Mleczko	5 ft 11 in (1.80 m)	160 lb (73 kg)	14 June 1975 (aged 22)	Nantucket, Massachusetts	(United States) National Team
12	F	Jenny Schmidgall	5 ft 3 in (1.60 m)	130 lb (59 kg)	12 January 1979 (aged 19)	Saint Paul, Minnesota	(United States) Edina High School
14	D	Vicki Movsessian	5 ft 5 in (1.65 m)	140 lb (64 kg)	6 November 1972 (aged 25)	Lexington, Massachusetts	(United States) National Team
15	F	Shelley Looney	5 ft 5 in (1.65 m)	140 lb (64 kg)	21 January 1972 (aged 26)	Brownstown Township, Michigan	(United States) National Team
18	F	Alana Blahoski	5 ft 7 in (1.70 m)	127 lb (58 kg)	29 April 1974 (aged 23)	Saint Paul, Minnesota	(United States) National Team
20	F	Katie King	5 ft 8 in (1.73 m)	165 lb (75 kg)	24 May 1975 (aged 22)	Salem, New Hampshire	(United States) Brown University
21	F	Cammi Granato – C	5 ft 7 in (1.70 m)	140 lb (64 kg)	25 March 1971 (aged 26)	Downers Grove, Illinois	(United States) Concordia University
22	F	Gretchen Ulion	5 ft 2 in (1.57 m)	130 lb (59 kg)	4 May 1972 (aged 25)	Marlborough, Connecticut	(United States) National Team
24	D	Chris Bailey	5 ft 6 in (1.68 m)	160 lb (73 kg)	5 February 1972 (aged 26)	Marietta, New York	(United States) National Team
25	F	Tricia Dunn	5 ft 8 in (1.73 m)	142 lb (64 kg)	25 April 1974 (aged 23)	Derry, New Hampshire	(United States) National Team
29	G	Sarah Tueting	5 ft 7 in (1.70 m)	140 lb (64 kg)	26 April 1976 (aged 21)	Winnetka, Illinois	(United States) National Team

== IIHF Women's World Championship ==
=== 2025 IIHF Women's World Championship ===
The following is the United States roster for the women's ice hockey tournament at the 2025 IIHF Women's World Championship. The team reclaimed the gold medal at the World Championships, edging out Canada 4–3 in overtime in the gold medal game.

Head Coach: John Wroblewski
Assistant coach: Josh Sciba, Shari Dickerman, Brent Hill

No.	Pos.	Name	Height	Weight	Birthdate	Hometown	Previous team
2	D	Lee Stecklein	6 ft 0 in (1.83 m)	—N/a	April 23, 1994 (aged 30)	Roseville, Minnesota	Minnesota Frost (PWHL)
3	D	Cayla Barnes	5 ft 2 in (1.57 m)	—N/a	January 7, 1999 (aged 26)	Eastvale, California	Montreal Victoire (PWHL)
4	D	Caroline Harvey	5 ft 8 in (1.73 m)	—N/a	October 14, 2002 (aged 22)	Salem, New Hampshire	Wisconsin Badgers (WCHA)
5	D	Megan Keller	5 ft 11 in (1.80 m)	—N/a	May 1, 1996 (aged 28)	Farmington Hills, Michigan	Boston Fleet (PWHL)
7	F	Lacey Eden	5 ft 8 in (1.73 m)	—N/a	May 2, 2002 (aged 22)	Annapolis, Maryland	Wisconsin Badgers (WCHA)
8	D	Haley Winn	5 ft 6 in (1.68 m)	—N/a	July 14, 2003 (aged 21)	Rochester, New York	Clarkson Golden Knights (ECAC)
9	F	Kirsten Simms	5 ft 5 in (1.65 m)	—N/a	August 31, 2004 (aged 20)	Plymouth, Michigan	Wisconsin Badgers (WCHA)
10	D	Laila Edwards	6 ft 1 in (1.85 m)	—N/a	January 25, 2004 (aged 21)	Cleveland Heights, Ohio	Wisconsin Badgers (WCHA)
12	F	Kelly Pannek	5 ft 7 in (1.70 m)	—N/a	December 29, 1995 (aged 29)	Plymouth, Minnesota	Minnesota Frost (PWHL)
13	F	Grace Zumwinkle	5 ft 9 in (1.75 m)	—N/a	April 23, 1999 (aged 25)	Excelsior, Minnesota	Minnesota Frost (PWHL)
15	D	Savannah Harmon	5 ft 3 in (1.60 m)	—N/a	October 27, 1995 (aged 29)	Downers Grove, Illinois	Toronto Sceptres (PWHL)
16	F	Hayley Scamurra	5 ft 8 in (1.73 m)	—N/a	December 14, 1994 (aged 30)	Buffalo, New York	Ottawa Charge (PWHL)
17	F	Britta Curl-Salemme	5 ft 9 in (1.75 m)	—N/a	March 20, 2000 (aged 25)	Bismarck, North Dakota	Minnesota Frost (PWHL)
18	F	Jesse Compher	5 ft 8 in (1.73 m)	—N/a	July 1, 1999 (aged 25)	Northbrook, Illinois	Toronto Sceptres (PWHL)
21	F	Hilary Knight	5 ft 11 in (1.80 m)	—N/a	July 12, 1989 (aged 35)	Sun Valley, Idaho	Boston Fleet (PWHL)
22	F	Tessa Janecke	5 ft 8 in (1.73 m)	—N/a	May 12, 2004 (aged 20)	Warren, Illinois	Penn State Nittany Lions (AHA)
24	F	Joy Dunne	5 ft 11 in (1.80 m)	—N/a	June 13, 2005 (aged 19)	O'Fallon, Missouri	Ohio State Buckeyes (WCHA)
25	F	Alex Carpenter	5 ft 5 in (1.65 m)	—N/a	April 13, 1994 (aged 31)	North Reading, Massachusetts	New York Sirens (PWHL)
26	F	Kendall Coyne Schofield	5 ft 2 in (1.57 m)	—N/a	May 25, 1992 (aged 32)	Palos Heights, Illinois	Minnesota Frost (PWHL)
27	F	Taylor Heise	5 ft 10 in (1.78 m)	—N/a	March 17, 2000 (aged 25)	Lake City, Minnesota	Minnesota Frost (PWHL)
30	G	Ava McNaughton	6 ft 0 in (1.83 m)	—N/a	October 27, 2004 (aged 20)	Seven Fields, Pennsylvania	Wisconsin Badgers (WCHA)
31	G	Aerin Frankel	5 ft 5 in (1.65 m)	—N/a	May 24, 1999 (aged 25)	Chappaqua, New York	Boston Fleet (PWHL)
33	G	Gwyneth Philips	5 ft 5 in (1.65 m)	—N/a	September 17, 2000 (aged 24)	Athens, Ohio	Ottawa Charge (PWHL)
37	F	Abbey Murphy	5 ft 5 in (1.65 m)	—N/a	April 14, 2002 (aged 23)	Evergreen Park, Illinois	Minnesota Golden Gophers (WCHA)
38	D	Anna Wilgren	5 ft 8 in (1.73 m)	—N/a	November 18, 1999 (aged 25)	Hudson, Wisconsin	Montreal Victoire (PWHL)

=== 2024 IIHF Women's World Championship ===
The following is the United States roster for the women's ice hockey tournament at the 2024 IIHF Women's World Championship. The team won the silver medal at the World Championships, losing to Canada 6–5 in overtime in the gold medal game.

Head Coach: John Wroblewski
Assistant coach: Josh Sciba, Shari Dickerman, Brent Hill

No.	Pos.	Name	Height	Weight	Birthdate	Hometown	Previous team
3	D	Cayla Barnes	5 ft 2 in (1.57 m)	—N/a	January 7, 1999 (aged 25)	Eastvale, California	Ohio State Buckeyes (WCHA)
4	D	Caroline Harvey	5 ft 7 in (1.70 m)	—N/a	October 14, 2002 (aged 21)	Salem, New Hampshire	Wisconsin Badgers (WCHA)
5	D	Megan Keller	5 ft 11 in (1.80 m)	—N/a	May 1, 1996 (aged 27)	Farmington Hills, Michigan	PWHL Boston (PWHL)
6	D	Rory Guilday	6 ft 0 in (1.83 m)	—N/a	September 7, 2002 (aged 21)	Minnetonka, Minnesota	Cornell Big Red (ECAC)
7	F	Lacey Eden	5 ft 8 in (1.73 m)	—N/a	May 2, 2002 (aged 21)	Annapolis, Maryland	Wisconsin Badgers (WCHA)
8	D	Haley Winn	5 ft 5 in (1.65 m)	—N/a	July 14, 2003 (aged 20)	Rochester, New York	Clarkson Golden Knights (ECAC)
9	F	Kirsten Simms	5 ft 5 in (1.65 m)	—N/a	August 31, 2004 (aged 19)	Plymouth, Michigan	Wisconsin Badgers (WCHA)
12	F	Kelly Pannek	5 ft 8 in (1.73 m)	—N/a	December 29, 1995 (aged 28)	Plymouth, Minnesota	PWHL Minnesota (PWHL)
13	F	Grace Zumwinkle	5 ft 9 in (1.75 m)	—N/a	April 23, 1999 (aged 24)	Excelsior, Minnesota	PWHL Minnesota (PWHL)
14	F	Laila Edwards	6 ft 1 in (1.85 m)	—N/a	January 25, 2004 (aged 20)	Cleveland, Ohio	Wisconsin Badgers (WCHA)
15	D	Savannah Harmon	5 ft 3 in (1.60 m)	—N/a	October 27, 1995 (aged 28)	Downers Grove, Illinois	PWHL Ottawa (PWHL)
16	F	Hayley Scamurra	5 ft 8 in (1.73 m)	—N/a	December 14, 1994 (aged 29)	Buffalo, New York	PWHL Ottawa (PWHL)
17	F	Britta Curl	5 ft 9 in (1.75 m)	—N/a	March 20, 2000 (aged 24)	Bismarck, North Dakota	Wisconsin Badgers (WCHA)
21	F	Hilary Knight	5 ft 11 in (1.80 m)	—N/a	July 12, 1989 (aged 34)	Sun Valley, Idaho	PWHL Boston (PWHL)
22	F	Tessa Janecke	5 ft 8 in (1.73 m)	—N/a	May 12, 2004 (aged 19)	Warren, Illinois	Penn State Nittany Lions (CHA)
23	F	Hannah Bilka	5 ft 5 in (1.65 m)	—N/a	March 24, 2001 (aged 23)	Coppell, Texas	Ohio State Buckeyes (WCHA)
24	F	Joy Dunne	5 ft 11 in (1.80 m)	—N/a	June 13, 2005 (aged 18)	O'Fallon, Missouri	Ohio State Buckeyes (WCHA)
25	F	Alex Carpenter	5 ft 5 in (1.65 m)	—N/a	April 13, 1994 (aged 30)	North Reading, Massachusetts	PWHL New York (PWHL)
26	F	Kendall Coyne Schofield	5 ft 2 in (1.57 m)	—N/a	May 25, 1992 (aged 31)	Palos Heights, Illinois	PWHL Minnesota (PWHL)
27	F	Taylor Heise	5 ft 10 in (1.78 m)	—N/a	March 17, 2000 (aged 24)	Lake City, Minnesota	PWHL Minnesota (PWHL)
29	G	Nicole Hensley	5 ft 6 in (1.68 m)	—N/a	June 23, 1994 (aged 29)	Lakewood, Colorado	PWHL Minnesota (PWHL)
31	G	Aerin Frankel	5 ft 5 in (1.65 m)	—N/a	May 24, 1999 (aged 24)	Chappaqua, New York	PWHL Boston (PWHL)
33	G	Gwyneth Philips	5 ft 6 in (1.68 m)	—N/a	September 17, 2000 (aged 23)	Athens, Ohio	Northeastern Huskies (HEA)
37	F	Abbey Murphy	5 ft 5 in (1.65 m)	—N/a	April 14, 2002 (aged 22)	Evergreen Park, Illinois	Minnesota Golden Gophers (WCHA)
43	D	Sydney Morrow	5 ft 7 in (1.70 m)	—N/a	April 12, 2004 (aged 20)	Darien, Connecticut	Colgate Raiders (ECAC)

=== 2023 IIHF Women's World Championship ===
The following is the United States roster for the women's ice hockey tournament at the 2023 IIHF Women's World Championship. The team won the World Championship gold medal, besting Canada 6–3 in the gold medal game.

Head Coach: John Wroblewski
Assistant coach: Josh Sciba, Shari Dickerman, Brent Hill

No.	Pos.	Name	Height	Weight	Birthdate	Hometown	Previous team
2	D	Lee Stecklein	6 ft 0 in (1.83 m)	—N/a	April 23, 1994 (aged 28)	Roseville, Minnesota	PWHPA
3	D	Cayla Barnes	5 ft 2 in (1.57 m)	—N/a	January 7, 1999 (aged 24)	Eastvale, California	Boston College Eagles (HEA)
4	D	Caroline Harvey	5 ft 7 in (1.70 m)	—N/a	October 14, 2002 (aged 20)	Salem, New Hampshire	Wisconsin Badgers (WCHA)
5	D	Megan Keller	5 ft 11 in (1.80 m)	—N/a	May 1, 1996 (aged 26)	Farmington Hills, Michigan	PWHPA
6	D	Rory Guilday	6 ft 0 in (1.83 m)	—N/a	September 7, 2002 (aged 20)	Minnetonka, Minnesota	Cornell Big Red (ECAC)
7	F	Lacey Eden	5 ft 8 in (1.73 m)	—N/a	May 2, 2002 (aged 20)	Annapolis, Maryland	Wisconsin Badgers (WCHA)
8	D	Haley Winn	5 ft 5 in (1.65 m)	—N/a	July 14, 2003 (aged 19)	Rochester, New York	Clarkson Golden Knights (ECAC)
10	F	Becca Gilmore	5 ft 6 in (1.68 m)	—N/a	February 15, 1998 (aged 25)	Wayland, Massachusetts	Boston Pride (PHF)
11	F	Abby Roque	5 ft 7 in (1.70 m)	—N/a	September 25, 1997 (aged 25)	Sault Ste. Marie, Michigan	PWHPA
12	F	Kelly Pannek	5 ft 8 in (1.73 m)	—N/a	December 29, 1995 (aged 27)	Plymouth, Minnesota	PWHPA
15	D	Savannah Harmon	5 ft 3 in (1.60 m)	—N/a	October 27, 1995 (aged 27)	Downers Grove, Illinois	PWHPA
16	F	Hayley Scamurra	5 ft 8 in (1.73 m)	—N/a	December 14, 1994 (aged 28)	Getzville, New York	PWHPA
17	F	Britta Curl	5 ft 9 in (1.75 m)	—N/a	March 20, 2000 (aged 23)	Bismarck, North Dakota	Wisconsin Badgers (WCHA)
21	F	Hilary Knight	5 ft 11 in (1.80 m)	—N/a	July 12, 1989 (aged 33)	Sun Valley, Idaho	PWHPA
22	F	Tessa Janecke	5 ft 8 in (1.73 m)	—N/a	May 12, 2004 (aged 18)	Orangeville, Illinois	Penn State Nittany Lions (CHA)
23	F	Hannah Bilka	5 ft 5 in (1.65 m)	—N/a	March 24, 2001 (aged 22)	Coppell, Texas	Boston College Eagles (HEA)
25	F	Alex Carpenter	5 ft 7 in (1.70 m)	—N/a	April 13, 1994 (aged 29)	North Reading, Massachusetts	PWHPA
27	F	Taylor Heise	5 ft 10 in (1.78 m)	—N/a	March 17, 2000 (aged 23)	Lake City, Minnesota	Minnesota Golden Gophers (WCHA)
28	F	Amanda Kessel	5 ft 6 in (1.68 m)	—N/a	August 28, 1991 (aged 31)	Madison, Wisconsin	PWHPA
29	G	Nicole Hensley	5 ft 6 in (1.68 m)	—N/a	June 23, 1994 (aged 28)	Lakewood, Colorado	PWHPA
30	G	Abbey Levy	6 ft 1 in (1.85 m)	—N/a	April 2, 2000 (aged 23)	Congers, New York	Boston College Eagles (HEA)
31	G	Aerin Frankel	5 ft 5 in (1.65 m)	—N/a	May 24, 1999 (aged 23)	Chappaqua, New York	PWHPA
32	D	Nicole LaMantia	5 ft 4 in (1.63 m)	—N/a	October 27, 1999 (aged 23)	Wayne, Illinois	Wisconsin Badgers (WCHA)
36	F	Gabbie Hughes	5 ft 9 in (1.75 m)	—N/a	October 4, 1999 (aged 23)	Lino Lakes, Minnesota	Minnesota Duluth Bulldogs (WCHA)
37	F	Abbey Murphy	5 ft 5 in (1.65 m)	—N/a	April 14, 2002 (aged 21)	Evergreen Park, Illinois	Minnesota Golden Gophers (WCHA)

=== 2022 IIHF Women's World Championship ===
The following is the United States roster for the women's ice hockey tournament at the 2022 IIHF Women's World Championship. The team won their second consecutive World Championship silver medal, losing to Canada 2–1 in the gold medal game.

Head Coach: John Wroblewski
Assistant coach: Josh Sciba, Shelley Looney

No.	Pos.	Name	Height	Weight	Birthdate	Hometown	Previous team
2	D	Lee Stecklein	6 ft 0 in (1.83 m)	170 lb (77 kg)	April 23, 1994 (aged 28)	Roseville, Minnesota	PWHPA
3	D	Cayla Barnes	5 ft 2 in (1.57 m)	138 lb (63 kg)	January 7, 1999 (aged 23)	Eastvale, California	Boston College Eagles (HEA)
4	D	Caroline Harvey	5 ft 7 in (1.70 m)	145 lb (66 kg)	October 14, 2002 (aged 19)	Salem, New Hampshire	Wisconsin Badgers (WCHA)
5	D	Megan Keller	5 ft 11 in (1.80 m)	165 lb (75 kg)	May 1, 1996 (aged 26)	Farmington Hills, Michigan	PWHPA
6	F	Lacey Eden	5 ft 8 in (1.73 m)	155 lb (70 kg)	May 2, 2002 (aged 20)	Annapolis, Maryland	Wisconsin Badgers (WCHA)
11	F	Abby Roque	5 ft 7 in (1.70 m)	180 lb (82 kg)	September 25, 1997 (aged 24)	Sault Ste. Marie, Michigan	PWHPA
12	F	Kelly Pannek	5 ft 8 in (1.73 m)	165 lb (75 kg)	December 29, 1995 (aged 26)	Plymouth, Minnesota	PWHPA
13	F	Grace Zumwinkle	5 ft 9 in (1.75 m)	165 lb (75 kg)	April 13, 1999 (aged 23)	Excelsior, Minnesota	Minnesota Golden Gophers (WCHA)
15	D	Savannah Harmon	5 ft 3 in (1.60 m)	148 lb (67 kg)	October 27, 1995 (aged 26)	Downers Grove, Illinois	PWHPA
16	F	Hayley Scamurra	5 ft 8 in (1.73 m)	161 lb (73 kg)	December 14, 1994 (aged 27)	Getzville, New York	PWHPA
18	F	Jesse Compher	5 ft 8 in (1.73 m)	150 lb (68 kg)	July 1, 1999 (aged 23)	Northbrook, Illinois	Wisconsin Badgers (WCHA)
19	D	Jincy Dunne	5 ft 6 in (1.68 m)	155 lb (70 kg)	May 15, 1997 (aged 25)	O'Fallon, Missouri	PWHPA
20	F	Hannah Brandt	5 ft 6 in (1.68 m)	150 lb (68 kg)	November 27, 1993 (aged 28)	Vadnais Heights, Minnesota	PWHPA
21	F	Hilary Knight	5 ft 11 in (1.80 m)	172 lb (78 kg)	July 12, 1989 (aged 33)	Sun Valley, Idaho	PWHPA
23	F	Hannah Bilka	5 ft 5 in (1.65 m)	145 lb (66 kg)	March 24, 2001 (aged 21)	Coppell, Texas	Boston College Eagles (HEA)
25	F	Alex Carpenter	5 ft 7 in (1.70 m)	155 lb (70 kg)	April 13, 1994 (aged 28)	North Reading, Massachusetts	KRS Vanke Rays (ZhHL)
26	F	Kendall Coyne Schofield	5 ft 2 in (1.57 m)	125 lb (57 kg)	May 25, 1992 (aged 30)	Palos Heights, Illinois	PWHPA
27	F	Taylor Heise	5 ft 10 in (1.78 m)	168 lb (76 kg)	March 17, 2000 (aged 22)	Lake City, Minnesota	Minnesota Golden Gophers (WCHA)
28	F	Amanda Kessel	5 ft 6 in (1.68 m)	130 lb (59 kg)	August 28, 1991 (aged 31)	Madison, Wisconsin	PWHPA
29	G	Nicole Hensley	5 ft 6 in (1.68 m)	155 lb (70 kg)	June 23, 1994 (aged 28)	Lakewood, Colorado	PWHPA
31	G	Aerin Frankel	5 ft 5 in (1.65 m)	150 lb (68 kg)	May 24, 1999 (aged 23)	Briarcliff Manor, New York	Northeastern Huskies (HEA)
35	G	Maddie Rooney	5 ft 5 in (1.65 m)	145 lb (66 kg)	July 7, 1997 (aged 25)	Andover, Minnesota	PWHPA
36	D	Rory Guilday	5 ft 11 in (1.80 m)	185 lb (84 kg)	September 7, 2002 (aged 19)	Minnetonka, Minnesota	Cornell Big Red (ECAC)

=== 2021 IIHF Women's World Championship ===
The following is the United States roster for the women's ice hockey tournament at the 2021 IIHF Women's World Championship. The team won a silver medal at the tournament, losing to Canada in overtime, 3–2, in the gold medal game.

Head Coach: Joel Johnson
Assistant coach: Brian Pothier, Courtney Kennedy, Allison Coomey

No.	Pos.	Name	Height	Weight	Birthdate	Hometown	Previous team
2	D	Lee Stecklein	6 ft 0 in (1.83 m)	170 lb (77 kg)	April 23, 1994 (aged 27)	Roseville, Minnesota	Team Adidas (PWHPA)
3	D	Cayla Barnes	5 ft 2 in (1.57 m)	138 lb (63 kg)	January 7, 1999 (aged 22)	Eastvale, California	Boston College Eagles (HEA)
4	D	Caroline Harvey	5 ft 7 in (1.70 m)	145 lb (66 kg)	October 14, 2002 (aged 18)	Salem, New Hampshire	Wisconsin Badgers (WCHA)
5	D	Megan Keller	5 ft 11 in (1.80 m)	165 lb (75 kg)	May 1, 1996 (aged 25)	Farmington Hills, Michigan	Team Women's Sports Foundation (PWHPA)
9	D	Megan Bozek	5 ft 8 in (1.73 m)	176 lb (80 kg)	March 27, 1999 (aged 22)	Buffalo Grove, Illinois	KRS Vanke Rays (ZhHL)
11	F	Abby Roque	5 ft 7 in (1.70 m)	180 lb (82 kg)	September 25, 1997 (aged 23)	Sault Ste. Marie, Michigan	Team Adidas (PWHPA)
12	F	Kelly Pannek	5 ft 8 in (1.73 m)	165 lb (75 kg)	December 29, 1995 (aged 25)	Plymouth, Minnesota	Team Adidas (PWHPA)
13	F	Grace Zumwinkle	5 ft 9 in (1.75 m)	165 lb (75 kg)	April 23, 1999 (aged 22)	Excelsior, Minnesota	Minnesota Golden Gophers (WCHA)
14	F	Brianna Decker	5 ft 4 in (1.63 m)	148 lb (67 kg)	May 13, 1991 (aged 30)	Dousman, Wisconsin	Team Women's Sports Foundation (PWHPA)
15	D	Savannah Harmon	5 ft 3 in (1.60 m)	148 lb (67 kg)	October 27, 1995 (aged 25)	Downers Grove, Illinois	Team Adidas (PWHPA)
16	F	Hayley Scamurra	5 ft 8 in (1.73 m)	161 lb (73 kg)	December 14, 1994 (aged 26)	Getzville, New York	Team Women's Sports Foundation (PWHPA)
18	F	Jesse Compher	5 ft 8 in (1.73 m)	150 lb (68 kg)	January 7, 1999 (aged 22)	Northbrook, Illinois	Boston University Terriers (HEA)
19	D	Jincy Dunne	5 ft 6 in (1.68 m)	155 lb (70 kg)	May 15, 1997 (aged 24)	O'Fallon, Missouri	Team Women's Sports Foundation (PWHPA)
21	F	Hilary Knight	5 ft 11 in (1.80 m)	172 lb (78 kg)	July 12, 1989 (aged 32)	Sun Valley, Idaho	Team Adidas (PWHPA)
23	D	Natalie Buchbinder	5 ft 8 in (1.73 m)	150 lb (68 kg)	January 22, 1999 (aged 22)	Fairport, New York	Wisconsin Badgers (WCHA)
24	F	Dani Cameranesi	5 ft 5 in (1.65 m)	155 lb (70 kg)	June 30, 1995 (aged 26)	Plymouth, Minnesota	Team Adidas (PWHPA)
25	F	Alex Carpenter	5 ft 7 in (1.70 m)	155 lb (70 kg)	April 13, 1994 (aged 27)	North Reading, Massachusetts	KRS Vanke Rays (ZhHL)
26	F	Kendall Coyne Schofield	5 ft 2 in (1.57 m)	125 lb (57 kg)	May 25, 1992 (aged 29)	Palos Heights, Illinois	Team Adidas (PWHPA)
27	F	Britta Curl	5 ft 9 in (1.75 m)	160 lb (73 kg)	March 20, 2000 (aged 21)	Bismarck, North Dakota	Wisconsin Badgers (WCHA)
28	F	Amanda Kessel	5 ft 6 in (1.68 m)	130 lb (59 kg)	August 28, 1991 (aged 30)	Madison, Wisconsin	Team Women's Sports Foundation (PWHPA)
29	G	Nicole Hensley	5 ft 6 in (1.68 m)	155 lb (70 kg)	June 23, 1994 (aged 27)	Lakewood, Colorado	Team Adidas (PWHPA)
31	G	Aerin Frankel	5 ft 5 in (1.65 m)	140 lb (64 kg)	May 24, 1999 (aged 22)	New York, New York	Northeastern Huskies (HEA)
33	G	Alex Cavallini	5 ft 7 in (1.70 m)	155 lb (70 kg)	January 3, 1992 (aged 29)	Delafield, Wisconsin	Team Women's Sports Foundation (PWHPA)
36	F	Lacey Eden	5 ft 8 in (1.73 m)	150 lb (68 kg)	May 2, 2002 (aged 19)	Annapolis, Maryland	Wisconsin Badgers (WCHA)
37	F	Abbey Murphy	5 ft 5 in (1.65 m)	145 lb (66 kg)	April 14, 2002 (aged 19)	Evergreen Park, Illinois	Minnesota Golden Gophers (WCHA)

=== 2020 IIHF Women's World Championship ===
The following is the United States roster for the women's ice hockey tournament at the 2020 IIHF Women's World Championship. On March 7th, the International Ice Hockey Federation announced that the 2020 Women's World Championship was cancelled due to the COVID-19 pandemic.

Head Coach: Bob Corkum
Assistant coach: Joel Johnson, Brian Pothier

No.	Pos.	Name	Height	Weight	Birthdate	Hometown	Previous team
2	D	Lee Stecklein	6 ft 0 in (1.83 m)	170 lb (77 kg)	April 23, 1994 (aged 25)	Roseville, Minnesota	Minnesota Whitecaps (NWHL)
3	D	Cayla Barnes	5 ft 2 in (1.57 m)	138 lb (63 kg)	January 7, 1999 (aged 21)	Eastvale, California	Boston College Eagles (HEA)
5	D	Megan Keller	5 ft 11 in (1.80 m)	165 lb (75 kg)	May 1, 1996 (aged 23)	Farmington Hills, Michigan	Boston College Eagles (HEA)
8	D	Emily Matheson	5 ft 2 in (1.57 m)	125 lb (57 kg)	June 14, 1993 (aged 26)	Buffalo, New York	Buffalo Beauts (NWHL)
9	D	Megan Bozek	5 ft 8 in (1.73 m)	176 lb (80 kg)	March 27, 1991 (aged 28)	Buffalo Grove, Illinois	Markham Thunder (CWHL)
11	F	Abby Roque	5 ft 7 in (1.70 m)	180 lb (82 kg)	September 25, 1997 (aged 22)	Sault Ste. Marie, Michigan	Wisconsin Badgers (WCHA)
12	F	Kelly Pannek	5 ft 8 in (1.73 m)	165 lb (75 kg)	December 29, 1995 (aged 24)	Plymouth, Minnesota	Minnesota Golden Gophers (WCHA)
14	F	Brianna Decker	5 ft 4 in (1.63 m)	148 lb (67 kg)	May 13, 1991 (aged 28)	Dousman, Wisconsin	Calgary Inferno (CWHL)
16	F	Hayley Scamurra	5 ft 8 in (1.73 m)	161 lb (73 kg)	December 14, 1994 (aged 25)	Williamsville, New York	Buffalo Beauts (NWHL)
18	F	Jesse Compher	5 ft 8 in (1.73 m)	150 lb (68 kg)	July 1, 1999 (aged 20)	Northbrook, Illinois	Boston University Terriers (HEA)
20	F	Hannah Brandt	5 ft 6 in (1.68 m)	150 lb (68 kg)	November 27, 1993 (aged 26)	Vadnais Heights, Minnesota	Minnesota Whitecaps (NWHL)
21	F	Hilary Knight	5 ft 11 in (1.80 m)	172 lb (78 kg)	July 12, 1989 (aged 30)	Sun Valley, Idaho	Les Canadiennes de Montréal (CWHL)
22	D	Kacey Bellamy	5 ft 7 in (1.70 m)	145 lb (66 kg)	April 22, 1987 (aged 32)	Westfield, Massachusetts	Calgary Inferno (CWHL)
23	F	Britta Curl	5 ft 9 in (1.75 m)	160 lb (73 kg)	March 20, 2000 (aged 19)	Bismarck, North Dakota	Wisconsin Badgers (WCHA)
24	F	Dani Cameranesi	5 ft 5 in (1.65 m)	155 lb (70 kg)	June 30, 1995 (aged 24)	Plymouth, Minnesota	Buffalo Beauts (NWHL)
25	F	Alex Carpenter	5 ft 7 in (1.70 m)	155 lb (70 kg)	April 13, 1994 (aged 25)	North Reading, Massachusetts	Kunlun Red Star (CWHL)
26	F	Kendall Coyne Schofield	5 ft 2 in (1.57 m)	125 lb (57 kg)	May 25, 1992 (aged 27)	Palos Heights, Illinois	Minnesota Whitecaps (NWHL)
28	F	Amanda Kessel	5 ft 6 in (1.68 m)	130 lb (59 kg)	August 28, 1991 (aged 28)	Madison, Wisconsin	Metropolitan Riveters (NWHL)
31	G	Aerin Frankel	5 ft 5 in (1.65 m)	140 lb (64 kg)	May 24, 1999 (aged 20)	New York, New York	Northeastern Huskies (HEA)
33	G	Alex Cavallini	5 ft 7 in (1.70 m)	155 lb (70 kg)	January 3, 1992 (aged 28)	Delafield, Wisconsin	Calgary Inferno (CWHL)
34	D	Savannah Harmon	5 ft 3 in (1.60 m)	148 lb (67 kg)	October 27, 1995 (aged 24)	Downers Grove, Illinois	—N/a
35	G	Maddie Rooney	5 ft 5 in (1.65 m)	145 lb (66 kg)	July 7, 1997 (aged 22)	Andover, Minnesota	Minnesota Duluth Bulldogs (WCHA)
36	F	Grace Zumwinkle	5 ft 9 in (1.75 m)	165 lb (75 kg)	April 23, 1999 (aged 20)	Excelsior, Minnesota	Minnesota Golden Gophers

=== 2019 IIHF Women's World Championship ===
The following is the United States roster for the women's ice hockey tournament at the 2019 IIHF Women's World Championship. The team won their fifth straight World Championship gold medal, defeating Canada 2–1 in a shootout in the gold medal game.

Head coach: Bob Corkum
Assistant coach: Joel Johnson, Brian Pothier

No.	Pos.	Name	Height	Weight	Birthdate	Hometown	Previous team
2	D	Lee Stecklein	6 ft 0 in (1.83 m)	170 lb (77 kg)	April 23, 1994 (aged 21)	Roseville, Minnesota	Minnesota Golden Gophers (WCHA)
3	D	Cayla Barnes	5 ft 2 in (1.57 m)	138 lb (63 kg)	January 7, 1999 (aged 20)	Eastvale, California	Boston College Eagles (HEA)
5	D	Megan Keller	5 ft 11 in (1.80 m)	165 lb (75 kg)	May 1, 1996 (aged 22)	Farmington Hills, Michigan	Boston College Eagles (HEA)
8	D	Emily Pfalzer	5 ft 2 in (1.57 m)	125 lb (57 kg)	June 14, 1993 (aged 25)	Buffalo, New York	Buffalo Beauts (NWHL)
9	D	Megan Bozek	5 ft 8 in (1.73 m)	176 lb (80 kg)	March 27, 1991 (aged 28)	Buffalo Grove, Illinois	Markham Thunder (CWHL)
12	F	Kelly Pannek	5 ft 8 in (1.73 m)	165 lb (75 kg)	December 29, 1995 (aged 23)	Plymouth, Minnesota	Minnesota Golden Gophers (WCHA)
14	F	Brianna Decker	5 ft 4 in (1.63 m)	148 lb (67 kg)	May 13, 1991 (aged 27)	Dousman, Wisconsin	Calgary Inferno (CWHL)
15	F	Sydney Brodt	5 ft 6 in (1.68 m)	140 lb (64 kg)	May 3, 1998 (aged 20)	North Oaks, Minnesota	Minnesota Duluth Bulldogs (WCHA)
16	F	Hayley Scamurra	5 ft 8 in (1.73 m)	161 lb (73 kg)	December 14, 1994 (aged 24)	Williamsville, New York	Buffalo Beauts (NWHL)
18	F	Jesse Compher	5 ft 8 in (1.73 m)	150 lb (68 kg)	July 1, 1999 (aged 19)	Northbrook, Illinois	Boston University Terriers (HEA)
20	F	Hannah Brandt	5 ft 6 in (1.68 m)	150 lb (68 kg)	November 27, 1993 (aged 25)	Vadnais Heights, Minnesota	Minnesota Whitecaps (NWHL)
21	F	Hilary Knight	5 ft 11 in (1.80 m)	172 lb (78 kg)	July 12, 1989 (aged 29)	Sun Valley, Idaho	Les Canadiennes de Montréal (CWHL)
22	D	Kacey Bellamy	5 ft 7 in (1.70 m)	145 lb (66 kg)	April 22, 1987 (aged 31)	Westfield, Massachusetts	Calgary Inferno (CWHL)
24	F	Dani Cameranesi	5 ft 5 in (1.65 m)	155 lb (70 kg)	June 30, 1995 (aged 23)	Plymouth, Minnesota	Buffalo Beauts (NWHL)
25	F	Alex Carpenter	5 ft 7 in (1.70 m)	155 lb (70 kg)	April 13, 1994 (aged 25)	North Reading, Massachusetts	Kunlun Red Star (CWHL)
26	F	Kendall Coyne Schofield	5 ft 2 in (1.57 m)	125 lb (57 kg)	May 25, 1992 (aged 26)	Palos Heights, Illinois	Minnesota Whitecaps (NWHL)
27	F	Annie Pankowski	5 ft 9 in (1.75 m)	165 lb (75 kg)	November 4, 1994 (aged 24)	Laguna Hills, California	Wisconsin Badgers (WCHA)
28	F	Amanda Kessel	5 ft 6 in (1.68 m)	130 lb (59 kg)	August 28, 1991 (aged 27)	Madison, Wisconsin	Metropolitan Riveters (NWHL)
31	G	Emma Polusny	5 ft 9 in (1.75 m)	164 lb (74 kg)	March 16, 1999 (aged 20)	Mound, Minnesota	St. Cloud State Huskies (WCHA)
32	D	Shelly Picard	5 ft 4 in (1.63 m)	150 lb (68 kg)	May 27, 1993 (aged 25)	Taunton, Massachusetts	Metropolitan Riveters (NWHL)
33	G	Alex Rigsby	5 ft 7 in (1.70 m)	155 lb (70 kg)	January 3, 1992 (aged 27)	Delafield, Wisconsin	Calgary Inferno (CWHL)
35	G	Maddie Rooney	5 ft 5 in (1.65 m)	145 lb (66 kg)	July 7, 1997 (aged 21)	Andover, Minnesota	Minnesota Duluth Bulldogs (WCHA)
39	F	Melissa Samoskevich	5 ft 4 in (1.63 m)	168 lb (76 kg)	March 31, 1997 (aged 22)	Sandy Hook, Connecticut	Quinnipiac Bobcats (ECAC)

=== 2017 IIHF Women's World Championship ===
The following is the United States roster for the women's ice hockey tournament at the 2017 IIHF Women's World Championship. The team won their fourth straight World Championship gold medal, defeating Canada 3–2 in overtime in the gold medal game.

Head coach: Robb Stauber
Assistant coach: Brett Strot, Paul Mara, Chris Tamer

No.	Pos.	Name	Height	Weight	Birthdate	Hometown	Previous team
2	D	Lee Stecklein	6 ft 0 in (1.83 m)	170 lb (77 kg)	April 23, 1994 (aged 22)	Roseville, Minnesota	Minnesota Golden Gophers (WCHA)
5	D	Megan Keller	5 ft 11 in (1.80 m)	150 lb (68 kg)	May 1, 1996 (aged 20)	Farmington, Michigan	Boston College Eagles (HEA)
6	D	Kali Flanagan	5 ft 5 in (1.65 m)	130 lb (59 kg)	September 19, 1995 (aged 21)	Burlington, Massachusetts	Boston College Eagles (HEA)
7	D	Monique Lamoureux-Morando	5 ft 6 in (1.68 m)	155 lb (70 kg)	July 3, 1989 (aged 27)	Grand Forks, North Dakota	Minnesota Whitecaps (WWHL)
8	D	Emily Pfalzer	5 ft 2 in (1.57 m)	125 lb (57 kg)	June 14, 1993 (aged 23)	Getzville, New York	Buffalo Beauts (NWHL)
9	D	Megan Bozek	5 ft 8 in (1.73 m)	170 lb (77 kg)	March 27, 1991 (aged 26)	Buffalo Grove, Illinois	Buffalo Beauts (NWHL)
10	F	Meghan Duggan	5 ft 10 in (1.78 m)	160 lb (73 kg)	September 3, 1987 (aged 29)	Danvers, Massachusetts	Boston Pride (NWHL)
11	F	Haley Skarupa	5 ft 6 in (1.68 m)	140 lb (64 kg)	January 3, 1994 (aged 23)	Rockville, Maryland	Connecticut Whale (NWHL)
12	F	Kelly Pannek	5 ft 8 in (1.73 m)	165 lb (75 kg)	December 29, 1995 (aged 21)	Plymouth, Minnesota	Minnesota Golden Gophers (WCHA)
14	F	Brianna Decker	5 ft 4 in (1.63 m)	148 lb (67 kg)	May 13, 1991 (aged 25)	Dousman, Wisconsin	Boston Pride (NWHL)
16	F	Kelli Stack	5 ft 4 in (1.63 m)	136 lb (62 kg)	January 13, 1988 (aged 29)	Brooklyn Heights, Ohio	Connecticut Whale (NWHL)
17	F	Jocelyne Lamoureux-Davidson	5 ft 6 in (1.68 m)	155 lb (70 kg)	July 3, 1989 (aged 27)	Grand Forks, North Dakota	Minnesota Whitecaps (WWHL)
19	F	Gigi Marvin	5 ft 8 in (1.73 m)	162 lb (73 kg)	March 7, 1987 (aged 30)	Warroad, Minnesota	Boston Pride (NWHL)
20	F	Hannah Brandt	5 ft 6 in (1.68 m)	150 lb (68 kg)	November 27, 1993 (aged 23)	Vadnais Heights, Minnesota	Minnesota Whitecaps (WWHL)
21	F	Hilary Knight	5 ft 11 in (1.80 m)	172 lb (78 kg)	July 12, 1989 (aged 27)	Sun Valley, Idaho	Boston Pride (NWHL)
22	D	Kacey Bellamy	5 ft 7 in (1.70 m)	145 lb (66 kg)	April 22, 1987 (aged 29)	Westfield, Massachusetts	Boston Pride (NWHL)
25	F	Alex Carpenter	5 ft 7 in (1.70 m)	155 lb (70 kg)	April 13, 1994 (aged 22)	North Reading, Massachusetts	Boston Pride (NWHL)
26	F	Kendall Coyne	5 ft 2 in (1.57 m)	125 lb (57 kg)	May 25, 1992 (aged 24)	Palos Heights, Illinois	Minnesota Whitecaps (WWHL)
28	F	Amanda Kessel	5 ft 6 in (1.68 m)	130 lb (59 kg)	August 28, 1991 (aged 25)	Madison, Wisconsin	New York Riveters (NWHL)
29	G	Nicole Hensley	5 ft 6 in (1.68 m)	155 lb (70 kg)	June 23, 1994 (aged 22)	Lakewood, Colorado	Lindenwood Lady Lions (CHA)
33	G	Alex Rigsby	5 ft 7 in (1.70 m)	155 lb (70 kg)	January 3, 1992 (aged 25)	Delafield, Wisconsin	Minnesota Whitecaps
35	G	Maddie Rooney	5 ft 6 in (1.68 m)	150 lb (68 kg)	July 7, 1997 (aged 19)	Andover, Minnesota	Minnesota Duluth Bulldogs (WCHA)
37	F	Amanda Pelkey	5 ft 3 in (1.60 m)	130 lb (59 kg)	May 29, 1993 (aged 23)	Montpelier, Vermont	Boston Pride (NWHL)

=== 2016 IIHF Women's World Championship ===
The following is the United States roster for the women's ice hockey tournament at the 2016 IIHF Women's World Championship. The team won their sixth World Championship gold medal in seven years, defeating Canada 1–0 in overtime in the gold medal game.

Head coach: Ken Klee
Assistant coach: Brett Strot, Chris Tamer

No.	Pos.	Name	Height	Weight	Birthdate	Hometown	Previous team
2	D	Lee Stecklein	6 ft 0 in (1.83 m)	170 lb (77 kg)	April 23, 1994 (aged 21)	Roseville, Minnesota	Minnesota Golden Gophers (WCHA)
5	D	Megan Keller	5 ft 11 in (1.80 m)	150 lb (68 kg)	May 1, 1996 (aged 19)	Farmington, Michigan	Boston College Eagles (HEA)
7	D	Monique Lamoureux	5 ft 6 in (1.68 m)	155 lb (70 kg)	July 3, 1989 (aged 26)	Grand Forks, North Dakota	Minnesota Whitecaps (WWHL)
8	D	Emily Pfalzer	5 ft 2 in (1.57 m)	125 lb (57 kg)	June 14, 1993 (aged 22)	Getzville, New York	Buffalo Beauts (NWHL)
9	D	Megan Bozek	5 ft 8 in (1.73 m)	170 lb (77 kg)	March 27, 1991 (aged 25)	Buffalo Grove, Illinois	Buffalo Beauts (NWHL)
10	F	Meghan Duggan	5 ft 10 in (1.78 m)	170 lb (77 kg)	September 3, 1987 (aged 28)	Danvers, Massachusetts	Buffalo Beauts (NWHL)
11	F	Haley Skarupa	5 ft 6 in (1.68 m)	140 lb (64 kg)	January 3, 1994 (aged 22)	Rockville, Maryland	Boston College Eagles (HEA)
14	F	Brianna Decker	5 ft 4 in (1.63 m)	148 lb (67 kg)	May 13, 1991 (aged 24)	Dousman, Wisconsin	Boston Pride (NWHL)
16	F	Kelli Stack	5 ft 5 in (1.65 m)	135 lb (61 kg)	January 13, 1988 (aged 28)	Brooklyn Heights, Ohio	Connecticut Whale (NWHL)
17	F	Jocelyne Lamoureux-Davidson	5 ft 6 in (1.68 m)	155 lb (70 kg)	July 3, 1989 (aged 26)	Grand Forks, North Dakota	Minnesota Whitecaps (WWHL)
21	F	Hilary Knight	5 ft 11 in (1.80 m)	172 lb (78 kg)	July 12, 1989 (aged 26)	Sun Valley, Idaho	Boston Pride (NWHL)
22	D	Kacey Bellamy	5 ft 7 in (1.70 m)	145 lb (66 kg)	April 22, 1987 (aged 28)	Westfield, Massachusetts	Boston Pride (NWHL)
23	D	Michelle Picard	5 ft 4 in (1.63 m)	150 lb (68 kg)	May 27, 1993 (aged 22)	Taunton, Massachusetts	Harvard Crimson (ECAC)
24	F	Shiann Darkangelo	5 ft 9 in (1.75 m)	145 lb (66 kg)	November 28, 1993 (aged 22)	Brighton, Michigan	Connecticut Whale (NWHL)
25	F	Alex Carpenter	5 ft 7 in (1.70 m)	155 lb (70 kg)	April 13, 1994 (aged 21)	North Reading, Massachusetts	Boston College Eagles (HEA)
26	F	Kendall Coyne	5 ft 2 in (1.57 m)	125 lb (57 kg)	May 25, 1992 (aged 23)	Palos Heights, Illinois	Northeastern Huskies (HEA)
27	F	Annie Pankowski	5 ft 8 in (1.73 m)	155 lb (70 kg)	November 4, 1994 (aged 21)	Laguna Hills, California	Wisconsin Badgers (WCHA)
30	G	Nicole Hensley	5 ft 6 in (1.68 m)	155 lb (70 kg)	June 23, 1994 (aged 21)	Lakewood, Colorado	Lindenwood Lady Lions (CHA)
31	G	Jessie Vetter	5 ft 8 in (1.73 m)	155 lb (70 kg)	December 19, 1985 (aged 30)	Cottage Grove, Wisconsin	Minnesota Whitecaps (WWHL)
32	F	Dana Trivigno	5 ft 4 in (1.63 m)	135 lb (61 kg)	January 7, 1994 (aged 22)	Setauket, New York	Boston College Eagles (HEA)
33	G	Alex Rigsby	5 ft 7 in (1.70 m)	155 lb (70 kg)	January 3, 1992 (aged 24)	Delafield, Wisconsin	Minnesota Whitecaps (WWHL)
36	F	Zoe Hickel	5 ft 6 in (1.68 m)	153 lb (69 kg)	July 10, 1992 (aged 23)	Anchorage, Alaska	Boston Pride (NWHL)
37	F	Amanda Pelkey	5 ft 3 in (1.60 m)	130 lb (59 kg)	May 29, 1993 (aged 22)	Montpelier, Vermont	Boston Pride (NWHL)

=== 2015 IIHF Women's World Championship ===
The following is the United States roster for the women's ice hockey tournament at the 2015 IIHF Women's World Championship. The team won their second straight World Championship gold medal, defeating Canada 7–5 in the gold medal game.

Head coach: Ken Klee
Assistant coach: Robb Stauber, Bob Deraney, Brett Strot

No.	Pos.	Name	Height	Weight	Birthdate	Hometown	Previous team
2	D	Lee Stecklein	6 ft 0 in (1.83 m)	170 lb (77 kg)	April 23, 1994 (aged 20)	Roseville, Minnesota	Minnesota Golden Gophers (WCHA)
5	D	Megan Keller	5 ft 10 in (1.78 m)	150 lb (68 kg)	May 1, 1996 (aged 18)	Farmington, Michigan	Boston College Eagles (HEA)
7	D	Monique Lamoureux	5 ft 6 in (1.68 m)	155 lb (70 kg)	July 3, 1989 (aged 25)	Grand Forks, North Dakota	Boston Blades (CWHL)
8	D	Emily Pfalzer	5 ft 2 in (1.57 m)	125 lb (57 kg)	June 14, 1993 (aged 21)	Getzville, New York	Boston College Eagles (HEA)
10	F	Meghan Duggan	5 ft 10 in (1.78 m)	170 lb (77 kg)	September 3, 1987 (aged 27)	Danvers, Massachusetts	Boston Blades (CWHL)
11	F	Haley Skarupa	5 ft 6 in (1.68 m)	140 lb (64 kg)	January 3, 1994 (aged 21)	Rockville, Maryland	Boston College Eagles (HEA)
14	F	Brianna Decker	5 ft 4 in (1.63 m)	148 lb (67 kg)	May 13, 1991 (aged 23)	Dousman, Wisconsin	Boston Blades (CWHL)
15	D	Anne Schleper	5 ft 10 in (1.78 m)	170 lb (77 kg)	January 30, 1990 (aged 25)	St. Cloud, Minnesota	Minnesota Golden Gophers (WCHA)
17	F	Jocelyne Lamoureux-Davidson	5 ft 6 in (1.68 m)	168 lb (76 kg)	July 3, 1989 (aged 25)	Grand Forks, North Dakota	North Dakota Fighting Hawks (WCHA)
18	F	Stephanie Anderson	5 ft 9 in (1.75 m)	165 lb (75 kg)	November 27, 1992 (aged 22)	North St. Paul, Minnesota	Bemidji State Beavers (WCHA)
20	F	Hannah Brandt	5 ft 6 in (1.68 m)	150 lb (68 kg)	November 27, 1993 (aged 21)	Vadnais Heights, Minnesota	Minnesota Golden Gophers (WCHA)
21	F	Hilary Knight	5 ft 11 in (1.80 m)	172 lb (78 kg)	July 12, 1989 (aged 25)	Sun Valley, Idaho	Boston Blades (CWHL)
22	D	Kacey Bellamy	5 ft 7 in (1.70 m)	145 lb (66 kg)	April 22, 1987 (aged 27)	Westfield, Massachusetts	Boston Blades (CWHL)
23	D	Michelle Picard	5 ft 4 in (1.63 m)	150 lb (68 kg)	May 27, 1993 (aged 21)	Taunton, Massachusetts	Harvard Crimson (ECAC)
24	F	Dani Cameranesi	5 ft 5 in (1.65 m)	145 lb (66 kg)	June 30, 1995 (aged 19)	Plymouth, Minnesota	Minnesota Golden Gophers (WCHA)
25	F	Alex Carpenter	5 ft 7 in (1.70 m)	155 lb (70 kg)	April 13, 1994 (aged 20)	North Reading, Massachusetts	Boston College Eagles (HEA)
26	F	Kendall Coyne	5 ft 2 in (1.57 m)	125 lb (57 kg)	May 25, 1992 (aged 22)	Palos Heights, Illinois	Northeastern Huskies (HEA)
27	F	Annie Pankowski	5 ft 8 in (1.73 m)	155 lb (70 kg)	November 4, 1994 (aged 20)	Laguna Hills, California	Wisconsin Badgers (WCHA)
30	G	Molly Schaus	5 ft 9 in (1.75 m)	156 lb (71 kg)	July 29, 1988 (aged 26)	Natick, Massachusetts	Boston College Eagles (HEA)
31	G	Jessie Vetter	5 ft 8 in (1.73 m)	155 lb (70 kg)	December 19, 1985 (aged 29)	Cottage Grove, Wisconsin	Wisconsin Badgers (WCHA)
32	F	Dana Trivigno	5 ft 4 in (1.63 m)	135 lb (61 kg)	January 7, 1994 (aged 21)	Setauket, New York	Boston College Eagles (HEA)
33	G	Alex Rigsby	5 ft 7 in (1.70 m)	155 lb (70 kg)	January 3, 1992 (aged 23)	Delafield, Wisconsin	Wisconsin Badgers (WCHA)
36	F	Zoe Hickel	5 ft 6 in (1.68 m)	153 lb (69 kg)	July 10, 1992 (aged 22)	Anchorage, Alaska	Minnesota Duluth Bulldogs (WCHA

=== 2013 IIHF Women's World Championship ===
The following is the United States roster for the women's ice hockey tournament at the 2013 IIHF Women's World Championship. The team defeated Canada 3–2 in the gold medal game, reclaiming the gold medal.

Head coach: Katey Stone
Assistant coach: Bobby Jay, Hilary Witt

No.	Pos.	Name	Height	Weight	Birthdate	Hometown	Previous team
2	D	Lee Stecklein	5 ft 11 in (1.80 m)	157 lb (71 kg)	April 23, 1994 (aged 18)	Roseville, Minnesota	Minnesota Golden Gophers (WCHA)
7	F	Monique Lamoureux	5 ft 6 in (1.68 m)	168 lb (76 kg)	July 3, 1989 (aged 23)	Grand Forks, North Dakota	North Dakota Fighting Hawks (WCHA)
9	D	Megan Bozek	5 ft 9 in (1.75 m)	170 lb (77 kg)	March 27, 1991 (aged 22)	Buffalo Grove, Illinois	Minnesota Golden Gophers (WCHA)
10	F	Meghan Duggan	5 ft 9 in (1.75 m)	163 lb (74 kg)	September 3, 1987 (aged 25)	Danvers, Massachusetts	Boston Blades (CWHL)
11	D	Lisa Chesson	5 ft 7 in (1.70 m)	152 lb (69 kg)	August 18, 1986 (aged 26)	Plainfield, Illinois	Ohio State Buckeyes (WCHA)
13	F	Julie Chu	5 ft 9 in (1.75 m)	148 lb (67 kg)	March 13, 1982 (aged 31)	Fairfield, Connecticut	Montreal Stars (CWHL)
14	F	Brianna Decker	5 ft 4 in (1.63 m)	150 lb (68 kg)	May 13, 1991 (aged 21)	Dousman, Wisconsin	Wisconsin Badgers (WCHA)
15	D	Anne Schleper	5 ft 10 in (1.78 m)	170 lb (77 kg)	January 30, 1990 (aged 23)	St. Cloud, Minnesota	Boston Blades (CWHL)
17	F	Jocelyne Lamoureux	5 ft 6 in (1.68 m)	154 lb (70 kg)	July 3, 1989 (aged 23)	Grand Forks, North Dakota	North Dakota Fighting Hawks (WCHA)
18	F	Lyndsey Fry	5 ft 7 in (1.70 m)	165 lb (75 kg)	October 30, 1992 (aged 20)	Chandler, Arizona	Harvard Crimson (ECAC)
19	D	Gigi Marvin	5 ft 9 in (1.75 m)	165 lb (75 kg)	March 7, 1987 (aged 26)	Warroad, Minnesota	Boston Blades (CWHL)
20	F	Jen Schoullis	5 ft 9 in (1.75 m)	170 lb (77 kg)	March 7, 1989 (aged 24)	Erie, Pennsylvania	Boston Blades (CWHL)
21	F	Hilary Knight	5 ft 10 in (1.78 m)	172 lb (78 kg)	July 12, 1989 (aged 23)	Sun Valley, Idaho	Boston Blades (CWHL)
22	D	Kacey Bellamy	5 ft 9 in (1.75 m)	143 lb (65 kg)	April 22, 1987 (aged 25)	Westfield, Massachusetts	Boston Blades (CWHL)
23	D	Michelle Picard	5 ft 6 in (1.68 m)	150 lb (68 kg)	May 27, 1993 (aged 19)	Taunton, Massachusetts	Harvard Crimson (ECAC)
25	F	Sarah Erickson	5 ft 6 in (1.68 m)	150 lb (68 kg)	March 28, 1990 (aged 23)	Roseau, Minnesota	Minnesota Golden Gophers (WCHA)
26	F	Kendall Coyne	5 ft 2 in (1.57 m)	130 lb (59 kg)	May 25, 1992 (aged 20)	Palos Heights, Illinois	Northeastern Huskies (HEA)
27	F	Kelley Steadman	5 ft 11 in (1.80 m)	159 lb (72 kg)	July 17, 1990 (aged 22)	Plattsburgh, New York	Boston Blades (CWHL)
28	F	Amanda Kessel	5 ft 6 in (1.68 m)	130 lb (59 kg)	September 28, 1991 (aged 21)	Verona, Wisconsin	Minnesota Golden Gophers (WCHA)
29	G	Brianne McLaughlin	5 ft 9 in (1.75 m)	130 lb (59 kg)	June 20, 1987 (aged 25)	Sheffield, Ohio	Robert Morris Colonials (CHA)
31	G	Jessie Vetter	5 ft 9 in (1.75 m)	143 lb (65 kg)	December 19, 1985 (aged 27)	Cottage Grove, Wisconsin	Wisconsin Badgers (WCHA)
33	G	Alex Rigsby	5 ft 7 in (1.70 m)	159 lb (72 kg)	January 3, 1992 (aged 21)	Delafield, Wisconsin	Wisconsin Badgers (WCHA)
36	F	Alex Carpenter	5 ft 6 in (1.68 m)	154 lb (70 kg)	April 13, 1994 (aged 18)	North Reading, Massachusetts	Boston College Eagles (HEA)

=== 2012 IIHF Women's World Championship ===
The following is the United States roster for the women's ice hockey tournament at the 2012 IIHF Women's World Championship. The team was unable to defend their three-time World Championship gold medal streak, losing to Canada 5–4 in overtime in the gold medal game.

Head coach: Katey Stone
Assistant coach: Laura Halldorson, Bobby Jay

No.	Pos.	Name	Height	Weight	Birthdate	Hometown	Previous team
1	G	Molly Schaus	5 ft 9 in (1.75 m)	156 lb (71 kg)	July 29, 1988 (aged 23)	Natick, Massachusetts	Boston Blades (CWHL)
2	F	Erika Lawler	5 ft 0 in (1.52 m)	130 lb (59 kg)	February 5, 1987 (aged 25)	Fitchburg, Massachusetts	Boston Blades (CWHL)
6	F	Jillian Dempsey	5 ft 4 in (1.63 m)	138 lb (63 kg)	January 19, 1991 (aged 21)	Winthrop, Massachusetts	Harvard Crimson (ECAC)
7	F	Monique Lamoureux	5 ft 6 in (1.68 m)	158 lb (72 kg)	July 3, 1989 (aged 22)	Grand Forks, North Dakota	North Dakota Fighting Hawks (WCHA)
11	D	Lisa Chesson	5 ft 7 in (1.70 m)	141 lb (64 kg)	August 18, 1986 (aged 25)	Plainfield, Illinois	Ohio State Buckeyes (WCHA)
12	F	Jenny Potter	5 ft 4 in (1.63 m)	151 lb (68 kg)	January 12, 1979 (aged 33)	Edina, Minnesota	Minnesota Whitecaps (WWHL)
13	F	Julie Chu	5 ft 8 in (1.73 m)	147 lb (67 kg)	March 13, 1982 (aged 30)	Fairfield, Connecticut	Montreal Stars (CWHL)
14	F	Brianna Decker	5 ft 4 in (1.63 m)	149 lb (68 kg)	May 13, 1991 (aged 20)	Dousman, Wisconsin	Wisconsin Badgers (WCHA)
15	D	Anne Schleper	5 ft 10 in (1.78 m)	167 lb (76 kg)	January 30, 1990 (aged 22)	St. Cloud, Minnesota	Minnesota Golden Gophers (WCHA)
16	F	Kelli Stack	5 ft 5 in (1.65 m)	136 lb (62 kg)	January 13, 1988 (aged 24)	Brooklyn Heights, Ohio	Boston Blades (CWHL)
17	F	Jocelyne Lamoureux	5 ft 6 in (1.68 m)	158 lb (72 kg)	July 3, 1989 (aged 22)	Grand Forks, North Dakota	North Dakota Fighting Hawks (WCHA)
19	D	Gigi Marvin	5 ft 8 in (1.73 m)	170 lb (77 kg)	March 7, 1987 (aged 25)	Warroad, Minnesota	Boston Blades (CWHL)
20	F	Hannah Brandt	5 ft 8 in (1.73 m)	169 lb (77 kg)	November 27, 1993 (aged 18)	Vadnais Heights, Minnesota	Hill-Murray School
21	F	Hilary Knight	5 ft 10 in (1.78 m)	172 lb (78 kg)	July 12, 1989 (aged 22)	Sun Valley, Idaho	Wisconsin Badgers (WCHA)
22	D	Kacey Bellamy	5 ft 8 in (1.73 m)	144 lb (65 kg)	April 22, 1987 (aged 24)	Westfield, Massachusetts	Boston Blades (CWHL)
23	D	Michelle Picard	5 ft 6 in (1.68 m)	156 lb (71 kg)	May 27, 1993 (aged 18)	Taunton, Massachusetts	Harvard Crimson (ECAC)
24	D	Josephine Pucci	5 ft 8 in (1.73 m)	149 lb (68 kg)	December 27, 1990 (aged 21)	Pearl River, New York	Harvard Crimson (ECAC)
25	D	Megan Bozek	5 ft 9 in (1.75 m)	168 lb (76 kg)	March 27, 1991 (aged 21)	Buffalo Grove, Illinois	Minnesota Golden Gophers (WCHA)
26	F	Kendall Coyne	5 ft 2 in (1.57 m)	124 lb (56 kg)	May 25, 1992 (aged 19)	Palos Heights, Illinois	Northeastern Huskies (HEA)
27	F	Taylor Wasylk	5 ft 10 in (1.78 m)	148 lb (67 kg)	February 21, 1992 (aged 20)	Port Huron, Michigan	Boston College Eagles (HEA)
28	F	Amanda Kessel	5 ft 6 in (1.68 m)	131 lb (59 kg)	August 28, 1991 (aged 20)	Verona, Wisconsin	Minnesota Golden Gophers (WCHA)
29	G	Brianne McLaughlin	5 ft 8 in (1.73 m)	130 lb (59 kg)	June 20, 1987 (aged 24)	Sheffield, Ohio	Robert Morris Colonials (CHA)
31	G	Jessie Vetter	5 ft 8 in (1.73 m)	154 lb (70 kg)	December 19, 1985 (aged 26)	Cottage Grove, Wisconsin	Wisconsin Badgers (WCHA)

=== 2011 IIHF Women's World Championship ===
The following is the United States roster for the women's ice hockey tournament at the 2011 IIHF Women's World Championship. The team won their third straight World Championship gold medal, defeating Canada 3–2 in overtime in the gold medal game.

Head coach: Katey Stone
Assistant coach: Hilary Witt, Mark Hudak

No.	Pos.	Name	Height	Weight	Birthdate	Hometown	Previous team
1	G	Molly Schaus	5 ft 8 in (1.73 m)	148 lb (67 kg)	July 29, 1988 (aged 22)	Natick, Massachusetts	Boston College Eagles (HEA)
3	F	Jen Schoullis	5 ft 9 in (1.75 m)	165 lb (75 kg)	March 7, 1989 (aged 22)	Erie, Pennsylvania	Minnesota Golden Gophers (WCHA)
4	D	Angela Ruggiero	5 ft 9 in (1.75 m)	192 lb (87 kg)	January 3, 1980 (aged 31)	Simi Valley, California	Boston Blades (CWHL)
7	F	Monique Lamoureux	5 ft 6 in (1.68 m)	156 lb (71 kg)	July 3, 1989 (aged 21)	Grand Forks, North Dakota	North Dakota Fighting Hawks (WCHA)
8	D	Caitlin Cahow	5 ft 4 in (1.63 m)	156 lb (71 kg)	May 20, 1985 (aged 25)	Branford, Connecticut	Boston Blades (CWHL)
9	D	Molly Engstrom	5 ft 9 in (1.75 m)	178 lb (81 kg)	March 1, 1983 (aged 28)	Siren, Wisconsin	Brampton Thunder (CWHL)
10	F	Meghan Duggan	5 ft 9 in (1.75 m)	164 lb (74 kg)	September 3, 1987 (aged 23)	Danvers, Massachusetts	Wisconsin Badgers (WCHA)
12	F	Jenny Potter	5 ft 4 in (1.63 m)	145 lb (66 kg)	January 12, 1979 (aged 32)	Edina, Minnesota	Minnesota Whitecaps (WWHL)
13	F	Julie Chu	5 ft 8 in (1.73 m)	147 lb (67 kg)	March 13, 1982 (aged 29)	Fairfield, Connecticut	Montreal Stars (CWHL)
14	F	Brianna Decker	5 ft 4 in (1.63 m)	152 lb (69 kg)	May 13, 1991 (aged 19)	Dousman, Wisconsin	Wisconsin Badgers (WCHA)
15	D	Anne Schleper	5 ft 10 in (1.78 m)	167 lb (76 kg)	January 30, 1990 (aged 21)	St. Cloud, Minnesota	Minnesota Golden Gophers (WCHA)
16	F	Kelli Stack	5 ft 5 in (1.65 m)	130 lb (59 kg)	January 13, 1988 (aged 23)	Brooklyn Heights, Ohio	Boston College Eagles (HEA)
17	F	Jocelyne Lamoureux	5 ft 6 in (1.68 m)	154 lb (70 kg)	July 3, 1989 (aged 21)	Grand Forks, North Dakota	North Dakota Fighting Hawks (WCHA)
19	F	Gigi Marvin	5 ft 8 in (1.73 m)	166 lb (75 kg)	March 7, 1987 (aged 24)	Warroad, Minnesota	Minnesota Whitecaps (WWHL)
21	F	Hilary Knight	5 ft 10 in (1.78 m)	172 lb (78 kg)	July 12, 1989 (aged 21)	Sun Valley, Idaho	Wisconsin Badgers (WCHA)
22	D	Kacey Bellamy	5 ft 8 in (1.73 m)	143 lb (65 kg)	April 22, 1987 (aged 24)	Westfield, Massachusetts	Boston Blades (CWHL)
24	D	Josephine Pucci	5 ft 8 in (1.73 m)	157 lb (71 kg)	December 27, 1990 (aged 20)	Pearl River, New York	Harvard Crimson (ECAC)
26	F	Kendall Coyne	5 ft 2 in (1.57 m)	130 lb (59 kg)	May 25, 1992 (aged 18)	Palos Heights, Illinois	Berkshire School
27	F	Kelley Steadman	5 ft 11 in (1.80 m)	160 lb (73 kg)	July 17, 1990 (aged 20)	Plattsburgh, New York	Mercyhurst Lakers (CHA)
29	G	Brianne McLaughlin	5 ft 8 in (1.73 m)	130 lb (59 kg)	June 20, 1987 (aged 23)	Sheffield, Ohio	Burlington Barracudas (CWHL)
31	G	Jessie Vetter	5 ft 8 in (1.73 m)	169 lb (77 kg)	December 19, 1985 (aged 25)	Cottage Grove, Wisconsin	Wisconsin Badgers (WCHA)

=== 2009 IIHF Women's World Championship ===
The following is the United States roster for the women's ice hockey tournament at the 2009 IIHF Women's World Championship. The team successfully defended their World Championship gold medal, defeating Canada 4–1 in the gold medal game.

Head coach: Mark Johnson
Assistant coach: Dave Flint, Jodi McKenna

No.	Pos.	Name	Height	Weight	Birthdate	Hometown	Previous team
1	G	Molly Schaus	5 ft 8 in (1.73 m)	148 lb (67 kg)	July 29, 1988 (aged 20)	Natick, Massachusetts	Boston College Eagles (HEA)
2	F	Erika Lawler	5 ft 0 in (1.52 m)	130 lb (59 kg)	February 5, 1987 (aged 22)	Fitchburg, Massachusetts	Wisconsin Badgers (WCHA)
4	D	Angela Ruggiero	5 ft 9 in (1.75 m)	192 lb (87 kg)	January 3, 1980 (aged 29)	Harper Woods, Michigan	US Women's Select Team / Minnesota Whitecaps (WWHL)
5	F	Karen Thatcher	5 ft 8 in (1.73 m)	164 lb (74 kg)	February 29, 1984 (aged 25)	Blaine, Washington	US Women's Select Team / Minnesota Whitecaps (WWHL)
6	D	Helen Resor	5 ft 9 in (1.75 m)	142 lb (64 kg)	October 18, 1985 (aged 23)	Greenwich, Connecticut	Yale Bulldogs (ECAC)
8	D	Caitlin Cahow	5 ft 4 in (1.63 m)	156 lb (71 kg)	May 20, 1985 (aged 23)	Branford, Connecticut	US Women's Select Team / Minnesota Whitecaps (WWHL)
9	D	Molly Engstrom	5 ft 9 in (1.75 m)	178 lb (81 kg)	March 1, 1983 (aged 26)	Siren, Wisconsin	US Women's Select Team / Minnesota Whitecaps (WWHL)
10	F	Meghan Duggan	5 ft 9 in (1.75 m)	164 lb (74 kg)	September 3, 1987 (aged 21)	Danvers, Massachusetts	Wisconsin Badgers (WCHA)
11	D	Lisa Chesson	5 ft 6 in (1.68 m)	152 lb (69 kg)	August 18, 1986 (aged 22)	Plainfield, Illinois	US Women's Select Team / Minnesota Whitecaps (WWHL)
12	F	Jenny Potter	5 ft 4 in (1.63 m)	145 lb (66 kg)	January 12, 1979 (aged 30)	Edina, Minnesota	US Women's Select Team / Minnesota Whitecaps (WWHL)
13	F	Julie Chu	5 ft 8 in (1.73 m)	147 lb (67 kg)	March 13, 1982 (aged 27)	Fairfield, Connecticut	US Women's Select Team / Minnesota Whitecaps (WWHL)
16	F	Kelli Stack	5 ft 5 in (1.65 m)	130 lb (59 kg)	January 13, 1988 (aged 21)	Brooklyn Heights, Ohio	Boston College Eagles (HEA)
17	F	Jocelyne Lamoureux	5 ft 6 in (1.68 m)	154 lb (70 kg)	July 3, 1989 (aged 19)	Grand Forks, North Dakota	Minnesota Golden Gophers (WCHA)
19	F	Gigi Marvin	5 ft 8 in (1.73 m)	166 lb (75 kg)	March 7, 1987 (aged 22)	Warroad, Minnesota	Minnesota Golden Gophers (WCHA)
20	F	Natalie Darwitz	5 ft 3 in (1.60 m)	137 lb (62 kg)	October 13, 1983 (aged 25)	Eagan, Minnesota	US Women's Select Team
21	F	Hilary Knight	5 ft 10 in (1.78 m)	172 lb (78 kg)	July 12, 1989 (aged 19)	Hanover, New Hampshire	Wisconsin Badgers (WCHA)
22	D	Kacey Bellamy	5 ft 8 in (1.73 m)	143 lb (65 kg)	April 22, 1987 (aged 21)	Westfield, Massachusetts	New Hampshire Wildcats (HEA)
23	D	Kerry Weiland	5 ft 4 in (1.63 m)	142 lb (64 kg)	October 18, 1980 (aged 28)	Palmer, Alaska	US Women's Select Team
27	F	Monique Lamoureux	5 ft 6 in (1.68 m)	156 lb (71 kg)	July 3, 1989 (aged 19)	Grand Forks, North Dakota	Minnesota Golden Gophers (WCHA)
29	G	Megan Van Beusekom	5 ft 8 in (1.73 m)	170 lb (77 kg)	December 14, 1981 (aged 27)	Loretto, Minnesota	US Women's Select Team / Minnesota Whitecaps (WWHL)
31	G	Jessie Vetter	5 ft 8 in (1.73 m)	169 lb (77 kg)	December 19, 1985 (aged 23)	Cottage Grove, Wisconsin	Wisconsin Badgers (WCHA)

=== 2008 IIHF Women's World Championship ===
The following is the United States roster for the women's ice hockey tournament at the 2008 IIHF Women's World Championship. The team won the World Championship gold medal for the second time, outscoring Canada 4–3 in the gold medal game.

Head coach: Jackie Barto
Assistant coach: Paul Flanagan, Kevin Houle

No.	Pos.	Name	Height	Weight	Birthdate	Hometown	Previous team
1	G	Molly Schaus	5 ft 8 in (1.73 m)	172 lb (78 kg)	July 29, 1988 (aged 19)	Natick, Massachusetts	Boston College Eagles (HEA)
2	F	Erika Lawler	5 ft 0 in (1.52 m)	130 lb (59 kg)	February 5, 1987 (aged 21)	Fitchburg, Massachusetts	Wisconsin Badgers (WCHA)
4	D	Angela Ruggiero	5 ft 9 in (1.75 m)	188 lb (85 kg)	January 3, 1980 (aged 28)	Harper Woods, Michigan	Minnesota Whitecaps (WWHL)
5	F	Karen Thatcher	5 ft 8 in (1.73 m)	164 lb (74 kg)	February 29, 1984 (aged 24)	Douglas, Massachusetts	Vaughan Flames (CWHL)
8	D	Caitlin Cahow	5 ft 4 in (1.63 m)	155 lb (70 kg)	May 20, 1985 (aged 22)	Branford, Connecticut	Harvard Crimson women's ice hockey (ECAC)
9	D	Molly Engstrom	5 ft 9 in (1.75 m)	174 lb (79 kg)	March 1, 1983 (aged 25)	Siren, Wisconsin	Brampton Thunder (CWHL)
10	F	Meghan Duggan	5 ft 9 in (1.75 m)	164 lb (74 kg)	September 3, 1987 (aged 20)	Danvers, Massachusetts	Wisconsin Badgers (WCHA)
12	F	Jenny Potter	5 ft 4 in (1.63 m)	140 lb (64 kg)	January 12, 1979 (aged 29)	Edina, Minnesota	Minnesota Whitecaps (WWHL)
13	D	Julie Chu	5 ft 8 in (1.73 m)	145 lb (66 kg)	March 13, 1982 (aged 26)	Fairfield, Connecticut	Minnesota Whitecaps (WWHL)
14	F	Jessica Koizumi	5 ft 4 in (1.63 m)	144 lb (65 kg)	April 15, 1985 (aged 22)	Simi Valley, California	Minnesota Whitecaps (WWHL)
15	F	Kelli Stack	5 ft 5 in (1.65 m)	130 lb (59 kg)	January 13, 1988 (aged 20)	Brooklyn Heights, Ohio	Boston College Eagles (HEA)
16	F	Sam Faber	5 ft 4 in (1.63 m)	131 lb (59 kg)	May 8, 1987 (aged 20)	Mount Sinai, New York	New Hampshire Wildcats (HEA)
18	F	Gigi Marvin	5 ft 8 in (1.73 m)	165 lb (75 kg)	March 7, 1987 (aged 21)	Warroad, Minnesota	Minnesota Golden Gophers (WCHA)
20	F	Natalie Darwitz	5 ft 3 in (1.60 m)	138 lb (63 kg)	October 13, 1983 (aged 24)	Eagan, Minnesota	Minnesota Whitecaps (WWHL)
21	F	Hilary Knight	5 ft 10 in (1.78 m)	172 lb (78 kg)	July 12, 1989 (aged 18)	Hanover, New Hampshire	Wisconsin Badgers (WCHA)
22	D	Kacey Bellamy	5 ft 8 in (1.73 m)	143 lb (65 kg)	April 22, 1987 (aged 20)	Westfield, Massachusetts	New Hampshire Wildcats (HEA)
23	D	Kerry Weiland	5 ft 4 in (1.63 m)	140 lb (64 kg)	October 18, 1980 (aged 27)	Palmer, Alaska	Vaughan Flames (CWHL)
26	D	Rachael Drazan	5 ft 6 in (1.68 m)	150 lb (68 kg)	January 11, 1986 (aged 22)	Orono, Minnesota	Minnesota Golden Gophers (WCHA)
27	F	Sarah Parsons	5 ft 8 in (1.73 m)	144 lb (65 kg)	July 27, 1987 (aged 20)	Dover, Massachusetts	Dartmouth Big Green (ECAC)
31	G	Jessie Vetter	5 ft 8 in (1.73 m)	169 lb (77 kg)	December 19, 1985 (aged 22)	Cottage Grove, Wisconsin	Wisconsin Badgers (WCHA)

=== 2007 IIHF Women's World Championship ===
The following is the United States roster for the women's ice hockey tournament at the 2007 IIHF Women's World Championship. The team won the silver medal, losing to Canada 5–1 in the gold medal game.

Head coach: Mark Johnson
Assistant coach: Hilary Witt, Erin Whitten Hamlen

No.	Pos.	Name	Height	Weight	Birthdate	Hometown	Previous team
2	F	Erika Lawler	5 ft 0 in (1.52 m)	134 lb (61 kg)	February 5, 1987 (aged 20)	Fitchburg, Massachusetts	Wisconsin Badgers (WCHA)
3	F	Jinelle Zaugg	6 ft 0 in (1.83 m)	183 lb (83 kg)	March 27, 1986 (aged 21)	Eagle River, Wisconsin	Wisconsin Badgers (WCHA)
4	D	Angela Ruggiero	5 ft 9 in (1.75 m)	185 lb (84 kg)	January 3, 1980 (aged 27)	Harper Woods, Michigan	2006 Olympic Women's Team
6	D	Helen Resor	5 ft 9 in (1.75 m)	146 lb (66 kg)	October 18, 1985 (aged 21)	Greenwich, Connecticut	Yale Bulldogs (ECAC)
7	F	Krissy Wendell	5 ft 6 in (1.68 m)	156 lb (71 kg)	September 12, 1981 (aged 25)	Brooklyn Park, Minnesota	Etobicoke Dolphins (NWHL)
8	D	Caitlin Cahow	5 ft 4 in (1.63 m)	157 lb (71 kg)	May 20, 1985 (aged 21)	Branford, Connecticut	Harvard Crimson (ECAC)
9	D	Molly Engstrom	5 ft 9 in (1.75 m)	174 lb (79 kg)	March 1, 1983 (aged 24)	Siren, Wisconsin	2006 Olympic Women's Team
10	F	Meghan Duggan	5 ft 9 in (1.75 m)	160 lb (73 kg)	September 3, 1987 (aged 19)	Danvers, Massachusetts	Wisconsin Badgers (WCHA)
11	D	Kelli Halcisak	5 ft 8 in (1.73 m)	150 lb (68 kg)	January 26, 1982 (aged 25)	Grosse Ile Township, Michigan	East Coast Wizards Senior A
12	F	Jenny Potter	5 ft 4 in (1.63 m)	145 lb (66 kg)	January 12, 1979 (aged 28)	Edina, Minnesota	2006 Olympic Women's Team
13	D	Julie Chu	5 ft 8 in (1.73 m)	150 lb (68 kg)	March 13, 1982 (aged 25)	Fairfield, Connecticut	Harvard Crimson (ECAC)
16	F	Hilary Knight	5 ft 10 in (1.78 m)	170 lb (77 kg)	July 12, 1989 (aged 17)	Hanover, New Hampshire	Choate Rosemary Hall
17	F	Tiffany Hagge	5 ft 9 in (1.75 m)	162 lb (73 kg)	May 3, 1984 (aged 22)	Minneapolis, Minnesota	Mississauga Aeros (NWHL)
18	F	Gigi Marvin	5 ft 8 in (1.73 m)	165 lb (75 kg)	March 7, 1987 (aged 20)	Warroad, Minnesota	Minnesota Golden Gophers (WCHA)
19	F	Kristin King	5 ft 4 in (1.63 m)	142 lb (64 kg)	July 21, 1979 (aged 27)	Piqua, Ohio	Minnesota Whitecaps (WWHL)
20	F	Natalie Darwitz	5 ft 3 in (1.60 m)	133 lb (60 kg)	October 13, 1983 (aged 23)	Eagan, Minnesota	Minnesota Whitecaps (WWHL)
23	D	Kerry Weiland	5 ft 4 in (1.63 m)	133 lb (60 kg)	October 18, 1980 (aged 26)	Palmer, Alaska	Etobicoke Dolphins (NWHL)
27	F	Sarah Parsons	5 ft 8 in (1.73 m)	135 lb (61 kg)	July 27, 1987 (aged 19)	Dover, Massachusetts	Dartmouth Big Green (ECAC)
30	G	Chanda Gunn	5 ft 7 in (1.70 m)	141 lb (64 kg)	January 27, 1980 (aged 27)	Huntington Beach, California	US Women's Select Team
31	G	Jessie Vetter	5 ft 8 in (1.73 m)	164 lb (74 kg)	December 19, 1985 (aged 21)	Cottage Grove, Wisconsin	Wisconsin Badgers (WCHA)

=== 2005 IIHF Women's World Championship ===
The following is the United States roster for the women's ice hockey tournament at the 2005 IIHF Women's World Championship. The team finally won the World Championship gold medal, besting Canada 1–0 in a shootout in the gold medal game.

Head coach: Ben Smith
Assistant coach: Alana Blahoski, Tim Gerrish, Mike Gilligan

No.	Pos.	Name	Height	Weight	Birthdate	Hometown	Previous team
1	G	Megan Van Beusekom	5 ft 9 in (1.75 m)	175 lb (79 kg)	December 14, 1981 (aged 23)	Loretto, Minnesota	Minnesota Whitecaps (WWHL)
3	D	Courtney Kennedy	5 ft 10 in (1.78 m)	190 lb (86 kg)	March 29, 1979 (aged 26)	Woburn, Massachusetts	Vancouver Griffins (NWHL)
4	D	Angela Ruggiero (A)	5 ft 9 in (1.75 m)	190 lb (86 kg)	January 3, 1980 (aged 25)	Harper Woods, Michigan	Montreal Axion (NWHL)
5	D	Lyndsay Wall	5 ft 8 in (1.73 m)	143 lb (65 kg)	May 12, 1985 (aged 19)	Churchville, New York	Minnesota Golden Gophers (WCHA)
6	D	Helen Resor	5 ft 10 in (1.78 m)	154 lb (70 kg)	October 18, 1985 (aged 19)	Greenwich, Connecticut	Yale Bulldogs (ECAC)
7	F	Krissy Wendell	5 ft 6 in (1.68 m)	155 lb (70 kg)	September 12, 1981 (aged 23)	Brooklyn Park, Minnesota	Minnesota Golden Gophers (WCHA)
9	D	Molly Engstrom	5 ft 8 in (1.73 m)	170 lb (77 kg)	March 1, 1983 (aged 22)	Siren, Wisconsin	Wisconsin Badgers (WCHA)
10	F	Kim Insalaco	5 ft 6 in (1.68 m)	145 lb (66 kg)	November 4, 1980 (aged 24)	Rochester, New York	Oakville Ice (NWHL)
11	D	Jamie Hagerman	5 ft 9 in (1.75 m)	170 lb (77 kg)	May 7, 1981 (aged 23)	North Andover, Massachusetts	U.S. Women's Select Team
12	F	Jenny Potter (A)	5 ft 4 in (1.63 m)	145 lb (66 kg)	January 12, 1979 (aged 26)	Eagan, Minnesota	U.S. Women's Select Team
13	D	Julie Chu	5 ft 8 in (1.73 m)	155 lb (70 kg)	March 13, 1982 (aged 23)	Fairfield, Connecticut	Harvard Crimson (ECAC)
14	F	Kelly Stephens	5 ft 6 in (1.68 m)	140 lb (64 kg)	June 4, 1983 (aged 21)	Seattle, Washington	Minnesota Golden Gophers (WCHA)
15	F	Shelley Looney	5 ft 5 in (1.65 m)	140 lb (64 kg)	January 21, 1972 (aged 33)	Brownstown Township, Michigan	US Women's Select Team
18	F	Kathleen Kauth	5 ft 8 in (1.73 m)	150 lb (68 kg)	March 28, 1979 (aged 26)	Saratoga Springs, New York	Brampton Thunder (NWHL)
19	F	Kristin King	5 ft 4 in (1.63 m)	135 lb (61 kg)	July 21, 1979 (aged 25)	Piqua, Ohio	Oakville Ice (NWHL)
20	F	Katie King	5 ft 8 in (1.73 m)	170 lb (77 kg)	May 24, 1975 (aged 29)	Salem, New Hampshire	U.S. Women's Select Team
21	F	Cammi Granato (C)	5 ft 7 in (1.70 m)	140 lb (64 kg)	March 25, 1971 (aged 34)	Downers Grove, Illinois	B.C. Breakers (WWHL)
22	F	Natalie Darwitz	5 ft 2 in (1.57 m)	130 lb (59 kg)	October 13, 1983 (aged 21)	Eagan, Minnesota	Minnesota Golden Gophers (WCHA)
27	F	Sarah Parsons	5 ft 9 in (1.75 m)	143 lb (65 kg)	July 27, 1987 (aged 17)	Dover, Massachusetts	Noble and Greenough School
30	G	Chanda Gunn	5 ft 7 in (1.70 m)	138 lb (63 kg)	January 27, 1980 (aged 25)	Huntington Beach, California	U.S. Women's Select Team

=== 2004 IIHF Women's World Championship ===
The following is the United States roster for the women's ice hockey tournament at the 2004 IIHF Women's World Championship. The team won the silver medal once again, losing 2–0 to Canada in the gold medal game.

Head coach: Ben Smith
Assistant coach: Alana Blahoski, Tim Gerrish, Mike Gilligan

No.	Pos.	Name	Height	Weight	Birthdate	Hometown	Previous team
3	D	Molly Engstrom	5 ft 9 in (1.75 m)	170 lb (77 kg)	March 1, 1983 (aged 21)	Siren, Wisconsin	Wisconsin Badgers (WCHA)
4	D	Angela Ruggiero	5 ft 9 in (1.75 m)	190 lb (86 kg)	January 3, 1980 (aged 24)	Harper Woods, Michigan	Harvard Crimson (ECAC)
6	D	Julianne Vasichek	5 ft 10 in (1.78 m)	175 lb (79 kg)	February 9, 1983 (aged 21)	Great Falls, Montana	Minnesota Duluth Bulldogs (WCHA)
7	F	Kelly Stephens	5 ft 6 in (1.68 m)	140 lb (64 kg)	June 4, 1983 (aged 20)	Seattle, Washington	Minnesota Golden Gophers (WCHA)
8	D	Kerry Weiland	5 ft 4 in (1.63 m)	135 lb (61 kg)	October 18, 1980 (aged 23)	Palmer, Alaska	US Women's Select Team
9	F	Andrea Kilbourne	5 ft 6 in (1.68 m)	175 lb (79 kg)	April 19, 1980 (aged 23)	Saranac Lake, New York	Princeton Tigers (ECAC)
10	D	Kim Insalaco	5 ft 6 in (1.68 m)	145 lb (66 kg)	November 4, 1980 (aged 23)	Rochester, New York	Oakville Ice (NWHL)
12	F	Jenny Potter	5 ft 4 in (1.63 m)	145 lb (66 kg)	January 12, 1979 (aged 25)	Eagan, Minnesota	Minnesota Duluth Bulldogs (WCHA)
13	F	Julie Chu	5 ft 8 in (1.73 m)	155 lb (70 kg)	March 13, 1982 (aged 22)	Fairfield, Connecticut	Harvard Crimson (ECAC)
15	F	Shelley Looney	5 ft 5 in (1.65 m)	140 lb (64 kg)	January 21, 1972 (aged 32)	Brownstown Charter Township, Michigan	Vancouver Griffins (NWHL)
17	F	Krissy Wendell	5 ft 6 in (1.68 m)	155 lb (70 kg)	September 12, 1981 (aged 22)	Brooklyn Park, Minnesota	Minnesota Golden Gophers (WCHA)
18	F	Kathleen Kauth	5 ft 8 in (1.73 m)	150 lb (68 kg)	March 28, 1979 (aged 25)	Saratoga Springs, New York	Brampton Thunder (NWHL)
19	F	Kristin King	5 ft 4 in (1.63 m)	135 lb (61 kg)	July 21, 1979 (aged 24)	Piqua, Ohio	Oakville Ice (WCHA)
20	F	Katie King	5 ft 9 in (1.75 m)	170 lb (77 kg)	May 24, 1975 (aged 28)	Salem, New Hampshire	US Women's Select Team
21	F	Cammi Granato	5 ft 7 in (1.70 m)	140 lb (64 kg)	March 25, 1971 (aged 33)	Downers Grove, Illinois	Vancouver Griffins (NWHL)
22	F	Natalie Darwitz	5 ft 2 in (1.57 m)	130 lb (59 kg)	October 13, 1983 (aged 20)	Eagan, Minnesota	Minnesota Golden Gophers (WCHA)
25	F	Tricia Dunn	5 ft 8 in (1.73 m)	150 lb (68 kg)	April 25, 1974 (aged 29)	Derry, New Hampshire	US Women's Select Team
26	D	Kelli Halcisak	5 ft 8 in (1.73 m)	145 lb (66 kg)	January 26, 1982 (aged 22)	Grosse Ile Township, Michigan	Providence Friars (HEA)
30	G	Chanda Gunn	5 ft 7 in (1.70 m)	138 lb (63 kg)	January 27, 1980 (aged 24)	Huntington Beach, California	Northeastern Huskies (HEA)
31	G	Pam Dreyer	5 ft 5 in (1.65 m)	155 lb (70 kg)	August 9, 1981 (aged 22)	Eagle River, Alaska	US Women's Select Team

=== 2001 IIHF Women's World Championship ===
This is the United States roster for the women's ice hockey tournament at the 2001 IIHF Women's World Championship. Yet again, the team won the silver medal, losing 3–2 to Canada in the gold medal game.

Head coach: Ben Smith
Assistant coach: Julie Sasner

No.	Pos.	Name	Height	Weight	Birthdate	Hometown	Previous team
1	G	Sara DeCosta	5 ft 10 in (1.78 m)	130 lb (59 kg)	May 13, 1977 (aged 23)	Warwick, Rhode Island	US Women's National Team
3	D	Winny Brodt	5 ft 5 in (1.65 m)	130 lb (59 kg)	February 18, 1978 (aged 23)	Roseville, Minnesota	US Women's National Team
4	D	Angela Ruggiero	5 ft 9 in (1.75 m)	190 lb (86 kg)	January 3, 1980 (aged 21)	Simi Valley, California	US Women's National Team
5	D	Nicki Luongo	5 ft 4 in (1.63 m)	155 lb (70 kg)	February 9, 1976 (aged 25)	Tyngsborough, Massachusetts	US Women's National Team
6	D	Karyn Bye	5 ft 8 in (1.73 m)	165 lb (75 kg)	May 18, 1971 (aged 29)	River Falls, Wisconsin	US Women's National Team
7	D	Sue Merz	5 ft 5 in (1.65 m)	145 lb (66 kg)	April 10, 1972 (aged 28)	Greenwich, Connecticut	US Women's National Team
11	D	A. J. Mleczko	5 ft 11 in (1.80 m)	160 lb (73 kg)	June 14, 1975 (aged 25)	Nantucket, Massachusetts	US Women's National Team
12	F	Jenny Schmidgall	5 ft 4 in (1.63 m)	145 lb (66 kg)	January 12, 1979 (aged 22)	Eagan, Minnesota	US Women's National Team
13	F	Julie Chu	5 ft 8 in (1.73 m)	155 lb (70 kg)	March 13, 1982 (aged 19)	Fairfield, Connecticut	US Women's National Team
15	F	Shelley Looney	5 ft 5 in (1.65 m)	140 lb (64 kg)	January 21, 1972 (aged 29)	Brownstown Township, Michigan	US Women's National Team
17	F	Krissy Wendell	5 ft 6 in (1.68 m)	155 lb (70 kg)	September 12, 1981 (aged 19)	Brooklyn Park, Minnesota	US Women's National Team
18	F	Alana Blahoski	5 ft 7 in (1.70 m)	132 lb (60 kg)	April 29, 1974 (aged 26)	Saint Paul, Minnesota	US Women's National Team
19	F	Annamarie Holmes	5 ft 8 in (1.73 m)	150 lb (68 kg)	May 16, 1979 (aged 21)	Apple Valley, Minnesota	US Women's National Team
20	F	Katie King	5 ft 9 in (1.75 m)	179 lb (81 kg)	May 24, 1975 (aged 25)	Salem, New Hampshire	US Women's National Team
21	F	Cammi Granato	5 ft 7 in (1.70 m)	140 lb (64 kg)	March 25, 1971 (aged 30)	Downers Grove, Illinois	US Women's National Team
22	F	Natalie Darwitz	5 ft 2 in (1.57 m)	130 lb (59 kg)	October 13, 1983 (aged 17)	Eagan, Minnesota	US Women's National Team
24	F	Chris Bailey	5 ft 6 in (1.68 m)	160 lb (73 kg)	February 5, 1972 (aged 29)	Marietta, New York	US Women's National Team
25	F	Tricia Dunn	5 ft 8 in (1.73 m)	150 lb (68 kg)	April 25, 1974 (aged 26)	Derry, New Hampshire	US Women's National Team
26	F	Carisa Zaban	5 ft 7 in (1.70 m)	135 lb (61 kg)	September 12, 1977 (aged 23)	Glenview, Illinois	US Women's National Team
29	G	Sarah Tueting	5 ft 7 in (1.70 m)	140 lb (64 kg)	April 26, 1976 (aged 24)	Winnetka, Illinois	US Women's National Team

=== 2000 IIHF Women's World Championship ===
The following is the United States roster for the women's ice hockey tournament at the 2000 IIHF Women's World Championship. The team won the silver medal once again, losing 3–2 in overtime to Canada in the gold medal game.

Head coach: Ben Smith
Assistant coach: David Quinn, Colleen Coyne

No.	Pos.	Name	Height	Weight	Birthdate	Hometown	Previous team
1	G	Sara DeCosta	5 ft 9 in (1.75 m)	135 lb (61 kg)	May 13, 1977 (aged 22)	Warwick, Rhode Island	Providence Friars (ECAC)
4	D	Angela Ruggiero	5 ft 9 in (1.75 m)	175 lb (79 kg)	January 3, 1980 (aged 20)	Simi Valley, California	Harvard Crimson (ECAC)
5	D	Nicki Luongo	5 ft 4 in (1.63 m)	155 lb (70 kg)	February 9, 1976 (aged 24)	Tyngsborough, Massachusetts	US Women's Select Team
6	F	Karyn Bye	5 ft 8 in (1.73 m)	165 lb (75 kg)	May 18, 1971 (aged 28)	River Falls, Wisconsin	US Women's Select Team
7	D	Sue Merz	5 ft 5 in (1.65 m)	145 lb (66 kg)	April 10, 1972 (aged 27)	Greenwich, Connecticut	US Women's Select Team
8	F	Laurie Baker	5 ft 7 in (1.70 m)	135 lb (61 kg)	November 6, 1976 (aged 23)	Concord, Massachusetts	US Women's Select Team
9	D	Winny Brodt	5 ft 5 in (1.65 m)	130 lb (59 kg)	February 18, 1978 (aged 22)	Roseville, Minnesota	Minnesota Golden Gophers (WCHA)
10	F	Brandy Fisher	5 ft 5 in (1.65 m)	150 lb (68 kg)	October 28, 1975 (aged 24)	Colton, New York	US Women's Select Team
11	D	A. J. Mleczko	5 ft 11 in (1.80 m)	160 lb (73 kg)	June 14, 1975 (aged 24)	Nantucket, Massachusetts	US Women's Select Team
12	F	Jenny Schmidgall	5 ft 4 in (1.63 m)	145 lb (66 kg)	January 12, 1979 (aged 21)	Eagan, Minnesota	Minnesota Golden Gophers (WCHA)
15	F	Shelley Looney	5 ft 5 in (1.65 m)	140 lb (64 kg)	January 21, 1972 (aged 28)	Brownstown Township, Michigan	US Women's Select Team
17	F	Krissy Wendell	5 ft 7 in (1.70 m)	155 lb (70 kg)	September 12, 1981 (aged 18)	Brooklyn Park, Minnesota	Park Center Senior High School
18	F	Alana Blahoski	5 ft 7 in (1.70 m)	132 lb (60 kg)	April 29, 1974 (aged 25)	Saint Paul, Minnesota	US Women's Select Team
19	F	Stephanie O'Sullivan	5 ft 7 in (1.70 m)	150 lb (68 kg)	July 30, 1971 (aged 28)	Dorchester, Massachusetts	US Women's Select Team
20	F	Katie King	5 ft 9 in (1.75 m)	180 lb (82 kg)	May 24, 1975 (aged 24)	Salem, New Hampshire	US Women's Select Team
21	F	Cammi Granato	5 ft 7 in (1.70 m)	140 lb (64 kg)	March 25, 1971 (aged 29)	Downers Grove, Illinois	US Women's Select Team
22	F	Natalie Darwitz	5 ft 2 in (1.57 m)	130 lb (59 kg)	October 13, 1983 (aged 16)	Eagan, Minnesota	Eagan High School
24	D	Chris Bailey	5 ft 6 in (1.68 m)	160 lb (73 kg)	February 5, 1972 (aged 28)	Marietta, New York	US Women's Select Team
25	F	Tricia Dunn	5 ft 8 in (1.73 m)	150 lb (68 kg)	April 25, 1974 (aged 25)	Derry, New Hampshire	US Women's Select Team
29	G	Sarah Tueting	5 ft 7 in (1.70 m)	140 lb (64 kg)	April 26, 1976 (aged 23)	Winnetka, Illinois	US Women's Select Team

=== 1999 IIHF Women's World Championship ===
The following is the United States roster for the women's ice hockey tournament at the 1999 IIHF Women's World Championship. The team won the silver medal once again, losing 3–1 to Canada in the gold medal game.

Head coach: Ben Smith
Assistant coach: David Quinn

No.	Pos.	Name	Height	Weight	Birthdate	Hometown	Previous team
1	G	Laurie Belliveau	5 ft 5 in (1.65 m)	161 lb (73 kg)	September 17, 1976 (aged 22)	Manchester, Massachusetts	Yale Bulldogs (ECAC)
2	D	Amy Coelho	5 ft 8 in (1.73 m)	154 lb (70 kg)	May 24, 1975 (aged 23)	North Truro, Massachusetts	Concordia Cardinals (WHAC)
4	D	Angela Ruggiero	5 ft 9 in (1.75 m)	190 lb (86 kg)	January 3, 1980 (aged 19)	Harrison Township, Michigan	Harvard Crimson (ECAC)
6	F	Karyn Bye	5 ft 8 in (1.73 m)	165 lb (75 kg)	May 18, 1971 (aged 27)	River Falls, Wisconsin	US Women's Select Team
7	D	Sue Merz	5 ft 5 in (1.65 m)	150 lb (68 kg)	April 10, 1972 (aged 26)	Greenwich, Connecticut	US Women's Select Team
8	D	Tara Mounsey	5 ft 6 in (1.68 m)	150 lb (68 kg)	March 12, 1978 (aged 21)	Concord, New Hampshire	Brown Bears (ECAC)
10	F	Brandy Fisher	5 ft 5 in (1.65 m)	150 lb (68 kg)	October 28, 1975 (aged 23)	Colton, New York	New Hampshire Wildcats (ECAC)
12	F	Jenny Schmidgall	5 ft 4 in (1.63 m)	146 lb (66 kg)	January 12, 1979 (aged 20)	Edina, Minnesota	Minnesota Golden Gophers (WCHA)
14	D	Catherine Hanson	5 ft 4 in (1.63 m)	126 lb (57 kg)	June 6, 1976 (aged 22)	Marquette, Michigan	Providence Friars (ECAC)
15	F	Shelley Looney	5 ft 5 in (1.65 m)	146 lb (66 kg)	January 21, 1972 (aged 27)	Brownstown Township, Michigan	US Women's Select Team
17	F	Krissy Wendell	5 ft 7 in (1.70 m)	154 lb (70 kg)	September 12, 1981 (aged 17)	Brooklyn Park, Minnesota	Park Center Senior High School
18	F	Alana Blahoski	5 ft 7 in (1.70 m)	126 lb (57 kg)	April 29, 1974 (aged 24)	Saint Paul, Minnesota	US Women's Select Team
19	F	Stephanie O'Sullivan	5 ft 7 in (1.70 m)	150 lb (68 kg)	July 30, 1971 (aged 27)	Dorchester, Massachusetts	US Women's National Team
20	F	Katie King	5 ft 9 in (1.75 m)	170 lb (77 kg)	May 24, 1975 (aged 23)	Salem, New Hampshire	US Women's Select Team
21	F	Cammi Granato	5 ft 7 in (1.70 m)	141 lb (64 kg)	March 25, 1971 (aged 27)	Downers Grove, Illinois	US Women's Select Team
22	F	Natalie Darwitz	5 ft 3 in (1.60 m)	134 lb (61 kg)	October 13, 1983 (aged 15)	Eagan, Minnesota	Eagan High School
24	D	Chris Bailey	5 ft 6 in (1.68 m)	161 lb (73 kg)	February 5, 1972 (aged 27)	Marietta, New York	US Women's Select Team
25	F	Tricia Dunn	5 ft 8 in (1.73 m)	146 lb (66 kg)	April 25, 1974 (aged 24)	Derry, New Hampshire	US Women's Select Team
27	F	Sarah Hood	5 ft 9 in (1.75 m)	170 lb (77 kg)	February 1, 1976 (aged 23)	Keweenaw Bay, Michigan	Dartmouth Big Green (ECAC)
34	G	Erin Whitten	5 ft 5 in (1.65 m)	161 lb (73 kg)	October 10, 1971 (aged 27)	Glens Falls, New York	US Women's National Team

=== 1997 IIHF Women's World Championship ===
The following is the United States roster for the women's ice hockey tournament at the 1997 IIHF Women's World Championship. The team won the silver medal at the Women's World Championship, losing 4–3 to Canada in the gold medal game.

Head coach: Ben Smith
Assistant coach: Tom Mutch, Peter Haberl

No.	Pos.	Name	Height	Weight	Birthdate	Hometown	Previous team
1	G	Kelly Dyer	5 ft 11 in (1.80 m)	172 lb (78 kg)	March 1, 1966 (aged 31)	Boston, Massachusetts	Toronto Aeros (OWHA)
2	D	Amy Coelho	5 ft 8 in (1.73 m)	160 lb (73 kg)	May 24, 1975 (aged 21)	North Truro, Massachusetts	Dartmouth Big Green (ECAC)
3	F	Lisa Brown-Miller	5 ft 1 in (1.55 m)	128 lb (58 kg)	November 16, 1966 (aged 30)	Union Lake, Michigan	US Women's Training Team
4	D	Angela Ruggiero	5 ft 9 in (1.75 m)	175 lb (79 kg)	January 3, 1980 (aged 17)	Harrison Township, Michigan	Choate Rosemary Hall
5	D	Colleen Coyne	5 ft 3 in (1.60 m)	131 lb (59 kg)	September 19, 1971 (aged 25)	East Falmouth, Massachusetts	US Women's Training Team
6	F	Karyn Bye	5 ft 8 in (1.73 m)	160 lb (73 kg)	May 18, 1971 (aged 25)	River Falls, Wisconsin	US Women's Training Team
7	d	Sue Merz	5 ft 5 in (1.65 m)	145 lb (66 kg)	April 10, 1972 (aged 24)	Greenwich, Connecticut	Newtonbrook Panthers (COWHL)
8	D	Tara Mounsey	5 ft 6 in (1.68 m)	150 lb (68 kg)	March 12, 1978 (aged 19)	Concord, New Hampshire	Brown Bears (ECAC)
9	F	Sandra Whyte	5 ft 7 in (1.70 m)	130 lb (59 kg)	August 24, 1970 (aged 26)	Saugus, Massachusetts	US Women's Training Team
10	F	Andrea Kilbourne	5 ft 6 in (1.68 m)	150 lb (68 kg)	April 19, 1980 (aged 16)	Saranac Lake, New York	Northwood School
11	F	A. J. Mleczko	5 ft 11 in (1.80 m)	160 lb (73 kg)	June 14, 1975 (aged 21)	Nantucket, Massachusetts	US Women's Training Team
12	D	Sue Reece	5 ft 5 in (1.65 m)	135 lb (61 kg)	September 2, 1973 (aged 23)	Dover, New Hampshire	US Women's Training Team
14	D	Vicki Movsessian	5 ft 5 in (1.65 m)	140 lb (64 kg)	November 6, 1972 (aged 24)	Lexington, Massachusetts	US Women's Training Team
15	F	Shelley Looney	5 ft 5 in (1.65 m)	140 lb (64 kg)	January 21, 1972 (aged 25)	Trenton, Michigan	US Women's Training Team
16	F	Meaghan Sittler	5 ft 6 in (1.68 m)	155 lb (70 kg)	March 12, 1976 (aged 21)	East Amherst, New York	Colby Mules (NECSAC)
17	F	Jeanine Sobek	5 ft 5 in (1.65 m)	145 lb (66 kg)	February 22, 1972 (aged 25)	Coon Rapids, Minnesota	Newtonbrook Panthers (COWHL)
18	F	Alana Blahoski	5 ft 7 in (1.70 m)	127 lb (58 kg)	April 29, 1974 (aged 22)	Saint Paul, Minnesota	US Women's Training Team
19	F	Stephanie O'Sullivan	5 ft 7 in (1.70 m)	145 lb (66 kg)	July 30, 1971 (aged 25)	Dorchester, Massachusetts	US Women's Training Team
20	F	Katie King	5 ft 8 in (1.73 m)	165 lb (75 kg)	May 24, 1975 (aged 21)	Salem, New Hampshire	Brown Bears (ECAC)
21	F	Cammi Granato	5 ft 7 in (1.70 m)	140 lb (64 kg)	March 25, 1971 (aged 26)	Downers Grove, Illinois	Concordia Cardinals (WHAC)
22	F	Gretchen Ulion	5 ft 2 in (1.57 m)	130 lb (59 kg)	May 4, 1972 (aged 24)	Marlborough, Connecticut	US Women's Training Team
23	F	Barb Gordon	5 ft 5 in (1.65 m)	135 lb (61 kg)	October 11, 1974 (aged 22)	Glendale, California	Colby Mules (NECSAC)
24	D	Chris Bailey	5 ft 6 in (1.68 m)	160 lb (73 kg)	February 5, 1972 (aged 25)	Marietta, New York	US Women's Training Team
25	F	Tricia Dunn	5 ft 8 in (1.73 m)	142 lb (64 kg)	April 25, 1974 (aged 22)	Derry, New Hampshire	US Women's Training Team
26	F	Michele Amidon	5 ft 6 in (1.68 m)	140 lb (64 kg)	June 7, 1972 (aged 24)	Harpswell, Maine	US Women's Training Team
27	D	Kelly O'Leary	5 ft 10 in (1.78 m)	168 lb (76 kg)	January 19, 1968 (aged 29)	Auburn, Massachusetts	US Women's Training Team
28	F	Laurie Baker	5 ft 6 in (1.68 m)	140 lb (64 kg)	November 6, 1976 (aged 20)	Concord, Massachusetts	Providence Friars (ECAC)
29	G	Sarah Tueting	5 ft 7 in (1.70 m)	140 lb (64 kg)	April 26, 1976 (aged 20)	Winnetka, Illinois	US Women's Training Team
30	G	Sara DeCosta	5 ft 9 in (1.75 m)	130 lb (59 kg)	May 13, 1977 (aged 19)	Warwick, Rhode Island	Providence Friars (ECAC)
34	G	Erin Whitten	5 ft 5 in (1.65 m)	136 lb (62 kg)	October 26, 1971 (aged 25)	Glens Falls, New York	US Women's Training Team

=== 1994 IIHF Women's World Championship ===
The following is the United States roster for the women's ice hockey tournament at the 1994 IIHF Women's World Championship. The team won the silver medal at the Women's World Championship, losing 6–3 to Canada in the gold medal game.

Head coach: (United States) Karen Kay
Assistant coach: (United States) John Marchetti

No.	Pos.	Name	Height	Weight	Birthdate	Hometown	Previous team
1	G	Kelly Dyer	5 ft 11 in (1.80 m)	172 lb (78 kg)	March 1, 1966 (aged 28)	Boston, Massachusetts	Daytona (MAWHL)
2	D	Vicki Movsessian	5 ft 5 in (1.65 m)	141 lb (64 kg)	November 6, 1971 (aged 22)	Lexington, Massachusetts	Providence Friars (ECAC)
3	F	Lisa Brown	5 ft 1 in (1.55 m)	126 lb (57 kg)	January 16, 1966 (aged 28)	Union Lake, Michigan	Providence Friars (ECAC)
4	F	Shawna Davidson	5 ft 8 in (1.73 m)	170 lb (77 kg)	June 23, 1970 (aged 23)	Duluth, Minnesota	Minnesota Duluth Bulldogs
5	D	Colleen Coyne	5 ft 3 in (1.60 m)	130 lb (59 kg)	September 19, 1971 (aged 22)	East Falmouth, Massachusetts	New Hampshire Wildcats (ECAC)
6	F	Karyn Bye	5 ft 8 in (1.73 m)	165 lb (75 kg)	May 18, 1971 (aged 22)	River Falls, Wisconsin	Concordia Cardinals (WHAC)
7	F	Sue Merz	5 ft 5 in (1.65 m)	150 lb (68 kg)	April 10, 1972 (aged 22)	Greenwich, Connecticut	New Hampshire Wildcats (ECAC)
8	F	Gretchen Ulion	5 ft 2 in (1.57 m)	130 lb (59 kg)	May 4, 1972 (aged 21)	Marlborough, Connecticut	Dartmouth Big Green (ECAC)
9	F	Sandra Whyte	5 ft 7 in (1.70 m)	130 lb (59 kg)	August 24, 1970 (aged 23)	Saugus, Massachusetts	SC Lagenthal Damen (SWHL)
10	F	Cindy Curley	5 ft 5 in (1.65 m)	141 lb (64 kg)	November 12, 1963 (aged 30)	Leominster, Massachusetts	Assabet Valley Patriots (MBHL)
11	D	Michele DiFronzo	–	–	February 17, 1967 (aged 27)	Chelmsford, Massachusetts	Hudson Nighthawks
12	F	Stephanie Boyd	–	–	December 11, 1972 (aged 21)	Kilworth, Ontario	Toronto Varsity Blues (OUA)
15	F	Shelley Looney	5 ft 5 in (1.65 m)	146 lb (66 kg)	January 21, 1972 (aged 22)	Trenton, Michigan	Northeastern Huskies (HEA)
17	F	Jeanine Sobek	5 ft 5 in (1.65 m)	134 lb (61 kg)	February 22, 1972 (aged 22)	Coon Rapids, Minnesota	Northeastern Huskies (HEA)
20	F	Beth Beagan	5 ft 4 in (1.63 m)	119 lb (54 kg)	October 20, 1970 (aged 23)	East Falmouth, Massachusetts	Hobomock Hawks
21	F	Cammi Granato	5 ft 7 in (1.70 m)	141 lb (64 kg)	March 25, 1971 (aged 23)	Downers Grove, Illinois	Concordia Cardinals (WHAC)
24	D	Chris Bailey	5 ft 6 in (1.68 m)	161 lb (73 kg)	February 5, 1972 (aged 22)	Marietta, New York	Providence Friars (ECAC)
27	D	Kelly O'Leary	5 ft 10 in (1.78 m)	168 lb (76 kg)	January 19, 1968 (aged 26)	Auburn, Massachusetts	EHC St. Gallen (SWHL)
28	D	Stephanie O'Sullivan	5 ft 7 in (1.70 m)	150 lb (68 kg)	July 30, 1971 (aged 22)	Dorchester, Massachusetts	Providence Friars (ECAC)
30	G	Erin Whitten	5 ft 5 in (1.65 m)	161 lb (73 kg)	October 10, 1971 (aged 22)	Glens Falls, New York	Dallas Freeze (CHL)

=== 1992 IIHF Women's World Championship ===
The following is the United States roster for the women's ice hockey tournament at the 1992 IIHF Women's World Championship. The team won the silver medal at the Women's World Championship, losing 8–0 to Canada in the gold medal game.

Head coach: (United States) Russ McCurdy
Assistant coach: (United States) Digit Murphy

No.	Pos.	Name	Height	Weight	Birthdate	Hometown	Previous team
1	F	Jennifer Hanley	–	–	March 10, 1973 (aged 19)	Edina, Minnesota	Hamline University (MIAC)
2	D	Lauren Apollo	5 ft 10 in (1.78 m)	170 lb (77 kg)	June 17, 1963 (aged 28)	Scituate, Massachusetts	Assabet Valley Patriots (MBHL)
3	F	Lisa Brown	5 ft 1 in (1.55 m)	126 lb (57 kg)	January 16, 1966 (aged 26)	Union Lake, Michigan	Providence Friars (ECAC)
4	F	Shawna Davidson	5 ft 8 in (1.73 m)	170 lb (77 kg)	June 23, 1970 (aged 21)	Duluth, Minnesota	New Hampshire Wildcats (ECAC)
5	D	Ellen Weinberg	–	–	July 8, 1969 (aged 22)	Dallas, Texas	New Hampshire Wildcats (ECAC)
6	F	Karyn Bye	5 ft 8 in (1.73 m)	126 lb (57 kg)	May 18, 1971 (aged 20)	River Falls, Wisconsin	New Hampshire Wildcats (ECAC)
7	F	Sue Merz	5 ft 5 in (1.65 m)	150 lb (68 kg)	April 10, 1972 (aged 20)	Greenwich, Connecticut	New Hampshire Wildcats (ECAC)
8	F	Michele Amidon	5 ft 8 in (1.73 m)	140 lb (64 kg)	June 7, 1972 (aged 19)	Portland, Connecticut	St. Lawrence Saints (ECAC)
9	F	Sandra Whyte	5 ft 7 in (1.70 m)	130 lb (59 kg)	August 24, 1970 (aged 21)	Saugus, Massachusetts	Harvard Crimson (ECAC)
10	F	Cindy Curley	5 ft 5 in (1.65 m)	141 lb (64 kg)	November 12, 1963 (aged 28)	Leominster, Massachusetts	Assabet Valley Patriots (MBHL)
11	F	Kathy Issel	–	–	October 5, 1973 (aged 18)	Ann Arbor, Michigan	Princeton Tigers (ECAC)
12	F	Shelley Looney	5 ft 5 in (1.65 m)	146 lb (66 kg)	January 21, 1972 (aged 20)	Trenton, Michigan	Northeastern Huskies (ECAC)
14	F	Tina Cardinale	5 ft 7 in (1.70 m)	150 lb (68 kg)	October 20, 1966 (aged 25)	Hudson, Massachusetts	Hudson Nighthawks
15	F	Colleen Coyne	5 ft 3 in (1.60 m)	130 lb (59 kg)	September 19, 1971 (aged 20)	East Falmouth, Massachusetts	New Hampshire Wildcats (ECAC)
16	F	Wendy Tatarouns	–	–	November 20, 1972 (aged 19)	Billerica, Massachusetts	Assabet Valley Patriots (MBHL)
17	F	Jeanine Sobek	5 ft 5 in (1.65 m)	134 lb (61 kg)	February 22, 1972 (aged 20)	Coon Rapids, Minnesota	Northeastern Huskies (ECAC)
19	F	Kim Haman	–	–	June 28, 1973 (aged 18)	Fairbanks, Alaska	Northeastern Huskies (ECAC)
20	F	Beth Beagan	5 ft 4 in (1.63 m)	119 lb (54 kg)	October 20, 1970 (aged 21)	East Falmouth, Massachusetts	Providence Friars (ECAC)
21	F	Cammi Granato	5 ft 7 in (1.70 m)	141 lb (64 kg)	March 25, 1971 (aged 21)	Downers Grove, Illinois	Providence Friars (ECAC)
27	D	Kelly O'Leary	5 ft 10 in (1.78 m)	168 lb (76 kg)	January 19, 1968 (aged 24)	Auburn, Massachusetts	Providence Friars (ECAC)
29	G	Kelly Dyer	5 ft 11 in (1.80 m)	172 lb (78 kg)	March 1, 1966 (aged 26)	Boston, Massachusetts	Assabet Valley Patriots (MBHL)
30	G	Erin Whitten	5 ft 5 in (1.65 m)	161 lb (73 kg)	October 10, 1971 (aged 20)	Glens Falls, New York	New Hampshire Wildcats (ECAC)

=== 1990 IIHF Women's World Championship ===
The following is the United States roster for the women's ice hockey tournament at the 1990 IIHF Women's World Championship. The team won the silver medal at the inaugural Women's World Championship, losing 5–2 to Canada in the gold medal game.

Head coach: (United States) Don MacLeod
Assistant coach: (United States) Karen Kay

No.	Pos.	Name	Height	Weight	Birthdate	Hometown	Previous team
–	D	Lauren Apollo	5 ft 10 in (1.78 m)	170 lb (77 kg)	June 17, 1963 (aged 26)	Scituate, Massachusetts	Assabet Valley Patriots (MBHL)
–	F	Tina Cardinale	5 ft 7 in (1.70 m)	150 lb (68 kg)	October 20, 1966 (aged 23)	Hudson, Massachusetts	Hudson Nighthawks
–	F	Heidi Chalupnik	5 ft 3 in (1.60 m)	126 lb (57 kg)	September 21, 1968 (aged 21)	Fairbanks, Alaska	New Hampshire Wildcats (ECAC)
–	F	Maria Dennis	5 ft 2 in (1.57 m)	119 lb (54 kg)	February 8, 1966 (aged 24)	South Windsor, Connecticut	Georgetown Hoyas ACHA
–	F	Kimberly Eisenried	5 ft 3 in (1.60 m)	130 lb (59 kg)	November 14, 1966 (aged 23)	West Seneca, New York	Cheektowaga Warriors
–	G	Mary Jones	5 ft 5 in (1.65 m)	139 lb (63 kg)	March 14, 1960 (aged 30)	Madison, Wisconsin	Wisconsin
–	D	Kelley Owen	5 ft 10 in (1.78 m)	170 lb (77 kg)	May 19, 1962 (aged 27)	Golden Valley, Minnesota	Delaware Bobcats (MAWHL)
–	D	Judy Parish	5 ft 9 in (1.75 m)	154 lb (70 kg)	February 24, 1969 (aged 21)	Hanover, New Hampshire	Dartmouth Big Green (ECAC)
–	F	Yvonne Percy	5 ft 8 in (1.73 m)	141 lb (64 kg)	May 23, 1964 (aged 25)	South Hadley, Massachusetts	Assabet Valley Patriots (MBHL)
–	F	Julie Sasner	5 ft 7 in (1.70 m)	146 lb (66 kg)	January 3, 1966 (aged 24)	Cambridge, Massachusetts	Assabet Valley Patriots (MBHL)
–	D	Sharon Stidsen	5 ft 7 in (1.70 m)	159 lb (72 kg)	January 30, 1964 (aged 26)	Waltham, Massachusetts	Hudson Nighthawks
1	G	Kelly Dyer	5 ft 11 in (1.80 m)	172 lb (78 kg)	March 1, 1966 (aged 24)	Boston, Massachusetts	Assabet Valley Patriots (MBHL)
3	F	Lisa Brown	5 ft 1 in (1.55 m)	126 lb (57 kg)	January 16, 1966 (aged 24)	Union Lake, Michigan	Providence Friars (ECAC)
4	F	Shawna Davidson	5 ft 8 in (1.73 m)	170 lb (77 kg)	June 23, 1970 (aged 19)	Duluth, Minnesota	New Hampshire Wildcats (ECAC)
7	F	Sue Merz	5 ft 5 in (1.65 m)	150 lb (68 kg)	April 10, 1972 (aged 17)	Greenwich, Connecticut	Connecticut Polar Bears (T1EHL)
10	F	Cindy Curley	5 ft 5 in (1.65 m)	141 lb (64 kg)	November 12, 1963 (aged 26)	Leominster, Massachusetts	Assabet Valley Patriots (MBHL)
17	F	Jeanine Sobek	5 ft 5 in (1.65 m)	134 lb (61 kg)	February 22, 1972 (aged 18)	Coon Rapids, Minnesota	Minnesota Thoroughbreds (T1EHL)
20	F	Beth Beagan	5 ft 4 in (1.63 m)	119 lb (54 kg)	October 20, 1970 (aged 19)	East Falmouth, Massachusetts	Providence Friars (ECAC)
21	F	Cammi Granato	5 ft 7 in (1.70 m)	141 lb (64 kg)	March 25, 1971 (aged 19)	Downers Grove, Illinois	Providence Friars (ECAC)
27	D	Kelly O'Leary	5 ft 10 in (1.78 m)	168 lb (76 kg)	January 19, 1968 (aged 22)	Auburn, Massachusetts	Providence Friars (ECAC)

== See also ==
- List of Canadian women's national ice hockey team rosters
- United States women's national ice hockey team
