= Jeanine Sobek =

American ice hockey player (born 1972)

- Born: February 22, 1972 (age 54) Coon Rapids, MN, USA
- Height: 5 ft 5 in (165 cm)
- Weight: 145 lb (66 kg; 10 st 5 lb)
- Position: Forward
- Shot: Left
- Hockey East COWHL team: Northeastern Huskies; Newtonbrook Panthers
- National team: United States
- Playing career: 1990–1997
Medal record
Representing United States
Women's ice hockey
IIHF World Women's Championships
| Silver medal – second place | 1990 Canada | Tournament |
| Silver medal – second place | 1992 Finland | Tournament |
| Silver medal – second place | 1994 United States | Tournament |

Jeanine Sobek (born February 22, 1972) is a former women's ice hockey player from Minnesota. She competed for the Northeastern Huskies in Hockey East of the NCAA. During the 2000-01 NWHL season, she competed for the Brampton Thunder.

== Playing career ==
As a child, she would skate on the outdoor rinks near Coon Rapids, Minnesota.

=== College career ===
Sobek led the Huskies in scoring in 1991-92 (46 points) and 1992-93 (42 points), respectively. For two consecutive campaigns, Sobek led the Huskies in goals scored with 21 (1992–93) and 24 (1993–94). During the 1991–92 season, Sobek was also the Huskies' leader in assists with 34. The following season (1992–93), she tied Rayanne Conway for the assists lead with 21.

In 106 career contests with the Huskies, she registered 159 points. As of 2010, her 77 goals were fifth all-time among all Huskies skaters, while her 82 assists also ranked fifth.

=== USA Hockey ===
From 1990 to 1997, she was a member of the United States women's national team. During the national team's 1997 tour, she participated in a 9–0 defeat of her former school. Despite being a national team member for seven years, she was not on the final roster for the 1998 Winter Olympics in Nagano, Japan.

== Career statistics ==
=== International ===
| Year | Team | Event | Result | GP | G | A | Pts | PIM |
|---|---|---|---|---|---|---|---|---|
| 1990 | USA | WC | 2nd place, silver medalist(s) | 5 | - | - | - | - |
