= 2010–11 WWHL season =

The 2010–11 WWHL season consisted of 4 teams: Strathmore Rockies, Edmonton Chimos, Minnesota Whitecaps and a new team Manitoba Maple Leafs. The Calgary Oval X-Treme suspended active participation in the league in 2009–10. They anticipate resuming active participation for the 2011–12 season.

== Regular season Schedule ==
Date	Teams	Score
October 29, 2010	Manitoba Maple Leafs @ Minnesota Whitecaps	Minnesota, 12-2
October 30, 2010	Manitoba Maple Leafs @ Minnesota Whitecaps	Minnesota, 9-0
October 30, 2010	Edmonton Chimos @ Strathmore Rockies	Edmonton, 2-0
October 31, 2010	Manitoba Maple Leafs @ Minnesota Whitecaps	Minnesota, 7-3
November 5, 2010	Edmonton Chimos @ Manitoba Maple Leafs	Manitoba, 5-2
November 6, 2010	Edmonton Chimos @ Manitoba Maple Leafs	Edmonton, 6-4
November 7, 2010	Edmonton Chimos @ Manitoba Maple Leafs	Edmonton, 3-2
November 26, 2010	Manitoba Maple Leafs @ Strathmore Rockies	GAME CANCELLED
November 27, 2010	Manitoba Maple Leafs @ Strathmore Rockies	GAME CANCELLED
November 28, 2010	Manitoba Maple Leafs @ Strathmore Rockies	GAME CANCELLED
December 3, 2010	Edmonton Chimos @ Minnesota Whitecaps	Minnesota, 4-3
December 4, 2010	Edmonton Chimos @ Minnesota Whitecaps	Minnesota,4-3
December 5, 2010	Edmonton Chimos @ Minnesota Whitecaps	Minnesota, 5-2
December 10, 2010	Strathmore Rockies @ Edmonton Chimos	Edmonton,2-1
December 12, 2010	Edmonton Chimos @ Strathmore Rockies	Edmonton, 5-3
December 17, 2010	Minnesota Whitecaps @ Manitoba Maple Leafs	Minnesota, 9-4
December 18, 2010	Minnesota Whitecaps @ Manitoba Maple Leafs	Minnesota, 8-3
December 19, 2010	Minnesota Whitecaps @ Manitoba Maple Leafs	Minnesota, 7-5
January 21, 2011	Minnesota Whitecaps @ Strathmore Rockies	Minnesota, 8-3
January 22, 2011	Minnesota Whitecaps @ Strathmore Rockies	Minnesota, 6-3
January 23, 2011	Minnesota Whitecaps @ Strathmore Rockies	Minnesota, 9-3
February 4, 2011	Strathmore Rockies @ Minnesota Whitecaps	Minnesota, 11-2
February 5, 2011	Strathmore Rockies @ Minnesota Whitecaps	Minnesota, 7-0
February 6, 2011	Strathmore Rockies @ Minnesota Whitecaps	Minnesota, 8-2
February 12, 2011	Srathmore Rockies @ Edmonton Chimos	Edmonton, 3-0
February 13, 2011	Strathmore Rockies @ Edmonton chimos	Edmonton 3-2
February 18, 2011	Manitoba Maple Leafs @ Strathmore Rockies	GAME CANCELLED
February 18, 2011	Minnesota Whitecaps @ Edmonton Chimos	Edmonton 3-2
February 19, 2011	Manitoba Maple Leafs @ Strathmore Rockies	GAME CANCELLED
February 19, 2011	Minnesota Whitecaps @ Edmonton Chimos	Minnesota 2-1
February 20, 2011	Manitoba Maple Leafs @ Strathmore Rockies	GAME CANCELLED
February 20, 2011	Minnesota Whitecaps @ Edmonton Chimos	Minnesota 2-1
February 25, 2011	Strathmore Rockies @ Manitoba Maple Leafs	GAME CANCELLED
February 26, 2011	Strathmore Rockies @ Manitoba Maple Leafs	GAME CANCELLED
February 27, 2011	Strathmore Rockies @ Manitoba Maple Leafs	GAME CANCELLED
March 12, 2011	Edmonton Chimos @ Strathmore Rockies	Edmonton 3-0
March 13, 2011	Edmonton Chimos @ Strathmore Rockies	Edmonton 4-3

== Final standings ==
Note: GP = Games played, W = Wins, L = Losses, T = Ties, OTL = Overtime losses, GF = Goals for, GA = Goals against, Pts = Points.

(on March 1, 2011)

WWHL
No.	Team	GP	W	L	T	OTL	GF	GA	Pts
1	Minnesota Whitecaps	18	17	0	0	1	120	43	35
2	Edmonton Chimos	17	11	5	0	1	56	41	23
3	Manitoba Maple Leafs	12	1	11	0	0	31	80	2
4	Strathmore Rockies	11	0	10	0	1	21	64	1

== Scoring Leaders ==
(on March 1, 2011)

	Player/Team	GP	Goal	Assist	Pts	Pen
1	Allie Thunstrom, Minnesota Whitecaps	17	28	18	46	6
2	Gigi Marvin, Minnesota Whitecaps	17	27	14	41	8
3	Meaghan Pezon, Minnesota Whitecaps	18	10	14	24	6
4	Jenny Potter, Minnesota Whitecaps	12	8	13	21	6
5	Winny Brodt, Minnesota Whitecaps	18	7	14	21	10
6	Chelsea Purcell, Edmonton Chimos	17	9	11	20	6
7	Sammy Nixon, Minnesota Whitecaps	12	8	12	20	8
8	Amy Stech, Minnesota Whitecaps	18	7	11	18	6

== Goaling Leaders ==
(on March 1, 2011)

	Player/Team	GP	W	L	SO	GAA
1	Kristen Sugiyama, Edmonton Chimos	9	6	3	1	2.07
2	Megan Van Beusekom, Minnesota Whitecaps	7	5	1	2	2.12
3	Keely Brown, Edmonton Chimos	7	4	3	0	2.23
4	Kim Hanlon Minnesota Whitecaps	6	5	0	0	2.52
5	Sanya Sandahl Minnesota Whitecaps	8	7	0	0	2.61

== Playoffs ==
The Clarkson Cup Championship 2011 is scheduled for 24-25-26-27 March. The four competing teams include three from the Canadian Women's Hockey League and the champion team of the Western Women's Hockey League: Minnesota Whitecaps.

Date	Time	Teams	Final score	Attendance
March 24	12:00 noon	Toronto vs Brampton	Toronto 3-2	100
March 24	6:00 pm	Minnesota vs Montreal	Montreal 5-1	240
March 25	12:00 noon	Minnesota vs Toronto	Toronto 6-0	300
March 25	7:00 pm	Brampton vs Montreal	Montreal 7-4	1,000
March 26	11:00 am	Minnesota vs Brampton	Brampton 7-2	500
March 26	3:00 pm	Toronto vs Montreal	Montreal 2-1	1,000
March 27	1:00 pm	Championship Final game	Montreal 5-0	2,300

Playoff records	Wins	Losses
Montreal	4	0
Toronto	2	2
Brampton	1	2
Minnesota	0	3

=== Awards and honors ===
Award	Winner
Top goaltender in the tournament	
Player of the Game, Winning team, Clarkson Cup Final	Dominique Thibault
Player of the Game, Losing team, Clarkson Cup Final	Jennifer Botterill
Tournament Most Valuable Player	Sarah Vaillancourt
Top forward in the tournament	
Top defender in the tournament	
