= 2007–08 WWHL season =

The 2007–08 WWHL season was the fourth season of the Western Women's Hockey League. The Calgary Oval X-Treme defeated the Minnesota Whitecaps to claim the WWHL Champions cup.

== Final standings ==
Note: GP = Games played, W = Wins, L = Losses, T = Ties, GF = Goals for, GA = Goals against, Pts = Points.

No.	Team	GP	W	T	L	GF	GA	Pts
1.	Calgary Oval X-Treme	24	24	0	0	162	27	48
2.	Minnesota Whitecaps	24	15	1	8	70	50	33
3.	Strathmore Rockies	24	11	1	12	58	97	23
4.	Edmonton Chimos	24	9	0	15	74	78	22
5.	British Columbia Breakers	24	0	0	24	23	135	2

The Chinese national women's team played 11 exhibition games ( 1 win and 10 defeats) against WWHL Teams.

== Playoffs ==
- Final round: Calgary Oval X-Treme vs. Minnesota Whitecaps

Calgary Oval X-Treme win the WWHL Champions cup.

== Scoring Leaders ==
	Player/Team	GP	Goal	Assist	Pts	Pen
1	Hayley Wickenheiser, Calgary Oval X-Treme	19	19	30	49	20
2	Gina Kingsbury, Calgary Oval X-Treme	23	20	25	45	8
3	Meagan Walton, Calgary Oval X-Treme	23	22	22	44	12
4	Kelly Bechard, Calgary Oval X-Treme	23	12	30	42	32
5	Rebecca Russell, Calgary Oval X-Treme	21	17	24	41	14
6	Jenny Potter, Minnesota Whitecaps	20	8	26	34	14
7	Danielle Bourgeois, Edmonton Chimos	24	12	18	30	20
8	Colleen Sostorics, Calgary Oval X-Treme	19	9	17	26	8

== Goalie Leaders ==
	Player/Team	GP	W	SO	GAA
1	Lyndsay Baird, Calgary Oval X-Treme	6	4	0	0.67
2	Amanda Tapp, Calgary Oval X-Treme	13	11	0	1.45
3	Yao Shi, Calgary Oval X-Treme	2	2	0	2.00
4	Shari Vogt, Minnesota Whitecaps	7	3	2	2.04
5	Megan Van Beusekom, Minnesota Whitecaps	8	6	2	2.20

== See also ==
- Western Women's Hockey League
