= 2008–09 WWHL season =

== Final standings ==
Note: GP = Games played, W = Wins, L = Losses, T = Ties, GF = Goals for, GA = Goals against, Pts = Points.

WWHL Division
No.	Team	GP	W	L	T	GF	GA	Pts
1	Calgary Oval X-Treme	23	20	2	1	143	34	42
2	Minnesota Whitecaps	22	18	3	1	181	44	38
3	Edmonton Chimos	24	14	10	0	82	79	28
4	Strathmore Rockies	23	6	16	1	36	126	13
5	British Columbia Breakers	24	0	22	2	17	76	2

== Playoffs ==
semi-finals

- March 7, 2009: Calgary 9, Strathmore 0
- March 7, 2009: Minnesota 4, Edmonton 0

=== Final WWHL Championship ===
- March 8, 2009: Minnesota 2, Calgary 0

Minnesota Whitecaps won the Championship of the WWHL

== Clarkson Cup 2009 ==
A Canadian Women's Hockey League's team Montreal Stars won the Clarkson Cup by defeating 3-1 the Minnesota Whitecaps

== Scoring Leaders ==
	Player/Team	GP	Goal	Assist	Pts	Pen
1	Gina Kingsbury, Calgary Oval X-Treme	23	25	31	56	10
2	Cherie Piper, Calgary Oval X-Treme	23	16	24	40	20
2	Carla Macleod, Calgary Oval X-Treme	23	13	27	40	20
3	Jenny Potter, Minnesota Whitecaps	19	16	21	37	16
4	Tessa Bonhomme, Calgary Oval X-Treme	23	13	23	36	20
5	Rebecca Russel, Calgary Oval X-Treme	24	14	21	35	12
6	Karen McLaughlin, Calgary Oval X-Treme	23	22	11	33	22
7	Kristen Hagg, Edmonton Chimos	25	14	18	32	16

== Goalie Leaders ==
	Player/Team	GP	W	SO	GAA
1	Kendall Newell, Calgary Oval X-Treme	10	9	3	1.60
2	Amanda Tapp, Calgary Oval X-Treme	10	8	1	1.79
3	Sanya Sandahl, Minnesota Whitecaps	9	5	0	1.98
4	Megan Van Beusekom, Minnesota Whitecaps	6	3	0	2.61
5	Manon Rheaume, Minnesota Whitecaps	2	2	0	3.00
