= Karen Thatcher =

American ice hockey player

- Born: February 29, 1984 (age 42) Bryn Mawr, PA, USA
- Height: 5 ft 8 in (173 cm)
- Position: Forward
- Hockey East WWHL CWHL team: Providence; British Columbia Breakers (2006-07); Minnesota Whitecaps (2008-09); Vaughan Flames (2007-08); Boston Blades (2010-13)
- National team: United States
- Playing career: 2002–2013
Medal record
Representing United States
Women's ice hockey
Olympic Games
Silver medal – second place	2010 Vancouver	Tournament
IIHF World Women's Championships
Gold medal – first place	2008 China	Tournament
Gold medal – first place	2009 Finland	Tournament
Women's 4 Nations Cup
Gold medal – first place	2011 Sweden	Tournament

Karen Elizabeth Thatcher (born February 29, 1984) is an American ice hockey forward. She was named to the United States women's ice hockey team for the 2010 Winter Olympics.

== Personal life ==
Thatcher was born in Bryn Mawr, Pennsylvania, but grew up in Douglas, Massachusetts. She graduated from Providence College in 2006 with a bachelor's degree in biology.

She was employed as a physical therapy student assistant at Dodd Rehabilitation Hospital at The Ohio State University Wexner Medical Center. She is now a Doctor of Physical Therapy at The Ohio State University Wexner Medical Center in sports medicine and rehabilitation, and working to complete her PhD.

In 2017, she received the "Mary McMillan Scholarship" Award from the American Physical Therapy Association, an honor give to individuals with "superior scholastic ability and measurable potential for future contributions to both the physical therapy profession and the American Physical Therapy Association." She also received the 2017 "Outstanding Student Award" from the Sports Section of the American Physical Therapy Association.

== Playing career ==
=== NCAA ===
Thatcher transferred to the Providence Friars after spending the 2002–03 season with the Brown Bears. In her sophomore year, she tied for fourth on the Friars in points (she had 10 goals and 27 points). She was honored as Hockey East's sportsmanship award winner. In her junior year, Thatcher scored 58 points (25 goals, 33 assists). She was co-Hockey East Player of the Year (shared the honor with New Hampshire Wildcats player Stephanie Jones).

As a senior, Thatcher was the Friars scoring leader, and was a Top 10 candidate for the Patty Kazmaier Award. In addition, she was the team captain. For her NCAA career, she accumulated 167 points in 132 games played. During her time with the Friars, the team won Hockey East tournament championships in both 2004 and 2005. Thatcher is 10th on the Friars' all-time scoring list.

=== WWHL and CWHL ===
She played for the British Columbia Breakers of the Western Women's Hockey League (WWHL) in 2006–07. Statistically, she led the team and ranked 10th in the league with 36 points (19-17) in 26 games. The following year, she joined the Vaughan Flames of the Canadian Women's Hockey League and helped the team to the inaugural CWHL championship. In 2008–09, she returned to the WWHL and helped lead the Minnesota Whitecaps to the league championship.

=== Team USA ===
- Two-time member of the U.S. Women's National Team for the International Ice Hockey Federation World Women's Championship (gold-2008-09). Named to the team in 2007, but missed the tournament due to injury
- Three-time member of the U.S. Women's Select Team for the Four Nations Cup (1st-2008, 2nd-2006-07)

Member of the U.S. Women's Select Team in 2008-09

- Three-time member of the U.S. Women's Under-22 Select Team for the Under-22 Series with Canada (2002–04)
- Five-time USA Hockey Women's National Festival participant (2003–04, 2007–09)

== Career stats ==
Season	Games	Goals	Assists	Points	PPG	SHG
2003-2004	33	10	17	27	3	1
2004-2005	32	25	33	58	13	1
2005-2006	35	18	29	47	7	4
Career	100	43	79	132	23	6

== Coaching career ==
On August 20, 2010, the Providence Friars women's ice hockey program announced that Thatcher had been named as an assistant coach for the Friars.

== Professional career ==
Thatcher works in sports medicine physical therapy for Ohio State University.

== Awards and honors ==
- Providence Hockey East All-Decade Team
- Most Valuable Player, Pool B, 2007 Esso Canadian Women's Nationals
- Top Forward, Pool B, 2007 Esso Canadian Women's Nationals
- Top 10 Finalist, 2006 Patty Kazmaier Award
- 2004 HOCKEY EAST Sportsmanship Award
- HOCKEY EAST Player of the Week Honors two times (11/8/04), and (1/31/05)
- Named to the 2002-03 ECAC All-Rookie Team
- Boston Bruins John Carlton Award in 2002
- Hockey East 10th Anniversary Team selection
