= Saskatchewan Prairie Ice =

Canadian women's ice hockey team (2003–2007)

The Saskatchewan Prairie Ice were a professional women's ice hockey team in the Western Women's Hockey League (WWHL). The team played its home games in Lumsden, Saskatchewan, Canada.

== History ==
After playing exhibition games throughout Saskatchewan in 2003-04, the Prairie Ice joined the Calgary Oval X-Treme, Minnesota Whitecaps, Edmonton Chimos and British Columbia Breakers in forming the Western Women's Hockey League in 2004-2005. In 2006, the two leagues were reunited under the NWHL banner. However, this was short lived as the NWHL and WWHL could not reach an agreement upon a playoff schedule. As a result, the merger was not consummated. With the collapse of the NWHL in the summer of 2007, the Western Women's Hockey League was once again a completely independent league. The Prairie Ice have suspended operations in summer 2007.

== Season-by-season ==
- See also: 2004–05 WWHL season
- See also: 2005–06 WWHL season
- See also: 2006–07 WWHL season

Year by year
Year	GP	W	L	T	GF	GA	Pts
2004–05	21	1	19	1	24	132	3
2005–06	24	4	16	4	49	114	12
2006–07	24	0	22	2	31	164	2

Note: GP = Games played, W = Wins, L = Losses, T = Ties, GF = Goals for, GA = Goals against, Pts = Points,

== Season standings ==
Year	Regular season	Playoffs
2004-05	5th	no participation to playoff
2005-06	4th	eliminated in first round
2006-07	5th	no participation to playoff

== Last roster 2006–07 ==
Goalies
Number	Nat.	Player	Former Team	Hometown
31	(Canada)	Hearn Sara		
20	(Canada)	Rachel hubert		
1	(Canada)	Robin Petkau	University of Saskatchewan Huskies	Pense, Saskatchewan

Defense
Number	Nat.	Player	Former Team	Hometown
23	(Canada)	Jessica Pennel	Saskatchewan Prairie Ice	
18	(Canada)	Landa Hain	Saskatchewan Prairie Ice	Regina, Saskatchewan
12	(Canada)	Jamie Lee Magnusson	Saskatchewan Prairie Ice	Regina, Saskatchewan
10	(Canada)	Erin Balfour	Saskatchewan Prairie Ice	
9	(Canada)	Trina Rissling	University of Regina Cougars	Regina, Saskatchewan
7	(Canada)	Stephanie Reinhart	Saskatchewan Prairie Ice	Regina, Saskatchewan
5	(Canada)	Robyn Presley		
4	(Canada)	Emily Henry	Canadian Women's National Team from 1994-2002	Lumsden, Saskatchewan
2	(Canada)	Sally Sutter	Saskatchewan Prairie Ice	

Forwards
Number	Nat.	Player	Former Team	Hometown
25	(Canada)	Kylie Rossler	Saskatchewan Prairie Ice	
24	(Canada)	Melanie Kell		Edmonton, Alberta
22	(Canada)	Dru Black	University of Regina Cougars	Craven, Saskatchewan
21	(Canada)	Gina Campbell	Saskatchewan Prairie Ice	
19	(Canada)	Jocelyn Kratchmer	University of Regina Cougars	Watrous, Saskatchewan
17	(Canada)	Julie Foster	Saskatchewan Prairie Ice	Regina, Saskatchewan
16	(Canada)	Beckie Bailey	University of Saskatchewan Huskies	Kyle, Saskatchewan
15	(Canada)	Courtney MacDougall		
14	(Canada)	Christina Badgley		
11	(Canada)	Erin Tady		
6	(Canada)	Brandy West-McMaster	University of Regina Cougars	Langbank, Saskatchewan
3	(Canada)	Janet Babchishin	Regina Sharks	Sturgis, Saskatchewan

== Coaching staff 2006–07 ==
- General Manager:
- Head Coach:
- Assistant Coach:

== Notable former players ==
- Emily Henry

== See also ==
- Western Women's Hockey League (WWHL)
- List of ice hockey teams in Saskatchewan
