= 2005–06 WWHL season =

Hockey season

The 2005–06 WWHL season was the second season of the Western Women's Hockey League. The Calgary Oval X-Treme enjoyed an undefeated season and claimed the WWHL Champions cup.

== Final standings ==
Note: GP = Games played, W = Wins, L = Losses, T = Ties, GF = Goals for, GA = Goals against, Pts = Points.

No.	Team	GP	W	L	T	GF	GA	Pts
1	Calgary Oval X-Treme	24	22	0	2	126	43	46
2	Edmonton Chimos	24	16	5	3	102	47	35
3	Minnesota Whitecaps	24	11	8	5	79	65	27
4	Saskatchewan Prairie Ice	24	4	16	4	49	114	12
5	British Columbia Breakers	24	0	21	3	40	127	3

== Playoffs ==
- Final round: Calgary Oval X-Treme vs. Minnesota Whitecaps

Calgary Oval X-Treme win the WWHL Champions cup

Playoffs Stats
No.	Team	GP	W	L	T	GF	GA
1	Calgary Oval X-Treme	3	3	0	0	16	5
2	Minnesota Whitecaps	3	2	1	0	10	6
3	Edmonton Chimos	2	0	2	0	3	10
4	Saskatchewan Prairie Ice	2	0	2	0	3	11

== Scoring Leaders ==
	Player/Team	GP	Goal	Assist	Pts	Pen
1	Rebecca Russell, Calgary Oval X-Treme	25	20	32	52	8
2	Meagan Walton, Calgary Oval X-Treme	27	21	25	46	2
3	Tricia Dunn-Luoma, Minnesota Whitecaps	27	23	18	41	34
4	Heather Hogan, Calgary Oval X-Treme	25	22	17	39	16
5	Danielle Bourgeois, Edmonton Chimos	22	27	11	38	4
6	Kaley Hall, Calgary oval X-Treme	24	15	18	33	42
6	Chantale Larocque, Calgary Oval X-Treme	26	12	21	33	24
6	Tristan Desmet, Calgary Oval X-Treme	27	15	18	33	24

== Goalie Leaders ==
	Player/Team	GP	W	SO	GAA
1	Amanda Tapp, Calgary Oval X-Treme	13	12	3	1.28
2	Lara Smart, Edmonton Chimos	9	5	2	1.64
3	Sanya Sandahl, Minnesota Whitecaps	7	1	0	1.79
4	Megan Van Beusekom, Minnesota Whitecaps	11	5	2	1.94
5	Ali Houston, Edmonton Chimos	8	4	1	2.33
