= Molly Engstrom =

American ice hockey player and coach

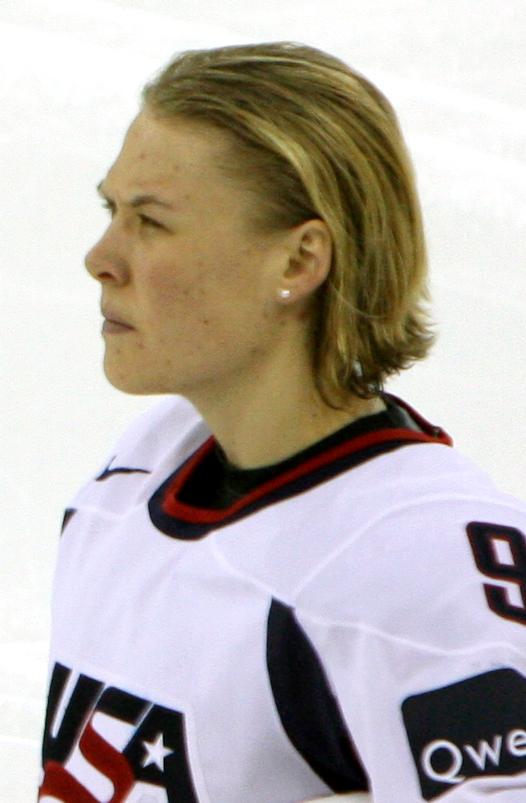
- Engstrom with Team USA in 2010
- Born: March 1, 1983 (age 43) Siren, Wisconsin, United States
- Height: 5 ft 9 in (175 cm)
- Weight: 178 lb (81 kg; 12 st 10 lb)
- Position: Defense
- Shot: Right
- Played for: Djurgårdens IF; Connecticut Whale; Brampton Thunder; Minnesota Whitecaps; Wisconsin Badgers
- Current NCAA coach: Maine Black Bears
- Coached for: St. Cloud State Huskies
- National team: United States
- Playing career: 2001–2018
- Coaching career: 2018–present
Medal record
Olympic Games
Silver medal – second place	2010 Vancouver	Team
Bronze medal – third place	2006 Turin	Team
World Championship
Gold medal – first place	2005 Sweden	Team
Gold medal – first place	2008 China	Team
Gold medal – first place	2009 Finland	Team
Gold medal – first place	2011 Switzerland	Team
Silver medal – second place	2004 Canada	Team
Silver medal – second place	2007 Canada	Team
4 Nations Cup
Gold medal – first place	2011 Sweden	Team
Silver medal – second place	2010 Canada	Team

Molly Marie Engstrom (born March 1, 1983) is an American former ice hockey player and the current head coach of the Maine Black Bears women's ice hockey program in the Hockey East (HEA) conference of the NCAA Division I. During her playing career, she played with Djurgårdens IF in the Swedish Women's Hockey League (SDHL), the Connecticut Whale in the National Women's Hockey League (NWHL; rebranded as PHF in 2021), the Brampton Thunder in the Canadian Women's Hockey League (CWHL), and the Minnesota Whitecaps in the Western Women's Hockey League (WWHL).

As a member of the United States women's national ice hockey team, she won a bronze medal in the women's ice hockey tournament at the 2006 Winter Olympics in Turin and a silver medal in the women's ice hockey tournament at the 2010 Winter Olympics in Vancouver. She played for the women's team at Culver Girls Academy.

== Playing career ==
In high school, she participated in track and field and golf. In her sophomore year, Engstrom won the Wisconsin state discus title.

=== Wisconsin Badgers ===
In her senior year at Wisconsin, Engstrom served as one of two undergraduate assistant coaches. The other coach was future Olympian Carla Macleod. Engstrom and Macleod assisted coach Mark Johnson with analysis of game footage.

=== Brampton Thunder ===
- March 23, 2008: Engstrom was part of the Brampton Thunder team that won the first Championship of the CWHL. Molly Engstrom scored the game-winning goal as the Thunder beat the Mississauga Chiefs by a score of 4-3 in overtime.
- February 14, 2009: Engstrom took part in the Calgary Oval X-Treme's game against the U.S. Selects in the final game of the EnCana sponsored 4 game Battle of the Border women's hockey tournament. Her teammates included Carla McLeod, Colleen Sostorics, Chanda Gunn. The U.S. Selects won the game by a score of 3 to 2 but the Oval X-Treme won the series 3 games to 1.
- March 2010: Engstrom competed with the Brampton Thunder in the finals of the 2010 Clarkson Cup.

=== USA Hockey ===
Engstrom was a member of the 2006 US Olympic Hockey Team that won a bronze medal. In addition, Engstrom was a five-time member of the U.S. Women's National Team for the International Ice Hockey Federation World Women's Championship. At the Worlds, Engstrom captured the Gold in 2005, 2008 and 09, and the silver in 2004 and 2007. She was named the IIHF World Championships top defenseman in 2007. She was also a two-time member of the U.S. Women's Under-22 Select Team in 2003 and 2004. Engstrom was also a seven-time USA Hockey Women's National Festival participant (2002–05, 2007–09).

=== Connecticut Whale ===
On August 18, 2015, it was announced that Engstrom had signed a contract with the Connecticut Whale of the professional Premier Hockey Federation for the 2015-16 season.

==== Career stats ====
Season	Games played	Goals	Assists	Points	PPG
2001-02	35	6	9	15	4
2002-03	33	4	10	14	3
2003-04	34	5	19	24	2
2004-05	38	13	19	26	11

== Awards and honors ==
- Wisconsin Hockey Hall of Fame, 2024 Inductee
- Vancouver 2010 Olympics, Media All-Star Team
- Vancouver 2010 Olympics, Directorate Award, Best Defenseman
- Clarkson Cup Top Defender, 2010
- CWHL Central All-Stars, 2007–08
- CWHL All-Rookie Team, 2007–08
- 2004-05 All USCHO.com Second Team
- 2004 Badger Award

=== Molly Engstrom Award ===
The Molly Engstrom Award was introduced in 2011. The criteria for the award are for the "Overall Defensive Player of the Year". The award is presented by Wisconsin Prep Hockey to a female ice hockey player from Wisconsin prep school and coaches are asked to nominate a player from their respective team. A list of winners includes:

Year	Winner	Team
2011	Josie Johnson	Sun Prairie Co-op Cougars
2012	Paige Johnson	Marshfield Tigers
2013	Paige Johnson	Marshfield Tigers
2014	Ellie Woodman	Rock County Fury
2015	Jacyn Reeves	Onalaska Hilltoppers
2016	Maddie Rowe	St. Croix Valley Fusion
2017	Anna Wilgren	Hudson Raiders
2018	Anna Wilgren	Hudson Raiders
2019	Charlotte Akervik	Eau Clare Area Stars
2020	Challis Prohaska	Central Wisconsin Storm
2021	Maddux Federici	Central Wisconsin Storm
2022	Kendall Sundby	St. Croix Valley Fusion
2023	Kendall Sundby	St. Croix Valley Fusion
2024	Kendall Sundby	St. Croix Valley Fusion
2025	Ava Rode	Central Wisconsin Storm Fusion
2026	Ava McDonald	Bay Area Ice Bears

Preceded by Angela Ruggiero (2004, 2005)	IIHF World Women's Championships Best Defender; 2007	Succeeded by Angela Ruggiero (2008)
