= 2006–07 WWHL season =

The 2006–07 WWHL season was the third season of the Western Women's Hockey League. The Calgary Oval X-Treme enjoyed an undefeated season and claimed the WWHL Champions cup.

== Exhibition ==
- Oct 23, 2006: Calgary Flames Alumni took on the Calgary Oval X-Treme at the Max Bell Centre in the Calgary Super Drug Mart Champions' Cup, winning by a 9-8 score in an over time shoot out. More than 1,000 fans were in attendance and helped raise $7,500 for the Goal On Sight charity and the Olympic Oval Female Hockey Program. Claude Vilgrain clinched the Flames Alumni victory in the shoot out, scoring the only goal against X-Treme goalie Ali Boe.

== Final standings ==
Note: GP = Games played, W = Wins, L = Losses, T = Ties, GF = Goals for, GA = Goals against, Pts = Points.

| No. | Team | GP | W | L | T | GF | GA | Pts |
|---|---|---|---|---|---|---|---|---|
| 1 | Calgary Oval X-Treme | 24 | 23 | 0 | 1 | 172 | 24 | 46 |
| 2 | Edmonton Chimos | 24 | 15 | 8 | 1 | 88 | 63 | 31 |
| 3 | Minnesota Whitecaps | 24 | 13 | 9 | 1 | 74 | 64 | 28 |
| 4 | British Columbia Breakers | 24 | 8 | 15 | 0 | 71 | 121 | 17 |
| 5 | Saskatchewan Prairie Ice | 24 | 0 | 22 | 2 | 31 | 164 | 2 |

== Playoffs ==
- Final round: Calgary Oval X-Treme vs. Minnesota Whitecaps

Calgary Oval X-Treme win the WWHL Champions cup.

Playoff stats
| No. | Team | GP | W | L | T | GF | GA |
|---|---|---|---|---|---|---|---|
| 1 | Calgary Oval X-Treme | 3 | 3 | 0 | 0 | 28 | 2 |
| 2 | Minnesota Whitecaps | 3 | 2 | 1 | 0 | 12 | 9 |
| 3 | Edmonton Chimos | 2 | 0 | 2 | 0 | 2 | 14 |
| 4 | British Columbia Breakers | 2 | 0 | 2 | 0 | 1 | 18 |

== Scoring Leaders ==
| | Player/Team | GP | Goal | Assist | Pts | Pen |
|---|---|---|---|---|---|---|
| 1 | Hayley Wickenheiser, Calgary Oval X-Treme | 19 | 34 | 33 | 67 | 20 |
| 2 | Rebecca Russell, Calgary Oval X-Treme | 31 | 25 | 40 | 65 | 4 |
| 3 | Kaley Hall, Calgary Oval X-Treme | 28 | 17 | 31 | 49 | 58 |
| 4 | Danielle Goyette, Calgary Oval X-Treme | 15 | 22 | 23 | 45 | 20 |
| 5 | Danielle Bourgeois, Edmonton Chimos | 25 | 20 | 24 | 44 | 20 |
| 6 | Gina Kingsbury, Calgary Oval X-Treme | 25 | 16 | 28 | 44 | 12 |
| 7 | Meagan Walton, Calgary Oval X-Treme | 28 | 9 | 30 | 39 | 12 |
| 8 | Colleen Sostorics, Calgary Oval X-Treme | 25 | 16 | 22 | 38 | 33 |

== Goalie Leaders ==
| | Player/Team | GP | W | SO | GAA |
|---|---|---|---|---|---|
| 1 | Amanda Tapp, Calgary Oval X-Treme | 14 | 0 | 8 | 0.53 |
| 2 | Megan Van Beusekom, Minnesota Whitecaps | 8 | 3 | 1 | 1.98 |
| 3 | Lyndsay Baird, Calgary Oval X-Treme | 3 | 3 | 0 | 2.00 |
| 4 | Ali Boe, Calgary Oval X-Treme | 14 | 11 | 8 | 2.26 |
| 5 | Sanya Sandahl, Minnesota Whitecaps | 9 | 6 | 2 | 2.44 |
