= Manitoba Maple Leafs =

- City: Winnipeg, Manitoba
- League: Western Women's Hockey League
- Founded: 2010
- Folded: 2014
- Home arena: MTS Iceplex
- Colours: Black, Red and White

The Manitoba Maple Leafs were a professional women's ice hockey team in the Western Women's Hockey League (WWHL). The team played its home games at the MTS Iceplex in Winnipeg, Canada.

== History ==
The team joined the WWHL on June 5, 2010. Its team president was Bryon Stephen. The franchise was in partnership with the Winnipeg Métis Federation to provide an opportunity to participate in ice hockey for players from all ethnic backgrounds.

In preparation for its first season, a selection camp took place in September, 2010 for the beginning by the season on October 29 in front of Minnesota Whitecaps. The opening match at home was November 5 and the first victory of the history of Maple Leafs took place on Sunday, November 7 which ended with a 5-2 score over the Edmonton Chimos. However, victories were rare for Maple Leafs in this first season. The team ended its season in the third rank in the classification of the WWHL and did not qualify for the qualifying rounds.

The Canadian Women's Hockey League announced on April 19, 2011, that it would merge with the Western Women's Hockey League for the 2011-12 season. The merger would feature one team based in Edmonton and Calgary and would be combination of the former WWHL franchises the Edmonton Chimos and Strathmore Rockies. The team played their games in various locations around Alberta.

The Manitoba Maple Leafs and the Minnesota Whitecaps continued to be active teams after the end of the WWHL and played a number of exhibition games. While the Whitecaps remained active and eventually joined the new National Women's Hockey League in 2018, the Maple Leafs appear to have ceased functioning after 2014.

== Season-by-season ==
-
| Year | GP | W | L | T | OTL | GF | GA | Pts |
|---|---|---|---|---|---|---|---|---|
| 2010-11 | 12 | 1 | 11 | 0 | 0 | 31 | 80 | 2 |

Note: GP = Games played, W = Wins, L = Losses, T = Ties, OTL = Overtime losses, GF = Goals for, GA = Goals against, Pts = Points.

== Season standing ==
| Year | Regular season | Playoffs |
|---|---|---|
| 2010–11 | 3rd | no participation to playoff |

== See also ==
- Western Women's Hockey League (WWHL)
- Minnesota Whitecaps
- Canadian Women's Hockey League (CWHL)
