= WWHL =

WWHL may refer to:

- WWHL-LD, a low-power television station (channel 31, virtual 32) licensed to serve Nashville, Tennessee, United States
- Western Women's Hockey League
- Watch What Happens Live with Andy Cohen, an American late-night talk show
