= Ronda Curtin Engelhardt =

American ice hockey player (born 1980)

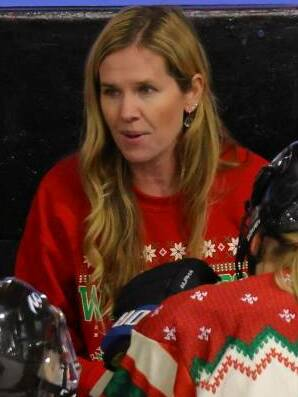
- Curtin in 2022
- Born: November 2, 1980 (age 44) Roseville, Minnesota
- Height: 5 ft 10 in (178 cm)
- Weight: 145 lb (66 kg; 10 st 5 lb)
- Position: Forward
- WCHA team: Minnesota Golden Gophers
- Playing career: 1999–2003

Ronda Curtin Engelhardt (born November 2, 1980) is an American ice hockey player and coach. She currently serves as an amateur scout for the Nashville Predators. She was previously head coach of the Minnesota Whitecaps, leading the team to an Isobel Cup victory in 2019. During her playing career with the University of Minnesota Golden Gophers ice hockey team, she was a finalist for the Patty Kazmaier Award, and was selected to the Western Collegiate Hockey Association women's team of the decade in the 2000s.

== Career ==
Prior to playing for Minnesota, Curtin was a member of the United States Select Team roster that competed at the 1999 Christmas Cup tournament in Fussen, Germany, on December 27–30, 1999. Some of her teammates included future Olympians Julie Chu, Natalie Darwitz, Jenny Schmidgall and Krissy Wendell.

Curtin played both defense and forward as the University of Minnesota Golden Gophers won the 2001–02 Western Collegiate Hockey Association regular-season title for the second consecutive season. Curtin's season included 45 points (11 goals, 34 assists) in 34 games, making her the first defender in WCHA history to lead the conference in regular-season scoring. She led the WCHA in assists (34) and power-play points (21). During the season, Curtin garnered WCHA Player of the Week honors three times and became the first women's ice hockey player in Minnesota to win the award three times in a single season. For her efforts, she was named the 2002 WCHA Player of the Year, the WCHA Defensive Player of the year, a WCHA First Team selection and the WCHA Tournament Most Valuable Player. For the 2002–03 season, she was named team captain.

After finishing her college playing career, she joined the University of St. Thomas hockey staff as an assistant coach for four seasons and earned her Master's degree. She later coached the girls' team at Breck School.

In 2018, she was hired as a co-coach of the professional Minnesota Whitecaps in the National Women's Hockey League for their inaugural 2018–19 season in the league. She was a co-head coach for her first two seasons, leading the Whitecaps to an Isobel Cup win in 2019 and two Isobel Cup finals losses in 2021 and 2023. Following the 2023 season, she left the Whitecaps and joined the Nashville Predators as an amateur scout.

== Personal ==
In addition to her athletic achievements, she also participates in various community service projects. Her younger sister, Renee, was a forward at Minnesota. She married professional hockey player Brett Engelhardt and has three children.

== Career statistics ==
			Regular season					Playoffs
Season	Team	League	GP	G	A	Pts	PIM	GP	G	A	Pts	PIM
1999–2000	University of Minnesota	WCHA	39	26	27	53	6	—	—	—	—	—
2000–01	University of Minnesota	WCHA	34	12	17	29	6	—	—	—	—	—
2001–02	University of Minnesota	WCHA	38	13	35	48	16	—	—	—	—	—
2002–03	University of Minnesota	WCHA	36	9	28	37	10	—	—	—	—	—
NCAA totals			147	60	107	167	38	—	—	—	—	—

Note: Pos = Position; GP = Games played; G = Goals; A = Assists; Pts = Points; PIM = Penalty minutes; +/- = Plus/minus; PPG = Power-play goals; SHG = Short-handed goals; GWG = Game-winning goals

== Awards and honors ==
=== High school ===
- 1995–96 First Team All-State
- 1996–97 First Team All-State
- 1997–98 First Team All-State
- 1998–99 First Team All-State
- Number 2 on the Top Career Scorers listing with 470 pts (behind her younger sister Renee's 544 points)
- All State-Tournament pick four times.
- 1997 Player of the Year
- 1999 Minnesota Ms. Hockey Award winner
- 2023 Inductee into the Roseville Raiders Hall of Fame

=== Golden Gopher awards ===
- 2002 GWH Award
- 2002 Most Valuable Player Award
- 2002, 2003 Highest GPA Award
- 2003 Team Captain
- 2002 Kathleen C. and Robert B. Ridder Scholarship
- 2002, 2003 First Team All-Americans
- 2002 Patty Kazmaier Award Finalist
- 2002, 2003 First-Team All-WCHA
- 2002, 2003 WCHA Defensive Player of the Year
- 2002 WCHA Player of the Year
- 2002 WCHA All-Tournament Team
- 2001, 2002, 2003 WCHA All-Academic Team & Academic All-Big Ten
- WCHA Player of the Week: 2001–02 season, (Dec 17, Feb 11, March 4)
- WCHA Rookie of the Week: 1999–2000 season (Oct 18, Nov 15, Feb. 15)
- WCHA 10th Anniversary Team
