= Minnesota Whitecaps =

Former women's professional ice hockey team in Richfield, Minnesota

- City: Richfield, Minnesota
- League: Premier Hockey Federation (2018–2023); Western Women's Hockey League (2004–2011)
- Founded: 2004
- Folded: 2023
- Home arena: Richfield Ice Arena
- Colors: Black, white, blue, silver
- Owners: NLTT Ventures; Top Tier Sports; (Neil Leibman, governor)
- General manager: Chi-Yin Tse
- Head coach: Ronda Engelhardt
- Captain: Sydney Brodt
- Affiliates: Minnesota Wild (NHL)

Championships
- Clarkson Cup: 1 (2010)
- Isobel Cup: 1 (2019)

The Minnesota Whitecaps were a professional ice hockey team in the Premier Hockey Federation (PHF). They played in Richfield, Minnesota, part of the Minneapolis–Saint Paul metropolitan area, at the Richfield Ice Arena. Established in 2004, the Whitecaps were originally part of the Western Women's Hockey League (WWHL) from 2004 to 2011.

Following the dissolution of the WWHL after the 2010–11 season, the team became independent. While independent, the Whitecaps' schedule consisted mostly of games against women's college hockey squads. The team also played some exhibition games against teams in the new National Women's Hockey League during the league's inaugural 2015–16 season, but it was not an official member of that league. On May 15, 2018, the NWHL announced that they had acquired the Whitecaps and that the team would officially join for the 2018–19 season.

The Whitecaps are the only team to have won both a Clarkson Cup and an Isobel Cup championship. They won the Clarkson Cup in 2010 as a member of the WWHL and the Isobel Cup in 2019, their inaugural season in the NWHL.

The NWHL rebranded as the PHF in 2021. In 2023, the PHF was purchased and ultimately shut down to make way for the creation of a unified women's professional league, the Professional Women's Hockey League (PWHL). The Whitecaps were folded in the process. In August 2023, it was announced that Minnesota was awarded one of the six charter PWHL franchises. PWHL Minnesota debuted in 2024.

The Whitecaps also operated junior teams at the under-17 (U17) and under-19 (U19) levels.

== History ==
=== WWHL era (2004–2011) ===
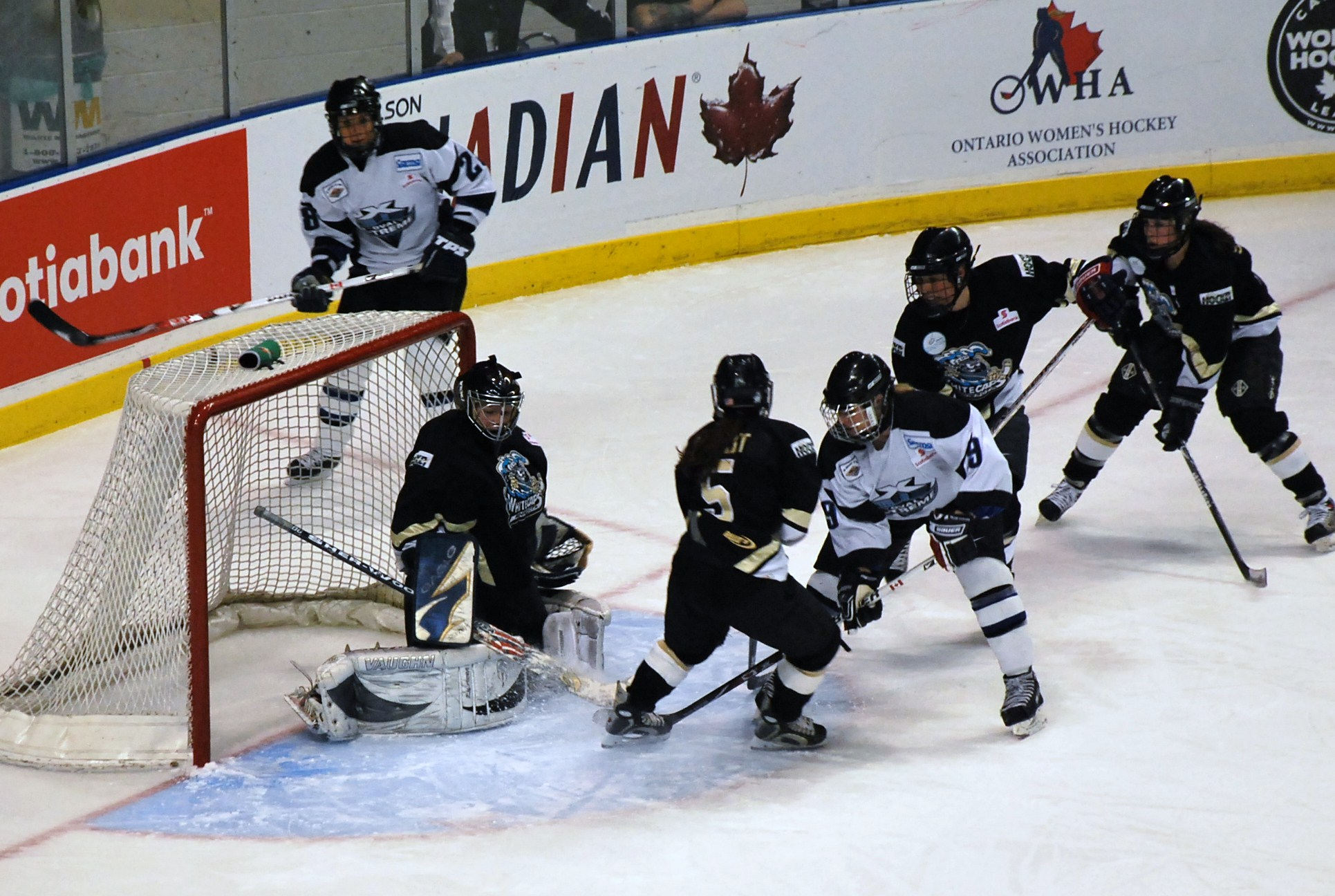
The Whitecaps playing the Calgary Oval X-Treme during their time in the WWHL.

The Whitecaps were formed by two Minneapolis–Saint Paul area hockey dads, Jack Brodt and Dwayne Schmidgall in 2004. They wanted to give their daughters – Winny Brodt-Brown, former Minnesota Golden Gophers player and U.S. national team member, and Jenny Schmidgall-Potter, a four-time U.S. Olympic medalist – a place to play after college. The Whitecaps were part of the Western Women's Hockey League (WWHL) from the fall of 2004 until the summer of 2006. In July 2006, it was announced that team, along with other WWHL teams, would be joining the National Women's Hockey League (NWHL) for the 2006–07 season. However, this was short lived as the NWHL and WWHL could not reach an agreement upon a playoff schedule. As a result, the merger was not consummated. With the collapse of the NWHL in the summer of 2007, the Western Women's Hockey League was a completely independent league.

The Whitecaps took three regular season championships in the WWHL, 2008–09, 2009–10 and 2010–11, qualifying to participate in the Clarkson Cup tournament for the Canadian women's ice hockey championships against teams from the Canadian Women's Hockey League.

During the qualifying WWHL rounds 2008–09, the Whitecaps won the semifinal match 4–0 over the Edmonton Chimos. The next day, the Whitecaps defeated the Calgary Oval X-Treme by the score of 2–0 in the championship match in Calgary. During the 2009 Clarkson Cup, the Whitecaps upset both the Brampton Thunder and the Calgary Oval X-Treme. The Whitecaps then played in the final match of the tournament but lost by a score of 3–1 to the Montreal Stars, who would take home the Clarkson Cup.

The following season, 2009–10, the Whitecaps took the WWHL Championship. The first match of the WWHL qualifying round took place on February 5, 2010, at the Minnesota Pagel Ice Arena and the Whitecaps defeated the Strathmore Rockies by a score of 6–3. During the second match on February 6 at Victory Memorial Ice Arena, the Whitecaps beat Strathmore by a score of 4–1. The third match on February 7 at the Graham Arena, Strathmore won 4–3 over the Whitecaps. The Whitecaps 2–1 record advanced the team to the 2010 Clarkson Cup tournament in Richmond Hill, Ontario. Whitecaps beat the Brampton Thunder 4–0 in final game and won their only Clarkson Cup.

The Whitecaps were defeated in all three of their round-robin matches in the 2011 Clarkson Cup.

=== Independent era (2011–2018) ===
The Canadian Women's Hockey League (CWHL) announced on April 19, 2011, that it would merge with the Western Women's Hockey League for the 2011–12 season. The merger was to feature one team based in Edmonton and Calgary that would combine the former WWHL Edmonton Chimos and Strathmore Rockies, called Team Alberta. However, the CWHL decided against adding the Whitecaps and Manitoba Maple Leafs. The business manager of the Whitecaps, Kristie Minkoff, accused the CWHL of collusion against the participation of the Whitecaps in the 2012 Clarkson Cup and of making the team pay a $200,000 expansion fee to the CWHL in order to play. The two teams attempted to continue operating the league, but lost several board members and were unable to put together a 2011–12 season. The two teams played a number of exhibition games while the league looked to expand with new teams. The WWHL never reorganized and effectively ceased operations. While independent, the Whitecaps' schedule consisted mostly of games against women's college ice hockey squads.

While independent, the Whitecaps did not have a home rink and reached out to Minnesota youth hockey programs that could either afford to buy ice time at rinks suitable for Whitecaps home games or had ice time donated to them. In exchange, the Whitecaps used part of that ice time to put on clinics for the youth players, who received free tickets to the games and whose hockey associations received 100 percent of the proceeds from ticket sales. Some programs raised more than $1,500 in a single night from the arrangement.

During the 2015–16 season, a new National Women's Hockey League (NWHL) began play in the Northeastern United States, and was the first women's hockey league to pay its players. The Whitecaps played four exhibition games against the NWHL teams, but were not an official member of that league. For the 2016–17 season, the Whitecaps scheduled no games against CWHL or NWHL teams, but had several games scheduled against NCAA teams and Shattuck-St. Mary's School.

In February 2018, Kate Schipper and Sadie Lundquist were invited to represent the Whitecaps at the NWHL All-Star Game and Skills Challenge, which were held at TRIA Rink in Saint Paul, Minnesota.

=== NWHL/PHF era (2018–2023) ===
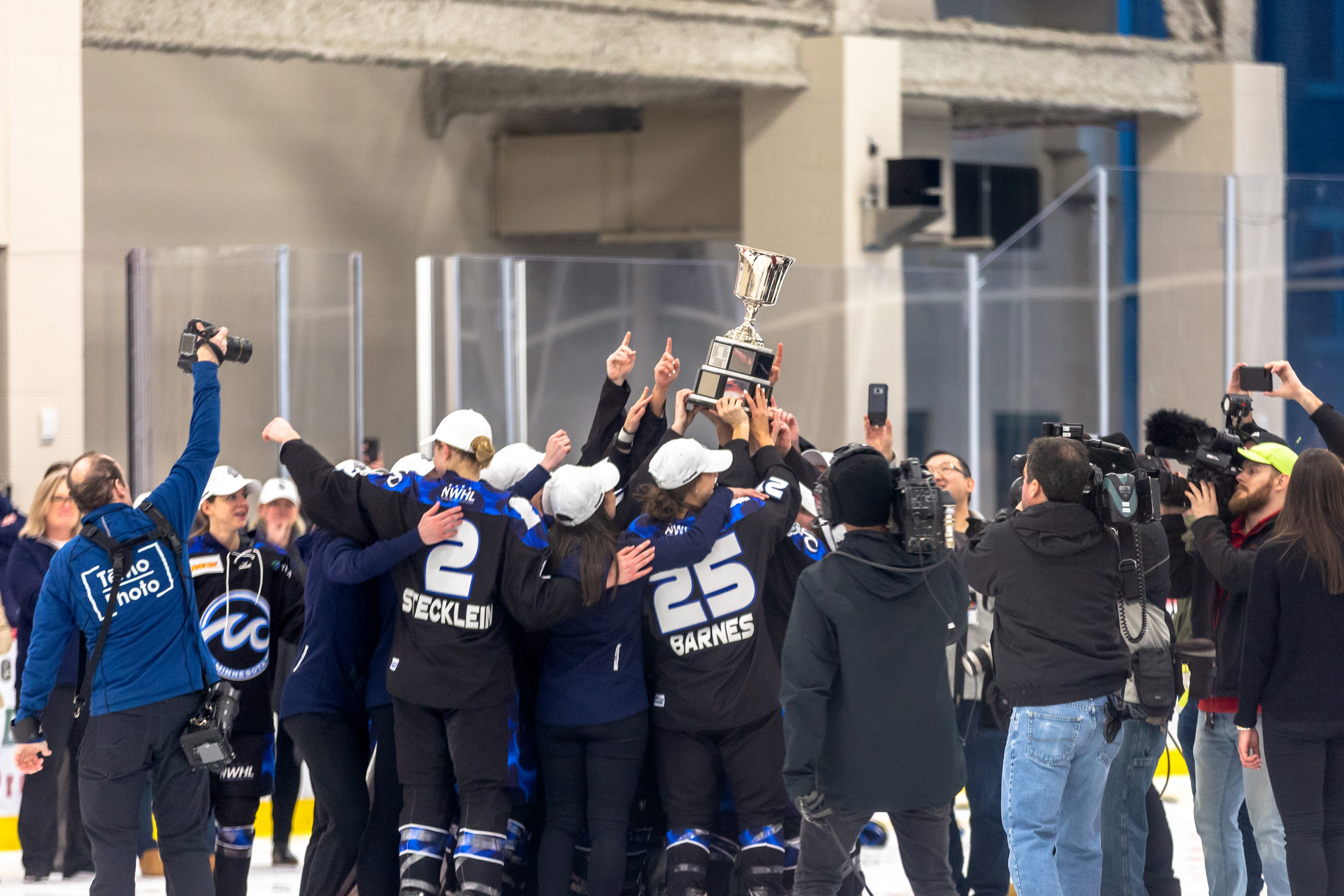
The Minnesota Whitecaps team holds up the Isobel Cup, celebrating the NWHL playoff championship in 2019.

On May 15, 2018, the NWHL announced that it had an agreement in principle to acquire ownership of the Whitecaps, and the team joined the NWHL as an expansion team for the 2018–19 season. They then made an agreement with the Minnesota Wild to use TRIA Rink, the Wild's practice facility, as the site for Whitecaps home games. It was reported that the Whitecaps had hired 2018 Olympic gold medal-winning coach Robb Stauber and his wife Shivaun Stauber as coaches, sharing the head coaching responsibilities, but the parties never signed a contract. Whitecaps' founder and general manager Jack Brodt instead returned to the coaching position he held prior to joining the NWHL, and the team hired former University of Minnesota player Ronda Curtin Engelhardt as co-head coach.

On August 21, the Whitecaps unveiled their new logo. During their first NWHL season, league commissioner Dani Rylan stated that the Whitecaps were the first team in the league to turn a profit by having a league-leading 500 season tickets sold, significant merchandise sales, and all home games sold out through eight games. On March 3, 2019, the Whitecaps finished their inaugural NWHL season as the first seed and regular season champions. On March 17, 2019, the Whitecaps beat the Buffalo Beauts 2–1 in overtime to win the Isobel Cup league playoff championship. The Whitecaps also ended the season with the highest average attendance by selling out all ten home games including the playoffs.

After the season ended, Brodt stated that, though the NWHL had reached an agreement in principle to purchase the team, the agreement was never signed and the Whitecaps remained privately owned at that time. By 2020, the Whitecaps were one of four teams listed as owned by W Hockey Partners, the ownership group that managed league-owned teams in the NWHL. On June 28, 2021, the league announced the sale of the Buffalo Beauts and the Whitecaps to joint partners NLTT Ventures, LLC, led by Andy Scurto, and Top Tier Sports, led by Neil Leibman. Leibman was named the team's governor.

In September 2021, the NWHL was restructured and rebranded as the Premier Hockey Federation (PHF).

After the 2022–23 season, the PHF was purchased and wound down as part of the foundation of the Professional Women's Hockey League, the first unified women's professional league in North America. The Whitecaps thus ceased operations after five seasons in the league.

== Season-by-season results ==
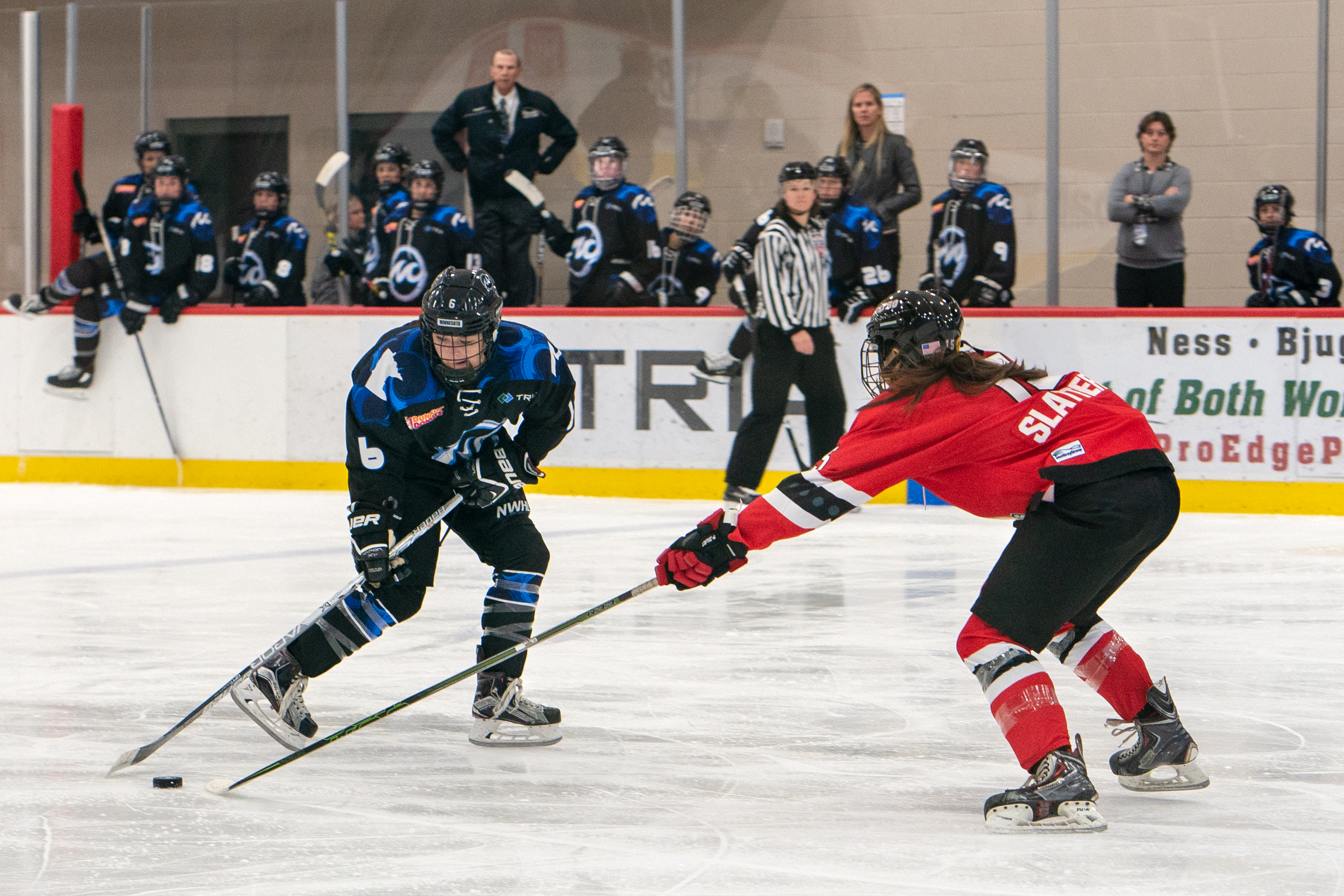
Whitecaps Kate Schipper (6) and Riveters Lexi Slattery (15) in the 2018–19 season opening weekend at Tria Rink.

= Indicates first-place finish

= Indicates championship

Note: GP = Games played, W = Wins, L = Losses, T = Ties, GF = Goals for, GA = Goals against, Pts = Points

Season	GP	W	L	OTL	GF	GA	Finish	Playoffs
2004–05	12	8	3	1	34	23	2nd	Lost in First Round
2005–06	24	11	8	5	79	65	3rd	Lost Final
2006–07	24	13	9	1	74	64	3rd	Lost Final
2007–08	24	15	6	1	70	50	2nd	Lost Final
2008–09	22	18	3	1	181	44	2nd	WWHL Champions; Lost Clarkson Cup
2009–10	12	10	2	0	44	24	1st	WWHL Champions; Won Clarkson Cup
2010–11	18	17	1	0	120	43	1st	WWHL Champions; Lost Clarkson Cup
WWHL Totals	136	92	32	9	602	313		
Season	GP	W	L	OTL	GF	GA	Finish	Playoffs
2018–19	16	12	4	0	53	34	1st	Won Isobel Cup championship game, 2–1 (OT) vs. Buffalo Beauts
2019–20	24	17	5	2	106	52	2nd	Qualified for Isobel Cup championship game vs. Boston Pride; Championship game cancelled due to COVID-19 pandemic
2020–21	4	3	1	0	12	10	2nd	Lost Isobel Cup championship game, 3–4 vs. Boston Pride
2021–22	20	6	13	1	52	64	5th	Lost Isobel Cup semifinal game, 2–4 vs. Connecticut Whale
2022–23	24	10	11	3	58	66	4th	Lost Isobel Cup final game, 3–4 vs. Toronto Six
NWHL/PHF Totals	88	48	34	6	281	226		

=== Season events ===
==== 2008–09 ====
- January 16: The Whitecaps participated in Hockey Day Minnesota. The team played the USA Selects Team.
- March 8: The Whitecaps defeated the Calgary Oval X-Treme on March 8 in the WWHL Championship game shutting out Calgary by a score of 2–0. The Minnesota Whitecaps also won the semi-final game on March 7 against the Edmonton Chimos by a score of 4–0.
- March 21: The Whitecaps participated in the inaugural Clarkson Cup. The final game pitted the Montreal Stars, the top team from the Canadian Women's Hockey League, against the Minnesota Whitecaps, the top team from the WWHL. Montreal won the Cup by a score of 3–1. Sanya Sandahl was selected as Minnesota's player of the game.

==== 2009–10 ====
- November 16: Chisago Lakes was host to the first scrimmage of the season between the Whitecaps and the USA National team.
- December 21: Jenny Potter, Angela Ruggiero, Julie Chu, Natalie Darwitz, Caitlin Cahow, Molly Engstrom, Lisa Chesson, Jinelle Zaugg-Siergiej and Karen Thatcher all former Minnesota Whitecaps will be playing in the 2010 Vancouver Olympic Games on February 12–28.
- On February 8, 2010, the Whitecaps clinched the WWHL Championship. The first game of the series on February 5, was held at Minnetonka's Pagel Ice Arena hosted by Minnetonka Youth Hockey Association. The Whitecaps beat Strathmore by a score of 6–3. Game two of the series was hosted by the NOVAS Girls High School Hockey team on Saturday, February 6, at Victory Memorial Ice Arena.
- March 28: The Whitecaps defeated the Brampton Thunder 4–0 in Richmond Hill, Ontario, Canada to win the Clarkson Cup.

==== 2010–11 ====
Exhibition

Date	Opponent	Location	Score	Goal scorers
October 1, 2010	Minnesota Duluth	Duluth, MN	3–4 (Shootout)	Jenny Potter, Iya Gavrilova, Saara Tuominen
October 8, 2010	Minnesota Golden Gophers	Ridder Arena	2–3	Allie Thunstrom, Saara Tuominen
October 22, 2010	Bemidji State Beavers	Eveleth, MN	3–1	Allie Thunstrom, Iya Gavrilova, Jenny Potter
October 23, 2010	Bemidji State Beavers	Eveleth, MN	1–5	Jessica Koizumi

2011 Clarkson Cup

Date	Match	Winner
March 24, 2011	Minnesota – Montreal	Montreal Stars 5–1
March 25, 2011	Minnesota – Toronto	Toronto Aeros 6–0
March 26, 2011	Minnesota – Brampton	Brampton Thunder 7–2

=== Independent schedules ===
From the 2011–12 season through the 2017–18 season, the Whitecaps played only exhibition games against CWHL, NCAA, high school and NWHL teams.

==== Exhibition games ====
Date	Opponent	Location	Score
September 25, 2015	University of Minnesota	Ridder Arena	4–5
September 26, 2015	St. Cloud State University	Ridder Arena	3–4
October 3, 2015	Connecticut Whale	North Branford, CT	4–8
October 4, 2015	New York Riveters	Newark, NJ	5–2
December 5, 2015	Shattuck-St. Mary's School	Ridder Arena	2–3
December 6, 2015	Shattuck-St. Mary's School	Faribault, MN	5–4
December 12, 2015	Boston Pride	Ridder Arena	1–5
December 13, 2015	Shattuck-St. Mary's School	Ridder Arena	5–4
January 6, 2016	University of Minnesota	Ridder Arena	5–4
January 9, 2016	University of North Dakota	Grand Forks, ND	6–1
January 10, 2016	University of North Dakota	Grand Forks, ND	1–0
February 13, 2016	Shattuck-St. Mary's School	Faribault, MN	2–3

== Players and personnel ==
=== 2022–23 roster ===
As of December 3, 2022

No.	Nat	Player	Pos	S/G	Age	Acquired	Birthplace
3	(United States)	Jonna Albers (A)	F	R	32	2018	Elk River, Minnesota
5	(United States)	Sidney Morin (A)	D	R	31	2022	Minnetonka, Minnesota
6	(United States)	Brooke Madsen	F	R	28	2022	Eagan, Minnesota
7	(United States)	Emma Stauber	D	L	33	2017	Duluth, Minnesota
8	(United States)	Natalie Snodgrass	F	L	27	2022	Eagan, Minnesota
9	(United States)	Sydney Baldwin (A)	D	L	30	2019	Minnetonka, Minnesota
10	(Sweden)	Ronja Mogren	F	R	25	2022	Sundsvall, Sweden
11	(United States)	Brittyn Fleming	F	L	27	2022	Oregon, Wisconsin
13	(Canada)	Ashleigh Brykaliuk	F	L	31	2021	Brandon, Manitoba
14	(United States)	Sydney Brodt (C)	F	R	28	2022	North Oaks, Minnesota
16	(United States)	Taylor Wente (C)	F	R	27	2022	Plymouth, Minnesota
18	(United States)	Stephanie Anderson	F	L	33	2019	St. Paul, Minnesota
19	(United States)	Anna Klein	F	R	28	2022	Edina, Minnesota
21	(United States)	Liz Schepers	F	L	27	2022	Mound, Minnesota
24	(Canada)	Olivia Knowles	D	R	27	2022	Campbell River, British Columbia
27	(United States)	Patti Marshall	D	R	28	2020	Thief River Falls, Minnesota
28	(United States)	Amanda Boulier	D	R	33	2022	Watertown, Connecticut
29	(Canada)	Amanda Leveille	G	L	32	2018	Kingston, Ontario
33	(United States)	Maddie Rowe	D	R	28	2020	River Falls, Wisconsin
35	(United States)	Jenna Brenneman	G	L	28	2021	Eagan, Minnesota
39	(Canada)	Chantal Burke	G	L	27	2022	Saskatoon, Saskatchewan
41	(Czech Republic)	Denisa Krizova	F	L	32	2022	Horní Cerekev, Czechia

Coaching staff and team personnel

- Head coach: Ronda Curtin Engelhardt
- Assistant coach: Amber Hegland
- Goaltending coach: Brennan Poderzay
- Athletic trainers: Amy Hamilton & Christina Neville
- Conditioning coach: Noah Draper
- Equipment manager: Clark Woldum

=== Notable former players ===
Player	Position	Hometown	Years	Notes
Caitlin Cahow	Defense	New Haven, Connecticut	2008–2009	Team USA for 2006 and 2010 Winter Olympics; 2007, 2008, 2009, and 2011 IIHF Women's World Championship
Lisa Chesson	Defense	Plainfield, Illinois	2008–2009	Team USA for 2010 Olympics; 2009, 2012, and 2013 IIHF Women's World Championship
Julie Chu	Forward	Bridgeport, Connecticut	2007–2009	Team USA for 2002, 2006, 2010, and 2014 Winter Olympics; IIHF team from 2001 to 2013.
Natalie Darwitz	Forward	Eagan, Minnesota	2006–2008	Team USA for 2002, 2006, and 2010 Winter Olympics; IIHF team from 1999 to 2009.
Molly Engstrom	Defense	Siren, Wisconsin	2008–2009	Team USA for 2006 and 2010 Winter Olympics; IIHF team from 2004 to 2011
Manon Rheaume	Goaltender	Beauport, Québec	2007–2009	Team Canada for 1998 Winter Olympics; IIHF team in 1992 and 1994. Played for several men's professional minor league teams.
Angela Ruggiero	Defense	Simi Valley, California	2006–2010	Team USA for 1998, 2002, 2006, and 2010 Winter Olympics; IIHF team from 1997 to 2011. Played for a men's professional minor league team, the Tulsa Oilers in 2005.
Karen Thatcher	Forward	Bryn Mawr, Pennsylvania	2008–2009	Team USA for 2010 Winter Olympics; IIHF team for 2008 and 2009
Jinelle Zaugg-Siergiej	Forward	Eagle River, Wisconsin	2008–2009	Team USA for 2010 Winter Olympics; IIHF team in 2007

== Awards and honors ==
- Natalie Darwitz, Western Women's Hockey League Most Valuable Player (2006–07)
- 2008 Breaking Barriers Award: Presented at National Girls and Women in Sports Day in St. Paul
- 2009 Clarkson Cup Top role model: Julie Chu
- 2009 Clarkson Cup Top defense: Caitlin Cahow
- In March 2010, the Whitecaps became the first American team to win the Clarkson Cup
- 2010 Clarkson Cup Most Valuable Player:Julie Chu
- 2010 Clarkson Cup Final Player of the Game: Brooke White-Lancette

=== PHF ===
- Jonna Curtis, 2019 Newcomer of the Year
- Amanda Leveille, 2021 Goaltender of the Year
- Amanda Leveille, 2021 Foundation Award (Whitecaps' representative)
- Denisa Krizova, 2023 PHF Foundation Award
