= 2010 Clarkson Cup =

2010 ice hockey championship series

| | 1 | Total |
|---|---|---|
| Brampton Thunder | 0 | 0 |
| Minnesota Whitecaps | 4 | 4 |
- Location(s): Richmond Hill, Ontario
- Dates: March 28, 2010
- Hall of Famers: Thunder: Jayna Hefford (2018)

The 2010 Clarkson Cup was contested at the Elgin Barrow Arena in Richmond Hill, Ontario, Canada. The four competing teams included the Brampton Thunder, Minnesota Whitecaps, Mississauga Chiefs, and Montreal Stars.

== Qualification ==
The Brampton Thunder defeated the Burlington Barracudas in the Canadian Women's Hockey League wild card game to qualify for the Clarkson Cup tournament. The Thunder proceeded to eliminate the defending champion Montreal Stars in the semifinals.

== Brampton Thunder roster ==
| Number | Player | Position | School |
| 4 | Elysia Desmier | Forward | Guelph |
| 9 | Jennifer Kirk | Forward | Sheridan College |
| 10 | Gillian Apps | Forward | Dartmouth |
| 12 | Lori Dupuis | Forward | University of Toronto |
| 14 | Amanda Nonis | Forward | Manhattanville College |
| 15 | Kristi Alcorn | Forward | Quinnipiac |
| 16 | Jayna Hefford | Forward | Toronto |
| 24 | Nicole Tritter | Forward | Connecticut |
| 21 | Katie Dowdall | Forward | Toronto |
| 83 | Amber Welch | Forward | Keswick High School |
| 2 | Belinda Odell | Defense | Priceville High School |
| 7 | Brooke Beazer | Defense/Forward | Clarkson |
| 5 | Molly Engstrom | Defense | Wisconsin |
| 11 | Bobbi Jo Slusar | Defense | York |
| 23 | Meredith Ostrander | Defense | Brown |
| 34 | Ashley Pendleton | Defense | Mercyhurst |
| 1 | Mandy Cronin | Goalie | Maine |
| 29 | Laura Hosier | Goalie | Mercyhurst |

== Minnesota Whitecaps roster ==
| Number | Player | Position | School |
| 2 | Sam Nixon | Forward | St. Cloud State |
| 10 | Brooke White | Forward | Northeastern |
| 15 | Andrea Nichols | Forward | Minnesota |
| 16 | Jenny Potter | Forward | Minnesota Duluth |
| 17 | Julie Chu | Forward | Harvard |
| 19 | Erin Keys | Forward | Ohio State |
| 22 | Megan McCarthy | Forward | St. Cloud State |
| 27 | Maggie Fisher | Forward | Minnesota State–Mankato |
| 3 | Chelsey Brodt-Rosenthal | Defense | Minnesota |
| 5 | Winny Brodt | Defense | Minnesota |
| 21 | Allie Sanchez | Defense | Minnesota |
| 39 | Megan Van Beusekom | Goaltender | Princeton |

== Tournament ==
=== Semifinals ===
| Date | Time | Participants | Score |
|---|---|---|---|
| March 27, 2009 | 12:00 | Brampton Thunder vs. Montreal Stars | Brampton, 3-2 |
| March 27, 2009 | 16:00 | Minnesota Whitecaps vs. Mississauga Chiefs | Minnesota, 3-0 |

=== Finals ===
| Date | Time | Participants | Score |
|---|---|---|---|
| March 28, 2009 | 15:00 | Brampton Thunder vs. Minnesota Whitecaps | Minnesota, 4-0 |

== Championship game ==
The Minnesota Whitecaps were the only team from the Western Women's Hockey League to compete in the tournament. It was the second consecutive year that the Whitecaps had made the final. The team came to the tournament with only 11 players and two goalies. Goalie Megan Van Beusekom-Sweerin had a shutout in a 4-0 win for the Whitecaps.

=== Scoring summary ===
Chelsey Brodt-Rosenthal snapped a wrist shot past Thunder netminder Laura Hosier. During the first period, the Whitecaps hit the post twice. In the second period, Jenny Potter scored on a breakaway. The assist was credited to Erin Keys. In the second period, the Thunder were not able to get on the scoreboard. Molly Engstrom fired a slap shot past Van Beusekom-Sweerin, but the shot hit the post. In the third period, Maggie Fisher scored on a pass from Megan McCarthy. Andrea Fisher intercepted a pass from the Thunder. She passed to Brooke White-Lancette and scored the fourth goal on Hosier.

== Awards and honours ==
- Megan Van Beusekom-Sweerin: Top goaltender in the tournament
- Brooke White, Player of the Game, Minnesota, Clarkson Cup Final
- Bobbi Jo Slusar, Player of the Game, Brampton, Clarkson Cup Final
- Julie Chu, Minnesota, Tournament MVP.
- Lori Dupuis, Brampton, Top forward in the tournament
- Molly Engstrom, Brampton, Top defender in the tournament

== Olympians in the Clarkson Cup ==
- The following players also played for their respective countries in ice hockey at the 2010 Winter Olympics.

| Player | Team | Nationality |
| Gillian Apps | Brampton Thunder | Canada |
| Julie Chu | Minnesota Whitecaps | United States |
| Molly Engstrom | Brampton Thunder | United States |
| Jayna Hefford | Brampton Thunder | Canada |
| Caroline Ouellette | Montreal Stars | Canada |
| Jenny Potter | Minnesota Whitecaps | United States |
| Marie-Philip Poulin | Montreal Stars | Canada |

== See also ==
- Clarkson Cup
- Minnesota Whitecaps
