= 2009–10 WWHL season =

== Final standings ==
Note: GP = Games played, W = Wins, L = Losses, T = Ties, GF = Goals for, GA = Goals against, Pts = Points.

WWHL Division
No.	Team	GP	W	L	T	GF	GA	Pts
1	Minnesota Whitecaps	12	10	2	0	44	24	20
2	Edmonton Chimos	18	7	7	4	40	48	18
3	Strathmore Rockies	18	7	10	1	43	55	15

The Calgary Oval X-Treme suspended his activities for the season 2009-10 but will spend the upcoming season (2010–2011) re-establishing a home arena and training returning Olympic team and newly recruited players.

Minnesota won the WWHL Championship.

== Clarkson Cup 2010 ==
- participants

March 3, 2010: Of note, the city council of Richmond Hill, Ontario donated $10,000 to the CWHL so that it could host the Clarkson Cup on March 27 at the Elgin Barrow Arena in Richmond Hill.

- Semifinals

Date	Time	Participants	Score
March 27, 2009	12:00 pm	Brampton Thunder vs. Montreal Stars	Brampton, 3-2
03/27/2009	16:00	Minnesota Whitecaps vs. Mississauga Chiefs	Minnesota, 3-0

- Finals

Date	Time	Participants	Score
March 28, 2009	15:00	Brampton Thunder vs. Minnesota Whitecaps	Minnesota, 4-0

Minnesota Whitecaps win the Clarkson Cup.

== Scoring leaders ==
	Player/Team	GP	Goal	Assist	Pts	Pen
1	Sam Nixon, Minnesota Whitecaps	11	9	7	16	14
2	Reagan Fischer, Strathmore Rockies	18	7	7	14	24
2	Kaley Herman, Strathmore Rockies	16	5	9	14	48
3	Erin Keys, Minnesota Whitecaps	11	8	5	13	18
4	Lindsay McAlpine, Edmonton Chimos	17	7	5	12	18
4	Mia Mucci, Edmonton Chimos	16	6	6	12	10
5	Tara Hammer, Strathmore Rockies	16	5	6	11	10
6	Lindsay Robinson, Edmonton Chimos	17	5	5	10	10

== Goalie leaders ==
	Player/Team	GP	W	SO	GAA
1	Megan Van Beusekom, Minnesota Whitecaps	12	10	2	1.80
2	Keely Brown, Edmonton Chimos	11	4	1	1.96
3	Kristen Young, Edmonton Chimos	2	1	0	2.88
4	Carli Clemis, Strathmore Rockies	5	3	0	2.95
5	Grace Gaska, Strathmore Rockies	3	1	0	3.02
