= TRIA Rink =

Ice hockey arena in Saint Paul, Minnesota

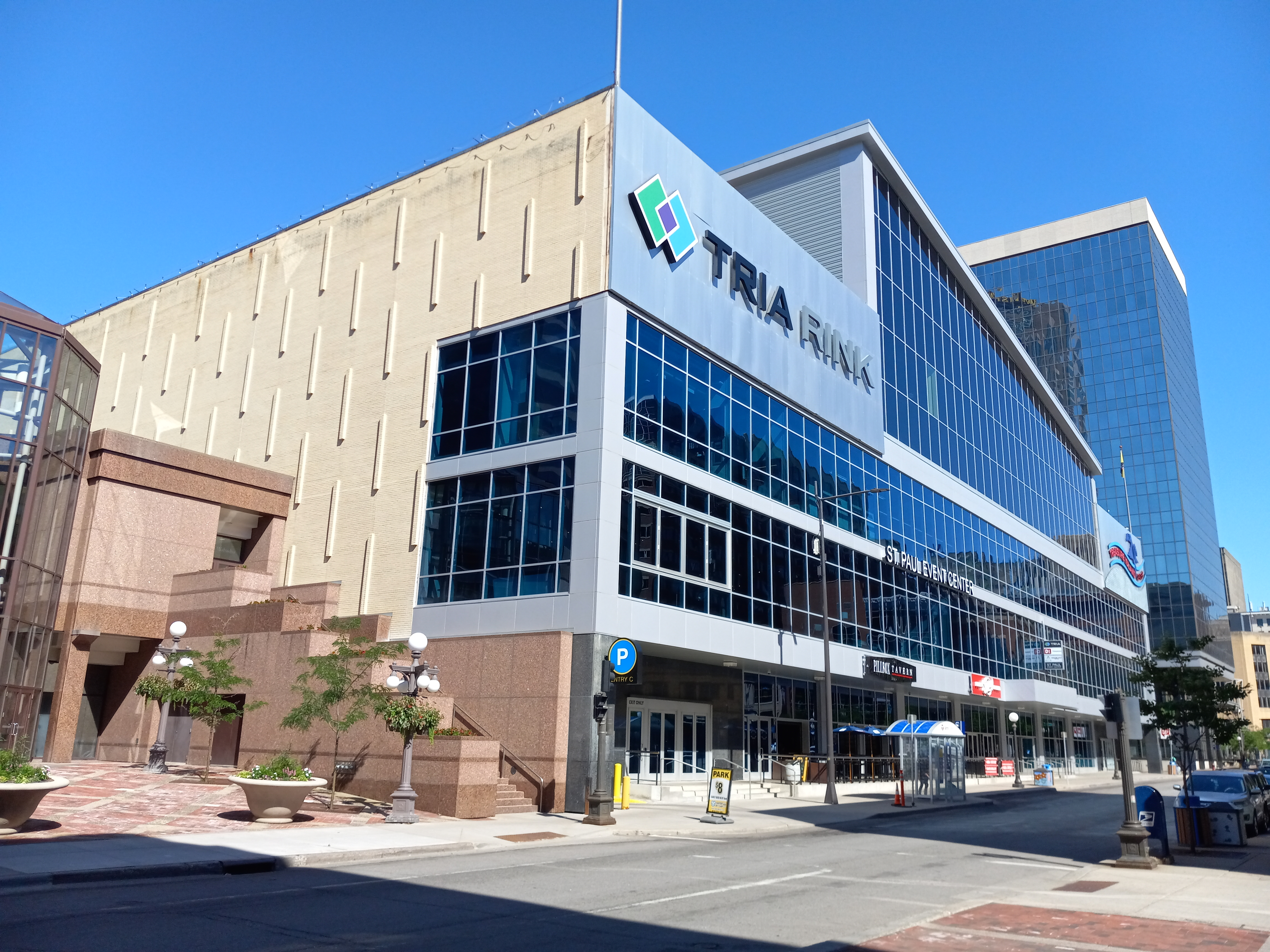

- Location within Minnesota Location within the United States
- Location: 400 Wabasha St. N Saint Paul, Minnesota
- Coordinates: 44°56′50.6″N 93°05′44.9″W
- Owner: City of Saint Paul, Minnesota
- Operator: Minnesota Wild
- Capacity: 1,200
- Surface: 200' x 85'
- Public transit: Metro Green Line (Central station)

Construction
- Groundbreaking: April 2017
- Opened: January 10, 2018

Tenants
- Minnesota Whitecaps (NWHL) (2018–2022); Hamline Pipers (MIAC) (2018–present); Minnesota Wild (practice facility)

Website
- Official website

TRIA Rink is an ice hockey arena and practice facility in Saint Paul, Minnesota. It is located on the fifth floor of Treasure Island Center, a former Macy’s department store in downtown St. Paul. The arena was constructed as part of a redevelopment effort by the Saint Paul Port Authority who is redeveloping the building. The arena is the practice facility of the Minnesota Wild of the National Hockey League and the former home arena of the Minnesota Whitecaps of the Premier Hockey Federation and Hamline University's hockey program.

== History ==
The building was originally constructed in 1963 as a Dayton's department store. In 2005, Dayton's was renamed Macy's. After the departure of Macy's from the building in 2013, the St. Paul Port Authority purchased the building and partnered with the Minneapolis-based Hempel Properties to convert the former department store into a six-level commercial destination and parking ramp. On December 22, 2016, the Minnesota Wild signed a lease for a rink and practice facility on the roof of the building. The Wild was the first tenant at the new development. In April 2017, the ground was broken on the rooftop arena that would serve as a practice facility for the Wild. In early 2017 it was announced that TRIA Orthopedic Center has acquired the naming rights to the rooftop arena.

TRIA rink opened on January 10, 2018.

The arena held the 3rd NWHL All-Star Game on February 11, 2018. Later it was announced that the Minnesota Whitecaps would enter the NWHL and that TRIA Rink would serve as the team's home. The arena later served as the venue for the 2019 Isobel Cup Final between the Whitecaps and the Buffalo Beauts. The game won by the Whitecaps.

== Layout ==
The rink is on the fifth floor of the building. Minnesota Wild officials have offices and training space in the basement of the building and use private elevators to get to the rink.
