= Clarkson Cup =

Canadian women's ice hockey trophy

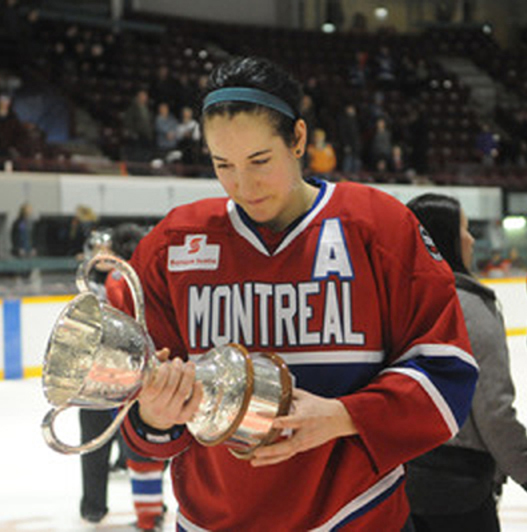
- Caroline Ouellette with the Cup in 2011
- Sport: Ice hockey
- Awarded for: Canadian women's hockey championship: National Canadian Women's Championship (2009–2011); CWHL champion (2012–2019)
- Local name: Coupe Clarkson (French)
- Country: Canada

History
- First award: 2006
- Editions: 12
- Final award: 2019
- First winner: Team Canada
- Most wins: Les Canadiennes de Montréal (4)
- Most recent: Calgary Inferno

The Clarkson Cup (French: La Coupe Clarkson) is an ice hockey trophy awarded to Canada's national women's champions. Commissioned by former Governor General Adrienne Clarkson, the trophy was first unveiled in July 2006 when Clarkson ceremoniously presented it to the Canadian national women's team. Owing to a rights dispute with the artists who designed the trophy, it was not officially awarded until 2009, when it became, as intended, the award for the top women's club team. From 2012 to 2019, it was exclusively awarded to the winner of the Canadian Women's Hockey League (CWHL). In Canada, it has been considered the women's equivalent of the Stanley Cup.

The Clarkson Cup has not been awarded since 2019, when the CWHL abruptly folded. Les Canadiennes de Montréal are the club with the most Clarkson Cup titles, with four, while the Calgary Inferno are the most recent title holders, winning the Cup in 2019.

== History ==
=== Origins and rights dispute (2006–09) ===
When the 2004–05 NHL season was cancelled due to a lockout, the Stanley Cup was not awarded for the first time since 1919, when the Stanley Cup Final was cancelled due an outbreak of Spanish flu. In February 2005, Adrienne Clarkson proposed that since the Stanley Cup was to be awarded to the best professional ice hockey team of the year, it should be awarded to the best women's hockey team because they were still playing. That idea was brought to Susan Fennell, Commissioner of the National Women's Hockey League (NWHL). Fennell suggested that the governor general consider lending her name to the women's hockey championship trophy, as Lord Stanley had done years before for the men's hockey championship, and Jeanne Sauvé had done for ringette's Jeanne Sauvé Memorial Cup. Clarkson later met with Fennell at Rideau Hall, where it was agreed that the women's hockey championship trophy would be named the Clarkson Cup. Clarkson commissioned Inuit artists to design the Cup.

Clarkson awarded the trophy to the Canadian national team in a ceremony on July 10, 2006, in honour of the team's 2006 Olympic title; but, the expectation was that Hockey Canada would take over the trophy and award it to the country's top club team, which at the time meant it would be awarded to the champion of the NWHL. However, the awarding of the Cup was delayed by the emergence of a rights dispute. The artists who decorated the trophy retained a degree of ownership rights over it, and a financial settlement was not reached until March 2009. The status of the Cup was further complicated when the NWHL folded in 2007. The Western Women's Hockey League (WWHL) survived the NWHL's dissolution, and the Canadian Women's Hockey League (CWHL) was launched in 2007 to replace the NWHL. When the Clarkson Cup finally became available in 2009, it was awarded to the winners of a tournament featuring the top teams from the WWHL and the CWHL.

=== National championship (2009–19) ===
==== Inter-league title (2009–11) ====
The Clarkson Cup was first awarded officially in March 2009. The CWHL champion Montreal Stars defeated the Minnesota Whitecaps from the WWHL in the Clarkson Cup final by a score of 3–1. Adrienne Clarkson was on hand to present the trophy, and stated: "This is about encouraging excellence in women's hockey... It's a wonderful legacy to have—the Clarkson Cup for women's hockey. I'm absolutely thrilled about it." The Stars' victory also created a Stanley Cup parallel as the first Stanley Cup championship was also won by a team from Montreal.

In 2010, the Whitecaps avenged their 2009 loss and became what would prove to be the only WWHL team to win the Clarkson Cup with a 4–0 win over the Brampton Thunder in the final. The Stars returned to the top in 2011, defeating Toronto in the title match.

==== CWHL championship (2012–19) ====
The WWHL disbanded after the 2010–11 season, with an Albertan team joining the CWHL. This made the Clarkson Cup the exclusive championship trophy of the CWHL. Montreal was the first team to win the Cup under this format, with the Stars securing a third title in four years and becoming the first and to date only team to win consecutive titles. Montreal would win the Cup just once more, in 2017, after the team had re-branded to become Les Canadiennes de Montréal.

The Boston Blades became the first American CWHL team to win the Clarkson Cup in 2013, defeating Montreal in the final, and secured a second title in 2015. The Blades' run was interrupted by a 1–0 overtime loss in the 2014 final against Toronto. In 2016, ten years after unveiling the Cup, Clarkson stated that she was "really pleased with what has become of the Cup", but she joined women's players in lamenting the lack of salaries for top-level female players. That year, the Clarkson Cup final was played in an NHL arena for the first time; the Calgary Inferno secured their first title with a win at Ottawa's Canadian Tire Centre.

In a move that helped enable the CWHL to start paying player stipends, the league expanded to include two teams based in Shenzhen, China, in 2017; one of those teams, Kunlun Red Star, fell just short of becoming the first non-North American team to win the Clarkson Cup, losing the 2018 final in overtime to the Markham Thunder by a score of 2–1. In 2019, the Inferno won their second Clarkson Cup. This would prove to be the last Clarkson Cup victory in the CWHL; after the 2018–19 season, the league abruptly announced that it was ceasing operations. The announcement left the Clarkson Cup in limbo, with Clarkson insisting that the Cup "will always be there to be the symbol and the trophy for the best women's hockey". She further stated that the trophy's presence helped to "keep hockey Canadian".

=== Since 2019 ===
In the wake of the collapse of the CWHL, Canada was without top-level women's club hockey. More than 200 prominent women's players from Canada and the United States formed the Professional Women's Hockey Players Association (PWHPA) in May 2019 to advocate and build support for the creation of a stable, unified professional women's league. The Premier Hockey Federation (PHF), a professional league founded in the United States in 2015, expanded into Canada in 2020, but had its own championship trophy in the Isobel Cup. In 2023, the PWHPA and its business partners bought out the PHF and launched a new league, the Professional Women's Hockey League (PWHL), which comprises six teams, with three each in Canada and the US.

Ahead of the launch of the new league, Clarkson stated that she wanted the Clarkson Cup to be awarded to the PWHL champion. Others agreed, and it was suggested that the league could possibly incorporate both the Clarkson and Isobel Cups. However, in April 2024, the PWHL unveiled the Walter Cup—named after the Walter family, the league's financial backers—as its new championship trophy, leaving the Clarkson Cup in continued limbo.

== Design ==
The Clarkson Cup is made of silver and was designed by Nunavut Arctic College in Iqaluit. Clarkson commissioned Canadian silversmith Beth M. Biggs to make the trophy. She designed and built the sterling trophy and collaborated with three Inuit artists: Okpik Pitseolak, Therese Ukaliannuk, and Pootoogook Qiatsuk. The Inuit artists designed some of the decoration on the trophy. There are images of the goddess Sedna—one of the most powerful figures in Inuit tradition—Arctic animals, ancient masks and hockey masks, and the flowers of the provinces and territories of Canada. A loving cup comprises the top of the trophy. Names of winning teams are engraved onto the base of the trophy.

== Champions ==
The Clarkson Cup was first presented to Team Canada after their gold medal win at the 2006 Winter Olympics. However, it was meant to be presented as a club championship, and was awarded in this capacity for the first time in 2009.

Edition	Date	Winning team	Losing team	Score	Location	Notes
National Canadian Women's Championship
2009	March 21	Montreal Stars	Minnesota Whitecaps	3–1	Kingston, Ontario	
2010	March 28	Minnesota Whitecaps	Brampton Canadettes-Thunder	4–0	Richmond Hill, Ontario	
2011	March 27	Montreal Stars	Toronto CWHL	5–0	Barrie, Ontario	
Canadian Women's Hockey League
2012	March 25	Montreal Stars	Brampton Thunder	4–2	Niagara Falls, Ontario	
2013	March 23	Boston Blades	Montreal Stars	5–2	Markham, Ontario	
2014	March 22	Toronto Furies	Boston Blades	1–0 (OT)	Markham, Ontario	
2015	March 7	Boston Blades	Montreal Stars	3–2 (OT)	Markham, Ontario	
2016	March 13	Calgary Inferno	Les Canadiennes de Montréal	8–3	Ottawa, Ontario	
2017	March 5	Les Canadiennes de Montréal	Calgary Inferno	3–1	Ottawa, Ontario	
2018	March 25	Markham Thunder	Kunlun Red Star	2–1 (OT)	Toronto, Ontario	
2019	March 24	Calgary Inferno	Les Canadiennes de Montréal	5–2	Toronto, Ontario	

== Appearances ==
Clarkson Cup winning years denoted in bold.

Appearances	Team	Wins	Losses	Win %	Clarkson Cup finals
8	Montreal Stars/Les Canadiennes de Montréal	4	4	.500	**2009**, **2011**, **2012**, 2013, 2015, 2016, **2017**, 2019
3	Boston/Worcester Blades	2	1	.667	**2013**, 2014, **2015**
3	Calgary Inferno	2	1	.667	**2016**, 2017, **2019**
3	Brampton/Markham Thunder	1	2	.333	2010, 2012, **2018**
2	Minnesota Whitecaps	1	1	.500	2009, **2010**
2	Toronto Furies (Note: Toronto adopted the Furies moniker after their 2011 appearance; at the time, they were known simply as Toronto CWHL.)	1	1	.500	2011, **2014**
1	Kunlun Red Star	0	1	.000	2018

== All-time leaderboards ==
Skaters—scoring
Player	Team(s)	GP	G	A	Pts
Caroline Ouellette	Montréal	23	12	20	32
Hilary Knight	Boston, Montréal	17	14	12	26
Emmanuelle Blais	Montréal	23	8	11	19
Ann-Sophie Bettez	Montréal	19	9	7	16
Tessa Bonhomme	Calgary, Toronto	18	4	12	16
Sabrina Harbec	Montréal	12	5	10	15
Rebecca Johnston	Toronto, Calgary	12	8	6	14
Dominique Thibault	Montréal	15	7	7	14
Kelli Stack	Boston, Kunlun Red Star	11	4	10	14
Julie Chu	Montréal	21	3	11	14

Goaltenders—shutouts
Player	Team	GP	SO
Charline Labonté	Montréal	12	4
Jennifer Lavigne	Montréal	4	3
Geneviève Lacasse	Boston	7	2
Emerance Maschmeyer	Montréal	8	2

== See also ==
- List of sports awards honoring women
- List of awards presented by the governor general of Canada
- List of awards named after governors general of Canada
- Viceregal eponyms in Canada
