= Edmonton Chimos =

- City: Edmonton, Alberta
- League: Western Women's Hockey League
- Founded: 1973
- Folded: 2011
- Home arena: River Cree Twin Arenas
- Colours: Red, White and Blue
- General manager: Dee Bateman
- Head coach: Jason Schmidt

The Edmonton Chimos were a professional women's ice hockey team in the Western Women's Hockey League (WWHL). Founded in 1973, the team closed out its 38-year existence playing its home games at River Cree Twin Arenas in Edmonton, Canada. At that time, the team owner was Arlan Maschmayer.

== History ==
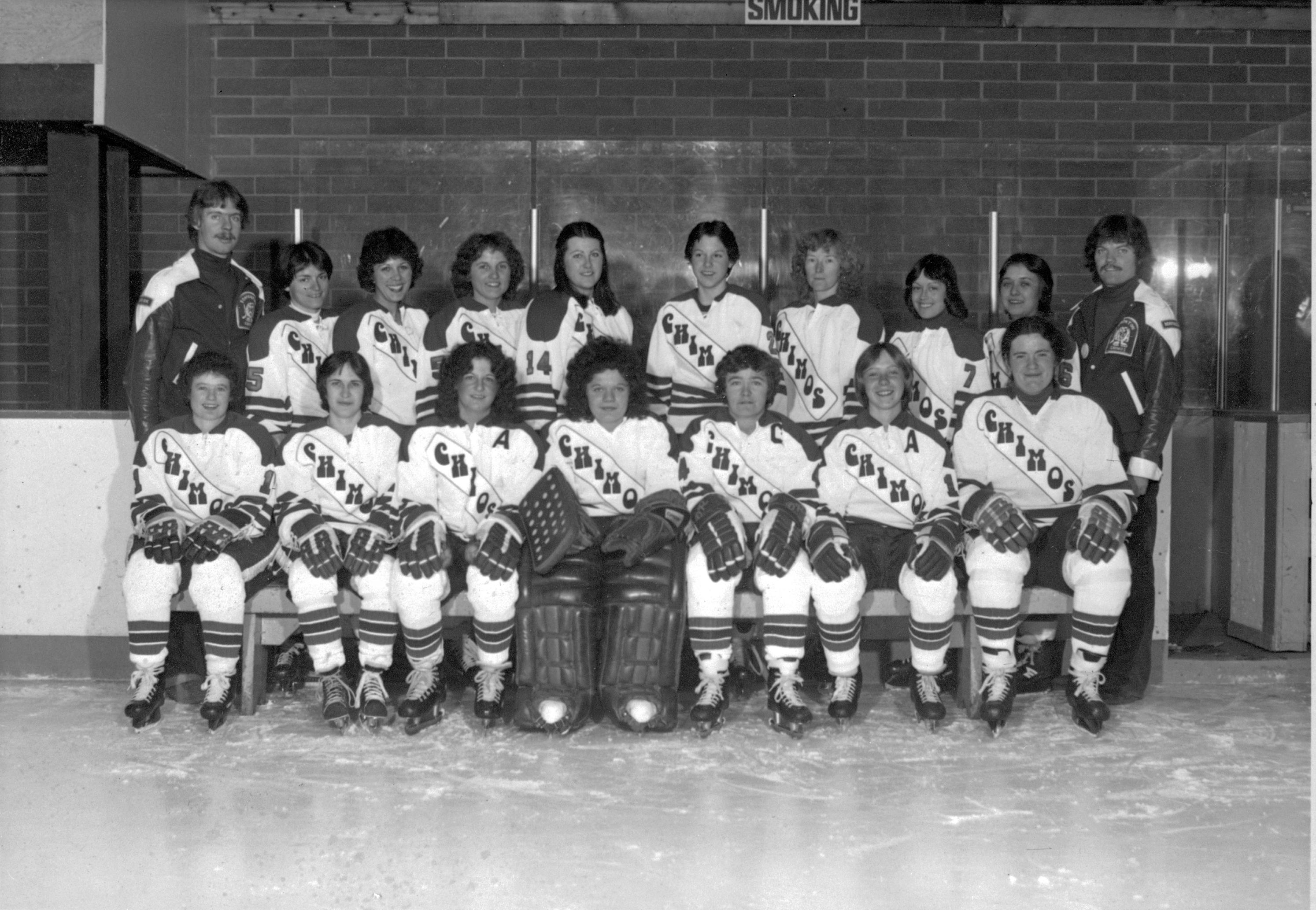
Edmonton Chimos (1980), Provincial A women's champions

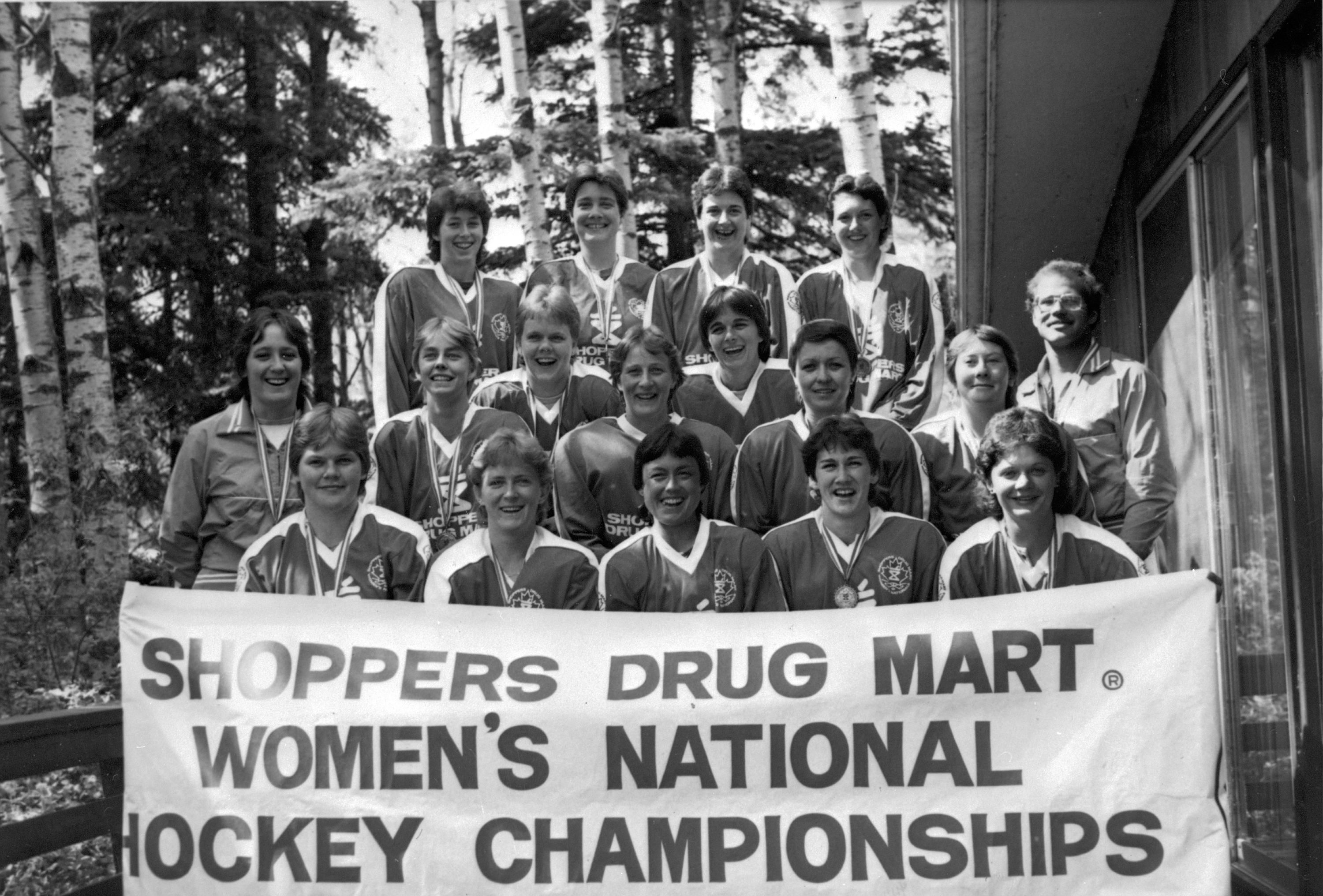
Edmonton Chimos (1984), National champions

The Chimos were founded in 1973 following ads looking for women in the Edmonton area who wanted to play hockey. By the 1980s, they had become the dominant women's team in Alberta, capturing every Alberta provincial championship, except for one, from 1982 to 1997. Representing Alberta at the Esso Canadian national championships 16 times in their history, the Chimos have captured the National title four times: 1984, 1985, 1992 and 1997. In 2001, the Chimos were approached to join the National Women's Hockey League, along with their provincial rival, the Calgary Oval X-Treme. They joined the league in 2002 with the Calgary Oval X-Treme and the Vancouver Griffins to form the NWHL's Western Division.

The Griffins folded after only one season, leaving just the two Alberta teams. Consistently overmatched by their Calgary rivals, and lacking true competition in the NWHL as the West division did not fly east, the Alberta clubs broke away from the NWHL to help form the five team Western Women's Hockey League in 2004 before the two leagues were once again united under the NWHL banner in 2006. However, this was short lived as the NWHL and WWHL could not reach an agreement upon a playoff schedule. As a result, the merger was not consummated. With the collapse of the NWHL in the summer of 2007, the Western Women's Hockey League was once again a completely independent league. The goal of the new league is to promote women’s hockey in the west.

For 2011–12 season, The Edmonton Chimos and Strathmore Rockies combined to form Team Alberta the Canadian Women's Hockey League (CWHL). The new team played in different locations in Alberta. The team became based out of both Calgary and Edmonton to accommodate all of western Canada's elite female players. Team Alberta would later become the Calgary Inferno.

== Season-by-season ==
-
Year	GP	W	L	T	GF	GA	Pts
2002–03	24	3	21	0	35	132	7
2003–04	12	1	11	0	9	64	2
2004–05	21	12	8	1	65	53	34
2005–06	24	16	5	3	102	47	35
2006–07	24	15	8	1	88	63	31
2007–08	24	9	11	4	74	78	22
2008–09	24	14	10	0	82	79	28
2009–10	18	7	7	4	40	48	18
2010–11	17	11	6	0	56	41	23

Note: GP = Games played, W = Wins, L = Losses, T = Ties, GF = Goals for, GA = Goals against, Pts = Points.

== Season standings ==
Year	League	Reg. season	Playoffs
2002-03	NWHL	3rd, Western	Did not qualify
2003-04	NWHL	2nd, Western	Did not qualify
2004-05	WWHL	3rd	Lost in final round
2005-06	WWHL	2nd	Lost in first round
2006-07	WWHL	2nd	Lost in first round
2007-08	WWHL	4th	Did not qualify
2008-09	WWHL	3rd	Lost in first round
2009-10	WWHL	3rd	Lost in first round
2010-11	WWHL	2nd	no participation to playoff

== Roster ==
The following roster is from.

Goaltenders
#	Country	Player	Catches	Age	Acquired	Former Team	Hometown
1	(Canada)	Keely Brown	L	49		Toronto Lady Blues - CIS	Kitchener, Ontario
31	(Canada)	Kristen Sugiyama	L	39	2010	Grant MacEwan Griffins - ACAC	Edmonton, Alberta
Defence
#	Country	Player	Shoots	Age	Acquired	Former Team	Hometown
6	(Canada)	Tegan Rose	L	32	2010	St. Albert Slash - AMMFHL	Gibbons, Alberta
9	(Canada)	Erin Duggan (C)	R	43	2007	Yale Bulldogs - NCAA	Beaumont, Alberta
12	(Canada)	Meaghan Mikkelson (A)	R	41	2007	Canadian National Women's Team	St. Albert, Alberta
14	(Canada)	Brittaney Maschmeyer	R	37	2010	Syracuse Orange - NCAA	Bruderheim, Alberta
17	(Canada)	Courtney Sawchuk (A)	L	37	2010	St. Lawrence Skating Saints - NCAA	Sherwood Park, Alberta
25	(Canada)	Taylor Williamson	R	32	2010		Spruce Grove, Alberta
81	(Canada)	Kelsey MacMillan	R	39	2009		Sherwood Park, Alberta
88	(Canada)	Tara Swanson	L	36	2010		Wetaskiwin, Alberta
Forwards
#	Country	Player	Shoots	Age	Acquired	Former Team	Hometown
5	(Canada)	Kelly Godel	R	37	2010	Edmonton Titans - NAFHA	Hythe, Alberta
8	(Canada)	Mallory Matheson	L	40	2008	NAIT Ooks - ACAC	Binscarth, Manitoba
11	(Canada)	Jennifer Moe	L	33	2010	Lloydminster Steelers - AMMFHL	Bonnyville, Alberta
16	(Canada)	Lauren Chiswell	L	38	2010	Grant MacEwan Griffins - ACAC	Edmonton, Alberta
18	(Canada)	Chelsea Purcell (A)	R	39	2010	Saskatchewan Huskies - CIS	Hudson Bay, Saskatchewan
19	(Canada)	Kathy Yeats	L	49			Coronation, Alberta
21	(Canada)	Lindsay Robinson	R	39	2009	Alberta Pandas - CIS	Edmonton, Alberta
24	(Canada)	Laura Dostaler	R	34	2009	Fort Saskatchewan Juniors	Beaumont, Alberta
27	(Canada)	Colleen Olson	R	37	2008		Sherwood Park, Alberta
33	(Canada)	Britney Millar	L	44		Mercyhurst Lakers - NCAA	Kingston, Ontario
77	(Germany)	Manuela Hebel	L	40	2010	Mannheim Kurpfalz	Freising, Germany

and

== Coaching staff ==
- Head Coach: Jason Schmidt
- Assistant Coach: Chip Sawchuk
- Assistant Coach: Matt Appelt
- Trainer: Pat Toner

== Awards winners ==
- Colette Prefontaine, Best Goaltender, 1998 Esso National championships

=== Scoring leaders ===
These are the top-ten point, goal, and assist scorers in franchise history. Figures are updated after each completed WWHL regular season.

Note: Pos = Position; GP = Games played; G = Goals; A = Assists; Pts = Points; P/G = Points per game; G/G = Goals per game; A/G = Assists per game; * = current Chimos player

Note: Statistics kept since 2004.

Points
Player	Pos	GP	G	A	Pts	P/G
Danielle Bourgeois	F	63	51	48	99	1.57
Britney Millar*	F	128	34	39	73	.57
Erin Duggan*	D	88	16	35	51	.58
Meaghan Mikkelson*	D	46	19	29	48	1.04
Tricia Guest	F	40	22	19	41	1.03
Jennifer Jeffrey	D	88	7	34	41	.47
Ashleigh Schols	F	48	11	25	36	.75
Kathy Yeats*	F	147	10	26	36	.24
Aimee Whittaker	F	40	15	17	32	.80
Kristen Hagg	F	24	10	20	30	1.25

Goals
Player	Pos	G	G/G
Danielle Bourgeois	F	51	.81
Britney Millar*	F	34	.27
Tricia Guest	F	22	.55
Meaghan Mikkelson*	D	19	.41
Erin Duggan*	D	16	.18
Aimee Whittaker	F	15	.38
Suzette Gillingham	F	15	.36
Courtney Sawchuk*	D	14	.33
Cami Wooster	F	11	.46
Ashleigh Schols	F	11	.23

Assists
Player	Pos	A	A/G
Danielle Bourgeois	F	48	.76
Britney Millar*	F	39	.30
Erin Duggan*	D	35	.40
Jennifer Jeffrey	D	34	.39
Meaghan Mikkelson*	D	29	.63
Kathy Yeats*	F	26	.18
Ashleigh Schols	F	25	.52
Cassea Schols	D	23	.34
Saige Pacholok	D	21	.30
Kristen Hagg	F	20	.83

== Honours ==
National
Competitions	Titles	Seasons
Hockey Canada's National Championships for the Abby Hoffman Cup	4	1984, 1985, 1992, 1997
Alberta Cup (provincial championship)	15	1982, 1983, 1984, 1985, 1986, 1987, 1988, 1989, 1990, 1991, 1992, 1993, 1994, 1996, 1997

== See also ==
- Western Women's Hockey League (WWHL)
- List of ice hockey teams in Alberta
