= Jenny Schmidgall-Potter =

American ice hockey player (born 1979)

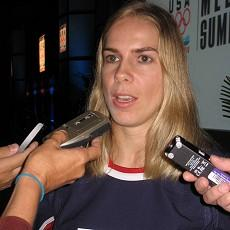
- Potter in 2010
- Born: January 12, 1979 (age 47) Saint Paul, Minnesota, U.S.
- Height: 5 ft 4 in (163 cm)
- Weight: 145 lb (66 kg; 10 st 5 lb)
- Position: Forward
- Shot: Left
- Played for: Minnesota Duluth; Minnesota Whitecaps; Boston Blades
- National team: United States
- Playing career: 1998–2015
Medal record
Women's ice hockey
Representing the United States
Olympic Games
Gold medal – first place	1998 Nagano	Team competition
Silver medal – second place	2002 Salt Lake City	Team competition
Silver medal – second place	2010 Vancouver	Team competition
Bronze medal – third place	2006 Turin	Team competition
World Championships
Gold medal – first place	2005 Sweden	Team competition
Gold medal – first place	2008 China	Team competition
Gold medal – first place	2009 Finland	Team competition
Gold medal – first place	2011 Switzerland	Team competition
Silver medal – second place	1999 Finland	Team competition
Silver medal – second place	2000 Canada	Team competition
Silver medal – second place	2001 United States	Team competition
Silver medal – second place	2004 Canada	Team competition
Silver medal – second place	2007 Canada	Team competition
Silver medal – second place	2012 United States	Team competition
4 Nations Cup
Gold medal – first place	2011 Sweden	Team competition
Silver medal – second place	2010 Canada	Team competition

Jennifer Lynn Schmidgall-Potter (born January 12, 1979) is an American former ice hockey player. She was a member of the United States women's national ice hockey team. She won a gold medal at the 1998 Winter Olympics, silver medals at the 2002 Winter Olympics and 2010 Winter Olympics, and a bronze medal at the 2006 Winter Olympics. After, she played for the Minnesota Whitecaps of the Western Women's Hockey League, where she won the league championship and was named MVP for the 2008–09 season. She was selected to the 2010 US Olympic team and was the only mother on the team.

== Playing career ==
=== NCAA ===
Her NCAA career included three years at the University of Minnesota Duluth, and one year at the University of Minnesota. Potter set an NCAA record (since tied) for most goals in one game with 6. This was accomplished on December 18, 2002 versus St. Cloud State. Potter is the all-time leading scorer in Bulldogs history and was named to the WCHA All-Decade team in 2009. She was a four-time All-American. On January 21, 2011, Potter, along with Bulldog alumni Caroline Ouellette and Maria Rooth, took part in a ceremonial faceoff to mark the first-ever game at Amsoil Arena.

=== Team USA ===
Schmidgall-Potter has been on the US women’s team since 1997, competing at three Winter Olympics, and at seven World Championships, winning gold medals in 2005, 2008, and 2009, and four silver medals in 1999, 2001, 2004, and 2007. As a 19-year-old, Schmidgall-Potter was the second youngest player on the 1998 U.S. Olympic Team. In 1999, she led the U.S. in scoring at the IIHF Women’s World Championships with 12 points in five games as the U.S. won the Silver Medal. By winning the silver medal at the 2010 Olympics, Potter became the most decorated Olympic medalist in Minnesota Duluth Bulldogs hockey history.

== Professional hockey ==
=== Minnesota Whitecaps ===
With the Minnesota Whitecaps, Potter was part of the first US-based team to win the Clarkson Cup. With the Clarkson Cup victory, Potter became an unofficial member of the Triple Gold Club (women are not yet recognized by the IIHF), as she became one of only three women to win the Clarkson Cup, a gold medal in ice hockey at the 1998 Winter Olympics, and a gold medal at the IIHF women's world hockey championships.

=== Boston Blades ===
In the summer of 2014, Potter was selected in the first round of the 2014 CWHL Draft to the Boston Blades. She played less than a full season for the Blades, while juggling coaching duties at Trinity College.

== Coaching career ==
In the summer of 2013 she was named head coach of the women's hockey team at Trinity College and remained in that position for two seasons.

=== NCAA ===
In spring 2015, Potter was named the third head coach in the history of the Ohio State Buckeyes women's ice hockey program, replacing Nate Hanrahan. She was released from the program in August 2016.

== Career stats ==
Event	Games Played	Goals	Assists	Points	+/-
1998 Olympics	6	2	3	5	+2
2002 Olympics	5	1	6	7	+6
2006 Olympics	5	2	7	9	+10
2010 Olympics	3	6	3	9	+7
Career	19	11	19	30	

=== WWHL ===
Season	GP	G	A	Pts	PIM	GW	PPL	SHG
2006–07	1	0	0	0	0	0	0	0
2007–08	20	8	26	34	14	1	0	1
2008–09	16	16	19	35	16	3	2	3
2010–11	12	8	13	21	6	0	0	0
Career	49	32	58	90	36	4	2	4

== Awards and honors ==
- Directorate Award, Best Forward, 1999 IIHF Women's World Hockey Championships
- Western Collegiate Hockey Association (WCHA) Player of the Year, 2000
- All-WCHA First Team, 2000
- Led NCAA in scoring, 2000, (41 goals, 52 assists, 93 points)
- WCHA Team of the Decade (2000’s)
- Vancouver 2010 Olympics, Media All-Star Team
- Triple Gold Club (unofficial)
- 2010 Bob Allen Women's Player of the Year Award

== Personal life ==
Schmidgall-Potter graduated from Edina High School in Minnesota. She was married in 2001 and is now a mother of 2. She took the 2000–2001 season off to give birth to her first child, daughter Madison. She delivered her second child, son Cullen in 2007. With her husband, Rob Potter, she runs a summer training camp called Potter’s Pure Hockey. Cullen plays college ice hockey at Arizona State, and was drafted 32nd overall by the Calgary Flames in the 2025 NHL entry draft.
