= Canadian Women's Hockey League =

Women's professional ice hockey league

CWHL
- Most recent season or competition: 2018–19 CWHL season
- Sport: Ice hockey
- Founded: 2007
- Folded: 2019
- Commissioner: Brenda Andress (2007–2018); Jayna Hefford (2018–19)interim
- No. of teams: 6
- Countries: Canada; China; United States
- Headquarters: Toronto, Ontario, Canada
- Last champion: Calgary Inferno
- Most titles: Montreal Stars/Les Canadiennes de Montréal (4 titles)
- Broadcaster: Rogers Sportsnet

The Canadian Women's Hockey League (CWHL; French: Ligue canadienne de hockey féminin ‒ LCHF) was a women's ice hockey league. Established in 2007 as a Canadian women's senior league in the Greater Toronto Area, Montreal, and Ottawa, the league expanded into Alberta (2011) and internationally in the United States (2010) and China (2017) throughout its tenure. The league discontinued operations on May 1, 2019, after 12 seasons.

For most of its existence, the CWHL was registered as an amateur association but was considered the top women's hockey league in North America. The National Women's Hockey League, later re-branded the Premier Hockey Federation, launched in the US in 2015 and was the first women's league to pay salaries. The CWHL began paying players a stipend during its last two seasons before it folded, citing financial difficulties. The collapse of the league resulted in the establishment of the Professional Women's Hockey Players Association (PWHPA), a nonprofit advocacy organization dedicated to the professionalization of women's hockey.

== History ==
=== Formation and early years (2007–2010) ===
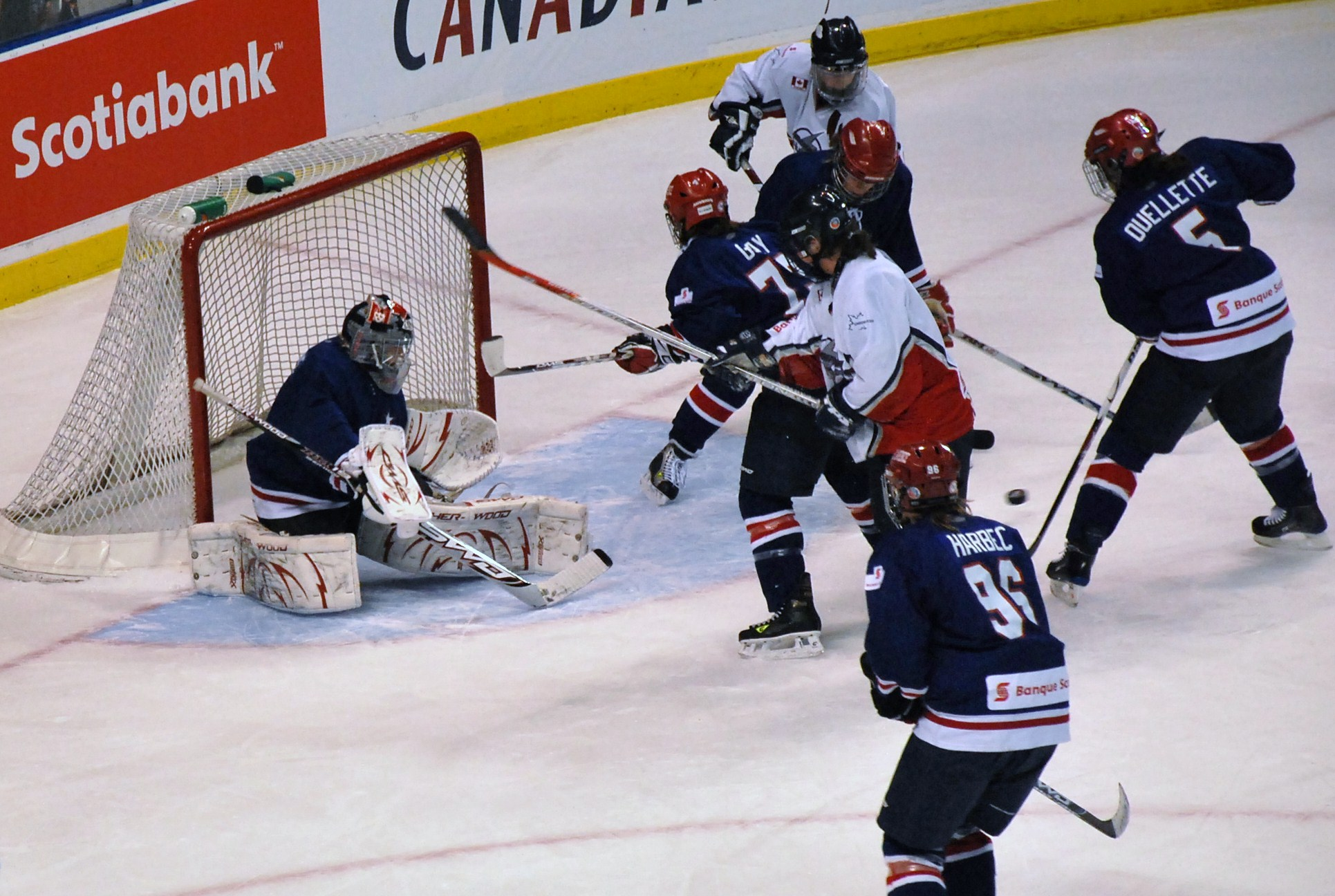
2009 Clarkson Cup action between the Montreal Stars and Brampton Thunder.

The CWHL was an initiative spearheaded by players including Jennifer Botterill, Lisa-Marie Breton, Allyson Fox, Kathleen Kauth, Kim McCullough, and Sami Jo Small, all of whom played in the original National Women's Hockey League, which disbanded in 2007. The players worked with a group of volunteer business people to form the CWHL. The league, which would operate as a non-profit business, would be responsible for all travel, ice rentals, uniforms, and some equipment costs, but would not pay salaries. Unlike the NWHL, in which teams were independently owned and operated, the CWHL was to be centrally run, and teams formed affiliations with local youth hockey associations. In addition to top Canadian players, the league ultimately attracted American and international players.

In 2007, Hockey Canada announced that it would revamp the Esso Women's Nationals, with the Western Women's Hockey League (WWHL) finalists meeting the CWHL finalists in a playoff. Beginning in 2009, teams from the two leagues competed for the Clarkson Cup at the end of the season.

The Brampton Thunder won the first CWHL championship in 2008, winning 4–3 over the Mississauga Chiefs in the final. In 2008–09, the Montreal Stars won 25 of 30 games and the CWHL championship, before going on to win the first Clarkson Cup over the Minnesota Whitecaps. The Stars would take a third straight regular season championship the following season. The CWHL did not have an individual playoff champion in 2010 but instead had a Clarkson Cup qualifying playoff. The Stars and Chiefs qualified for the Cup tournament from their regular season records and the Thunder qualified through the playoff. The Thunder then played into the Clarkson Cup final but lost to the Whitecaps.

=== Restructuring and stabilization (2010–2017) ===
Prior to the 2010–11 season, the league underwent a structural reorganization, which it considered a relaunch. Changes included the Chiefs, Ottawa Senators, and Vaughan Flames ceasing operations; the addition of a new Toronto team; and expansion into the United States with a team in Boston. This left the league with five teams: Montreal, Brampton, and the Burlington Barracudas, along with the Boston Blades and the Toronto Furies (who were referred to simply as Toronto CWHL during their inaugural season). The league also held its first draft in 2010, although it was limited the three Greater Toronto Area teams as the league decided that without paying salaries, it was infeasible to force players to relocate.

The league announced on April 19, 2011, that it would expand to Alberta ahead of the 2011–12 season, welcoming a single team combining the former Edmonton Chimos and Strathmore Rockies of the WWHL. The move effectively marked the end of the WWHL, and controversially left its remaining teams—the Whitecaps and the Manitoba Maple Leafs—as independent teams without a league to play in. The new CWHL team was initially called Team Alberta; it adopted the unofficial Alberta Honeybadgers moniker for its second season, before settling on becoming the Calgary Inferno in 2013. These developments also led to the Clarkson Cup becoming the playoff championship trophy solely for the CWHL.

Changes continued in 2012 with Burlington folding and the league creating a new draft system whereby players in Boston, Alberta, and Montreal could choose which team they would play on, while players in the GTA could be drafted to play for either of the two GTA teams—Brampton or Toronto. A player's pre-draft declaration of the regional area in which they wished to play could be altered after the draft. As a result of these rules, players wishing to leave GTA teams to play in Boston, Alberta, or Montreal could do so as desired, without compensation to the GTA team that they left. Players who wished to leave one GTA team to go to the other GTA team could only be moved upon a trade between the teams.

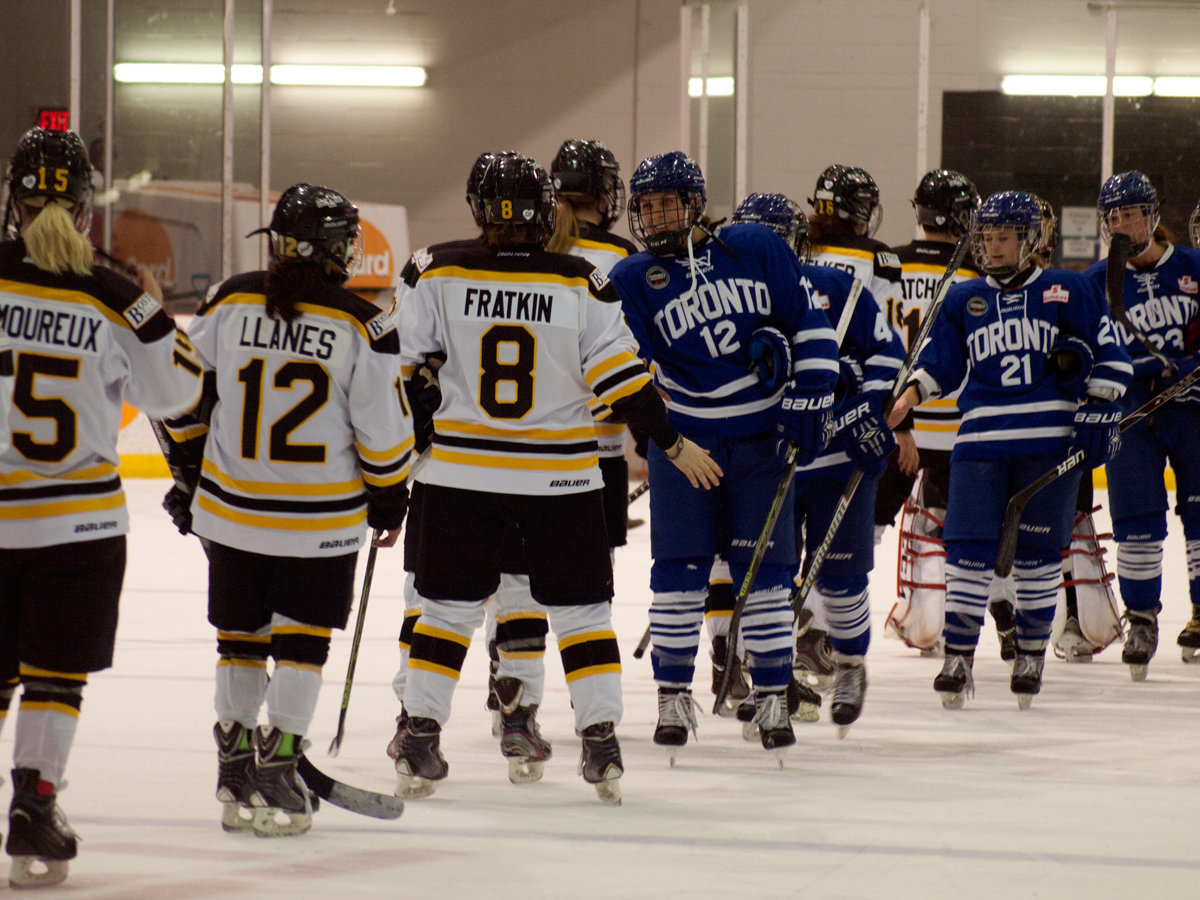
The Boston Blades and Toronto Furies shake hands after a game in 2015.

In November 2012, the CWHL announced partnerships between the Furies and Inferno with their local National Hockey League (NHL) counterparts, the Toronto Maple Leafs and Calgary Flames. The announcement marked a reversal from the position that sponsorships could not be directed to particular teams but only to the league, with the partnerships providing funding for coaches, equipment, and travel expenses, and greater opportunities for marketing and promotion. The Leafs partnership also led to the first CWHL All-Star Game in 2014, hosted by the Leafs at Air Canada Centre. In 2015, the league announced a similar arrangement between the Stars and the Montreal Canadiens, which led to the Stars re-branding as Les Canadiennes de Montréal. In 2012, the CWHL also announced a partnership with You Can Play, an LGTBQ organization, to promote inclusiveness—it was the first league to partner with the organization.

In early 2015, the CWHL began working with entrepreneur Dani Rylan to establish an expansion team in New York. However, Rylan ultimately changed plans and instead announced the establishment of a new National Women's Hockey League (NWHL) with four teams in the Northeastern United States. The new league claimed to be the first true professional women's hockey league, offering player salaries ranging from $10,000 to $26,000 per year. However, in 2017 the NWHL cut salaries in half, calling its stability into question.

=== Chinese expansion and player stipends (2017–2019) ===
The CWHL announced on June 5, 2017, that it would expand to China, adding Kunlun Red Star WIH, a team controlled by the Kontinental Hockey League's Kunlun Red Star, and the Vanke Rays, both based in Shenzhen. The expansion plan was designed to help Chinese hockey development in preparation for the 2022 Beijing Winter Olympics, while bringing significant partnership revenue to the CWHL. In order to minimize travel, each North American team made one trip to China to play a four-game series, while the Chinese teams likewise had road games in North America grouped into sets. Kunlun Red Star's debut season was a success, with the team advancing to the Clarkson Cup final, losing 2–1 in overtime to the Thunder.

Alongside the expansion, the league announced it would also begin paying its players for the first time. Player stipends were set to a minimum of $2,000 per season and a maximum of $10,000, with a $100,000 salary cap for teams. This made the CWHL the second North American women's hockey league to pay its players after the NWHL. The CWHL's move came shortly after the NWHL cut player salaries in half. Alongside the introduction of stipends, the CWHL also boosted prize money and salaries for coaches and managers. Despite the move to pay stipends, the CWHL remained registered as an amateur league with the Canada Revenue Agency.

In January 2018, the Furies' Jessica Platt came out as a transgender woman, making her the first transgender woman to come out in North American professional hockey, and second transgender professional player after Harrison Browne came out as a transgender man in the NWHL in 2016.

On July 19, 2018, league commissioner Brenda Andress announced she would be stepping down, and Jayna Hefford was named interim commissioner. The league consolidated its Chinese teams ahead of the 2018–19 season by merging Vanke and Kunlun, rebranding the team as Shenzhen KRS Vanke Rays. Before the end of the year, the league also restructured its board after losing its largest financial backer amid alleged economic challenges.

=== Collapse (2019) ===
On March 31, 2019, it was announced by the CWHL board of directors that the league would discontinue operations effective May 1. The league cited financial instability due in part to the fragmentation of corporate sponsors between the CWHL and NWHL, noting that the Chinese partnership had kept the league operating during the previous two seasons. The board of directors stated that it owed its players more than the league could continue to provide, suggested that there may only be room for one women's league, and encouraged the players to push any successor leagues to pay a livable wage. Players were not consulted prior to the decision, and tended to express shock and anger at the abrupt closure of the league.

The Furies, Les Canadiennes, and the Inferno all released statements that their organizations intended to continue supporting women's hockey and pursuing professional opportunities. However, The Shenzhen KRS Vanke Rays proved to be the only former CWHL team to participate in a 2019–20 season by joining the Russian Zhenskaya Hockey League.

==== CWHL/NWHL relations ====
Relations between the CWHL and the NWHL remained strained in the years after the latter was established. While the NWHL offered salaries, the league was persistently criticized for a lack of professionalism and its approach to growing the women's game. Over the years there were talks about merging the entities, with some women's hockey leaders emphasizing the need for a unified league and others stating that two or more could coexist. The relationship was further strained by a refusal by the NHL to fully back either entity, and suggesting that it had interest in starting its own women's league from scratch. As late as January 2019, NWHL commissioner Dani Rylan was pursuing the CWHL about a merger. On April 2, 2019, just days after the CWHL board announced its decision to dissolve the league, the NWHL announced plans to expand into Canada with franchises in Toronto and Montreal. The Toronto Six became the league's first Canadian franchise in 2020, and the Montreal Force were added in 2022.

==== PWHPA ====
After the collapse of the CWHL, more than 200 prominent women's players launched a boycott of North American leagues and founded the Professional Women's Hockey Players Association (PWHPA) to work toward the establishment of a unified, financially stable women's professional league. The PWHPA itself had a tumultuous relationship with the NWHL—which was rebranded as the Premier Hockey Federation (PHF) in 2021—rejecting overtures at merging and holding out for the construction of a new league with greater financial backing. For several years, players with the PWHPA courted corporate, media, and NHL partnerships, and organized a "Dream Gap" tour to showcase top-level women's hockey. In 2022, the PWHPA entered a partnership with Mark Walter and Billie Jean King, whose business enterprises went on to purchase the PHF in 2023, ending its existence shortly afterward. The PWHPA then organized a formal union and negotiated a collective bargaining agreement as part of the establishment of the Professional Women's Hockey League (PWHL), which began play in January 2024 with six teams in Canada and the US.

== Teams ==
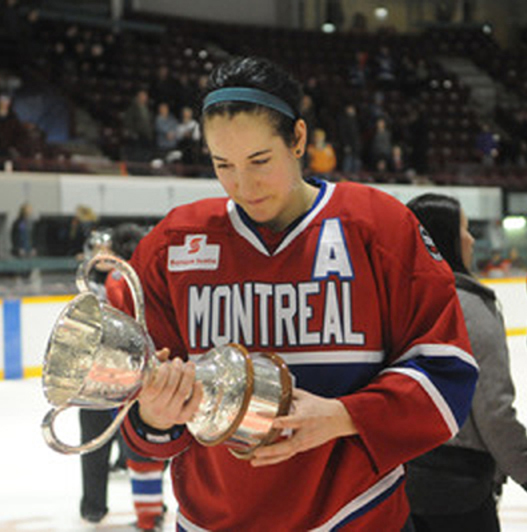
Montreal's Caroline Ouellette with the Clarkson Cup in 2011.

=== Final season (2018–19) ===
Team	City	Founded	Championships	Notes
Calgary Inferno	Calgary, Alberta	2011	2	Team Alberta (2011–12); Alberta Honeybadgers (2012–13)
Markham Thunder	Markham, Ontario	2007	2	Brampton Thunder (1998–2017)
Les Canadiennes de Montréal	Montréal, Quebec	2007	4	Montréal Stars (2007–2015)
Shenzhen KRS Vanke Rays	Shenzhen, Guangdong	2017	0	Merger of Kunlun Red Star WIH (2017–18) & Vanke Rays (2017–18)
Toronto Furies	Toronto, Ontario	2010	1	Toronto CWHL team (2010–11)
Worcester Blades	Worcester, Massachusetts	2010	2	Boston Blades (2010–2018)

=== Former teams ===
Team	City	Years active
Burlington Barracudas	Burlington, Ontario	2007–2012
Mississauga Chiefs	Mississauga, Ontario	2007–2010
Ottawa Senators	Ottawa, Ontario	2007–2010
Phénix du Québec	Montréal, Québec	2007–2008
Vanke Rays	Shenzhen, Guangdong	2017–2018
Vaughan Flames	Vaughan, Ontario	2007–2010

== Championships ==
Numbers in parentheses denotes number of titles won to that point.

Season	Playoff champion	Regular season title	Scoring champion
2007–08	Brampton Thunder	Montreal Stars	Jennifer Botterill
2008–09	Montreal Stars	Montreal Stars (2)	Jayna Hefford
2009–10	Minnesota Whitecaps^{[a]}	Montreal Stars (3)	Sabrina Harbec
2010–11	Montreal Stars (2)	Montreal Stars (4)	Caroline Ouellette
2011–12	Montreal Stars (3)	Montreal Stars (5)	Meghan Agosta
2012–13	Boston Blades	Boston Blades	Meghan Agosta-Marciano (2)
2013–14	Toronto Furies	Montreal Stars (6)	Ann-Sophie Bettez
2014–15	Boston Blades (2)	Boston Blades (2)	Rebecca Johnston
2015–16	Calgary Inferno	Les Canadiennes (7)	Marie-Philip Poulin
2016–17	Les Canadiennes (4)	Calgary Inferno	Jess Jones & Marie-Philip Poulin (2)
2017–18	Markham Thunder (2)	Les Canadiennes (8)	Kelli Stack
2018–19	Calgary Inferno (2)	Calgary Inferno (2)	Marie-Philip Poulin (3)

=== Notes ===
^{a} In 2009 and 2010, the Clarkson Cup was awarded in a playoff between teams from the CWHL and the WWHL; Minnesota was the 2010 WWHL champion and defeated Brampton in the 2010 Clarkson Cup finals.

== Drafts ==
The first league draft was held on August 12, 2010, at the Hockey Hall of Fame in Toronto; Olympic gold medalist Tessa Bonhomme was the first overall selection.

=== First overall picks ===
Draft year	Player	Team	College
2010	Tessa Bonhomme	Toronto Furies	Ohio State Buckeyes
2011	Meghan Agosta	Montreal Stars	Mercyhurst Lakers
2012	Hillary Pattenden	Alberta Honeybadgers	Mercyhurst Lakers
2013	Jessica Wong	Calgary Inferno	Minnesota Duluth Bulldogs
2014	Laura Fortino	Brampton Thunder	Cornell Big Red
2015	Sarah Edney	Brampton Thunder	Harvard Crimson
2016	Kayla Tutino	Boston Blades	Boston Terriers
2017	Courtney Turner	Boston Blades	Union College Dutchwomen
2018	Lauren Williams	Worcester Blades	Wisconsin Badgers women's ice hockey

== All-time leaderboard ==
=== All-time leading scorers (2007–08 to 2018–19) ===
The annual CWHL scoring champion was awarded the Angela James Bowl. In 2011–12, rookie Meghan Agosta set a CWHL single-season record with 80 points.

Player	Team(s)	Games	Goals	Assists	Points	PPG
Caroline Ouellette	Montreal Stars	202	143	203	346	1.71
Ann-Sophie Bettez	Montreal Stars	189	127	152	279	1.47
Jayna Hefford	Brampton Thunder	145	134	113	247	1.70
Marie-Philip Poulin	Montreal Stars	98	93	103	196	2.00
Noemie Marin	Montreal Stars	172	91	86	177	1.03
Jennifer Botterill	Mississauga Chiefs, Toronto Furies	87	68	98	166	1.91
Emmanuelle Blais	Montreal Stars	210	60	95	155	0.74
Gillian Apps	Brampton Thunder	142	80	68	148	1.04
Rebecca Johnston	Calgary Inferno	111	59	84	143	1.29
Meghan Agosta	Montreal Stars	58	62	73	135	2.34

=== All-time leaders in shutouts (2007–08 to 2014–15) ===
Kim St-Pierre (2008–09) and Sami Jo Small (2009–10) hold the single-season record with five shutouts.

Player	Team(s)	Shutouts
Sami Jo Small	Mississauga Chiefs, Toronto Furies	16
Charline Labonté	Montreal Stars	13
Emerance Maschmeyer	Calgary Inferno, Les Canadiennes de Montréal	12
Kim St-Pierre	Montreal Stars	9
Erica Howe	Brampton Thunder	9

== Television coverage ==
Sportsnet aired the CWHL playoffs and the league's All-Star Game from 2014–15 through 2018–19. The most watched game was the 2019 Clarkson Cup Final on March 24, 2019, with 175,000 viewers. Sportsnet was ultimately criticized for its limited coverage, broadcasting just three games per season, and its lack of licensing fees paid to the league, a problem common to women's sports.
