= Western Women's Hockey League =

Canadian hockey league

- Sport: Ice Hockey
- Founded: 2004
- Folded: 2011
- Countries: Canada

The Western Women's Hockey League (WWHL) was a women's hockey league in Canada. The league was established in 2004, and consisted of teams in Canada (some former National Women's Hockey League teams) and one from the United States. The league office was in Vancouver, British Columbia, and managed by Recreation Sports Management.

== History ==
On July 13, 2006, the National Women's Hockey League announced it would absorb the WWHL's teams into its new West division. However, scheduling conflicts between the 2007 Women's World Championships and the WWHL championship game saw the merger collapse.

In 2007, Hockey Canada announced it would revamp the Esso Women's Nationals, with the WWHL champion and finalist meeting the Canadian Women's Hockey League (CWHL) champion and finalist. Since 2009, teams from the two leagues instead compete for the Clarkson Cup at the end of the season.

In 2010, the WWHL champion Minnesota Whitecaps won the Clarkson Cup tournament, defeating three rivals from the CWHL.

The CWHL announced on April 19, 2011, that it would merge with the Western Women's Hockey League for the 2011–12 season. The merger would feature one team based in Edmonton and Calgary and would be combination of the former WWHL franchises the Edmonton Chimos and Strathmore Rockies. The team would play their games in various locations around Alberta.

However, the WWHL was never folded properly. The WWHL executive committee accepted the resignations of the owners of the Strathmore Rockies and Edmonton Chimos at their meeting in Minneapolis on August 19, 2011. The president of the WWHL also stepped down at that time. New board members were elected and the league began a series of monthly board meetings to develop their 2011–12 season and their strategic plan as sanctioned by Hockey Alberta.

In 2012, the relations between the LCHF and the WWHL tightened: the director-manager of the Minnesota Whitecaps accused the CWHL of deliberately sabotaging possible participation of Whitecaps in the next Clarkson Cup tournament.

As of 2015, the league website is defunct. The Minnesota Whitecaps continue to be an active team as part of the National Women's Hockey League, and the Manitoba Maple Leafs were active as late as 2014.

== Championship ==
The champion of the WWHL is given the WWHL Champions cup.

A list of WWHL winners (winner is in bold):

- 2004–05 - **Calgary Oval X-Treme** vs. Edmonton Chimos in Calgary, Alberta
- 2005–06 - **Calgary Oval X-Treme** vs. Minnesota Whitecaps in Lumsden, Saskatchewan
- 2006–07 - **Calgary Oval X-Treme** vs. Minnesota Whitecaps
- 2007–08 - **Calgary Oval X-Treme** vs. Minnesota Whitecaps
- 2008–09 - **Minnesota Whitecaps** vs. Calgary Oval X-Treme
- 2009–10 - **Minnesota Whitecaps** vs. Strathmore Rockies
- 2010–11 - **Minnesota Whitecaps**

== Former teams ==
Team	City	Home arena	Existed	Notes
British Columbia Breakers	Langley, British Columbia		2004–09	Ceased operations at the height of the season 2008–2009. After the difficult season of rebuilding in 2007–2008 the new owners of the team were not capable of correcting the financial situation of the team.
Calgary Oval X-Treme	Calgary, Alberta	Olympic Oval	2003–09	
Edmonton Chimos	Edmonton, Alberta	River Cree Twin Arenas	2003–11	Merged with Strathmore to become Calgary Inferno in Canadian Women's Hockey League after WWHL folded.
Manitoba Maple Leafs	Winnipeg, Manitoba	MTS Iceplex	2010–11	Continued to exist for several years after WWHL folded.
Minnesota Whitecaps	Saint Paul, Minnesota	TRIA Rink	2004–11	Joined National Women's Hockey League after WWHL folded.
Saskatchewan Prairie Ice	Lumsden, Saskatchewan	Lumsden Arena	2003–07	
Strathmore Rockies	Strathmore, Alberta	Strathmore Family Center Arena	2006–11	Merged with Edmonton to become Calgary Inferno in Canadian Women's Hockey League after WWHL folded.

The Chinese national women's team also played an exhibition schedule against WWHL teams in the 2007–08 season with points counting in league standings.

== See also ==
- Clarkson Cup
- 2010 Clarkson Cup
- 2011 Clarkson Cup
- Canadian Women's Hockey League
