= British Columbia Breakers =

- City: Langley, Vancouver, British Columbia, Canada
- League: National Women's Hockey League; Western Women's Hockey League
- Founded: 2004
- Folded: 2009
- Owner(s): Nu Global Sports Inc

The British Columbia Breakers were a professional women's ice hockey team in the National Women's Hockey League (NWHL). The team played its home games in Langley, a suburb of Vancouver, British Columbia, Canada. The Owner of the Breakers was Nu Global Sports Inc.

== History ==
The British Columbia Breakers is an ice hockey team in the Western Women's Hockey League (WWHL). It was formed in 2004 as a charter member of the league. In 2006, it was announced that the WWHL would be absorbed into the National Women's Hockey League. However, this was short lived as the NWHL and WWHL could not reach an agreement upon a playoff schedule. As a result, the merger was not consummated. With the collapse of the NWHL in the summer of 2007, the Western Women's Hockey League was once again a completely independent league.

== Season-by-season ==
In their first season, the Breakers finished with a record of five wins, 15 losses, and one tie. They were led in scoring by American veteran Cammi Granato, who had 8 goals and 11 assists for 19 points. Kyla Gillespie and Jodi Faye led the team with 9 goals each, Gillespie in only 14 games. The Breakers came fourth out of five teams and missed the playoffs.

In 2005–2006, the team finished in last place of the five teams—with a record of 21 losses and 3 ties. Melissa Anderson led the team in both goals (9) and total points (15), even though she only played 14 of the 24 games. Goaltender Jennifer Price, who faced almost 50 shots per game (and saved about 91% of them), was named the league's defensive player of the year.

The 2006-2007 season showed some promise as the Breakers received a few new players who helped them develop their team. Under the guidance of Jeff Bandura the team had its best season to date. Even so, management was pursued by the players to relieve Jeff Bandura of his duties.

In 2007-2008 Proved to be a tough rebuild from the 2006-07 season, as a number of key players had left. Nat Christensen (formerly a player of the Vancouver Griffins) was appointed head coach. The 2007-2008 edition of the breakers went winless through difficult season.

In 2008-2009 the team was stronger than 2007-08, and it looked to be a promising season. This season, however, was riddled with financial problems from its ownership and proved to be costly on the players. Although the team dynamics were strong, it was not enough to save the team from being pulled at the peak of the season due to the ownership unable to front the costs he committed to. The sports management group had pulled out earlier in the season seeing the writing on the wall. The Breakers were forced to end their season early and are no longer a part of the WWHL.

-
| Year | GP | W | L | T | GF | GA | Pts |
|---|---|---|---|---|---|---|---|
| 2004–05 | 21 | 5 | 15 | 1 | 49 | 98 | 14 |
| 2005–06 | 24 | 0 | 21 | 3 | 40 | 127 | 3 |
| 2006–07 | 24 | 8 | 15 | 0 | 71 | 121 | 17 |
| 2007–08 | 24 | 0 | 22 | 2 | 23 | 135 | 2 |
| 2008–09 | 24 | 0 | 22 | 2 | 17 | 76 | 2 |

Note: GP = Games played, W = Wins, L = Losses, T = Ties, GF = Goals for, GA = Goals against, Pts = Points.

== Season standings ==
| Year | Regular season | Playoffs |
|---|---|---|
| 2004-05 | 4th | no participation in playoff |
| 2005-06 | 5th | no participation in playoff |
| 2006-07 | 4th | eliminated in first round |
| 2007-08 | 5th | no participation in playoff |
| 2008-09 | 5th | no participation in playoff |

== Last roster 2008-09 ==
Goalies
| Number | | Player | Former Team | Hometown |
|---|---|---|---|---|
| 30 | (Canada) | Kayla Canning | | Abbotsford, British Columbia |
| 1 | (Canada) | Desirae Clark | B.C. Breakers | Salmo, British Columbia |

Defense
| Number | | Player | Former Team | Hometown |
|---|---|---|---|---|
| 77 | (Canada) | Veronica Lang | | Richmond, British Columbia |
| 19 | (Canada) | Amy De Bree | | Shawnigan Lake, British Columbia |
| 15 | (Canada) | Katie Welsh | BC Breakers | Abbotsford, British Columbia |
| 7 | (Canada) | Sandra Wright | | Langley, British Columbia |
| n/a | (Canada) | Rayna Cruickshank |

Forwards
| Number | | Player | Former Team | Hometown |
|---|---|---|---|---|
| 93 | (Canada) | Jennifer Kindret | B.C. Breakers | Winnipeg, Manitoba |
| 24 | (Canada) | Emily McGrath-Agg | | Vancouver, British Columbia |
| 20 | (Canada) | Natashia Pellatt | | Langley, British Columbia |
| 18 | (United States) | Alana Bremiller | BC Breakers | Millbrook, New York, |
| 17 | (Canada) | Silvia Traversa | BC Breakers | Vancouver, British Columbia |
| 16 | (Canada) | Danielle Grundy | B.C. Breakers | Kelowna, British Columbia |
| 14 | (Canada) | Kyla Gillespie | | Nanaimo, British Columbia |
| 9 | (Canada) | Katy Lacasse | | Comox, British Columbia |
| 6 | (United States) | Anne Girtz | | Minneapolis, Minnesota |
| 4 | (Canada) | Stephanie Burlton | B.C. Breakers | Vancouver, British Columbia |
| n/a | (Canada) | Kathleen McDonald | B.C. Breakers |
| n/a | (Canada) | Mary Darvill | B.C. Breakers | West Vancouver, British Columbia |

== Coaching staff 2008-09 ==
- Head Coach: Natalie Christensen
- Assistant Coach: Ken Welsh
- Manager Player/Equipment: Maureen Hawkes
