= Strathmore Rockies =

- City: Strathmore, Alberta
- League: Western Women's Hockey League
- Founded: 2008
- Folded: 2011
- Home arena: Strathmore Family Center
- Colours: Black, Purple and White
- General manager: Samantha Holmes
- Head coach: Tom Molloy

The Strathmore Rockies were a professional women's ice hockey team in the Western Women's Hockey League (WWHL). The team played its home games in Strathmore Family Center Arena, in Strathmore, Alberta, Canada.

== History ==
Their first season in the WWHL was in 2008-09 and its team founders were Samantha Holmes and Brigitte Lessard. The idea to start her own team stemmed from the fact that there were many elite hockey players in Calgary, but not all of them had the opportunity to play for the Calgary Oval X-Treme. Holmes and Lessard founded the Strathmore Rockies so that elite level players in Alberta would have another team to compete for. Holmes also handled the day-to-day tasks of running the Strathmore team. Part of her accomplishments included player scouting, sponsorship and marketing campaigns to operate the team. She was also captain of the Rockies and runs local skills clinics in Calgary for young women's players.

In 2011, The Strathmore Rockies and Edmonton Chimos combined to form the new Team Alberta entry into the Canadian Women's Hockey League (CWHL) which later became the Calgary Inferno.

== Season-by-season ==
-
Year	GP	W	L	T	GF	GA	Pts
2008–09	23	6	16	1	36	126	13
2009–10	18	7	7	4	40	48	18
2010–11	11	0	10	1	21	64	1

Note: GP = Games played, W = Wins, L = Losses, T = Ties, GF = Goals for, GA = Goals against, Pts = Points,

== Season standings ==
Year	Regular season	Playoffs
2008-09	4th	eliminated in first round
2009-10	3rd	eliminated in first round
2010-11	4th	no participation to playoff

== Notable player ==
- Bobbi-Jo Slusar

== See also ==
- Western Women's Hockey League (WWHL)
