= 2023–24 Minnesota Golden Gophers women's ice hockey season =

NCAA Quarterfinals, L 2–3 (4OT) v. Clarkson
- Conference: WCHA
- Home ice: Ridder Arena

Rankings
- USA Today: 5
- USCHO.com: 5

Record
- Overall: 27–10–2
- Conference: 19–7–2–3
- Home: 14–4–1
- Road: 11–5–1
- Neutral: 2–1–0

Coaches and captains
- Head coach: Brad Frost (17th season)
- Assistant coaches: Greg May; Jessica Scott; Mitch Baker
- Captain: Peyton Hemp
- Alternate captain(s): Madeline Wethington; Abbey Murphy; Ella Huber

The 2023–24 Minnesota Golden Gophers women's ice hockey season represent the University of Minnesota during the 2023–24 NCAA Division I women's ice hockey season. They were coached by Brad Frost in his 17th season. The Golden Gophers received an at-large bid to the 2024 NCAA tournament where lost to Clarkson 2–3 in quadruple overtime in the quarterfinals of the tournament.

== Offseason ==
=== Players drafted ===
Professional Women's Hockey League
Round	Player	Position	Team
1	Taylor Heise	F	PWHL Minnesota
3	Grace Zumwinkle	F	PWHL Minnesota

=== Recruiting ===
Player	Position	Nationality	Notes
Lucy Morgan	Goaltender	United States	Transfer from St. Lawrence University
Solveig Neunzert	Defense	Germany	Transfer from Princeton
Taylor Stewart	Defense	United States	Transfer from Minnesota Duluth
Isa Goettl	Forward	United States	Andover High School
Josie Hemp	Defense	United States	Minnetonka High School
Emma Kreisz	Forward	Hungary	Stanstead College
Elly Klepinger	Defense	United States	Minnetonka High School
Ava Lindsay	Forward	United States	Minnetonka High School
Lauren O'Hara	Forward	United States	Centennial High School

== Standings ==
2023–24 Western Collegiate Hockey Association standings
	Conference										Overall					
	GP	W	L	T	OTW	OTL	SOW	PTS	GF	GA	GP	W	L	T	GF	GA
#1 Ohio State †	28	26	2	0	2	0	0	78	140	37	39	35	4	0	201	51
#2 Wisconsin *	28	23	5	0	2	1	0	69	124	43	41	35	6	0	205	62
#5 Minnesota	28	19	7	1	1	2	2	62	92	60	39	27	10	2	135	80
#7 Minnesota Duluth	28	15	11	2	0	0	0	47	64	47	39	21	14	4	89	66
#10 St. Cloud State	28	12	14	2	0	1	0	40	60	59	34	17	17	2	78	69
Minnesota State	28	6	22	0	1	2	0	19	52	94	38	13	25	0	97	120
St. Thomas	28	4	23	1	0	0	1	11	39	120	37	10	26	1	74	150
Bemidji State	28	3	24	1	0	0	0	10	33	144	36	4	30	2	42	181
Championship: March 9, 2024 † indicates conference regular season champion; * indicates conference tournament champion Rankings: USCHO.com; updated March 24, 2023

== Roster ==
No.	Nat.	Player	Class	Pos	Height	DoB	Hometown	Previous team
2		Taylor Stewart	Graduate	D	5' 10" (1.78 m)	2000-11-10	Rochester, Minnesota	Minnesota Duluth (WCHA)
4		Audrey Wethington	Senior	F	5' 7" (1.7 m)	2002-04-01	Edina, Minnesota	Blake School
5		Madeline Wethington (A)	Graduate	D	5' 10" (1.78 m)	2000-07-14	Edina, Minnesota	Blake School
6		Josie Hemp	Freshman	D	5' 9" (1.75 m)	2004-12-16	Chanhassen, Minnesota	Minnetonka High School
7		Nelli Laitinen	Sophomore	D	5' 7" (1.7 m)	2002-04-29	Lohja, Finland	Kiekko-Espoo
8		Sadie Lindsay	Junior	F	5' 7" (1.7 m)	2003-07-03	Minnetonka, Minnesota	Breck School
9		Ava Lindsay	Freshman	F	5' 6" (1.68 m)	2005-02-20	Minnetonka, Minnesota	Minnetonka High School
10		Emily Zumwinkle	Junior	D	5' 9" (1.75 m)	2003-05-20	Excelsior, Minnesota	Breck School
11		Josefin Bouveng	Sophomore	F	5' 9" (1.75 m)	2001-05-15	Vassunda, Sweden	Brynäs IF
12		Isa Goettl	Freshman	F	5' 1" (1.55 m)	2004-10-09	Andover, Minnesota	Andover High School
13		Emma Kreisz	Freshman	F	5' 9" (1.75 m)	2003-09-02	Budapest, Hungary	Stanstead College
14		Maggie Nicholson	Senior	D	5' 9" (1.75 m)	2002-03-21	Minnetonka, Minnesota	Minnetonka High School
15		Peyton Hemp (C)	Junior	F	5' 5" (1.65 m)	2003-05-15	Andover, Minnesota	Andover High School
16		Allie Franco	Sophomore	D	5' 7" (1.7 m)	2004-01-27	Oakdale, Minnesota	Hill-Murray School
17		Josey Dunne	Senior	F	5' 10" (1.78 m)	2002-02-11	O'Fallon, Missouri	Chicago Mission
18		Abbey Murphy (A)	Junior (RS)	F	5' 5" (1.65 m)	2002-04-14	Evergreen Park, Illinois	Chicago Mission
20		Emma Conner	Sophomore (RS)	F	5' 8" (1.73 m)	2002-10-01	Edina, Minnesota	Edina High School
21		Lauren O'Hara	Freshman	F	5' 11" (1.8 m)	2005-03-02	Blaine, Minnesota	Centennial High School
22		Elly Klepinger	Freshman	D	5' 9" (1.75 m)	2005-02-08	Corcoran, Minnesota	Minnetonka High School
23		Tristana Tatur	Junior	F	5' 8" (1.73 m)	2003-02-03	Maple Grove, Minnesota	Maple Grove High School
26		Ella Huber (A)	Junior	F	5' 6" (1.68 m)	2002-12-18	Northfield, Illinois	Chicago Mission
27		Solveig Neunzert	Graduate	D	5' 9" (1.75 m)	1999-11-14	Passau, Germany	Princeton (ECAC)
29		Madison Kaiser	Sophomore	F	5' 7" (1.7 m)	2004-07-10	Ham Lake, Minnesota	Holy Family Catholic High School
31		Skylar Vetter	Junior	G	5' 8" (1.73 m)	2003-05-14	Lakeville, Minnesota	Lakeville North High School
32		Lucy Morgan	Graduate	G	5' 7" (1.7 m)	2001-01-01	Mandan, North Dakota	St. Lawrence University (ECAC)
35		Sophia Johnson	Sophomore	G	5' 8" (1.73 m)	2004-04-16	Minnetonka, Minnesota	Minnetonka High School

== Regular season ==
=== Schedule ===
As of March 17, 2024.

Date	Time	Opponent^{#}	Rank^{#}	Site	Decision	Result	Attendance	Record
Regular Season
Oct 6	4:00	at RIT*	#4	Gene Polisseni Center • Henrietta, NY	Vetter	W 3–0	659	1–0–0 (0–0–0)
Oct 7	4:00	at RIT*	#4	Gene Polisseni Center • Henrietta, NY	Morgan	W 5–1	488	2–0–0 (0–0–0)
Oct 13	4:00	at St. Thomas	#4	Xcel Energy Center • St. Paul, MN	Vetter	W 8–0	10,125	3–0–0 (1–0–0)
Oct 14	4:00	at St. Thomas	#4	St. Thomas Ice Arena • Mendota Heights, MN	King	W 4–0	545	4–0–0 (2–0–0)
Oct 17	7:00	#13 St. Cloud State	#4	Ridder Arena • Minneapolis, MN	Vetter	W 2–1	1,602	5–0–0 (3–0–0)
Oct 27	4:00	at #2 Ohio State	#4	The Ohio State University Ice Rink • Columbus, OH	Vetter	L 3–4 ^{OT}	713	5–1–0 (3–1–0)
Oct 28	1:00	at #2 Ohio State	#4	The Ohio State University Ice Rick • Columbus, OH	Vetter	L 5–6	617	5–2–0 (3–2–0)
Nov 3	6:00	Minnesota State	#4	Ridder Arena • Minneapolis, MN	Morgan	W 3–1	2,019	6–2–0 (4–2–0)
Nov 4	3:00	at Minnesota State	#4	Mayo Clinic Health System Event Center • Mankato, MN	Vetter	W 2–1	307	7–2–0 (5–2–0)
Nov 17	6:00	at #8 Minnesota Duluth	#4	AMSOIL Arena • Duluth, MN	Vetter	W 3–1	1,287	8–2–0 (6–2–0)
Nov 18	3:00	at #8 Minnesota Duluth	#4	AMSOIL Arena • Duluth, MN	Morgan	W 3–1	982	9–2–0 (7–2–0)
Nov 24	11:00	vs. Harvard*	#4	Arlington, VA (D1 in DC)	Morgan	W 3–1	907	10–2–0 (7–2–0)
Nov 25	2:00	vs. #8 Cornell*	#4	Arlington, VA (D1 in DC)	Vetter	W 5–1	1,152	11–2–0 (7–2–0)
Dec 1	6:00	Bemidji State	#3	Ridder Arena • Minneapolis, MN	Vetter	W 9–2	1,594	12–2–0 (8–2–0)
Dec 2	2:00	Bemidji State	#3	Ridder Arena • Minneapolis, MN	Morgan	W 9–1	1,510	13–2–0 (9–2–0)
Dec 5	6:00	at #8 St. Cloud State	#2	Herb Brooks National Hockey Center • St. Cloud, MN	Vetter	T 1–1 ^{SO}	702	13–2–1 (9–2–1–1)
Dec 8	6:00	#3 Wisconsin	#2	Ridder Arena • Minneapolis, MN	Morgan	W 5–3	2,794	14–2–1 (10–2–1–1)
Dec 9	2:00	#3 Wisconsin	#2	Ridder Arena • Minneapolis, MN	Vetter	L 1–5	2,932	14–3–1 (10–3–1–1)
Jan 5	6:00	#11 Connecticut*	#2	Ridder Arena • Minneapolis, MN	Morgan	W 5–3	1,640	15–3–1 (10–3–1–1)
Jan 6	2:00	#11 Connecticut*	#2	Ridder Arena • Minneapolis, MN	Vetter	W 3–1	1,890	16–3–1 (10–3–1–1)
Jan 12	6:00	#1 Ohio State	#2	Ridder Arena • Minneapolis, MN	Morgan	L 0–7	2,387	16–4–1 (10–4–1–1)
Jan 13	2:00	#1 Ohio State	#2	Ridder Arena • Minneapolis, MN	Vetter	L 1–6	2,186	16–5–1 (10–5–1–1)
Jan 19	6:00	at Bemidji State	#5	Sanford Center • Bemidji, MN	Morgan	W 2–0	586	17–5–1 (11–5–1–1)
Jan 20	3:00	at Bemidji State	#5	Sanford Center • Bemidji, MN	Vetter	W 3–1	890	18–5–1 (12–5–1–1)
Jan 26	6:00	Minnesota State	#5	Ridder Arena • Minneapolis, MN	Morgan	W 4–3	3,122	19–5–1 (13–5–1–1)
Jan 27	2:00	at Minnesota State	#5	Mayo Clinic Health System Event Center • Mankato, MN	Vetter	W 2–1 ^{OT}	457	20–5–1 (14–5–1–2)
Feb 2	6:00	St. Thomas	#5	Ridder Arena • Minneapolis, MN	Morgan	W 3–1	1,630	21–5–1 (15–5–1–2)
Feb 3	4:30	St. Thomas	#5	Ridder Arena • Minneapolis, MN	Vetter	W 5–2	1,912	22–5–1 (16–5–1–2)
Feb 9	6:00	at #10 St. Cloud State	#5	Herb Brooks National Hockey Center • St. Cloud, MN	Vetter	W 1–0	400	23–5–1 (17–5–1–2)
Feb 10	2:00	#10 St. Cloud State	#5	Ridder Arena • Minneapolis, MN	Morgan	W 5–1	1,836	24–5–1 (18–5–1–2)
Feb 16	7:00	at #2 Wisconsin	#5	LaBahn Arena • Madison, WI	Vetter	L 3–4 ^{OT}	2,273	24–6–1 (18–6–1–2)
Feb 17	2:00	at #2 Wisconsin	#5	LaBahn Arena • Madison, WI	Morgan	L 0–4	2,273	24–7–1 (18–7–1–2)
Feb 23	6:00	#8 Minnesota Duluth	#4	Ridder Arena • Minneapolis, MN	Vetter	T 1–1 ^{SO}	2,125	24–7–2 (18–7–2–3)
Feb 24	2:00	#8 Minnesota Duluth	#4	Ridder Arena • Minneapolis, MN	Morgan	W 4–2	2,234	25–7–2 (19–7–2–3)
WCHA Tournament
Mar 1	6:00	Minnesota State*	#4	Ridder Arena • Minneapolis, MN	Vetter	L 4–5	1,069	25–8–2 (19–7–2–3)
Mar 2	3:00	Minnesota State*	#4	Ridder Arena • Minneapolis, MN	Morgan	W 7–1	1,226	26–8–2 (19–7–2–3)
Mar 3	3:00	Minnesota State*	#4	Ridder Arena • Minneapolis, MN	Morgan	W 3–0	1,106	27–8–2 (19–7–2–3)
Mar 8	4:30	#2 Wisconsin*	#5	Ridder Arena • Minneapolis, MN	Vetter	L 3–4 ^{OT}	2,026	27–9–2 (19–7–2–3)
NCAA Tournament
Mar 16	1:00	at #4 Clarkson*	#5	Cheel Arena • Potsdam, NY	Morgan	L 2–3 ^{4OT}	2,041	27–10–2 (19–7–2–3)
*Non-conference game. ^{#}Rankings from USCHO.com Poll.
