= 2025–26 Minnesota Golden Gophers women's ice hockey season =

Quarterfinals, L 2–4 vs Northeastern
- Conference: WCHA
- Home ice: Ridder Arena

Rankings
- USCHO.com: 4
- USA Hockey: 4

Record
- Overall: 26–12–1
- Conference: 18–9–1
- Home: 12–7–1
- Road: 14–4–0

Coaches and captains
- Head coach: Brad Frost (19th season)
- Assistant coaches: Greg May; Jessica Scott; Mitch Baker
- Captain(s): Abbey Murphy; Nelli Laitinen

The 2025–26 Minnesota Golden Gophers women's ice hockey season represented the University of Minnesota during the 2025–26 NCAA Division I women's ice hockey season.

== Offseason ==
=== Departing players ===
Players who left the Gophers after last season
| Player | Position | Class | Destination |
|---|---|---|---|
| Emma Connor | Forward | Graduate | Boston College |
| Peyton Hemp | Forward | Graduated | Ottawa Charge |
| Ella Huber | Forward | Graduated | Boston Fleet |
| Olivia King | Goaltender | Graduated | |
| Elly Klepinger | Defender | Junior | Bemidji State |
| Kate Kosobud | Defender | Sophomore | Minnesota Duluth |
| Natálie Mlýnková | Forward | Graduated | Montreal Victoire |
| Maggie Nicholson | Defender | Graduated | |
| Lauren O'Hara | Forward | Sophomore | Vermont |
| Krista Parkkonen | Defender | Senior | Minnesota Duluth |
| Ayla Puppe | Forward | Sophomore | Minnesota State |
| Audrey Wethington | Forward | Graduated | |
| Skylar Vetter | Goaltender | Graduated | |

=== Players drafted ===
Professional Women's Hockey League
| Round | Player | Position | Team |
|---|---|---|---|
| 2 | Ella Huber | F | Boston Fleet |
| 2 | Natálie Mlýnková | F | Montreal Victoire |
| 4 | Peyton Hemp | F | Ottawa Charge |

=== Recruiting ===
Players who joined the Gophers since last season
| Player | Position | Nationality | Notes |
|---|---|---|---|
| Sydney Bailey | Defender | United States | Rogers High School |
| Sienna D'Alessandro | Forward | Canada | John Abbott College; Canada U-18 Women's National Team |
| Bella Fanale | Forward | United States | Bishop Kearney High School; USA U-18 Women's National Team |
| Layla Hemp | Goaltender | United States | Minnetonka High School; USA U-18 Women's National Team |
| Avery Hovland | Forward | United States | North American Hockey Academy |
| Molly Jordan | Defender | United States | Transfer from Boston College |
| Jamie Nelson | Forward | United States | Transfer from Minnesota State |
| Sarah Paul | Forward | Canada | Transfer from Princeton |
| Tereza Plosová | Forward | Czech Republic | Djurgårdens IF; Czech Republic National Team |

== Roster ==
As of September 6, 2025

| No. | Nat. | Player | Class | Pos | Height | DoB | Hometown | Previous team |
|---|---|---|---|---|---|---|---|---|
| 1 | (United States) | Layla Hemp | Freshman | G | 5' 7" (1.7 m) | 2006-07-05 | Chanhassen, Minnesota | Minnetonka High School |
| 3 | (United States) | Olivia Kortan | Freshman | F | 5' 4" (1.63 m) | 2006-11-29 | Moorhead, Minnesota | Moorhead High School |
| 5 | (United States) | Sydney Bailey | Freshman | D | 5' 7" (1.7 m) | 2007-05-26 | Rogers, Minnesota | Rogers High School |
| 6 | (United States) | Molly Jordan | Junior | D | 5' 6" (1.68 m) | 2005-02-18 | Berlin, Connecticut | Boston College (HEA) |
| 7 | (Finland) | Nelli Laitinen (C) | Senior | D | 5' 7" (1.7 m) | 2002-04-29 | Lohja, Finland | Kiekko-Espoo |
| 8 | (Canada) | Chloe Primerano | Sophomore | D | 5' 8" (1.73 m) | 2007-01-02 | North Vancouver, British Columbia | RINK-Kelowna |
| 9 | (United States) | Ava Lindsay | Junior | F | 5' 6" (1.68 m) | 2005-02-20 | Minnetonka, Minnesota | Minnetonka High School |
| 10 | (United States) | Jamie Nelson | Graduate | F | 5' 8" (1.73 m) | 2002-06-13 | Andover, Minnesota | Minnesota State (WCHA) |
| 11 | (Sweden) | Josefin Bouveng | Senior | F | 5' 9" (1.75 m) | 2001-05-15 | Vassunda, Sweden | Brynäs IF |
| 12 | (United States) | Avery Hovland | Freshman | F | | | West Fargo, North Dakota | North American Hockey Academy |
| 13 | (Hungary) | Emma Kreisz | Junior | F | 5' 9" (1.75 m) | 2003-09-02 | Budapest, Hungary | Stanstead College |
| 14 | (Canada) | Sienna D'Alessandro | Freshman | F | 5' 7" (1.7 m) | 2006-01-05 | Pointe-Claire, Quebec | John Abbott College |
| 16 | (United States) | Allie Franco | Senior | F | 5' 7" (1.7 m) | 2004-01-27 | Oakdale, Minnesota | Hill-Murray School |
| 17 | (United States) | Kendra Distad | Sophomore | F | 5' 6" (1.68 m) | 2006-02-25 | Burnsville, Minnesota | Minnetonka High School |
| 18 | (United States) | Abbey Murphy (C) | Graduate (RS) | F | 5' 5" (1.65 m) | 2002-04-14 | Evergreen Park, Illinois | Chicago Mission |
| 19 | (Canada) | Sarah Paul | Senior (RS) | F | 5' 8" (1.73 m) | 2003-07-20 | Kelowna, British Columbia | Princeton (ECAC) |
| 22 | (Czech Republic) | Tereza Plosová | Freshman | F | 5' 10" (1.78 m) | 2006-07-05 | Liberec, Czech Republic | Djurgårdens IF (SDHL) |
| 24 | (United States) | Carly Humphrey | Sophomore | D | 5' 7" (1.7 m) | 2006-03-03 | Elk River, Minnesota | Elk River High School |
| 29 | (United States) | Madison Kaiser | Senior | F | 5' 7" (1.7 m) | 2004-07-10 | Ham Lake, Minnesota | Holy Family Catholic High School |
| 32 | (United States) | Sydney Morrow | Senior | D | 5' 7" (1.7 m) | 2004-04-12 | Darien, Connecticut | Shattuck-Saint Mary's |
| 35 | (United States) | Sophia Johnson | Senior | G | 5' 8" (1.73 m) | 2004-04-16 | Minnetonka, Minnesota | Minnetonka High School |
| 47 | (Canada) | Gracie Graham | Sophomore | D | 5' 10" (1.78 m) | 2006-01-09 | Kelowna, British Columbia | RINK-Kelowna |
| 56 | (Canada) | Hannah Clark | Sophomore | G | 5' 9" (1.75 m) | 2006-05-12 | Oshawa, Ontario | Etobicoke Dolphins |
| 97 | (United States) | Bella Fanale | Freshman | F | 5' 5" (1.65 m) | 2007-05-19 | Webster, New York | Bishop Kearney Selects |

== Standings ==
2025–26 Western Collegiate Hockey Association standings
| | Conference | | | | | | | | | | Overall | | | | | |
| | GP | W | L | T | OTW | OTL | SOW | PTS | GF | GA | GP | W | L | T | GF | GA |
|---|---|---|---|---|---|---|---|---|---|---|---|---|---|---|---|---|
| #1 Wisconsin † | 28 | 23 | 3 | 2 | 1 | 1 | 1 | 72 | 138 | 45 | 41 | 35 | 4 | 2 | 213 | 60 |
| #2 Ohio State * | 28 | 24 | 4 | 0 | 2 | 0 | 0 | 70 | 117 | 50 | 41 | 36 | 5 | 0 | 181 | 66 |
| #5 Minnesota | 28 | 18 | 9 | 1 | 1 | 2 | 1 | 57 | 115 | 70 | 39 | 26 | 12 | 1 | 173 | 86 |
| #10 Minnesota Duluth | 28 | 15 | 10 | 3 | 2 | 0 | 2 | 48 | 69 | 59 | 38 | 20 | 15 | 3 | 93 | 76 |
| #13 Minnesota State | 28 | 9 | 17 | 2 | 2 | 1 | 1 | 29 | 55 | 95 | 38 | 17 | 19 | 2 | 86 | 113 |
| St. Cloud State | 28 | 7 | 19 | 2 | 1 | 4 | 1 | 27 | 74 | 103 | 37 | 12 | 23 | 2 | 83 | 120 |
| St. Thomas | 28 | 7 | 20 | 1 | 3 | 5 | 0 | 24 | 49 | 95 | 36 | 12 | 23 | 1 | 81 | 117 |
| Bemidji State | 28 | 3 | 24 | 1 | 1 | 0 | 0 | 9 | 38 | 138 | 36 | 6 | 27 | 3 | 58 | 161 |
Championship: March 7, 2026 † indicates conference regular season champion; * indicates conference tournament champion Rankings: USCHO.com; updated March 23, 2026

== Regular season ==
=== Schedule ===
| Date | Time | Opponent^{#} | Rank^{#} | Site | Decision | Result | Attendance | Record | Ref |
Regular season
| September 25 | 6:00 | Boston College* | #3 | Ridder Arena • Minneapolis, MN | Clark | W 7–1 | 1133 | 1–0–0 | |
| September 26 | 6:00 | Boston College* | #3 | Ridder Arena • Minneapolis, MN | Hemp | W 11–0 | 1721 | 2–0–0 | |
| October 3 | 5:00 | at #13 Boston University* | #3 | Walter Brown Arena • Boston, MA | Clark | W 5–0 | 803 | 3–0–0 | |
| October 4 | 3:00 | at #13 Boston University* | #3 | Walter Brown Arena • Boston, MA | Hemp | W 5–2 | 707 | 4–0–0 | |
| October 10 | 5:30 | #10 St. Cloud State | #3 | Ridder Arena • Minneapolis, MN | Clark | W 4–1 | 1506 | 5–0–0 (1–0–0) | |
| October 11 | 1:00 | at #10 St. Cloud State | #3 | Herb Brooks National Hockey Center • St. Cloud, MN | Clark | W 5–3 | 523 | 6–0–0 (2–0–0) | |
| October 18 | 2:00 | #2 Ohio State | #3 | Ridder Arena • Minneapolis, MN | Clark | L 1–4 | 2880 | 6–1–0 (2–1–0) | |
| October 19 | 2:00 | #2 Ohio State | #3 | Ridder Arena • Minneapolis, MN | Clark | W 6–3 | 1642 | 7–1–0 (3–1–0) | |
| October 24 | 6:02 | at #4 Minnesota Duluth | #3 | AMSOIL Arena • Duluth, MN | Clark | W 4–0 | 981 | 8–1–0 (4–1–0) | |
| October 25 | 3:02 | at #4 Minnesota Duluth | #3 | AMSOIL Arena • Duluth, MN | Clark | W 3–2 | 1075 | 9–1–0 (5–1–0) | |
| October 31 | 6:00 | at #1 Wisconsin | #3 | LaBahn Arena • Madison, WI | Clark | W 5–1 | 2273 | 10–1–0 (6–1–0) | |
| November 1 | 2:00 | at #1 Wisconsin | #3 | LaBahn Arena • Madison, WI | Clark | L 2–7 | 2273 | 10–2–0 (6–2–0) | |
| November 14 | 12:00 | Bemidji State | #2 | 3M Arena at Mariucci • Minneapolis, MN | Clark | W 6–2 | 5218 | 11–2–0 (7–2–0) | |
| November 15 | 2:00 | Bemidji State | #2 | Ridder Arena • Minneapolis, MN | Hemp | W 9–2 | 1683 | 12–2–0 (8–2–0) | |
| November 21 | 6:00 | Minnesota State | #2 | Ridder Arena • Minneapolis, MN | Clark | L 1–3 | 2201 | 12–3–0 (8–3–0) | |
| November 22 | 2:00 | at Minnesota State | #2 | Mayo Clinic Health System Event Center • Mankato, MN | Hemp | L 1–4 | 363 | 12–4–0 (8–4–0) | |
| December 5 | 2:00 | at St. Thomas | #3 | Lee & Penny Anderson Arena • St. Paul, MN | Clark | W 5–3 | 751 | 13–4–0 (9–4–0) | |
| December 6 | 2:00 | St. Thomas | #3 | Ridder Arena • Minneapolis, MN | Hemp | W 4–1 | 2238 | 14–4–0 (10–4–0) | |
| January 2 | 4:00 | at Sacred Heart* | #3 | Martire Family Arena • Fairfield, CT | Clark | W 4–0 | 454 | 15–4–0 (10–4–0) | |
| January 3 | 12:00 | at Sacred Heart* | #3 | Martire Family Arena • Fairfield, CT | Clark | W 14–2 | 356 | 16–4–0 (10–4–0) | |
| January 9 | 6:00 | at #12 Minnesota State | #3 | Mayo Clinic Health System Event Center • Mankato, MN | Clark | W 11–3 | 324 | 17–4–0 (11–4–0) | |
| January 10 | 7:30 | #12 Minnesota State | #3 | Ridder Arena • Minneapolis, MN | Hemp | W 4–3 | 1940 | 18–4–0 (12–4–0) | |
| January 16 | 7:02 | at Bemidji State | #3 | Sanford Center • Bemidji, MN | Clark | W 5–3 | 412 | 19–4–0 (13–4–0) | |
| January 17 | 3:32 | at Bemidji State | #3 | Sanford Center • Bemidji, MN | Hemp | W 11–1 | 809 | 20–4–0 (14–4–0) | |
| January 23 | 6:00 | at #15 St. Cloud State | #3 | Herb Brooks National Hockey Center • St. Cloud, MN | Clark | W 8–1 | 534 | 21–4–0 (15–4–0) | |
| January 24 | 2:00 | #15 St. Cloud State | #3 | Ridder Arena • Minneapolis, MN | Hemp | W 5–1 | 1357 | 22–4–0 (16–4–0) | |
| January 30 | 6:00 | #1 Wisconsin | #3 | Ridder Arena • Minneapolis, MN | Clark | W 3–2 ^{OT} | 2,994 | 23–4–0 (17–4–0) | |
| January 31 | 2:00 | #1 Wisconsin | #3 | Ridder Arena • Minneapolis, MN | Clark | L 1–6 | 3,159 | 23–5–0 (17–5–0) | |
| February 6 | 12:00 | at St. Thomas | #3 | Ridder Arena • Minneapolis, MN | Clark | W 4–1 | 1,007 | 24–5–0 (18–5–0) | |
| February 7 | 2:00 | St. Thomas | #3 | Lee and Penny Anderson Arena • St. Paul, MN | Clark | T 1–1 ^{SOW} | 1,802 | 24–5–1 (18–5–1) | |
| February 13 | 5:00 | at #2 Ohio State | #3 | Ohio State University Ice Rink • Columbus, OH | Clark | L 2–4 | 707 | 24–6–1 (18–6–1) | |
| February 14 | 3:00 | at #2 Ohio State | #3 | Ohio State University Ice Rink • Columbus, OH | Clark | L 1–3 | 730 | 24–7–1 (18–7–1) | |
| February 20 | 6:00 | #10 Minnesota Duluth | #3 | Ridder Arena • Minneapolis, MN | tbd | L 2–3 ^{OT} | 1862 | 24–8–1 (18–8–1) | |
| February 21 | 2:00 | #10 Minnesota Duluth | #3 | Ridder Arena • Minneapolis, MN | Hemp | L 1–2 ^{OT} | 2315 | 24–9–1 (18–9–1) | |
*Non-conference game. ^{#}Rankings from USCHO.com Poll.

=== WCHA tournament ===
The Minnesota Golden Gophers women's ice hockey team earned the third seed in the 2026 WCHA tournament based on their 18–9–1 conference record, This seed earned them the right to play the sixth-seeded St. Cloud State team at home in Ridder Arena in a best-of-three series to open the WCHA tournament.

| Date | Time | Opponent^{#} | Rank^{#} | Site | Decision | Result | Attendance | Record | Ref |
WCHA Tournament
| February 27 | 6:00 | St. Cloud State* | #4 | Ridder Arena • Minneapolis, MN (WCHA First Round, Game 1) | Clark | L 0–1 ^{OT} | 1353 | 24–10–1 | |
| February 28 | 2:00 | St. Cloud State* | #4 | Ridder Arena • Minneapolis, MN (WCHA First Round, Game 2) | Clark | W 4–1 | 1408 | 25–10–1 | |
| March 1 | 3:00 | St. Cloud State* | #4 | Ridder Arena • Minneapolis, MN (WCHA First Round, Game 3) | Clark | W 6–1 | 1313 | 26–10–1 | |
| March 5 | 7:30 | vs. #2 Ohio State* | #4 | Lee & Penny Anderson Arena • St. Paul, MN (WCHA Final Faceoff, Semifinals) | Clark | L 0–4 | 1687 | 26–11–1 | |
*Non-conference game. ^{#}Rankings from USCHO.com Poll.

=== NCAA tournament ===
The Minnesota Golden Gophers had a 26–11–1 overall record through the regular season and WCHA tournament, and earned the fourth overall seed in the 2026 NCAA Division I women's ice hockey tournament. By virtue of holding the fourth seed, the Gophers did not need to play in the first round of the tournament; instead they advanced straight to the quarterfinals of the 11-team single-elimination tournament, hosting fifth-seeded Northeastern at Ridder Arena on March 14, 2026. Minnesota fell behind Northeastern 3–0 in the first period. After the third Huskies goal, starting goaltender Hannah Clark was pulled in favor of Layla Hemp. The Huskies added another in the second period, leading 4–0 after the second period. Abbey Murphy netted a pair of goals for the Gophers in the third, but it wasn't enough, as the Huskies prevailed, 4–2.

As of March 14, 2026

| Date | Time | Opponent^{#} | Rank^{#} | Site | Decision | Result | Attendance | Record | Ref |
NCAA Tournament
| March 14 | 2:00 | #5 Northeastern* | #4 | Ridder Arena • Minneapolis, MN (NCAA Regional Final) | Clark | L 2–4 | 1,482 | 26–12–1 | |
*Non-conference game. ^{#}Rankings from USCHO.com Poll.

== Scoring statistics ==
Regular season
| Name | Position | Games | Goals | Assists | Points | PIM |
|---|---|---|---|---|---|---|
| Abbey Murphy | F | 18 | 20 | 14 | 34 | 45 |
| Josefin Bouveng | F | 18 | 10 | 14 | 24 | 8 |
| Ava Lindsay | F | 17 | 5 | 8 | 23 | 4 |
| Sydney Morrow | D | 18 | 6 | 12 | 18 | 12 |
| Jamie Nelson | F | 18 | 5 | 12 | 17 | 2 |
| Nelli Laitinen | D | 18 | 5 | 11 | 16 | 2 |
| Bella Fanale | F | 18 | 7 | 8 | 15 | 9 |
| Madison Kaiser | F | 18 | 4 | 11 | 15 | 16 |
| Emma Kreisz | F | 18 | 4 | 8 | 12 | 10 |
| Tereza Plosová | F | 18 | 5 | 4 | 9 | 4 |
| Chloe Primerano | D | 13 | 3 | 6 | 9 | 18 |
| Sarah Paul | F | 8 | 3 | 5 | 8 | 2 |
| Molly Jordan | D | 18 | 2 | 5 | 7 | 4 |
| Sienna D'Alessandro | F | 18 | 1 | 6 | 7 | 2 |
| Gracie Graham | D | 17 | 0 | 7 | 7 | 22 |
| Kendra Distad | F | 18 | 2 | 1 | 3 | 0 |
| Sydney Bailey | D | 9 | 1 | 0 | 1 | 0 |
| Allie Franco | F | 18 | 1 | 0 | 1 | 6 |
| Avery Hovland | F | 14 | 0 | 1 | 1 | 0 |
| Carly Humphrey | D | 18 | 0 | 1 | 1 | 2 |
| Olivia Kortan | F | 6 | 0 | 0 | 0 | 0 |
| Total | | 18 | 84 | 144 | 228 | 172 |

== Goaltending statistics ==
Regular season
| Name | Games | Minutes | Wins | Losses | Ties | Goals against | Saves | Shut outs | SV % | GAA |
|---|---|---|---|---|---|---|---|---|---|---|
| Hannah Clark | 13 | 724:47 | 10 | 3 | 0 | 24 | 315 | 2 | .929 | 1.99 |
| Layla Hemp | 7 | 348:16 | 4 | 1 | 0 | 12 | 116 | 1 | .906 | 2.07 |
| Sophia Johnson | 1 | 2:53 | 0 | 0 | 0 | 0 | 0 | 0 | .000 | .00 |
| Total | 21 | 1080:00 | 14 | 4 | 0 | 39 | 431 | 3 | .911 | 2.17 |

== Awards and honors ==
- Abbey Murphy was named WCHA Forward of the Week for the week of September 29, 2025.
- Sydney Morrow was named WCHA Defender of the Week for the week of September 29, 2025.
- Bella Fanale was named WCHA Rookie of the Week for the week of September 29, 2025.
- Murphy was named WCHA Forward of the Month for the month of September.
- Morrow was named WCHA Defender of the Month for the month of September.
- Fanale was named WCHA Rookie of the Month for the month of September.
- Murphy was named WCHA Forward of the Week for the week of October 6, 2025.
- Hannah Clark was named WCHA Goaltender of the Week for the week of October 13, 2025.
- Hannah Clark was named WCHA Goaltender of the Week for the week of October 27, 2025.
- Jamie Nelson was named WCHA Forward of the week for the week of December 8, 2025.
- Jamie Nelson was named WCHA Forward of the Month for December 2025.

== Rankings ==
| Poll | Week | | | | | | | | | | | | | | | | | | | | | | | | | |
| Poll | Pre | 1 | 2 | 3 | 4 | 5 | 6 | 7 | 8 | 9 | 10 | 11 | 12 | 13 | 14 | 15 | 16 | 17 | 18 | 19 | 20 | 21 | 22 | 23 | 24 | Final |
|---|---|---|---|---|---|---|---|---|---|---|---|---|---|---|---|---|---|---|---|---|---|---|---|---|---|---|
| USCHO | 3 | – | 3 | 3 | 3 | 3 | 3 | 2 | 2 | 2 | 3 | 3 | 3 | 3 | 3 | 3 | 3 | 3 | 3 | 3 | 4 | 4 | | – | | |
| USA Hockey | 3 | 3 | 3 | 3 | 3 | 3 | 3 | 2 | 2 | 2 | 3 | 3 | 3 | 3 | 3 | 3 | 3 | 3 | 3 | 3 | 3 | 4 | 4 | | | |

=== Notes ===
1.USCHO publishes Preseason, 21 weeks of in-season rankings, and a Final ranking.
2.USA Hockey publishes Preseason, 24 weeks of in-season rankings, and a Final ranking.

== Milestones ==
Regular season
| September 25, 2025 | Bella Fanale | First collegiate goal |
| September 25, 2025 | Kendra Distad | First collegiate goal |
| September 25, 2025 | Molly Jordan | First goal with Minnesota |
| September 26, 2025 | Abbey Murphy | 200th career point |
| September 26, 2025 | Josefin Bouveng | 100th career point |
| September 26, 2025 | Tereza Plosová | First collegiate goal |
| September 26, 2025 | Layla Hemp | First collegiate start |
| September 26, 2025 | Layla Hemp | First collegiate shutout |
| October 19, 2025 | Jamie Nelson | First goal with Minnesota |
| October 31, 2025 | Abbey Murphy | 100th career assist |
| October 31, 2025 | Sienna D'Alessandro | First collegiate goal |
| November 15, 2025 | Sydney Bailey | First collegiate goal |
| November 15, 2025 | Avery Hovland | First collegiate point |
| December 5, 2025 | Josefin Bouveng | 50th career point |
| December 6, 2025 | Abbey Murphy | 26th career game-winning goal (program record) |
| January 3, 2026 | Abbey Murphy | Career-high 7 points, tying program record |
| January 3, 2026 | Nelli Laitinen | 1st career hat trick |
| January 9, 2026 | Avery Hovland | 1st career goal |
| January 10, 2026 | Abbey Murphy | 50th point of the season |
| January 17, 2026 | Abbey Murphy | 5th hat trick of the season |
| January 17, 2026 | Abbey Murphy | 30th goal of the season |
| January 17, 2026 | Ava Lindsay | 1st hat trick of career |
| January 23, 2026 | Jamie Nelson | 1st career hat trick |
| January 23, 2026 | Jamie Nelson | 50th career goal |
| January 23, 2026 | Sydney Morrow | 100th career point |
| January 24, 2026 | Abbey Murphy | T-1st place all-time Gopher goals record (139) |
| January 24, 2026 | Brad Frost | 550th career win |
| February 28, 2026 | Abbey Murphy | 1st place all-time Gopher goals record (141) |
| February 28, 2026 | Chloe Primerano | 10th goal of the season |
| March 1, 2026 | Gracie Graham | 1st goal of the season |
