= Minnesota Golden Gophers women's ice hockey =

- Current season
- University: University of Minnesota
- Conference: WCHA
- Head coach: Greg May; 1st season, 0–0–0
- Arena: Ridder Arena; Minneapolis
- Colors: Maroon and gold
- Fight song: Minnesota Rouser

AWCHA tournament champions
- 2000

NCAA tournament champions
- 2004, 2005, 2012, 2013, 2015, 2016

NCAA tournament runner-up
- 2006, 2014, 2019

NCAA tournament Frozen Four
- 2002, 2003, 2004, 2005, 2006, 2009, 2010, 2012, 2013, 2014, 2015, 2016, 2017, 2019, 2023, 2025

NCAA tournament appearances
- 2002, 2003, 2004, 2005, 2006, 2008, 2009, 2010, 2011, 2012, 2013, 2014, 2015, 2016, 2017, 2018, 2019, 2022, 2023, 2024, 2025, 2026

Conference tournament champions
- 2002, 2004, 2005, 2012, 2013, 2014, 2018, 2023

Conference regular season champions
- 2001, 2002, 2004, 2005, 2009, 2010, 2013, 2014, 2015, 2019, 2022

Current uniform
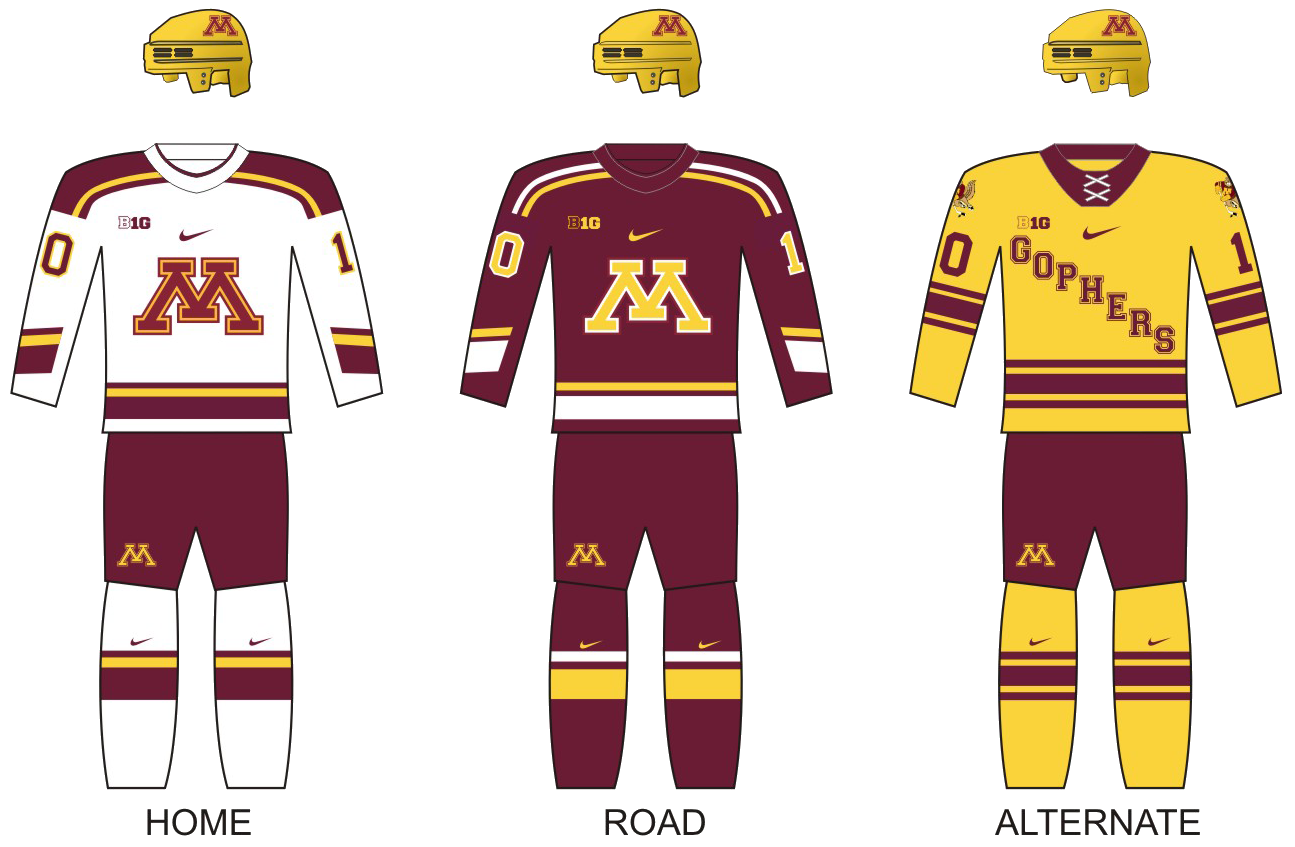

The Minnesota Golden Gophers women's ice hockey team plays for the University of Minnesota at the Twin Cities campus in Minneapolis. The team is one of the members of the Western Collegiate Hockey Association (WCHA) and competes in the National Collegiate Athletic Association (NCAA) in Division I. The Golden Gophers have won six NCAA Championships as well as the final American Women's College Hockey Alliance Championship. In the WCHA, they have also been regular season champions 11 times and tournament champions 8 times.

The team also holds the distinction of having the longest winning streak in women's or men's college hockey at 62 games from February 17, 2012, to November 17, 2013, winning back-to-back NCAA titles during the stretch. In 2004–2005, Minnesota won back-to-back NCAA Championships. Natalie Darwitz was a three-time All American, and three-time finalist for the Patty Kazmaier award. Darwitz left the program with the career scoring mark at Minnesota in three years and set two NCAA single-season record with 114 points (42 Goals, 72 Assists) and most assists in 40 games in her final season. Minnesota Gophers women's hockey players have won the Patty Kazmaier Award three times (Krissy Wendell [2005], Amanda Kessel [2013], and Taylor Heise [2022]), as well as having all three finalists in 2013.

In addition to their overall success as a competitive team, the Gophers have also been ranked in the nation's top two teams for attendance since becoming a varsity sport, and the team holds the second largest single-game attendance record for women's collegiate hockey, drawing 6,854 fans for the first Minnesota women's hockey game on November 2, 1997.

On March 22, 2026, Greg May was hired as the third head coach in program history.

== Coaches ==
The Gophers have had two head coaches to date: Laura Halldorson and Brad Frost. Halldorson was the head coach for eleven years, from the 1997–1998 season to the 2006–2007 season. Her overall coaching record was 278–67–22 with the Gophers, a winning percentage of .787. During that time, the Gophers won four of their WCHA championships and three of their national championships. They averaged 28 wins per season and appeared in eight out of ten national tournaments, reaching seven finals. The Gophers' experienced their best season under Halldorson in 2004–2005 with a 36–2–2 record.

In the 2007–08 season, Brad Frost became the temporary head coach. He had previously been an assistant coach. In his first year as head coach, Frost led the Gophers to a 21-game winning streak, with the season's record ending with 27 wins, 7 losses, and 4 ties but also ended with a conference record of 21–5–2, which ranked second in the WCHA. The Gophers made another NCAA regional appearance and post-season Frost was awarded WCHA Coach of the Year. In the 2008–2009 season, his temporary coaching status was lifted and he was named permanent head coach of the Gophers. That same season he led the Gophers to a record of 32–5–3 and to another WCHA championship. Frost then coached the Gophers into back-to-back NCAA Frozen Four championships in 2012 and 2013, which were encompassed in their 62-game winning streak, including a 41–0–0 record in 2012–13. The Golden Gophers have had a cross-state rivalry with the Minnesota Duluth Bulldogs. The Gophers handed the Bulldogs their first ever conference loss 4–3 in a sold-out game at Pioneer Hall on February 11, 2000.

== Team history ==
Minnesota put its first women's team on the ice in 1997–98. Nadine Muzerall, a Canadian who graduated from Kimball Union Academy in Meriden, New Hampshire, was among its initial recruits.

During the 2004–05 season, Krissy Wendell set an NCAA record (since tied) for most shorthanded goals in one season with 7. After graduating from Minnesota, she had the career record for most shorthanded goals in a career with 16. Both marks have since been tied by Meghan Agosta.

In 2009–10, Noora Räty was just the second freshman to be a finalist for the Patty Kazmaier Memorial Award. Räty led the NCAA in several goaltending categories. She led the NCAA in goals-against average (1.24), save percentage (.951) and shutouts (7), while ranking third in winning percentage (.792). Her won loss record for the year was 17–3–4. In addition, Räty was the WCHA goaltending champion and earned numerous honours including All-WCHA First Team and All-WCHA Rookie Team. During the season, she was named the WCHA Defensive Player of the Week four times and WCHA Rookie of the Week on two occasions. She set a school record for most assists in one season by a goaltender (3). Räty played on national championship teams in 2011–12 and 2012–13. The 2012–13 team finished 41–0–0, and the team won the last 49 games of Räty's career. Räty finished with both the career and single-season record for shutouts.

=== Minnesota Duluth rivalry ===
Minnesota Duluth, had been a traditional rival to the Gophers in men's hockey. In 1998, Minnesota Duluth announced that it was going to assemble a women's team for the 1999–2000 season. Duluth gave a three-year, $210,000 contract to Shannon Miller, who coached Canada to the 1998 Olympic final in Nagano. Miller recruited players from Canada, Finland and Sweden, including four Olympians. The rivalry was fuelled when Miller took two players from Minnesota: star forward Jenny Schmidgall, whose 93 points led the nation, and defenseman Brittny Ralph, who would serve as the Bulldogs' captain. In the 1999–2000 season, Duluth would lose just once to the Gophers in their first five meetings, which included a 2–0 Bulldogs victory in the final of the Western Collegiate Hockey Association tournament.

== Arenas ==
The Golden Gophers have called two ice rinks home. From their 1997–1998 season to their 2001–2002 season the Golden Gophers shared their home ice with the men's team at Mariucci Arena. The Golden Gophers moved into Ridder Arena in the 2002–2003 season, a facility dedicated solely to a women's hockey team, and named for team benefactors Robert Ridder and Kathleen Ridder.

== Year to Year ==
This is a partial list of the last five seasons completed by the Gophers. For the full season-by-season history, see List of Minnesota Golden Gophers women's ice hockey seasons.

=== Table key ===
Key of colors and symbols
| Color/symbol | Explanation |
|---|---|
| † | National champions |
| ‡ | Conference tournament champions |
| ↑ | Conference regular season champions |

Key of terms and abbreviations
| Term or abbreviation | Definition |
|---|---|
| W | Number of wins |
| L | Number of losses |
| T | Number of ties |
| OT | Number of losses in overtime (since the 1999–2000 season) |
| Finish | Final position in conference standings |
| Tournament | Results in conference tournament |

=== Yearly results ===
Last five year's list of Minnesota Golden Gophers women's ice hockey seasons
| Season | Coach | Overall | | | Conference | | | | | | Season Result | Ref |
| Season | Coach | W | L | T | | W | L | T | Finish | Tournament | Season Result | Ref |
|---|---|---|---|---|---|---|---|---|---|---|---|---|
| 2021–22 | Brad Frost | 29 | 9 | 1 | WCHA | 21 | 6 | 1 | 1st↑ | Won Quarterfinals vs. St. Thomas (4–0, 5–1); Won Semifinals vs. Minnesota-Duluth (5–1); Lost Championship vs. Ohio State (2–3 OT) | Lost Quarterfinals vs. Minnesota-Duluth (1–2) | |
| 2022–23 | Brad Frost | 30 | 6 | 3 | WCHA‡ | 22 | 3 | 3 | 2nd | Won Quarterfinals vs. St. Thomas (7–0, 6–2); Won Semifinals vs. Wisconsin (4–2); Won Championship vs. Ohio State (3–1)‡ | Won Semifinals vs. Minnesota-Duluth (3–0); Lost Frozen Four vs. Wisconsin (3–2 OT) | |
| 2023–24 | Brad Frost | 27 | 10 | 2 | WCHA | 19 | 7 | 2 | 3rd | Won Quarterfinals vs. Minnesota State (4–5, 7–1, 3–0); Lost Semifinals vs. Wisconsin (4–3 OT) | Lost Quarterfinals vs. Clarkson (2–3 4OT) | |
| 2024–25 | Brad Frost | 29 | 12 | 1 | WCHA | 19 | 8 | 1 | 3rd | Won Quarterfinals vs. Minnesota State (6–1, 4–5 (2OT), 6–2); Won Semifinals vs. Ohio State (6–2); Lost Championship vs. Wisconsin (3—4) | Won Quarterfinals vs. Clarkson (3–2); Lost Frozen Four vs. Wisconsin (2–6) | |
| 2025–26 | Brad Frost | 26 | 12 | 1 | WCHA | 18 | 9 | 1 | 3rd | Won Quarterfinals vs. St. Cloud State (0–1 (OT), 4–1, 6–1); Lost Semifinals vs. Ohio State (0–4) | Lost Quarterfinals vs. Northeastern (2–4) | |

== Championships ==
=== National ===
- 2000 – American Women's College Hockey Alliance championship
- 2004 – NCAA championship
- 2005 – NCAA championship
- 2012 – NCAA championship
- 2013 – NCAA championship
- 2015 – NCAA championship
- 2016 – NCAA championship

=== Conference ===
Western Collegiate Hockey Association Women's Regular Season Champions

- 2001, 2002, 2004, 2005, 2009, 2010, 2013, 2014, 2015, 2019, 2022

Western Collegiate Hockey Association Women's Tournament Champions

- 2002, 2004, 2005, 2012, 2013, 2014, 2018, 2023

== Current roster ==
As of July 22, 2026

| No. | Nat. | Player | Class | Pos | Height | DoB | Hometown | Previous team |
|---|---|---|---|---|---|---|---|---|
| 1 | (United States) | Layla Hemp | Sophomore | G | 5' 7" (1.7 m) | 2006-07-05 | Chanhassen, Minnesota | Minnetonka High School |
| 3 | (United States) | Olivia Kortan | Sophomore | F | 5' 4" (1.63 m) | 2006-11-29 | Moorhead, Minnesota | Moorhead High School |
| 4 | (United States) | Katya Sander | Freshman | D | 5' 9" (1.75 m) | 2008-03-04 | Chanhassen, Minnesota | Holy Family |
| 5 | (United States) | Sydney Bailey | Sophomore | D | 5' 7" (1.7 m) | 2007-05-26 | Rogers, Minnesota | Rogers High School |
| 6 | (United States) | Molly Jordan (A) | Senior | D | 5' 6" (1.68 m) | 2005-02-18 | Berlin, Connecticut | Boston College (HEA) |
| 8 | (Canada) | Chloe Primerano (A) | Junior | D | 5' 8" (1.73 m) | 2007-01-02 | North Vancouver, British Columbia | RINK-Kelowna |
| 9 | (United States) | Ava Lindsay (C) | Senior | F | 5' 6" (1.68 m) | 2005-02-20 | Minnetonka, Minnesota | Minnetonka High School |
| 11 | (Finland) | Julia Schalin | Junior | F | 5' 3" (1.6 m) | 2005-08-31 | Espoo, Finland | Mercyhurst (AHA) |
| 12 | (United States) | Avery Hovland | Sophomore | F | 5' 3" (1.6 m) | 2007-04-27 | West Fargo, North Dakota | North American Hockey Academy |
| 13 | (Hungary) | Emma Kreisz (A) | Senior | F | 5' 9" (1.75 m) | 2003-09-02 | Budapest, Hungary | Stanstead College |
| 14 | (Canada) | Sienna D'Alessandro | Sophomore | F | 5' 7" (1.7 m) | 2006-01-05 | Pointe-Claire, Quebec | John Abbott College |
| 17 | (United States) | Kendra Distad | Junior | F | 5' 6" (1.68 m) | 2006-02-25 | Burnsville, Minnesota | Minnetonka High School |
| 19 | (Canada) | Sarah Paul | Graduate (RS) | F | 5' 8" (1.73 m) | 2003-07-20 | Kelowna, British Columbia | Princeton (ECAC) |
| 20 | (United States) | Lauren Goldsworthy | Junior | D | 5' 8" (1.73 m) | 2006-05-19 | Minnetonka, Minnesota | Minnesota State (WCHA) |
| 22 | (Czech Republic) | Tereza Plosová | Sophomore | F | 5' 10" (1.78 m) | 2006-07-05 | Šimonovice, Czech Republic | Djurgårdens IF (SDHL) |
| 24 | (United States) | Carly Humphrey | Junior | D | 5' 7" (1.7 m) | 2006-03-03 | Elk River, Minnesota | Elk River High School |
| 29 | (United States) | Madison Kaiser (C) | Senior (RS) | F | 5' 7" (1.7 m) | 2004-07-10 | Ham Lake, Minnesota | Holy Family Catholic High School |
| 32 | (United States) | Payton Rolli | Freshman | G | 5' 8" (1.73 m) | 2008-06-05 | Warroad, Minnesota | Warroad High School |
| 43 | (Canada) | Adrianna Milani | Freshman | F | 5' 4" (1.63 m) | 2009-03-19 | Oakville, Ontario | Etobicoke Dolphins (OWHL) |
| 47 | (Canada) | Gracie Graham | Junior | D | 5' 10" (1.78 m) | 2006-01-09 | Kelowna, British Columbia | RINK-Kelowna |
| 53 | (United States) | Sloane Hartmetz | Freshman | D | 5' 3" (1.6 m) | 2008-02-08 | Phoenixville, Pennsylvania | Shattuck-Saint Mary's |
| 56 | (Canada) | Hannah Clark | Junior | G | 5' 9" (1.75 m) | 2006-05-12 | Oshawa, Ontario | Etobicoke Dolphins (OWHL) |
| 72 | (Canada) | Rachel Piggott | Freshman | F | 5' 3" (1.6 m) | 2008-05-10 | Richmond Hill, Ontario | Etobicoke Dolphins (OWHL) |
| 92 | (Canada) | Ashley Allard | Senior | F | 5' 7" (1.7 m) | 2005-07-29 | Ottawa, Ontario | UConn (HEA) |
| 93 | (Canada) | Maddie McCullough | Freshman | F | 5' 7" (1.7 m) | 2008-03-20 | Newmarket, Ontario | Etobicoke Dolphins (OWHL) |
| 97 | (United States) | Bella Fanale | Freshman | F | 5' 5" (1.65 m) | 2007-05-19 | Webster, New York | Bishop Kearney Selects |

== Captains ==
| Season | Captains |
|---|---|
| 1997–98 | Julie Otto, Kris Scholz |
| 1998–99 | Amber Hegland, Kris Scholz |
| 1999–00 | Shannon Kennedy, Kris Scholz |
| 2000–01 | Tracy Engstrom, Kris Scholz |
| 2001–02 | Tracy Engstrom, Laura Slominski |
| 2002–03 | Ronda Curtin, Kelsey Bills, Winny Brodt |
| 2003–04 | Kelsey Bills, La Toya Clarke |
| 2004–05 | Kelly Stephens, Krissy Wendell |
| 2005–06 | Andrea Nichols, Chelsey Brodt, Bobbi Ross |
| 2006–07 | Andrea Nichols, Bobbi Ross |
| 2007–08 | Bobbi Ross, Whitney Graft |
| 2008–09 | Melanie Gagnon, Gigi Marvin |
| 2009–10 | Michelle Maunu, Brittany Francis, Emily West, Terra Rasmussen |
| 2010–11 | Emily West, Terra Rasmussen, Sarah Erickson, Jen Schoullis, Anne Schleper |
| 2011–12 | Sarah Erickson, Jen Schoullis |
| 2012–13 | Megan Bozek, Bethany Brausen |
| 2013–14 | Bethany Brausen, Sarah Davis, Baylee Gillanders, Kelly Terry |
| 2014–15 | Rachel Ramsey, Rachael Bona, Meghan Lorence, Lee Stecklein |
| 2015–16 | Hannah Brandt, Lee Stecklein |
| 2016–17 | Lee Stecklein, Dani Cameranesi, Kate Schipper |
| 2017–18 | Sydney Baldwin, Cara Piazza |
| 2018–19 | Kelly Pannek |
| 2019–20 | Patti Marshall |
| 2020–21 | Emily Brown, Grace Zumwinkle |
| 2021–22 | Emily Brown, Olivia Knowles |
| 2022–23 | Abigail Boreen, Taylor Heise, Gracie Ostertag, Grace Zumwinkle |
| 2023–24 | Peyton Hemp |
| 2024–25 | Peyton Hemp, Abbey Murphy, Ella Huber, Nelli Laitinen |
| 2025–26 | Nelli Laitinen, Abbey Murphy |

== Olympians ==
Gopher players who have participated in the women's ice hockey tournament at the Winter Olympic Games
| Year | Country | Player | Result |
|---|---|---|---|
| 2002 | United States | Natalie Darwitz | Silver |
| 2002 | United States | Courtney Kennedy | Silver |
| 2002 | United States | Lyndsay Wall | Silver |
| 2002 | United States | Krissy Wendell | Silver |
| 2006 | United States | Natalie Darwitz | Bronze |
| 2006 | United States | Courtney Kennedy | Bronze |
| 2006 | United States | Kelly Stephens | Bronze |
| 2006 | United States | Lyndsay Wall | Bronze |
| 2006 | United States | Krissy Wendell (Captain) | Bronze |
| 2006 | Finland | Noora Räty | 4th |
| 2010 | United States | Natalie Darwitz | Silver |
| 2010 | United States | Gigi Marvin | Silver |
| 2010 | Finland | Noora Räty | Bronze |
| 2014 | United States | Megan Bozek | Silver |
| 2014 | United States | Amanda Kessel | Silver |
| 2014 | United States | Gigi Marvin | Silver |
| 2014 | United States | Anne Schleper | Silver |
| 2014 | United States | Lee Stecklein | Silver |
| 2014 | Finland | Mira Jalosuo | 5th |
| 2014 | Finland | Noora Räty | 5th |
| 2018 | United States | Hannah Brandt | Gold |
| 2018 | United States | Dani Cameranesi | Gold |
| 2018 | United States | Amanda Kessel | Gold |
| 2018 | United States | Gigi Marvin | Gold |
| 2018 | United States | Kelly Pannek | Gold |
| 2018 | United States | Lee Stecklein | Gold |
| 2018 | Finland | Mira Jalosuo | Bronze |
| 2018 | Finland | Noora Räty | Bronze |
| 2022 | United States | Megan Bozek | Silver |
| 2022 | United States | Hannah Brandt | Silver |
| 2022 | United States | Dani Cameranesi | Silver |
| 2022 | United States | Amanda Kessel | Silver |
| 2022 | United States | Abbey Murphy | Silver |
| 2022 | United States | Kelly Pannek | Silver |
| 2022 | United States | Lee Stecklein | Silver |
| 2022 | United States | Grace Zumwinkle | Silver |
| 2022 | Finland | Nelli Laitinen | Bronze |
| 2022 | Czech Republic | Natálie Mlýnková | 7th |
| 2022 | Sweden | Josefin Bouveng | 8th |
| 2026 | Czech Republic | Natálie Mlýnková | 5th |
| 2026 | Czech Republic | Tereza Plosová | 5th |
| 2026 | Finland | Nelli Laitinen | 6th |
| 2026 | Sweden | Josefin Bouveng | 4th |
| 2026 | United States | Taylor Heise | Gold |
| 2026 | United States | Abbey Murphy | Gold |
| 2026 | United States | Kelly Pannek | Gold |
| 2026 | United States | Lee Stecklein | Gold |
| 2026 | United States | Grace Zumwinkle | Gold |

== Golden Gophers in elite hockey leagues ==
Key of colors and symbols
| Color/symbol | Explanation |
|---|---|
| † | CWHL All-Star |
| ‡ | NWHL All-Star |
| ↑ | Clarkson Cup Champion |
| # | Isobel Cup Champion |
| § | Walter Cup Champion |

As of August 30, 2026

| Player | Pos. | Team(s) | League(s) | Years | Championship(s) |
|---|---|---|---|---|---|
| Sydney Baldwin | Defense | EHV Sabres Wien | EWHL | 2018–19 | |
| Sydney Baldwin | Defense | Minnesota Whitecaps | PHF | 2019–23 | |
| Lauren Bench | Goaltender | MoDo Hockey | SDHL | 2022–23 | |
| Lauren Bench | Goaltender | PWHL Minnesota | PWHL | 2023–24 | 1 (2024)§ |
| Lauren Bench | Goaltender | Djurgårdens IF | SDHL | 2025–26 | |
| Abby Boreen | Forward | PWHL Minnesota | PWHL | 2023–24 | 1 (2024)§ |
| Abby Boreen | Forward | Montreal Victoire | PWHL | 2024–25 | |
| Abby Boreen | Forward | Vancouver Goldeneyes | PWHL | 2025–26 | |
| Megan Bozek | Defense | Toronto Furies | CWHL | 2014–15 | |
| Megan Bozek | Defense | Buffalo Beauts | PHF | 2015–17 | 1 (2017# |
| Megan Bozek | Defense | Markham Thunder | CWHL | 2017–19 | 1 (2018)↑ |
| Megan Bozek | Defense | KRS Vanke Rays | ZhHL | 2019–21 | |
| Hannah Brandt | Forward | Minnesota Whitecaps | PHF | 2016–19 | 1 (2019)# |
| Hannah Brandt | Forward | Dream Gap Tour | PWHPA | 2019–23 | |
| Hannah Brandt | Forward | Boston Fleet | PWHL | 2023–26 | |
| Winny Brodt-Brown | Defense | Minnesota Whitecaps | WWHL | 2004–11 | 1 (2010)↑ |
| Winny Brodt-Brown | Defense | Minnesota Whitecaps | PHF | 2018–22 | 1 (2019)# |
| Chelsey Brodt-Rosenthal | Defense | Minnesota Whitecaps | WWHL | 2004–11 | 1 (2010)↑ |
| Chelsey Brodt-Rosenthal | Defense | Minnesota Whitecaps | PHF | 2018–22 | 1 (2019)# |
| Emily Brown | Defense | Dream Gap Tour | PWHPA | 2022–23 | |
| Emily Brown | Defense | Boston Fleet | PWHL | 2023–25 | |
| Emily Brown | Defense | Seattle Torrent | PWHL | 2025–present | |
| Jordyn Burns | Defense | Buffalo Beauts | PHF | 2017–19 | 1 (2017)# |
| Dani Cameranesi | Forward | Buffalo Beauts | PHF | 2018–19 | |
| Dani Cameranesi | Forward | Dream Gap Tour | PWHPA | 2019–21 | |
| Kelsey Cline | Forward/Defense | Minnesota Whitecaps | PHF | 2019–20 | |
| Sarah Davis | Forward | Calgary Inferno | CWHL | 2014–18 | 1 (2016)↑ |
| Taylor Heise | Forward | Minnesota Frost | PWHL | 2023–present | 2 (2024, 2025)§ |
| Peyton Hemp | Forward | Ottawa Charge | PWHL | 2025–26 | |
| Ella Huber | Forward | Boston Fleet | PWHL | 2025–26 | |
| Amanda Kessel‡ | Forward | Metropolitan Riveters | PHF | 2016–19 | |
| Amanda Kessel‡ | Forward | Dream Gap Tour | PWHPA | 2019–23 | |
| Olivia Knowles | Defense | Minnesota Whitecaps | PHF | 2022–23 | |
| Olivia Knowles | Defense | PWHL Toronto | PWHL | 2023–24 | |
| Olivia Knowles | Defense | New York Sirens | PWHL | 2024–present | |
| Monique Lamoureux | Forward | Boston Blades | CWHL | 2014–15 | 1 (2015)↑ |
| Monique Lamoureux | Forward | Minnesota Whitecaps | Independent | 2015–17 | |
| Monique Lamoureux | Forward | Dream Gap Tour | PWHPA | 2019–21 | |
| Amanda Leveille | Goaltender | Buffalo Beauts | PHF | 2016–18 | 1 (2017)# |
| Amanda Leveille | Goaltender | Minnesota Whitecaps | PHF | 2018–23 | 1 (2019)# |
| Amanda Leveille | Goaltender | PWHL Minnesota | PWHL | 2023–24 | 1 (2024)§ |
| Meghan Lorence | Forward | Minnesota Whitecaps | Independent/PHF | 2015–22 | |
| Patti Marshall | Defense | Brynäs IF | SDHL | 2020–21 | |
| Patti Marshall | Defense | Minnesota Whitecaps | PHF | 2021–23 | |
| Gigi Marvin | Defense | Minnesota Whitecaps | WWHL | 2010–11 | |
| Gigi Marvin | Defense | Boston Blades | CWHL | 2011–15 | 2 (2013, 2015)↑ |
| Gigi Marvin | Defense | Boston Pride | PHF | 2015–19 | 1 (2016)# |
| Gigi Marvin | Defense | Dream Gap Tour | PHWPA | 2019–22 | |
| Gigi Marvin | Defense | PWHL Boston | PWHL | 2023–24 | |
| Milica McMillen | Defense | Metropolitan Riveters | PHF | 2016–17 | |
| Natálie Mlýnková | Forward | Montreal Victoire | PWHL | 2025–26 | 1 (2026)§ |
| Savannah Norcross | Forward | PWHL New York | PWHL | 2023–24 | |
| Savannah Norcross | Forward | Luleä HF | SDHL | 2024–25 | |
| Savannah Norcross | Forward | New York Sirens | PWHL | 2025–26 | |
| Kelly Pannek | Forward | Dream Gap Tour | PWHPA | 2019–23 | |
| Kelly Pannek | Forward | Minnesota Frost | PWHL | 2023–present | 2 (2024, 2025)§ |
| Sarah Potomak | Forward | Dream Gap Tour | PWHPA | 2020–23 | |
| Noora Räty† | Goaltender | SKIF Nizhny Novgorod | ZhHL | 2013–14 | |
| Noora Räty† | Goaltender | Kiekko-Vantaa | Mestis | 2014–15 | |
| Noora Räty† | Goaltender | KJT | Suomi-sarja | 2015–16 | |
| Noora Räty† | Goaltender | Pyry | Suomi-sarja | 2016–17 | |
| Noora Räty† | Goaltender | Kunlun Red Star WIH | CWHL | 2017–18 | |
| Noora Räty† | Goaltender | KRS Vanke Rays | CWHL/ZhHL | 2018–22 | |
| Noora Räty† | Goaltender | HPK Kiekkonaiset | Naisten Liiga | 2021–23 | |
| Caitlin Reilly | Forward | EHV Sabres Wien | EWHL | 2018–20 | |
| Katie Robinson | Forward | TPS | Liiga | 2020–21 | |
| Allie Sanchez | Forward | Minnesota Whitecaps | WWHL | 2007–11 | 1 (2010) |
| Nicole Schammel | Forward | Minnesota Whitecaps | PHF | 2019–20, 2021–22 | |
| Nicole Schammel | Forward | Dream Gap Tour | PWHPA | 2020–21 | |
| Kate Schipper | Forward | Minnesota Whitecaps | PHF | 2018–19 | 1 (2019)# |
| Anne Schleper | Defense | Boston Blades | CWHL | 2012–13 | |
| Anne Schleper | Defense | Minnesota Whitecaps | Independent | 2015–16 | |
| Anne Schleper | Defense | Buffalo Beauts | PHF | 2016–17 | 1 (2017)# |
| Sydney Scobee | Goaltender | Dream Gap Tour | PWHPA | 2020–23 | |
| Lee Stecklein | Defense | Minnesota Whitecaps | PHF | 2018–19 | 1 (2019)# |
| Lee Stecklein | Defense | Dream Gap Tour | PWHPA | 2019–23 | |
| Lee Stecklein | Defense | Minnesota Frost | PWHL | 2023–present | 2 (2024, 2025)§ |
| Kelly Terry† | Forward | Toronto Furies | CWHL | 2014–17 | |
| Alex Woken | Forward | Mad Dogs Mannheim | Bundesliga | 2020–21 | |
| Alex Woken | Forward | Minnesota Whitecaps | PHF | 2021–22 | |
| Emily Zumwinkle | Defense | Seattle Torrent | PWHL | 2025–present | |
| Grace Zumwinkle | Forward | Minnesota Frost | PWHL | 2023–present | 2 (2024, 2025)§ |

== See also ==
- List of college women's ice hockey career coaching wins leaders (Brad Frost and Laura Halldorson both rank in the top 20 all-time)

| Preceded by Baylor Lady Bears basketball | Last NCAA team to finish the year undefeated or unbeaten in any sport March 24, 2013 | Succeeded by Connecticut Huskies women's basketball |
