= Zumwinkle =

Zumwinkle is a surname. Notable people with the surname include:

- Emily Zumwinkle (born 2003), American ice hockey player
- Grace Zumwinkle (born 1999), American ice hockey player
