= Breck School =

Prep school in Golden Valley, Minnesota, US

Location
- Golden Valley, Minnesota; USA; 44°58′52″N 93°20′35″W

Information
- Type: Private
- Motto: Perpetually learning
- Religious affiliation: Episcopal
- Established: 1886
- Head of School: Natalia Rico Hernández
- Faculty: 94.2 (on an FTE basis)
- Enrollment: 1,078 (2019–20)
- Average class size: 16
- Student to teacher ratio: 11.5:1
- Campus: 1 campus, suburban setting
- Colors: Navy and Gold
- Athletics: Independent Metro Athletic Conference (IMAC)
- Mascot: Mustang
- Namesake: James Lloyd Breck
- Website: breckschool.org

Breck School is an independent college-preparatory preK–12 school in Golden Valley, Minnesota, a suburb of Minneapolis. It was founded in 1886 and is affiliated with the Episcopal Church. The school includes a Lower School consisting of grades preschool through four, a Middle School consisting of grades five through eight, and an Upper School consisting of grades nine through twelve. Breck School is accredited by the National Association of Independent Schools.

== History ==
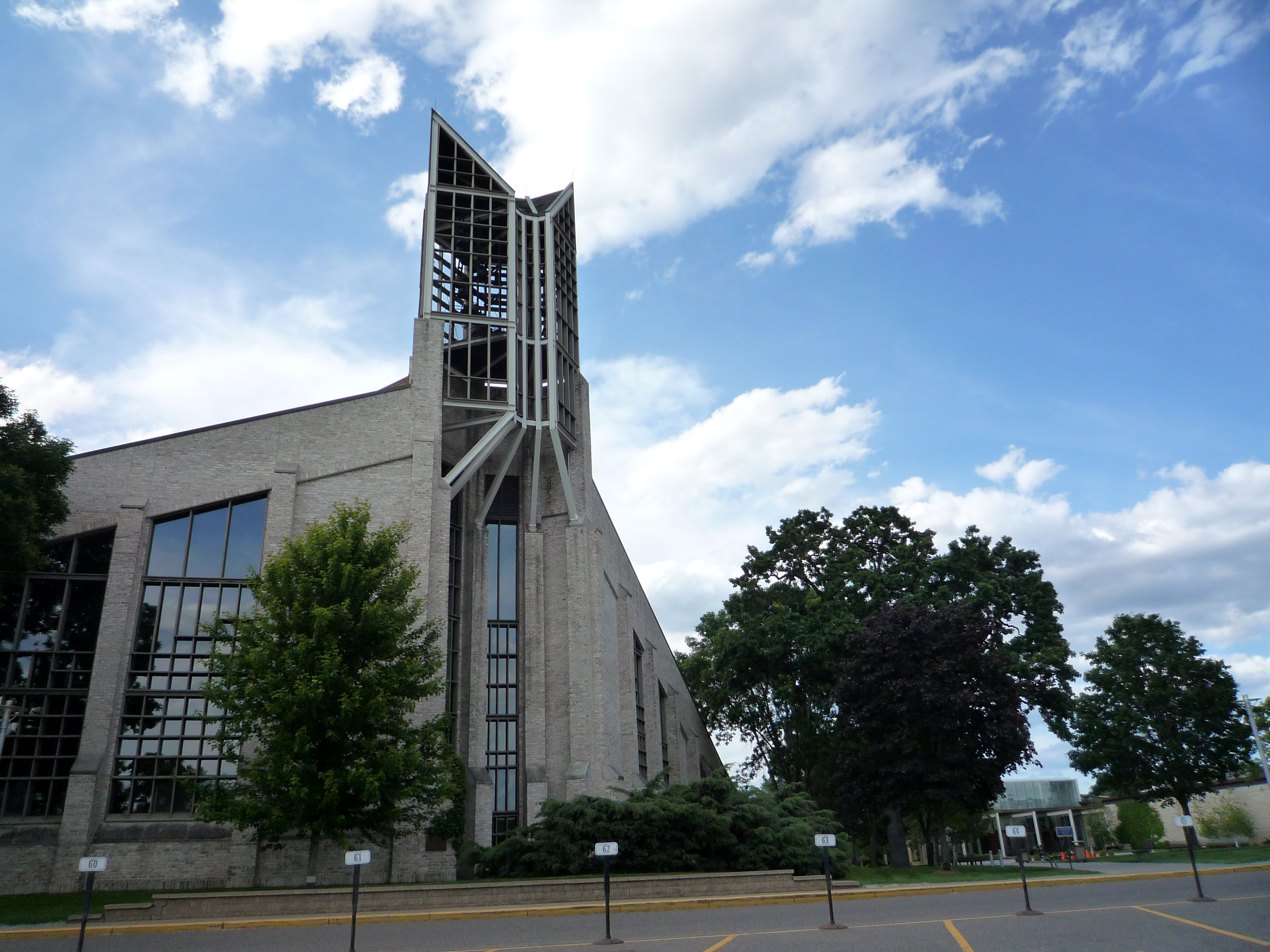
The Chapel of the Holy Spirit on the Breck School campus

Breck was established in 1886 in Wilder, Minnesota and named after Episcopal missionary the Rev. James Lloyd Breck. The school moved to 2095 Commonwealth Ave in Saint Paul under the direction of the Rev. Charles Haupt, in 1916. In 1920 it moved to 2102 Carter Ave., just a few blocks away in Saint Anthony Park. Then, in the fall of 1922 it moved a few more blocks west to Como and Hendon (now a part of the Luther Seminary). In 1938, the school became an exclusively boys' school, and military curriculum was added. This military aspect was eliminated in 1959. Girls were reintroduced in 1952 in grades one to three, and eventually throughout the school in 1967. A fire destroyed the original Chapel of the Holy Spirit at the school's River Road location in Minneapolis in 1979. In 1981, the school moved to its present location in Golden Valley at the campus of that city's former middle and high school, which were closed after a school district merger. Breck celebrated its centennial in 1986. That same year, John C. Littleford was succeeded by interim headmaster Kathryn C. Harper. Sam Salas served as headmaster from 1987 until retiring in June 2007. Edward Kim succeeded Salas as Head of School in July 2007. In January 2017, Natalia Rico Hernández was named 16th Head of School, beginning her tenure in July 2017.

=== Language programs ===
Breck School has an established language program. Breck's language programs, including Spanish, French, and Mandarin, extend from preschool to 12th grade. The Mandarin Chinese program was created by Margaret Wong.

== Community involvement ==
=== 2008 U.S. Senate debate ===
On Saturday, October 11, 2008, Breck hosted the second debate between U.S. Senate candidates Republican Norm Coleman, Democrat Al Franken, and Independence Party candidate Dean Barkley. The debate was aired locally on KARE-11 TV and nationally on C-SPAN. Several hundred local community members watched the debate live inside the Breck Cargill Theater and more than 200,000 Minnesotans watched the debate on television. A popular topic of the debate was regarding Moira Southern's award winning genetics project.

== Athletics ==
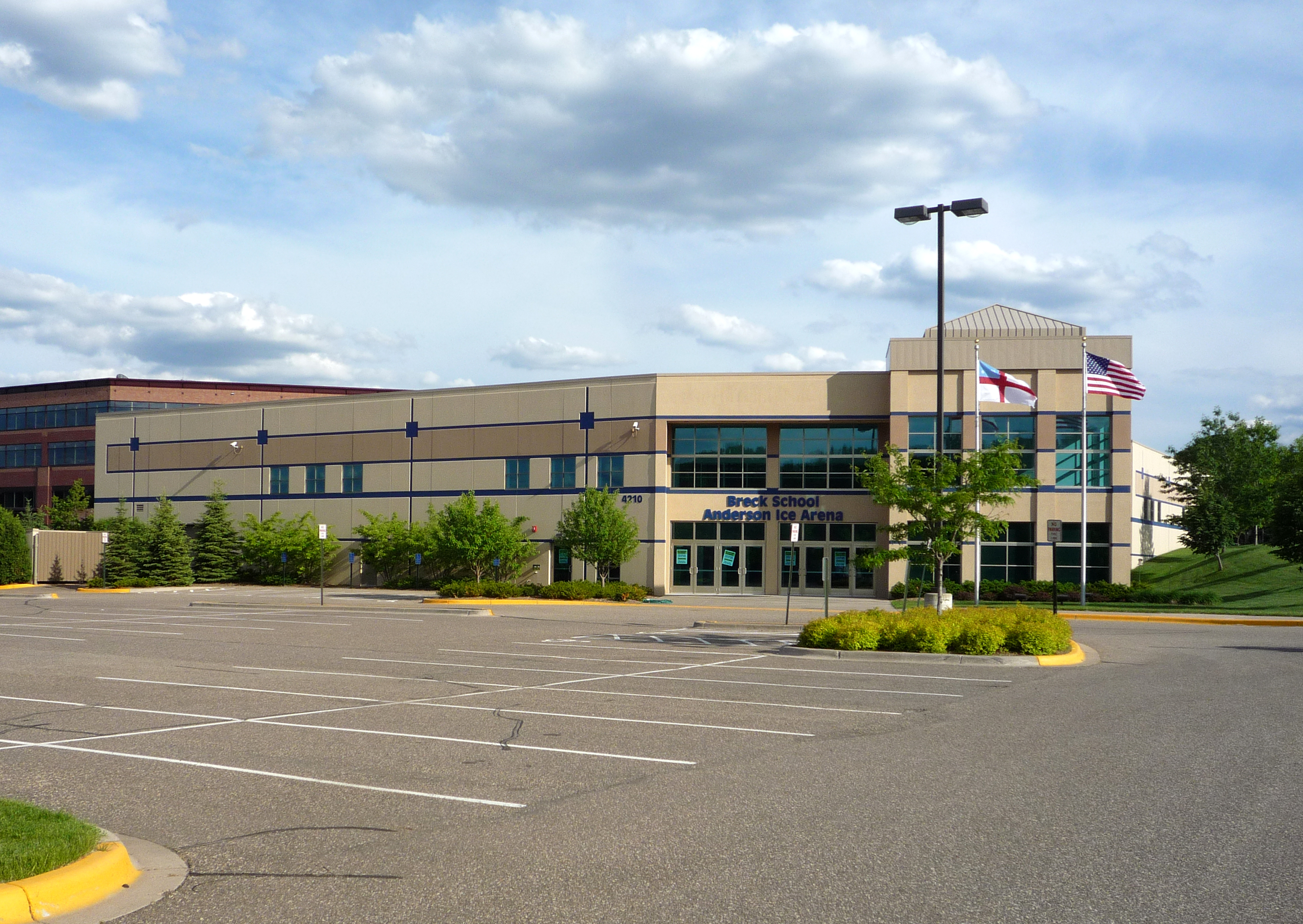
The Breck School Anderson Ice Arena is located a short distance north of campus and hosts Varsity and JV teams for both boys and girls hockey. During the off-season, it is open for non-school events.

Breck School is part of the Independent Metro Athletic Conference in the Minnesota State High School League and has won 35 state championship titles in 11 sports. Several players from the hockey and football programs have gone on to play for Division One programs. The boys hockey team won the state championship in 2000, 2004, 2009 and 2010. The girls' hockey program was established in 1994 and won the state championship in 2012, 2018, 2019, 2020, and 2026.

David Roddy was a three-sport athlete at Breck School, and was named the 2019 Minnesota Male High School Athlete of the Year for his performance in basketball, football, and track and field. As a senior, in basketball he averaged 29.7 points (second in the state) and 16.6 rebounds per game. He was an all-state quarterback in football. In the 2019 Minnesota state championship, he came in second place in the shotput, and won the discus Minnesota state title by nearly four feet. He later played in the NBA, and now plays for Hapoel Jerusalem of the Israeli Basketball Premier League.

Season	Sport	State championships	Year(s)
Fall	(B) Cross country	0	
Fall	(G) Cross country	0	
Fall	(B) Football	2	1996, 2003
Fall	(B) Soccer	1	2005
Fall	(G) Soccer	1	2026
Fall	(G) Swimming and Diving	0	
Fall	(G) Tennis	4	1996, 2013, 2021, 2026
Fall	(G) Volleyball	0	
Winter	(B) Alpine skiing	0	
Winter	(G) Alpine skiing	0	
Winter	(B) Basketball	1	2024
Winter	(G) Basketball	1	2004
Winter	(B) Hockey	4	2000, 2004, 2009, 2010
Winter	(G) Hockey	5	2012, 2018, 2019, 2020, 2026
Winter	(B) Nordic skiing	0	
Winter	(G) Nordic skiing	0	
Winter	(G) Gymnastics	0	
Winter	(B) Swimming and Diving (co-op with Blake School)	10	2009, 2010, 2017, 2018, 2019, 2020, 2021, 2022, 2023, 2024
Spring	(B) Baseball	0	
Spring	(B) Golf	1	2004
Spring	(G) Golf	0	
Spring	(B) Lacrosse	0	
Spring	(G) Lacrosse	0	
Spring	(G) Softball	0	
Spring	(B) Tennis	7	1995, 1997, 1998, 2001, 2009, 2011, 2012, 2016, 2020
Spring	(B) Track and field	0	
Spring	(G) Track and field	2	1996, 1997
Total		39	

== Awards ==
School	Award	Year
Lower School	U.S. Department of Education "School of Excellence"	1988
Middle and Upper Schools	U.S. Department of Education "Blue Ribbon School"	1993

== Notable alumni ==
- Frank Mars 1901, creator of the Milky Way and other candy bars
- Walter Lewis Bush, Jr. 1947, former owner of the Minnesota North Stars, member of the United States Hockey Hall of Fame, and recipient of the Olympic Order
- Richard Proudfit 1949, founder of the non-profit, Feed My Starving Children
- Stanley Hubbard 1951, Chairman and President, Hubbard Broadcasting
- Bradford Parkinson 1952, inventor of Global Positioning System (GPS) technology
- Paul Johnson 1953, ice hockey gold medal Olympian and member of the United States Hockey Hall of Fame
- Lee R. Anderson, Sr. 1957, owner and chairman of Minnesota-based APi Group, Inc.
- R. T. Rybak 1974, Mayor of Minneapolis for three terms from 2002 to 2014
- Alice Goodman 1976, poet
- Spencer Reece 1981, author and poet
- Wayne Wilderson 1984, television actor
- Erik Stolhanske 1987, actor/comedian
- Alec Soth 1988, photographer
- Craig Taborn 1988, pianist, keyboardist and composer
- Craig Finn 1989, frontman of the band The Hold Steady
- Marisa Coughlan 1992, actor
- Charlie Korsmo 1996, former child actor turned lawyer
- Dominique Byrd 2002, former NFL tight end
- John Curry 2002, former NHL goaltender
- Peter Mueller, former center for HC Kometa Brno
- Blake Wheeler 2004, former captain and right wing for the Winnipeg Jets
- Jamie Erdahl 2007, NFL Network host and sports broadcaster
- Kate Schipper 2013, forward for the Minnesota Whitecaps
- David Roddy 2019, basketball player for Hapoel Jerusalem of the Israeli Basketball Premier League, formerly NBA player
- Grace Zumwinkle 2017, forward for Minnesota Frost
