= Feed My Starving Children =

US-based Christian nonprofit organization

- Formation: 1987
- Legal status: 501(c)(3)
- Headquarters: Coon Rapids, Minnesota, United States
- Region served: 110 countries
- Website: www.fmsc.org

Feed My Starving Children (FMSC) is a Christian nonprofit organization that coordinates the packaging and distribution of food to people in developing nations. Founded in 1987, it says it has been involved in more than 110 countries.

== Founding ==
Richard Proudfit, a Minneapolis businessman, founded the organization in 1987 after visiting Honduras after a hurricane and seeing food insecurity among children.

In 1993, with the help of a team of Cargill food scientists and colleagues from General Mills and Pillsbury, a vitamin-and-mineral fortified rice meal was created specifically for malnourished children around the age of five years old. FMSC changed the name from "Fortified Rice Soy Casserole" to MannaPack Rice in 2008.

The organization recruits volunteers, including schoolchildren, to assist in packing. It also employs paid staff to supervise the operations. FMSC has eight packing facilities: three in Minnesota (Coon Rapids, Eagan and Chanhassen), three in Illinois (Aurora, Libertyville and Schaumburg), one in Richardson, Texas, and one in Tempe, Arizona.
