= Nelli Laitinen =

Finnish ice hockey player (born 2002)

- Born: 29 April 2002 (age 24) Lohja, Finland
- Height: 1.69 m (5 ft 7 in)
- Weight: 62 kg (137 lb; 9 st 11 lb)
- Position: Defense
- Shoots: Left
- PWHL team Former teams: Hamilton Havoc; Kiekko-Espoo; KJT Kerava; Minnesota Golden Gophers
- National team: Finland
- Playing career: 2017–present
Medal record
Olympic Games
Bronze medal – third place	2022 Beijing	Ice hockey
World Championship
Silver medal – second place	2019 Finland
Bronze medal – third place	2021 Canada
Bronze medal – third place	2024 United States
Bronze medal – third place	2025 Czechia

Nelli Laitinen (born 29 April 2002) is a Finnish ice hockey player for the Hamilton Havoc in the Professional Women's Hockey League (PWHL) and member of the Finnish national team. She previously played as a captain of the Minnesota Golden Gophers during the 2025–26 NCAA Division I women's ice hockey season.

== Playing career ==
Laitinen began her college ice hockey career with the Minnesota Golden Gophers women's ice hockey program in the Western Collegiate Hockey Association (WCHA) conference of the NCAA Division I as an incoming freshman for the 2022–23 season. Despite missing eight games due to an upper-body injury that kept her sidelined for two months, she tallied 18 points and ranked third for points of all team defenseman. Her impressive first season was recognized with her selection to the Watch List for the Hockey Commissioners Association National Rookie of the Year and naming to the USCHO All-Rookie and the WCHA All-Rookie teams.

=== Professional ===
On June 17, 2026, Laitinen was drafted sixth overall by the Hamilton Havoc in the 2026 PHWL draft, making her the first entry draft player in team franchise history.

== International play ==
As a junior player with the Finnish national under-18 team, she participated in the IIHF U18 Women's World Championships in 2017, 2018, 2019, and 2020.

Laitinen made her senior national team debut at the 2018 4 Nations Cup in Saskatoon, Canada, where she contributed one assist in four games to Finland's bronze medal victory. Later that season, she represented Finland at the 2019 IIHF Women's World Championship. At sixteen years old, she was the youngest player on the team and 29 years younger than Finland's eldest player, Riikka Sallinen. She recorded one assist in seven games as Finland won the first World Championship silver medal in team history.

She won bronze medals representing Finland at the 2021 IIHF Women's World Championship and in the women's ice hockey tournament at the 2022 Winter Olympics in Beijing.

At the 2023 IIHF Women's World Championship, she notched 3 goals and 7 assists in seven games, ranking third on the team points table in a tie with forwards Noora Tulus and Viivi Vainikka, each scoring 10 points. Her totals ranked second of all Finnish defensemen, trailing captain Jenni Hiirikoski by just 1 assist.

On 2 January 2026, she was named to Finland's roster to compete at the 2026 Winter Olympics. Laitinen served as an alternate captain during the Olympic ice hockey tournament.

== Personal life ==
Laitinen's older brother, Vili (born 1999), is a professional ice hockey defenseman. He has played in the Finnish Liiga, the Danish Metal Ligaen, and with Italian clubs in the ICE Hockey League and Alps Hockey League. When she joined the Minnesota Golden Gophers, the jersey number 9, which she had worn in her career to that point, was already in use and she selected 7 as her new number because her brother had worn it in the past.

In January 2022, she confirmed that she was in a relationship with NHL player Jesperi Kotkaniemi.

She graduated with a bachelor's degree in business from the University of Minnesota in 2026. Swedish national team player Josefin Bouveng was one of her four roommates during her first year at the university.

== Career statistics ==
=== Regular season and playoffs ===
Naisten SM-sarja (NSMs) was rebranded as Naisten Liiga (NSML) in 2017 and Auroraliiga in 2024. Espoo Blues renamed as Kiekko-Espoo in 2019.

			Regular season					Playoffs
Season	Team	League	GP	G	A	Pts	PIM	GP	G	A	Pts	PIM
2016–17	HAKI	N. Mestis	8	4	2	6	0	–	–	–	–	–
2016–17	HAKI	N. Suomi-sarja	2	2	0	2	0	–	–	–	–	–
2016–17	KJT (L)	NSMs	1	0	0	0	0	4	0	0	0	2
2017–18	HAKI U16	U16 Mestis	18	3	8	11	0	–	–	–	–	–
2017–18	Espoo Blues	NSML	11	2	1	3	0	10	1	4	5	2
2017–18	KJT (L)	NSML	3	0	0	0	0	–	–	–	–	–
2018–19	Espoo Blues	NSML	27	12	27	39	6	6	0	5	5	0
2019–20	Kiekko-Espoo	NSML	28	7	24	31	12	6	6	8	14	6
2020–21	Kiekko-Espoo	NSML	24	13	24	37	20	10	1	6	7	6
2021–22	Kiekko-Espoo	NSML	23	7	24	31	16	10	8	13	21	8
2022–23	Minnesota Golden Gophers	WCHA	30	3	15	18	4	–	–	–	–	—
2023–24	Minnesota Golden Gophers	WCHA	39	6	17	23	10	–	–	–	–	—
2024–25	Minnesota Golden Gophers	WCHA	42	3	19	22	16	–	–	–	–	—
2025–26	Minnesota Golden Gophers	WCHA	33	10	20	30	2	–	–	–	–	—
Naisten Liiga totals			117	41	100	141	54	42	16	36	52	22
NCAA totals			145	22	72	94	32	–	–	–	–	–

Note: Postseason results for the 2016–17 season are from the qualification series (Finnish: Karsintasarja) rather than the playoffs and are not calculated with playoff totals.
Sources: Elite Prospects, Finnish Ice Hockey Association, University of Minnesota Athletics

=== International ===
Year	Team	Event	Result	GP	G	A	Pts	PIM
2017	Finland	U18	5th	5	0	1	1	4
2018	Finland	U18	5th	5	0	4	4	0
2019	Finland	U18	3rd place, bronze medalist(s)	6	1	3	4	4
2019	Finland	WC	2nd place, silver medalist(s)	7	0	1	1	2
2020	Finland	U18	4th	6	3	1	4	2
2021	Finland	WC	3rd place, bronze medalist(s)	7	1	0	1	4
2022	Finland	OG	3rd place, bronze medalist(s)	7	2	5	7	4
2022	Finland	WC	6th	7	1	4	5	6
2023	Finland	WC	5th	7	3	7	10	2
2024	Finland	WC	3rd place, bronze medalist(s)	7	1	3	4	4
2025	Finland	WC	3rd place, bronze medalist(s)	7	0	3	3	0
2026	Finland	OG	6th	5	0	0	0	0
Junior totals				22	4	9	13	10
Senior totals				54	8	23	31	22

Sources: Finnish Ice Hockey Association, International Ice Hockey Federation

== Honors and achievements ==
Award	Period
International
World U18 Top-3 Player on Team	2018, 2019, 2020
World U18 All-Star Team	2019
World U18 Bronze Medal	2019
World U18 Best Defenseman	2020
World Championship Silver Medal	2019
World Championship Bronze Medal	2021, 2024, 2025
Olympic Bronze Medal	2022
World Championship Top-3 Player on Team	2024
Minnesota Golden Gophers
USCHO All-Rookie Team	2022–23
WCHA All-Conference Rookie Team	2022–23
National Rookie of the Year Watch List	2022–23
WCHA Defender of the Week	23–29 October 2023
WCHA All-Conference Second Team	2023–24, 2025–26
AHCA All-American, Second Team	2025–26
Naisten Liiga
All-Star First Team	2019, 2020, 2021, 2022
Aurora Borealis Cup Champion	2019, 2021, 2022
Päivi Halonen Award (Best Defenseman)	2020, 2021, 2022
U18 Student Athlete	2020
Player of the Month	October 2020
Karoliina Rantamäki Award (Playoff MVP)	2022

== See also ==
- List of Finnish women in North American collegiate ice hockey
- List of Olympic women's ice hockey players for Finland
