= Greg May =

American college ice hockey coach (born 1985)

Current position
- Title: Head coach
- Team: Minnesota Golden Gophers
- Conference: WCHA
- Record: 0–0–0

Biographical details
- Born: May 2, 1985 (age 41); Burnsville, Minnesota
- Education: Augsburg University

Playing career
- 2003–07: Augsburg University

Coaching career (HC unless noted)
- 2021–23: Augsburg University
- 2023–26: Minnesota (Associate HC)
- 2026–present: Minnesota

Head coaching record
- Overall: 41–15–2

Accomplishments and honors

Championships
- MIAC Regular Season (2022); MIAC tournament (2023)

Awards
- MIAC Coach of the Year (2022)

Greg "Boom" May (born May 2, 1985) is the women's ice hockey head coach at the University of Minnesota. He is the program's third head coach, taking over from Brad Frost in 2026.

== Early life ==
Greg May was born and raised in Burnsville, Minnesota. He graduated from Augsburg University in 2003 with a bachelor's degree in health education and physical education. He then got a master's degree in education leadership from Concordia University in Saint Paul, Minnesota. He spent ten years coaching at different high schools in Minnesota, including at Blake School, Farmington High School, as well as at his high school alma mater, Burnsville High School. His first collegiate coaching experience came as the Director of Hockey Operations for the Minnesota Golden Gophers men's team. He then moved on to coach at his collegiate alma mater, Augsburg University, for two years, before returning to the University of Minnesota as associate head coach for the women's team.

== Head coaching record ==
Record table
| Season | Team | Overall | Conference | Standing | Postseason |
|---|---|---|---|---|---|
Minnesota Golden Gophers (Western Collegiate Hockey Association) (2007–present)
| 2021–22 | Augsburg | 25–5–0 | 14–2–0 | 1st | NCAA Quarterfinals |
| 2022–23 | Augsburg | 16–10–2 | 10–5–1 | 2nd | NCAA Frozen Four |
| Augsburg: | | 41–15–2 | 24–7–1 | | |
| Total: | | 41–15–2 | | | |
National champion Postseason invitational champion Conference regular season champion Conference regular season and conference tournament champion Division regular season champion Division regular season and conference tournament champion Conference tournament champion

== Personal life ==
May is married to Lenia, and they have two daughters together.
