= Emily Zumwinkle =

American ice hockey player (born 2003)

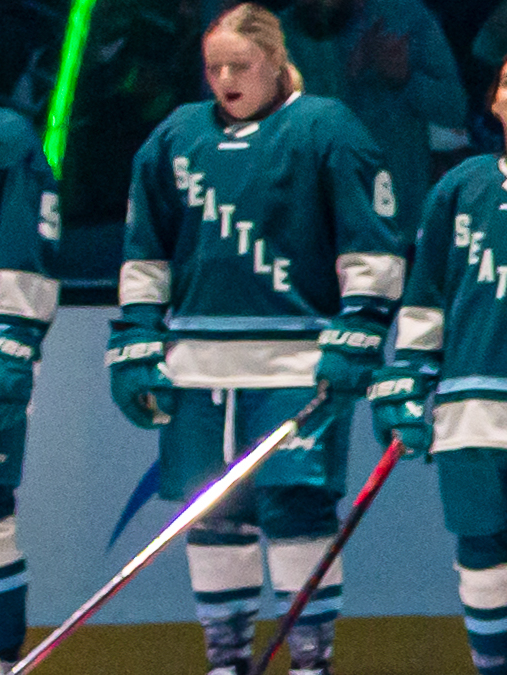
- Zumwinkle with the Seattle Torrent in 2025
- Born: May 20, 2003 (age 23) Excelsior, Minnesota, U.S.
- Height: 5 ft 9 in (175 cm)
- Position: Defence
- Shoots: Right
- PWHL team: Seattle Torrent
- Playing career: 2021–present

Emily Zumwinkle (born May 20, 2003) is an American professional ice hockey player for the Seattle Torrent of the Professional Women's Hockey League (PWHL). She played college ice hockey at Minnesota and Ohio State.

== Early life ==
Zumwinkle attended Breck School and played tennis, golf and ice hockey. She helped lead Breck to three-consecutive state championships, winning Minnesota Class A state titles as a freshman, sophomore, and junior.

== Playing career ==
=== College ===
Zumwinkle began her collegiate career for Minnesota during the 2021–22 season. During her freshman year, she recorded four goals and five assists in 39 games. She scored her first career goal on November 12, 2021, in a game against RIT. She led all WCHA rookies in plus/minus rating (+29) and was named to the WCHA All-Rookie Team.

During the 2022–23 season, in her sophomore year, she recorded eight assists in 38 games. On January 7, 2023, she recorded a career-high three assists in a game against New Hampshire, including the secondary assist on her sister Grace Zumwinkle's 100th career goal. During the 2023–24 season, in her junior year, she recorded three assists in 38 games.

Following her junior year, she transferred to Ohio State for her final year of eligibility. During the 2024–25 season, in her senior year, she recorded two goals, seven assists and nine blocked shots in 40 games.

=== Professional ===
In October 2025, she was invited to the Seattle Torrent's training camp. On November 20, 2025, she signed a reserve player contract with the Torrent. On April 17, 2026, she was activated from the reserve player list and signed a ten-day contract with the Torrent. She made her PWHL debut during the final game of the regular season against the Montreal Victoire on April 25, 2026.

== Personal life ==
Zumwinkle was born to Mike and Lori Zumwinkle, and has two siblings, Grace and Anna. Her father played college football at St. John's University from 1982 to 1986, and her mother played tennis for College of Saint Benedict and Saint John's University from 1983 to 1987. Her older sister, Grace also played college ice hockey at Minnesota and currently plays for the Minnesota Frost of the PWHL. Her older sister, Anna played college ice hockey and golf at Middlebury College.

== Career statistics ==
| | | | Regular season | | | | | Playoffs |
| Season | Team | League | GP | G | A | Pts | PIM | GP | G | A | Pts | PIM |
|---|---|---|---|---|---|---|---|---|---|---|---|---|
| 2021–22 | University of Minnesota | WCHA | 39 | 4 | 5 | 9 | 12 | — | — | — | — | — |
| 2022–23 | University of Minnesota | WCHA | 38 | 0 | 8 | 8 | 2 | — | — | — | — | — |
| 2023–24 | University of Minnesota | WCHA | 38 | 0 | 3 | 3 | 0 | — | — | — | — | — |
| 2024–25 | Ohio State University | WCHA | 40 | 2 | 7 | 9 | 12 | — | — | — | — | — |
| 2025–26 | Seattle Torrent | PWHL | 1 | 0 | 0 | 0 | 0 | — | — | — | — | — |
| PWHL totals | | | 1 | 0 | 0 | 0 | 0 | — | — | — | — | — |
