= Grace Zumwinkle =

American ice hockey player (born 1999)

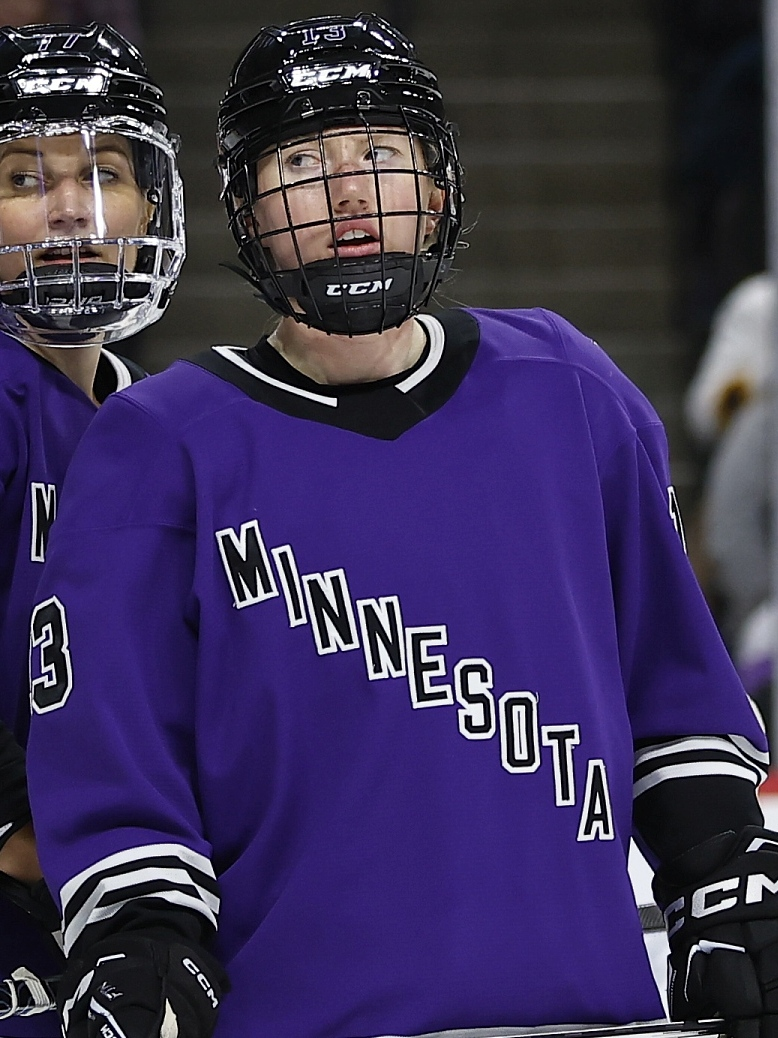
- Zumwinkle with PWHL Minnesota in 2024
- Born: April 23, 1999 (age 27) Excelsior, Minnesota, U.S.
- Height: 5 ft 9 in (175 cm)
- Weight: 165 lb (75 kg; 11 st 11 lb)
- Position: Forward
- Shoots: Right
- PWHL team: Minnesota Frost
- National team: United States
- Playing career: 2017–present
Medal record
Olympic Games
Gold medal – first place	2026 Milano Cortina	Team
Silver medal – second place	2022 Beijing	Team
World Championships
Gold medal – first place	2025 Czechia
Gold medal – first place	2026 Denmark
Silver medal – second place	2021 Canada
Silver medal – second place	2022 Denmark
World U18 Championships
Gold medal – first place	2016 Canada
Gold medal – first place	2017 Czech Republic

Grace Zumwinkle (born April 23, 1999) is an American professional ice hockey player for the Minnesota Frost of the Professional Women's Hockey League (PWHL) and the United States national team. She is a 2026 Winter Olympic gold medalist and a 2022 Winter Olympic silver medalist. Zumwinkle has won five World Championship medals, including gold at the 2025 World Championship and the 2026 World Championship and silver medals in 2021, 2022, and 2024.

Zumwinkle has won back-to-back Walter Cup championships with the Minnesota Frost in 2024 and 2025. She earned PWHL Rookie of the Year honors in 2024 and scored the first hat-trick in PWHL history.

At the collegiate level, Zumwinkle played four seasons for the Minnesota Golden Gophers, where she was a two-time Patty Kazmaier Award finalist and served as team captain during her senior year.

== Early life ==
Born in Excelsior, Minnesota to Lori (Bodensteiner) and Mike Zumwinkle, Grace was raised with her two sisters, Anna and Emily. Her father played college football at St. John's University from 1982 to 1986, and her mother played tennis for the College of Saint Benedict and Saint John's University from 1983 to 1987. Zumwinkle began playing hockey as a young child after repeatedly asking her parents for skates. She played club hockey with the Minnesota Jr. Whitecaps.

Zumwinkle attended Breck School in Golden Valley, Minnesota, where she was a three-sport athlete, competing in ice hockey, tennis, and golf. During her senior year in 2016–17, Zumwinkle served as team captain and was a four-time team MVP. She recorded 58 points (42 goals, 16 assists) in 23 games, leading Breck to a 19–6–3 overall record and a section runner-up finish. She was named the 2017 Star Tribune Metro Player of the Year, received the Athena Award, was a five-time all-conference selection, three-time all-metro, and three-time all-state honoree. She was also named Minnesota Ms. Hockey as the best female Minnesota high school player in 2017.

In tennis, Zumwinkle earned two state doubles titles and two state runner-up finishes in doubles competition and was part of Breck's state champion tennis team in 2013. In golf, she placed eighth as an individual at the state tournament in 2016 and was part of three top-eight state tournament teams.

== Playing career ==
=== College ===
Zumwinkle played five seasons for the Minnesota Golden Gophers from 2017 to 2021, serving as team captain during her senior year. During her freshman season, she recorded 17 goals and 21 assists in 38 games to lead the team in scoring. She tied for the team lead with eight multi-point games. She was named the WCHA Rookie of the Week for the week ending December 12, 2017. She led all rookies with five points and recorded two goals and three assists in two games during the weekend. She was also named the WCHA Offensive Player of the Month for December 2017. In four games in December, she led all WCHA players with four goals and four assists, including one game-winning goal. Following an outstanding season, she was named to the All-WCHA First Team, WCHA All-Rookie team and WCHA Scoring Champion. She became the first freshman to be named WCHA Scoring Champion since 2010.

External videos
- Grace Zumwinkle: 2021 Patty Kazmaier Top-10 Finalist, Minnesota Gophers

During the 2018–19 season, she ranked second on the team in scoring with 41 points in 39 games and led the team with six multi-goal games. She led Minnesota and ranked second in the WCHA with 25 goals, and led the WCHA and tied for second in the nation with seven power-play goals. She also ranked second in the WCHA with 0.64 goals per game and fifth in the WCHA with 1.05 points per game. On November 30, 2018, she recorded a career-high five points with her first career hat-trick and two assists in a game against Yale. She was subsequently named the WCHA Forward of the Week and NCAA Second Star of the Week for the week ending December 4, 2018. She was also named WCHA Forward of the Month for November 2018 after leading the league with seven goals and 11 points. She was named WCHA Forward of the Week for the week ending January 29, 2019, and she tied for the WCHA lead with four points and three goals over the weekend. She was also named WCHA Forward of the Month for January 2019 after leading the league with 12 points, eight goals, three power-play goals, and four power-play points during January.

During the 2019–20 season, she ranked second on the team with a career-high 45 points. She led the team, and ranked third in the WCHA with 25 goals, ranked second in the WCHA, and 10th in the nation with a +37 plus/minus rating. She was named WCHA Forward of the Week for the week ending October 29, 2019. She scored four of Minnesota's seven goals against Ohio State with a pair of two-goal games during the series. She also recorded her 50th career goal as a Gopher. The following week she was again WCHA Forward of the Week for the week ending November 5, 2019, after leading Minnesota with four points on two goals and two assists during the weekend series against the top-ranked Wisconsin Badgers. On November 16, 2019, she recorded her 100th career point with an assist in a game against Bemidji State. She became the 35th player in program history to reach the milestone. On February 29, 2020, she recorded her second career hat-trick in a game against St. Cloud State. She was subsequently named WCHA Forward of the Week for the week ending March 3, 2020. Following an outstanding season, she was named to the All-WCHA Second Team.

On July 14, 2021, she was named captain for the 2020–21 season. During her senior year she ranked third in the WCHA and eighth in the nation with 24 points, and second the WCHA and in the nation with 17 goals. She was named WCHA Forward of the Week for the week ending December 3, 2020. During the first four games of the season, she led the team with three goals and one assist. She was also named WCHA Forward of the Month for November 2020. On February 19, 2021, she recorded her third career hat trick in a game against Bemidji State. She was subsequently named WCHA Forward of the Week for the week ending February 23, 2021, her ninth WCHA weekly award. She was also named WCHA Forward of the Month for February 2021, her fifth WCHA monthly award. She led the WCHA with 11 points, seven goals, 28 shots on goal, and a +9 rating in six games during February. Following an outstanding season she was named All-WCHA First Team, AHCA All-America Second Team, All-USCHO Second Team, and a top-three finalist for the Patty Kazmaier Award.

=== Professional ===
==== Minnesota Frost (2023–present) ====
===== 2023–24 season =====
External videos
- Grace Zumwinkle after scoring 1st PWHL hat trick, CBC Sports

On September 18, 2023, Zumwinkle was drafted in the third round, 13th overall, by PWHL Minnesota in the 2023 PWHL Draft. She made an immediate impact in her professional debut. In Minnesota's first home game on January 6, 2024, she scored the PWHL's first-ever hat-trick in a 3–0 victory over Montreal in front of a record-setting crowd of 13,316 fans at Xcel Energy Center, which set a new record for attendance at a professional women's hockey game. She was subsequently named the league's inaugural first star of the week.

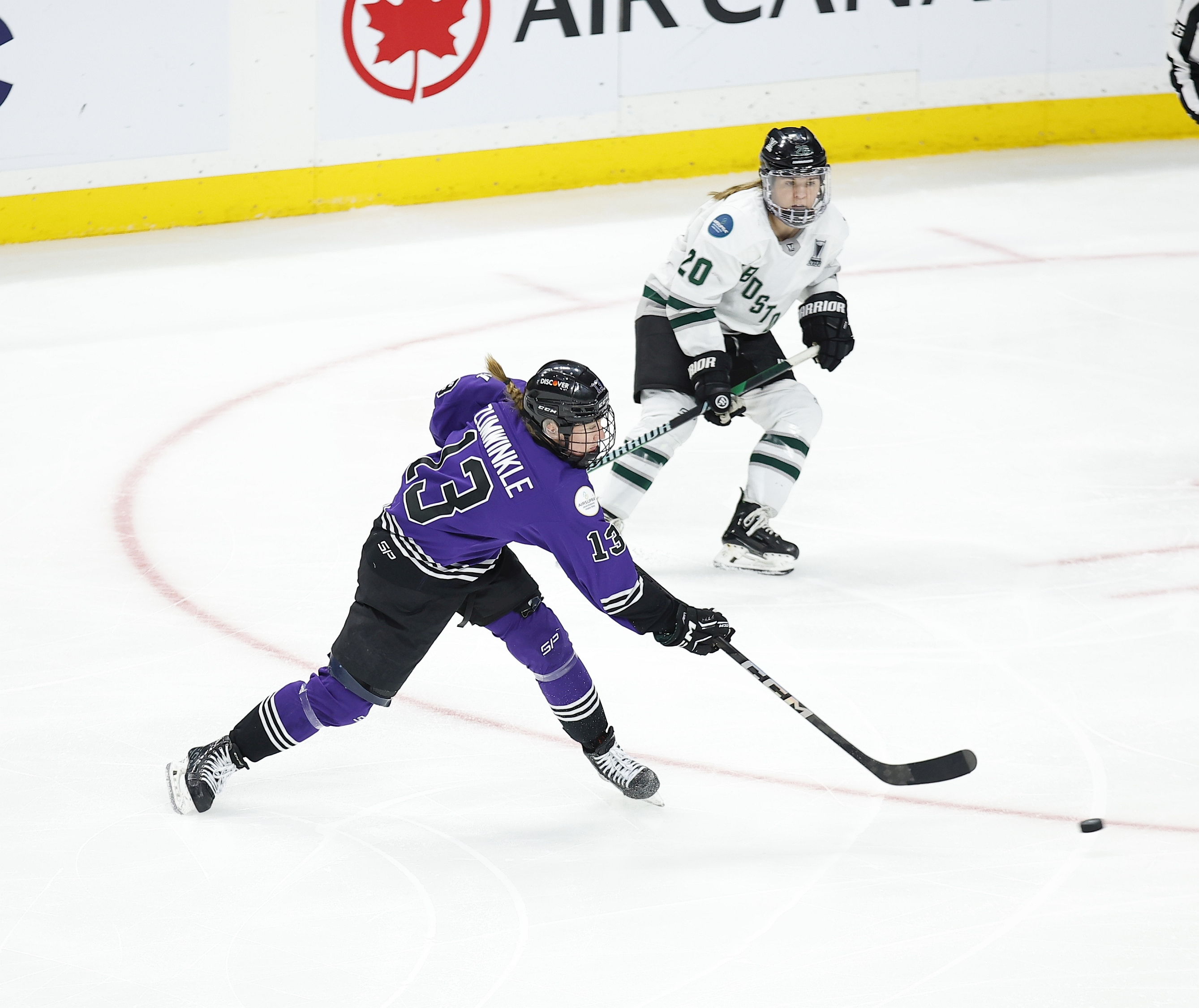
Zumwinkle (#13) during Game 3 of the 2024 PWHL Playoffs, May 2024

Throughout the regular season, Zumwinkle was one of Minnesota's most productive players. In 24 regular season games, she recorded 11 goals and eight assists for 19 points, ranking second in the PWHL in goals and leading her team in scoring for much of the season. Her 11 goals included two power-play goals and four game-winning goals, demonstrating her ability to score in crucial moments. She also led the league with 98 shots on goal and tied for first in shootout goals with three. Zumwinkle's offensive production was particularly notable given that Minnesota was the second-lowest scoring team in the league with only 52 goals, as she nearly single-handedly carried the team's offense into playoff contention. Minnesota finished the regular season with a 10–5–4–5 record (34 points), clinching the fourth and final playoff spot on the last day of the regular season. Despite struggling late in the year with a five-game losing streak to end the regular season, the team rallied in the playoffs.

In the 2024 playoffs, Minnesota pulled off a dramatic reverse sweep against first-seeded Toronto in the semifinals, losing the first two games before winning three straight to advance to the Walter Cup Finals. Zumwinkle contributed one goal in ten playoff games as the Frost defeated Boston in five games to capture the inaugural Walter Cup championship on May 29, 2024.

Following the season, Zumwinkle was named PWHL Rookie of the Year on June 11, 2024, earning the inaugural award. She was also selected to the PWHL All-Star Second Team and All-Rookie Team.

===== 2024–25 season =====
Zumwinkle's second professional season was impacted by a shoulder injury that kept her out for approximately three weeks in January 2025. Despite the setback, she appeared in games throughout the season and recorded four goals and six assists in regular season play. Minnesota finished with a 10–5–4–11 record (44 points), once again securing the fourth and final playoff spot on the last day of the regular season.

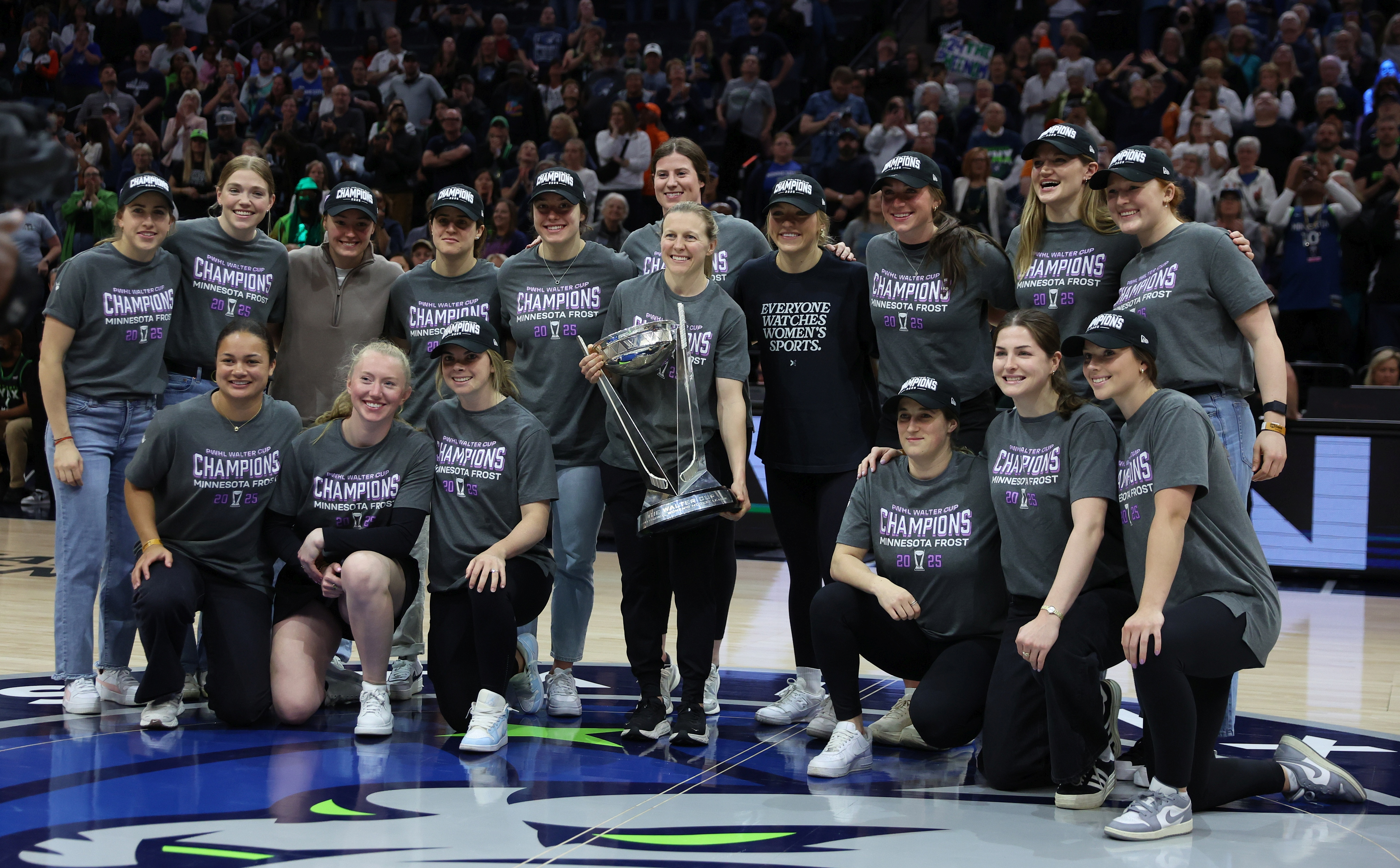
Zumwinkle (bottom row; second from left) and her Frost teammates with the 2025 Walter Cup

In the 2025 playoffs, the Frost again faced Toronto in the semifinals, this time as the second seed. After losing Game 1, Minnesota won three consecutive games to defeat the Sceptres 3–1 in the series. The Frost then advanced to face Ottawa in the Walter Cup Finals. All four games in the Finals were decided by 2–1 overtime scores. After losing Game 1, Minnesota won the next three games, including a triple-overtime thriller in Game 3, to clinch their second consecutive Walter Cup championship on May 26, 2025, with a 2–1 overtime victory at home. In the playoffs, Zumwinkle tallied three assists in eight games and recorded a career-high 10 shots on goal in the championship-clinching Game 4. With the victory, she became a two-time Walter Cup champion.

===== 2025–26 season =====
Entering the 2025–26 season, Zumwinkle returned to the Frost roster as one of nine back-to-back Walter Cup champions, as Minnesota looked to become the first team in PWHL history to win three consecutive championships. On December 19, 2024, she recorded her first multi-goal game of the season, scoring two goals including a power-play marker and an empty-net goal in a 5–2 victory over Ottawa. On December 30, 2025, she added another power-play goal in a 5–1 road victory over Toronto, giving her two power-play goals in just eight games—matching her total from the previous two seasons combined. Her power-play production tied her for the league lead among all PWHL skaters in late December.

== International play ==
=== Junior ===
Zumwinkle represented the United States at the 2016 and 2017 IIHF World Women's U18 Championships, where she won gold both times.

=== Senior ===
==== Olympics ====
On January 2, 2022, Zumwinkle was named to Team USA's roster to represent the United States at the 2022 Winter Olympics in Beijing. Zumwinkle scored her first Olympic goal in Team USA's 5–0 victory over the Russian Olympic Committee on February 5, 2022. The goal came in a dominant third period where the United States scored three goals in a span of 4:47, with the team outshooting the ROC 62–12 throughout the game. The United States advanced to the gold medal game where they faced Canada, losing 3–2 in the final. With the team, Zumwinkle won the silver medal. This marked Team USA's fourth Olympic silver medal, the most of any country in women's ice hockey.

External videos
- Grace Zumwinkle: 2022 Olympic Introduction, USA Hockey

On January 2, 2026, Zumwinkle was named to Team USA's roster to compete at the 2026 Winter Olympics in Milano Cortina. Her inclusion on the roster was considered reassuring after a challenging four-year period since the 2022 Olympics. She was left off the 2023 World Championship roster and served as an alternate in 2024 before making her way back into the team. Zumwinkle was one of 21 players from the 2025 World Championship gold medal team named to the Olympic roster, and one of 11 returning from the 2022 Beijing Olympics. The roster featured six Minnesota Frost players, making it one of the most represented PWHL teams.

==== World Championships ====
Zumwinkle represented Team USA at the IIHF World Women's Championship in 2021, 2022, 2024, and 2025. Although she made the roster in 2020, the tournament did not occur due to COVID-19. As of January 2026, Zumwinkle has won one gold medal (2025) and three silver medals (2021, 2022, 2024).

Zumwinkle made her World Championship debut at the 2021 IIHF Women's World Championship in Calgary, Alberta, after being selected to the 2020 roster that was cancelled. She made an immediate impact in her first senior team appearance, scoring a goal in each of the team's first two games. She opened the scoring against Finland in a 3–0 victory and was named Player of the Game, then scored against Switzerland. Zumwinkle finished the tournament with four goals, tied for third on the team alongside veterans Hilary Knight and Alex Carpenter. Team USA won the silver medal after losing to Canada in the final.

At the 2022 IIHF Women's World Championship in Denmark, Zumwinkle recorded an assist on the opening goal in Team USA's 10–1 semifinal victory over the Czech Republic. Team USA again won silver, falling to Canada in the gold medal game.

Zumwinkle was not selected to the 2023 IIHF Women's World Championship roster under new head coach John Wroblewski, who brought a new look to the team with six newcomers making their World Championship debuts. Team USA won the gold medal, defeating Canada 6–3 in the final held in Brampton, Ontario. The following year, she was named to the 2024 IIHF Women's World Championship roster, which was considered a preview for the 2026 Olympics roster. Team USA captured a third consecutive silver medal, losing once more to Canada in the final.

At the 2025 IIHF Women's World Championship in Czechia, Zumwinkle was part of the team that helped the United States capture gold with a perfect 7–0 record. She recorded one assist during the tournament. In the gold medal game, Team USA defeated Canada 4–3 in overtime. The victory marked Zumwinkle's first gold medal and fifth overall medal at the World Championships, breaking a streak of three consecutive silver medals against Canada. She was one of 21 players who had returned from the 2024 roster.

==== Other international competitions ====
Zumwinkle has also represented the United States in the Rivalry Series in 2022–23, 2023–24, and 2024–25, as well as the 2021 My Why Tour.

== Personal life ==
Her younger sister, Emily, also played college ice hockey at Minnesota and currently plays for the Seattle Torrent of the PWHL Her older sister, Anna, played D3 hockey for Middlebury. According to her USA Hockey profile, Zumwinkle's favorite postgame meal is chicken, and she wants to pursue a career in finance after her hockey career.

== Career statistics ==
=== Regular season and playoffs ===
Note: GP = Games played; G = Goals; A = Assists; Pts = Points; PIM = Penalty minutes;

			Regular season					Playoffs
Season	Team	League	GP	G	A	Pts	PIM	GP	G	A	Pts	PIM
2017–18	University of Minnesota	WCHA	38	17	21	38	4	—	—	—	—	—
2018–19	University of Minnesota	WCHA	39	25	16	41	4	—	—	—	—	—
2019–20	University of Minnesota	WCHA	36	25	20	45	10	—	—	—	—	—
2020–21	University of Minnesota	WCHA	20	17	7	24	4	—	—	—	—	—
2022–23	University of Minnesota	WCHA	38	25	36	61	0	—	—	—	—	—
2023–24	PWHL Minnesota	PWHL	24	11	8	19	4	10	1	0	1	0
2024–25	Minnesota Frost	PWHL	22	4	6	10	0	8	0	3	3	4
PWHL totals			46	15	14	29	4	18	1	3	4	4

=== International ===
Year	Team	Event	Result	GP	G	A	Pts	PIM
2015	United States	U18	1st place, gold medalist(s)	5	1	2	3	2
2016	United States	U18	1st place, gold medalist(s)	5	4	2	6	2
2021	United States	WC	2nd place, silver medalist(s)	7	4	2	6	2
2022	United States	OG	2nd place, silver medalist(s)	7	1	0	1	0
2022	United States	WC	2nd place, silver medalist(s)	6	1	2	3	0
2025	United States	WC	1st place, gold medalist(s)	6	0	1	1	0
2026	United States	OG	1st place, gold medalist(s)	7	0	1	1	0
Junior totals				10	5	4	9	4
Senior totals				33	6	6	12	2

== Awards and honors ==
Honors	Year	Ref
PWHL
Walter Cup Champion	2024, 2025	
Rookie of the Year	2024	
PWHL All-Rookie Team	2024	
PWHL All-Second Team	2024	
