= Kids Against Hunger =

Nonprofit charity organization

Kids Against Hunger is a nonprofit organization owned by Richard Proudfit, up until his death on November 14, 2018. It was established with the mission to significantly reduce the number of hungry children in the United States and to feed starving children throughout the world. This is being achieved by getting volunteers involved, and by setting up food packaging satellites in the US, and through partnerships with humanitarian organizations worldwide – enabling Kids Against Hunger to deliver its specially formulated rice-soy casserole to starving children and their families in over 60 countries. The Kids Against Hunger network currently includes about 100 food packaging centers with the goal to establish 500 packaging centers in all 50 U.S. states.

== History ==
Kids Against Hunger was started in March 1999 by Richard Proudfit, a Minnesota businessman, under the name Feeding Children International. He eventually set up a program under this organization called "Kids Against Hunger". This name is used to identify the company.

Since its start in 1999, Kids Against Hunger has provided a total of 162 million meals to children and families in need in 65 countries.

The organization is also actively involved in the hunger relief efforts following the recent earthquake in Haiti by providing millions of meals to the victims.

== Food ==
Kids Against Hunger's meals have been formulated by nutritionists to provide a rich source of easily digestible protein, carbohydrates, and vitamins needed by a malnourished child's body and mind. The food also accommodates to the broad diversity of ethnic tastes and religious differences around the world. In 2012, Proudfit received the Award for Greatest Public Service Benefiting the Disadvantaged due to his work with the organization, an award given out annually by Jefferson Awards.

Kids Against Hunger's meals offer all nine of the essential amino acids required for complete nutrition.

The vitamin formula is a proprietary formula that includes 21 vitamins and minerals. Each bag of food contains six servings of the dehydrated food which when boiled will feed six children. According to the food scientists developing the food, it supplies the optimum amount of nutrition for a malnourished child. Additionally, the bags are specifically made from moisture-proof and odor-proof material to prevent spoilage and insect or rodent problems. The food bags are also three-ply for strength. Kids Against Hunger's life-saving meals have a shelf life of at least three years.

== Network ==
=== Countries ===
Each Kids Against Hunger food packaging satellite is able to choose where its packaged food will be distributed. The International Headquarters office recommends that approximately two thirds of the meals be shipped internationally, and that the remaining third be distributed locally, but allocation varies based on each satellite's location and global/local need. Some satellites focus almost exclusively on shipments to a particular country – while others put a higher emphasis on helping those in need within the local community where the food is being packaged.

=== Feeding partners ===
Kids Against Hunger does not usually ship the meals packaged by volunteers directly to foreign countries. Instead, the organization relies on the expertise of trustworthy feeding partners whom it has long-standing relationships with and can count on for getting the food safely to its destination.

Kids Against Hunger works closely with its distribution partners – churches and other nonprofit organizations, and U.S. government agencies operating in foreign countries – to manage the distribution of its meals and seeks out organizations that have a proven track record of successfully getting the food to the children, distributing it properly, and being able to handle the responsibilities of a feeding program – all while keeping the food out of the hands of corrupt government officials and criminals. The organization requires its feeding partners to document how they distribute the food and to provide it with testimonials and pictures of the children who receive the meals whenever possible.

== Volunteers ==
While Kids Against Hunger's main objective is to provide meals for starving children, the organization believes it is also essential to involve the local community where the meals are packaged. Through its volunteer-driven effort, Kids Against Hunger is able to mobilize the energy of Americans of all ages on behalf of starving children worldwide, and to satisfy their desire to be a part of something meaningful, something larger than themselves.

When volunteering at one of Kids Against Hunger's many locations, children learn about world hunger, to look beyond themselves, and that it is possible to accomplish seemingly overwhelming tasks if they are willing to work together. At the same time, these "leaders of tomorrow" discover the importance of service and how everyone can be involved in some way helping others. This enforces Kids Against Hunger's motto: "When you feed a child, you feed our future".

== Locations ==
Kids Against Hunger as of 2011 had 100 locations in 27 U.S. States and two in Canada. Increasing the number of Kids Against Hunger meals depends upon increasing the number of "satellite" packaging locations. Each Kids Against Hunger satellite is an independent nonprofit organization licensed through the headquarters office in New Hope, Minnesota, to use the Kids Against Hunger name, meal formula, and food packaging process. The actual food packaging is done by volunteers, and each Satellite Director determines where the meals his/her team packages are distributed – with a portion donated to local food shelves and the remainder sent overseas.
