= Peyton Hemp =

American ice hockey player (born 2003)

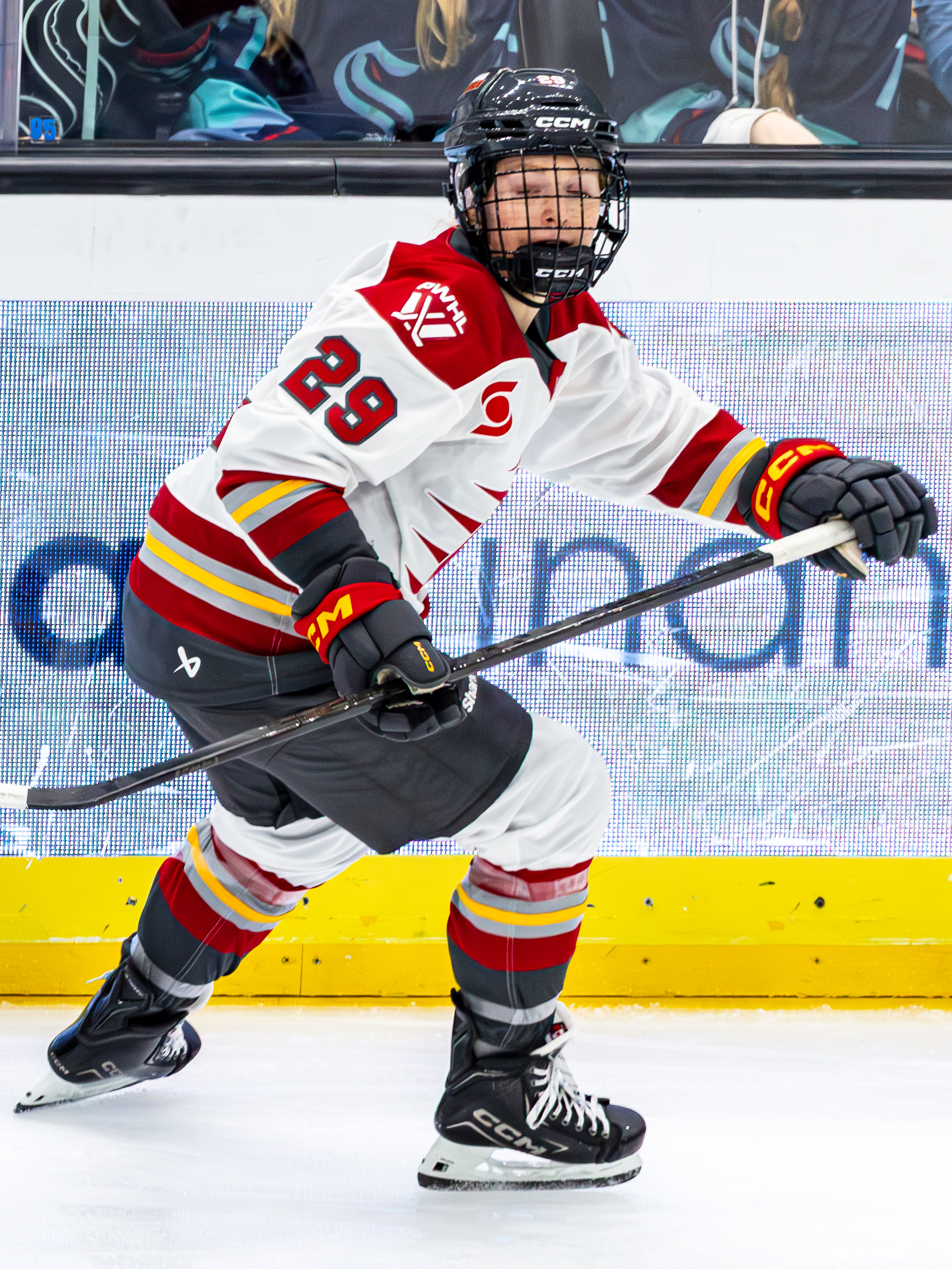
- Hemp with the Ottawa Charge in 2025
- Born: May 15, 2003 (age 23) Andover, Minnesota, U.S.
- Height: 5 ft 5 in (165 cm)
- Weight: 155 lb (70 kg; 11 st 1 lb)
- Position: Forward
- Shoots: Right
- PWHL team Former teams: Hamilton Havoc; Ottawa Charge
- Playing career: 2021–present
Medal record
World U18 Championship
Gold medal – first place	2020 Slovakia

Peyton Hemp (born May 15, 2003) is an American professional ice hockey player for the Hamilton Havoc of the Professional Women's Hockey League (PWHL). She played college ice hockey at Minnesota and was named the Women's Hockey Commissioners Association National Rookie of the Year in 2022.

== Early life ==
Hemp attended Andover High School in Andover, Minnesota. During her junior year she recorded 20 goals and 22 assists, and helped lead the Huskies to their first ever Class AA state championship in 2020. During her senior season, she recorded 34 goals and 46 assists, as she helped lead the Huskies back to the Minnesota State High School League Class AA state championship for the second straight season. Her 46 assists and 80 points are a single-season program record at Andover. She finished her career as Andover's all-time leading scorer with 253 career points. Following the season she was won the Minnesota Ms. Hockey Award in 2021.

== Playing career ==
=== College ===
Hemp began her collegiate career for Minnesota during the 2021–22 season. She made her collegiate debut on October 1, 2021, in a game against Ohio State and scored her first career goal. During September and October, she recorded three goals and eight assists in ten games. She led all WCHA freshmen in points with 11 points. She was subsequently named the Western Collegiate Hockey Association (WCHA) Rookie of the Month for October, her first monthly honor. During November she recorded two goals and five assists in six games, including three multi-point games. She was again named the WCHA Rookie of the Month for the second consecutive month, becoming the first Minnesota player to earn the award twice in the same season. During February, she recorded three goals and seven assists in eight games, and named the WCHA Rookie of the Month for February 2022. She finished the season with 12 goals and 20 assists in 37 games. She led the conference in goals (12) and points (32) by a freshman, and ranked second in the nation in points by a freshman. Following an outstanding season, she was named the WCHA Rookie of the Year and the Women's Hockey Commissioners Association National Rookie of the Year.

During the 2022–23 season, in her sophomore year, she recorded 16 goals and 12 assists in 38 games. During the 2023 WCHA women's ice hockey tournament she recorded one goal and three assists, and was named to the all-tournament team. She helped Minnesota advance to the Frozen Four of the 2023 NCAA Division I women's ice hockey tournament. On September 22, 2023, Hemp was named captain for the 2023–24 season. During her junior year, she recorded 14 goals 16 assists in 39 games, and ranked fourth on the team in goals and points. On September 20, 2024, Hemp was named co-captain for the 2024–25 season. During her senior year, she recorded 16 goals and 17 assists in 42 games. She finished her collegiate career with 58 goals and 65 assists in 156 games.

=== Professional ===
On June 24, 2025, Hemp was drafted in the fourth round, 29th overall, by the Ottawa Charge in the 2025 PWHL Draft. On November 20, 2025, she signed a one-year contract with the Charge.

== International play ==
Hemp represented the United States at the 2020 IIHF U18 Women's World Championship where she was scoreless in five games and won a gold medal.

== Personal life ==
Hemp was born to Jason and Jennifer Hemp, and has two older brothers, Morrison and Dalton, an older sister, Catalina, and two younger sisters Josie and Layla. Josie also played college ice hockey at Minnesota, before transferring to Vermont.

== Career statistics ==
=== Regular season and playoffs ===
Note: GP = Games played; G = Goals; A = Assists; Pts = Points; PIM = Penalty minutes;

			Regular season					Playoffs
Season	Team	League	GP	G	A	Pts	PIM	GP	G	A	Pts	PIM
2021–22	Minnesota Golden Gophers	WCHA	37	12	20	32	4	—	—	—	—	—
2022–23	Minnesota Golden Gophers	WCHA	38	16	12	28	20	—	—	—	—	—
2023–24	Minnesota Golden Gophers	WCHA	39	14	16	30	16	—	—	—	—	—
2024–25	Minnesota Golden Gophers	WCHA	42	16	17	33	25	—	—	—	—	—
2025–26	Ottawa Charge	PWHL	30	2	7	9	31	8	1	0	1	2
NCAA totals			156	58	65	123	65	—	—	—	—	—
PWHL totals			30	2	7	9	31	8	1	0	1	2

=== International ===
Note: GP = Games played; G = Goals; A = Assists; Pts = Points; PIM = Penalty minutes;

				Regular season
Year	Team	Event	Result	GP	G	A	Pts	PIM
2020	United States	U18	1st place, gold medalist(s)	5	0	0	0	4
Junior totals				5	0	0	0	4
