= Holy Family Catholic High School (Minnesota) =

Location
- 8101 Kochia Lane; Victoria, Minnesota 55386; United States; 44°51′31″N 93°38′39″W

Information
- Type: Private secondary school
- Motto: Find your Fire
- Religious affiliation: Roman Catholic (LaSallian)
- Established: 2000
- CEEB code: 242548
- President: Michael Brennan
- Principal: John Dols
- Teaching staff: 33.1 (on an FTE basis)
- Grades: 9–12
- Enrollment: 519 (2021–22)
- Student to teacher ratio: 15.7
- Colors: Forest green, White, and Black
- Slogan: Roll Fire
- Song: Holy Family Anthem
- Fight song: Notre Dame Victory March, We are Family (Hockey only)
- Athletics conference: Wright County Conference
- Nickname: Fire
- Accreditation: Cognia
- Website: www.hfchs.org

Holy Family Catholic High School is a coeducational, college preparatory, Catholic high school in Victoria, Minnesota.. The school serves grades 9 to 12 and follows the Lasallian tradition. In 2023, there were approximately 560 students enrolled across the four grade levels. Since opening, the high school has educated roughly 3,000 students. This school is a part of the Archdiocese of Saint Paul and Minneapolis.

== History ==
Holy Family Catholic High School was founded in 2000 by Theo Chalgren, Rob Roy, Tom Steward and Joe Morin, supported by promotional and fundraising efforts among families in the community. At time of opening, the school served only freshman and sophomore students, but has since expanded to providing education for grades 9 to 12. The campus has remained at the same address for the duration of the school's operation, but has undergone several renovations and expansions. The goal that the founders had for the institution was to create a school affiliated with Catholic faith and values of service and community.

== Student experience and culture ==
Students at the institution express that their favorite school activities to participate in at Holy Family include sporting events, prom, homecoming, and the annul school Thanksgiving Dinner. The Catholic faith is a prominent aspect of students’ experience at Holy Family. The high school encourages students to embrace their faith through activities such as monthly all-school mass, campus ministry, and service opportunities through organizations such as Lasallian Youth. There is also a chapel on campus that is open daily and offers mass on Monday, Tuesdays, Thursdays, and Fridays during the school year.

== Academics ==
Holy Family Catholic High School has a 12:1 student to teacher ratio and an average class size of 21 students. The school offers 14 advanced placement (AP) courses and more than 50 electives. Guidance counseling is also offered to all students.

== Extra-curricular activities ==
Holy Family Catholic High School offers more than 60 extracurricular activities, including 29 varsity sports and about 30 clubs and organizations such as DECA, campus ministry, and various fine arts programs. Many students that participate consistently qualify for state, regional, and national-level competitions. Holy Family Catholic High School has made 13 state appearances in swimming, jazz and high kick dance, American football, clay pigeon shooting, girls' hockey and golf, robotics, fishing, Esports, girls' and boys' fencing, as well as DECA. It has held 70 conference titles since joining the Wright County Conference for athletics.

Holy Family Fire Football has made multiple state appearances including two title games and victories in sections and conferences. Individual players have received All-Conference, All-Section, Star Tribune Prep Athlete of the Week, as well as individual and team Academic All-State awards. Several Fire Football alumni have received college scholarships in recent years from Division 1 programs like Northern Illinois University and the University of Minnesota – Twin Cities, as well as several D2 and D3 programs. Additionally, Fine Arts extracurricular opportunities are offered at Holy Family Catholic High School including vocal and instrumental music, theater, and visual arts such as photography.

== Student organizations ==
The school's Distributive Education Clubs of America (DECA) team allows students to explore career paths in business, finance, and marketing. In its first season, the team won the District 4 title, and several students advanced to the DECA International Career Development Conference in Orlando, Florida. Students may also participate in the National Honor Society, which involves community service, and in All-School Service Day.
