= Stanstead College =

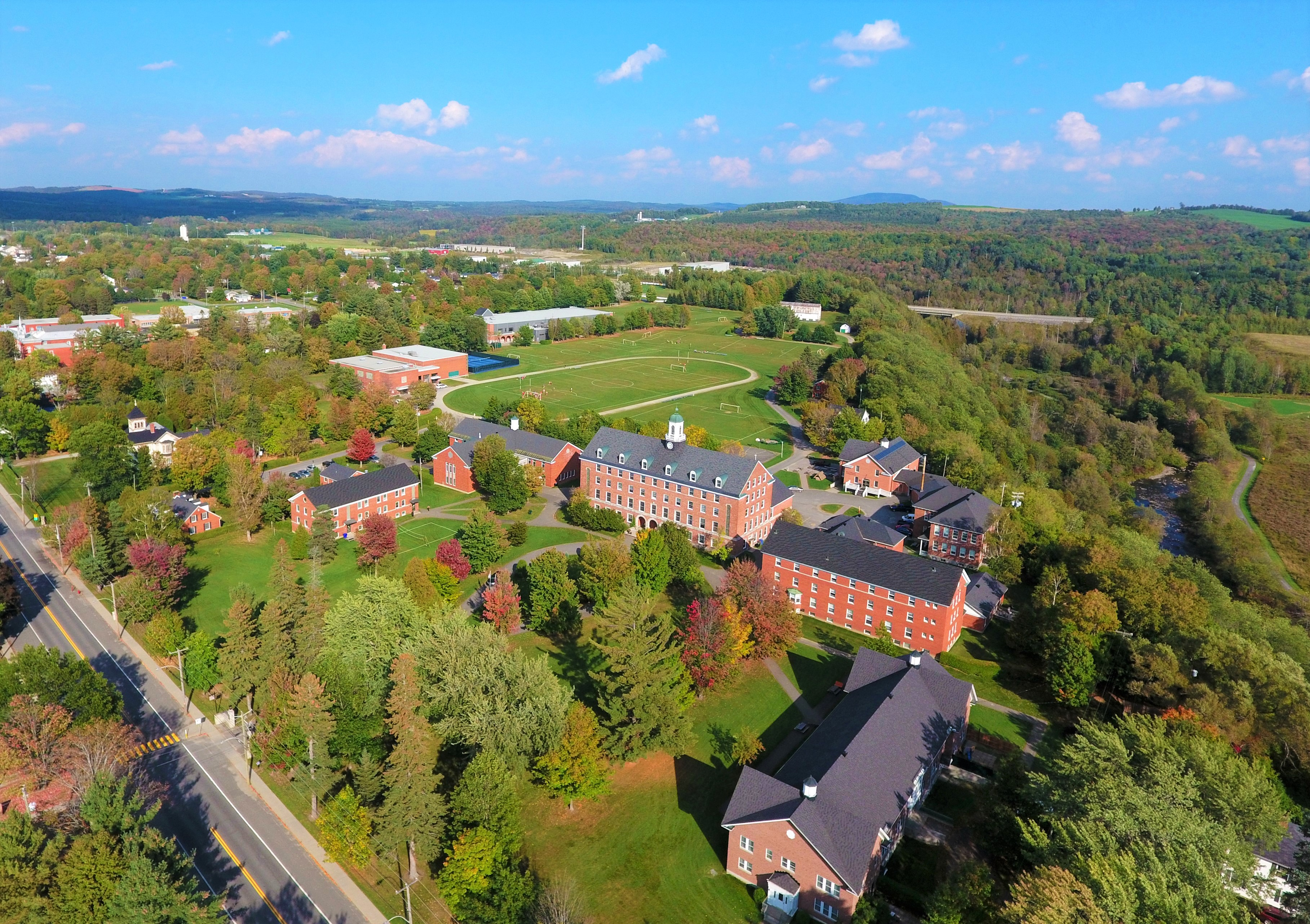

Location
- 450 Dufferin Street; Stanstead, Quebec, J0B 3E0; Canada; 45.0118°N 72.0947°W

Information
- School type: Independent, day and boarding, university-preparatory high school
- Established: December 24, 1872
- Head of School: Suzy McDonald
- Faculty: 42
- Grades: 7 - 12
- Gender: Coeducational
- Enrollment: 308
- Language: English, French
- Campus: 600 acres (2.4 km^{2})
- Colours: Red and White
- Nickname: Spartans
- Newspaper: Red & White
- Tuition: $72,000 CAD (Canada/US) $90,000 CAD (International) $29,500 CAD (Day)
- Website: www.stansteadcollege.com

Stanstead College is an English-language independent boarding school in Stanstead, Quebec, Canada, for boys and girls in Grades 7 through 12. The school is located on a 600-acre (2.4 km^{2}) campus in Quebec's Eastern Townships – just north of the Canada–United States border – and enrolls 280-310 students.

The school was established in 1872 as Stanstead Wesleyan College. The school was founded as a co-educational school. In 1959 it became 'boys only.' In 1979, the school returned to its original co-educational status.

== History ==
In June 1871, the Wesleyan Conference of Canada selected what was then Stanstead Plain, Quebec, as the location of its new college for the Eastern Townships.

Construction of the school began in fall 1872, with official incorporation of Stanstead Wesleyan College taking place on December 24, 1872. First classes were not held, however, until January 1874, with Rev. A. Lee Holmes serving as the first principal.

Initially the school was financed through the sale of shares and tuition. However, due to the slow sales of shares and low tuition, the stockholders transferred the property of Stanstead Wesleyan College to the Montreal Conference of the Methodist Church of Canada in December 1876. Association with the Methodist Church of Canada (and later the United Church of Canada) continued until the 1980s, with the school reincorporating as a fully independent and non-denominational Stanstead College in September 2002.

In addition to providing education to boarding students, Stanstead Wesleyan College served as the local Protestant high school. In 1903, the Holmes Model School was opened, serving as the local grade school until Sunnyside School opened in 1952.

The college also operated the Bugbee Business College and the Eastern Townships Conservatory of Music until 1958.

In 1938, a fire destroyed the college's main building. Its replacement, Colby House, opened in 1940.

During World War II, Stanstead College hosted a number of evacuees from Oldfeld School in Swanage, Dorset.

In 1951, Pierce Hall was destroyed by fire.

In 1959, Stanstead College became an all-boys residential school and remained so until 1979.

In 1977, after Quebec adopted Bill 101, Stanstead College became fully independent by choosing to no longer accept subsidies from the Quebec government. The decision allowed the school to continue admitting students without certificates of eligibility.

In 2001, the school’s Rec Hall was destroyed by fire; it was replaced eight months later by the new Eric T. Webster Student Centre.

Working in collaboration with the Town of Stanstead and with grants from the federal and provincial governments, the college opened the Pat Burns Arena in September 2011.

In September 2019, the school opened Cowen House, a co-ed Grade 12 residence, with boys and girls living in separate wings with a shared common area.

In fall 2022, construction began on a new junior girls' residence to accommodate an increased enrolment in younger girls partly due to the addition of a second girls' hockey team in 2021. In addition, construction began on a new wellness centre to replace the outdated health centre.

== Facilities ==
There are five residences on campus for boarding students: Davis House (boys Grades 10-11); Webster House (girls Grades 10-11 ); Bugbee House (boys Grades 7-9); Wolfe House (girls Grades 7-9) and Cowen House (boys and girls Grade 12). Cowen House is a co-ed residence, with boys and girls living in separate wings with a shared common area. .

The central building on campus is Colby Hall, which houses administrative offices, the school library, the Admissions Department, as well as classrooms on the second to fifth floors; in the past, it has also served as a residence. The campus also includes the LeBaron Dining Hall, the W. John Mackay Gymnasium, the Amaron Gymnasium, the Pat Burns Arena, Pierce Hall, Holmes Model School, Centenary Church (purchased by the school in 2015), a health centre, a physio clinic, Alumni House, faculty housing, athletic fields and numerous academic facilities.

== Athletics ==
Involvement in the athletics program is mandatory in all three terms for all students, in accordance with their age, ability and interests. The teams of Stanstead College are called the Spartans. Despite being a small school, Stanstead College fields a number of interscholastic teams and has achieved success at the regional, provincial and national level. Fall sports offered include ice hockey, soccer, cross-country running, ultimate frisbee, co-ed volleyball, badminton, and outdoor pursuits. Winter sports include ice hockey, basketball, squash, curling, skiing and yoga, girls' volleyball, and swimming. Spring sports include rugby, lacrosse, tennis, softball, golf, badminton, volleyball, and track.

In 2014, the senior girls' soccer team won the school's first-ever Canadian Accredited Independent Schools (CAIS) national tournament title at Bishop's College School.

The senior boys' basketball team won three consecutive Visser Provincial Basketball Tournaments in 2014, 2015, and 2016. The senior girls' basketball team won the MacLeod Provincial Basketball Tournament for the first time ever in 2017, repeating in 2018 and 2019.

=== Ice hockey ===
The school also operates an elite varsity ice hockey program for boys and girls. Unique among the other sports at Stanstead College, varsity ice hockey spans two terms, both fall and winter. The boys compete in the Canadian Prep School Hockey Association (CPSHA) – winning their league and playoff championships in 2022 and 2024 – as well as the Canadian Sport School Hockey League (CSSHL). The girls competed in the North American Prep Hockey Association – winning their league and playoff championships in 2016, 2017, 2018, 2019 and 2020 – and now play in the Junior Women's Hockey League (JWHL). The school also hosts competitive boy's and girl's prep teams as well as U15 and U18 teams.

At the 2012 NHL entry draft, Stanstead College senior Mark Jankowski was drafted in the first round, 21st overall, by the Calgary Flames. Czech women's national ice hockey team player Michaela Pejzlová attended Stanstead College for two years, in 2014–2016.
