= List of Minnesota Whitecaps records =

This is a list of franchise records for the Minnesota Whitecaps during their time in the Premier Hockey Federation.

== Regular season ==
=== All players ===
==== Points ====
Source.

Regular season points leaders
Player	Country	Pos	GP	Pts
Jonna Albers	(United States)	F	85	100
Allie Thunstrom	(United States)	F	64	66
Amanda Boulier	(United States)	F	62	48
Audra Morrison	(United States)	F	48	39
Sydney Baldwin	(United States)	F	47	30

==== Goals ====
Source.

Regular season goals leaders
Player	Country	Pos	GP	G
Allie Thunstrom	(United States)	F	64	47
Jonna Albers	(United States)	F	85	42
Audra Morrison	(United States)	F	48	20
Sydney Baldwin	(United States)	D	47	13
Amanda Boulier	(United States)	D	62	11
Meaghan Pezon	(United States)	F	53	11
Nicole Schammel	(United States)	F	39	11

==== Assists ====
Source.

Regular season assists leaders
Player	Country	Pos	GP	A
Jonna Albers	(United States)	F	85	58
Amanda Boulier	(United States)	D	62	37
Allie Thunstrom	(United States)	F	64	19
Audra Morrison	(United States)	F	48	19
Meaghan Pezon	(United States)	F	53	18

==== Games played ====
Source.

Regular season games played leaders
Player	Country	Pos	GP
Jonna Albers	(United States)	F	85
Stephanie Anderson	(United States)	LW	65
Allie Thunstrom	(United States)	F	64
Amanda Boulier	(United States)	D	62
Chelsey Brodt-Rosenthal	(United States)	D	60

==== Penalty minutes ====
Source.

Regular season PIM leaders
Player	Country	Pos	GP	PIM
Chelsey Brodt-Rosenthal	(United States)	D	60	56
Jonna Albers	(United States)	F	85	52
Emma Stauber	(United States)	D	58	46
Stephanie Anderson	(United States)	LW	65	44
Amanda Boulier	(United States)	D	62	36
Sydney Baldwin	(United States)	D	47	36

==== Game-winning goals ====
Player	Ctry	Pos	GP	GWG
Allie Thunstrom	(United States)	F	44	3
Haylea Schmid	(United States)	F	44	3
Audra Morrison	(United States)	F	44	2
Jonna Curtis	(United States)	F	44	2
Meaghan Pezon	(United States)	F	44	2
Nicole Schammel	(United States)	F	22	2

==== Power-play goals ====
Player	Ctry	Pos	GP	PPG
Jonna Curtis	(United States)	F	44	4
Meghan Lorence	(United States)	F	44	4
Sydney Baldwin	(United States)	F	44	4
Allie Thunstrom	(United States)	F	44	3

==== Short-handed goals ====
Player	Ctry	Pos	GP	SHG
Allie Thunstrom	(United States)	F	44	2
Meghan Lorence	(United States)	F	44	2
Audra Morrison	(United States)	F	44	1
Nicole Schammel	(United States)	F	22	1

=== Defenders ===
==== Points ====
Source.

Regular season defensive points leaders
Player	Country	Pos	GP	Pts
Amanda Boulier	(United States)	D	62	48
Sydney Baldwin	(United States)	D	47	30
Patti Marshall	(United States)	D	44	19
Sidney Morin	(United States)	D	24	17
Emma Stauber	(United States)	D	58	12

=== Goaltenders ===
==== Games played ====
Source.

Goaltender regular season games played leaders
Player	Country	GP
Amanda Leveille	(Canada)	71
Jenna Brenneman	(United States)	12
Julie Friend	(United States)	10
Allie Morse	(United States)	7
Sydney Rossman	(United States)	4

==== Wins ====
Source.

Goaltender regular season wins leaders
Player	Country	Wins
Amanda Leveille	(Canada)	43
Jenna Brenneman	(United States)	2
Allie Morse	(United States)	2
Julie Friend	(United States)	1
Breanna Blesi	(United States)	1

==== Shutouts ====
Source.

Goaltender regular season shutouts leaders
Player	Country	SO
Amanda Leveille	(Canada)	7
Julie Friend	(United States)	1

==== Goals against average ====
Source.

Regular season goals against average leaders
Player	Country	GAA
Allie Morse	(United States)	1.97
Amanda Leveille	(Canada)	2.24
Breanna Blesi	(United States)	3.32
Jenna Brenneman	(United States)	3.40
Julie Friend	(United States)	3.77

==== Save percentage ====
Source.

Regular season save percentage leaders
Player	Country	Sv%
Amanda Leveille	(Canada)	0.930
Breanna Blesi	(United States)	0.904
Jenna Brenneman	(United States)	0.902
Chantal Burke	(Canada)	0.889
Allie Morse	(United States)	0.885

== Playoffs ==
=== All players ===
==== Points ====
Source.

Playoff points leaders
Player	Country	Pos	GP	Pts
Jonna Albers	(United States)	F	10	15
Allie Thunstrom	(United States)	F	7	8
Audra Morrison	(United States)	F	5	6
Patti Marshall	(United States)	D	5	5
Meaghan Pezon	(United States)	F	6	4
Sydney Baldwin	(United States)	D	7	4

==== Goals ====
Source.

Playoff goals leaders
Player	Country	Pos	GP	G
Allie Thunstrom	(United States)	F	7	7
Jonna Albers	(United States)	F	10	5
Audra Morrison	(United States)	F	5	4
Hannah Brandt	(United States)	C	2	2
Brittyn Fleming	(United States)	LW	3	2

==== Assists ====
Source.

Playoff assists leaders
Player	Country	Pos	GP	A
Jonna Albers	(United States)	F	10	10
Patti Marshall	(United States)	D	5	5
Audra Morrison	(United States)	F	5	4
Meaghan Pezon	(United States)	F	6	3
Sydney Baldwin	(United States)	D	7	3
Nina Rodgers	(United States)	F	2	3
Liz Schepers	(United States)	C/LW	3	3

==== Games played ====
Source.

Playoff games played leaders
Player	Country	Pos	GP
Jonna Albers	(United States)	F	10
Emma Stauber	(United States)	D	9
Amanda Boulier	(United States)	D	8
Stephanie Anderson	(United States)	LW	8
Allie Thunstrom	(United States)	F	7
Sydney Baldwin	(United States)	D	7
Winny Brodt-Brown	(United States)	D	7
Chelsey Brodt-Rosenthal	(United States)	D	7

==== Penalty minutes ====
Source.

Playoff penalty minutes leaders
Player	Country	Pos	GP	PIM
Jonna Albers	(United States)	F	10	4
Patti Marshall	(United States)	D	5	4
Lauren Kapetanovic	(United States)	F	4	4
Lisa Martinson	(United States)	D	5	4
Chelsey Brodt-Rosenthal	(United States)	D	7	4

==== Game-winning goals ====
Player	Ctry	Pos	GP	GWG
Allie Thunstrom	(United States)	F	5	1
Haylea Schmid	(United States)	F	3	1

==== Power-play goals ====
Player	Ctry	Pos	GP	PPG
Meaghan Pezon	(United States)	F	4	1

==== Short-handed goals ====
The Whitecaps have not scored any short-handed goals in the playoffs.

=== Defenders ===
==== Points ====
Source.

Playoff defensive points leaders
Player	Country	Pos	GP	Pts
Patti Marshall	(United States)	D	5	5
Sydney Baldwin	(United States)	D	7	4
Lee Stecklein	(United States)	D	2	2
Sidney Morin	(United States)	D	3	2
Amanda Boulier	(United States)	D	8	2
Winny Brodt-Brown	(United States)	D	7	2

=== Goaltenders ===
==== Games played ====
Source.

Goaltender playoff games played leaders
Player	Country	GP
Amanda Leveille	(Canada)	10

==== Wins ====
Source.

Goaltender playoff wins leaders
Player	Country	Wins
Amanda Leveille	(Canada)	7

==== Shutouts ====
Source.

Goaltender playoff shutouts leaders
Player	Country	SO
Amanda Leveille	(Canada)	2

==== Goals against average ====
Source.

Goaltender playoff goals against average leaders
Player	Country	GAA
Amanda Leveille	(Canada)	1.78

==== Save percentage ====
Source.

Goaltender playoff save percentage leaders
Player	Country	SV%
Amanda Leveille	(Canada)	0.949

== Franchise records ==
=== Franchise single season ===
Franchise Single Season Records
Most points	36	2019–20^{a}
Most wins	17	2019–20
Most losses	13	2021–22^{b}
Most overtime losses	3	2022–23^{c}
Most goals for	106	2019–20
Most goals against	66	2022–23
Fewest points	24	2018–19^{d}
Fewest wins	6	2021–22
Fewest losses	4	2018–19
Fewest overtime losses	0	2018–19
Fewest goals for	53	2018–19
Fewest goals against	34	2018–19
Most penalty minutes	202	2021–22
Fewest penalty minutes	118	2018–19
Most shutouts	3	2019–20

==== Notes ====
1. The 2020–21 season is excluded from records because it was abbreviated due to the COVID-19 pandemic.
2. ^a The 2019–20 season had 24 games per team.
3. ^b The 2021–22 season had 20 games per team.
4. ^c The 2022–23 season had 24 games per team. Also, during this season, the PHF started awarding three points for a win.
5. ^d The 2018–19 season had 16 games per team.

== See also ==
- PHF awards
- List of Boston Pride records
- List of Buffalo Beauts records
- List of Connecticut Whale (PHF) records
- List of PHF records (individual)
