= 2021–22 Minnesota Whitecaps season =

Premier Hockey Federation team season

2021–22 Minnesota Whitecaps
- League: 5 PHF
- 2021–22 record: 6–13–1
- Home record: 3–6–1
- Road record: 3–7–0
- Goals for: 52
- Goals against: 64

Team information
- General manager: Jack Brodt
- Coach: Jack Brodt; Ronda Curtin Engelhardt
- Assistant coach: Amber Hegland
- Captain: Winny Brodt-Brown
- Alternate captains: Jonna Curtis; Allie Thunstrom; Brooke White-Lancette
- Arena: TRIA Rink

Team leaders
- Goals: Allie Thunstrom (18)
- Assists: Jonna Curtis (15)
- Points: Jonna Curtis (24)
- Penalty minutes: Stephanie Anderson, Chelsey Brodt-Rosenthal (24)
- Plus/minus: Taylor Turnquist (+15)
- Wins: Amanda Leveille (4)
- Goals against average: Amanda Leveille (2.38)

The 2021–22 Minnesota Whitecaps season was the team's fourth year as a member of the Premier Hockey Federation. They play their home games at TRIA Rink, the practice facility for the NHL's Minnesota Wild. The Whitecaps opened the season on the weekend of November 6–7 in Boston playing against the Pride, dropping their first two games. Their first home game, on November 20, 2021, led to their first win of the season, also against the Pride.

== Background ==
On June 28, 2021, the PHF announced the sale of the Buffalo Beauts and the Whitecaps to a joint partnership of NLTT Ventures, LLC, led by Andy Scurto, and Top Tier Sports, led by Neil Leibman. Leibman was named the team's governor.

== Schedule and results ==
The regular season schedule was published on August 5, 2021.

=== News and notes ===
On December 10, 2021, the PHF announced that the December 11 and 12 games against the Buffalo Beauts had been cancelled due to inclement weather conditions affecting Buffalo's travel. On December 16, 2021, those games were rescheduled for February 5 and 6, 2022. On January 5, 2022, the PHF announced that all regular season games for the weekend of January 8 and 9, affecting the Whitecaps' games against the Toronto Six, were postponed due to COVID-19.

=== Regular season ===
Schedule
Regular season schedule (home: 3–6–1; road: 3–7–0)

Game	Date	Opponent	Score	OT	Decision	Location	Record	Points	Box score/recap
1	November 6	@ Boston Pride	4–6		Leveille	Warrior Ice Arena	0–1–0	0	Recap
2	November 7	@ Boston Pride	0–1		Leveille	Warrior Ice Arena	0–2–0	0	Recap
3	November 20	Boston Pride	2–0		Leveille	TRIA Rink	1–2–0	3	Recap
4	November 21	Boston Pride	1–2	OT	Leveille	TRIA Rink	1–2–1	4	Recap
5	December 4	@ Connecticut Whale	1–5		Leveille	Danbury Ice Arena	1–3–1	4	Recap
6	December 5	@ Connecticut Whale	2–4		Leveille	Danbury Ice Arena	1–4–1	4	Recap
—	December 11	Buffalo Beauts	–	Postponed due to inclement weather					
—	December 12	Buffalo Beauts	–	Postponed due to inclement weather					
7	December 18	Toronto Six	0–4		Leveille	TRIA Rink	1–5–1	4	Recap
8	December 19	Toronto Six	1–2		Leveille	Roseville Ice Arena	1–6–1	4	Recap
—	January 8	@ Toronto Six	–	Postponed due to COVID-19 pandemic					
—	January 9	@ Toronto Six	–	Postponed due to COVID-19 pandemic					
9	January 22	@ Buffalo Beauts	3–1		Leveille	Northtown Center	2–6–1	7	Recap
10	January 23	@ Buffalo Beauts	6–1		Leveille	Northtown Center	3–6–1	10	Recap
11	February 5	Buffalo Beauts	8–1		Leveille	TRIA Rink	4–6–1	13	Rescheduled; Recap
12	February 6	Buffalo Beauts	2–6		Brenneman	TRIA Rink	4–7–1	13	Rescheduled; Recap
13	February 12	@ Toronto Six	2–6		Brenneman	Canlan Ice Sports – York	4–8–1	13	Rescheduled; Recap
14	February 13	@ Toronto Six	1–2		Brenneman	Canlan Ice Sports – York	4–9–1	13	Rescheduled; Recap
15	February 19	Metropolitan Riveters	5–2		Brenneman	TRIA Rink	5–9–1	16	Recap
16	February 20	Metropolitan Riveters	4–7		Friend	TRIA Rink	5–10–1	16	Recap
17	March 5	Connecticut Whale	2–4		Brenneman	TRIA Rink	5–11–1	16	Recap
18	March 6	Connecticut Whale	1–4		Blesi	TRIA Rink	5–12–1	16	Recap
19	March 12	@ Metropolitan Riveters	4–2		Blesi	Prudential Center Practice Facility	6–12–1	19	Recap
20	March 13	@ Metropolitan Riveters	3–4		Blesi	Prudential Center Practice Facility	6–13–1	19	Recap

Regulation win (3 points) Overtime/shootout win (2 points) Overtime/shootout loss (1 point) Regulation loss (0 points)

=== Playoffs ===
The 5th-seeded Whitecaps defeated the 4th-seeded Metropolitan Riveters in the first round of the 2022 Isobel Cup Playoffs by a score of 4–1 on Friday, March 25. They advanced to play the #1 seed Connecticut Whale in the Semifinal game to be held on Sunday, March 27.

2022 Isobel Cup Playoffs
Playoff schedule (1–1–0)

Game	Date	Opponent	Score	OT	Decision	Location	Box score/recap
1	March 25	Metropolitan Riveters	4–1		Leveille	AdventHealth Center Ice	Box score
2	March 27	Connecticut Whale	2–4		Leveille	AdventHealth Center Ice	Box score

== Player statistics ==
As of March 27, 2022

=== Skaters ===
	Regular season						Playoffs					
Player	GP	G	A	Pts	+/−	PIM	GP	G	A	Pts	+/−	PIM
Jonna Curtis	20	9	15	24	+12	18	2	0	3	3	+3	0
Allie Thunstrom	20	18	3	21	+12	4	2	2	0	2	+1	0
Audra Morrison	20	10	5	15	+10	21	2	1	2	3	+3	0
Ashleigh Brykaliuk	20	3	11	14	+7	16	2	1	0	1	+2	0
Taylor Turnquist	19	2	9	11	+15	10	2	1	0	1	+2	0
Haley Mack	17	4	5	9	+3	2	2	0	2	2	+1	0
Patti Marshall	20	0	7	7	+3	6	2	0	2	2	+3	2
Lexie Laing	20	2	4	6	+1	10	2	0	0	0	–1	0
Meaghan Pezon	12	1	4	5	+5	0	2	0	0	0	–1	0
Emma Stauber	15	1	2	3	0	14	2	0	0	0	–1	0
Mak Langei	20	0	3	3	-6	8	2	0	0	0	+1	0
Sydney Baldwin	2	1	1	2	+2	4	2	1	2	3	+3	0
Alex Woken	20	1	1	2	-5	7	2	0	0	0	–1	0
Stephanie Anderson	15	0	2	2	–1	24	2	0	0	0	0	0
Chelsey Brodt-Rosenthal	20	0	2	2	+2	24	2	0	0	0	–1	2
Maddie Rowe	20	0	2	2	-3	8	2	0	0	0	+1	0
Sara Bustad	9	0	1	1	+1	2	2	0	0	0	0	0
Haylea Schmid	11	0	1	1	0	2	2	0	0	0	0	0
Brooke White-Lancette	3	0	0	0	0	0	1	0	0	0	0	0
Jenna Brenneman	5	0	0	0	0	0	–	–	–	–	–	–
Lisa Martinson	6	0	0	0	0	4	1	0	0	0	0	0
Meghan Lorence	7	0	0	0	-3	2	1	0	0	0	0	0
Winny Brodt-Brown	11	0	0	0	-1	4	2	0	0	0	0	0
Nicole Schammel	17	0	0	0	–2	2	1	0	0	0	0	0

=== Goaltenders ===
	Regular season																Playoffs															
Player	GP	W	L	T	OT	TOI	SA	GA	SV%	GAA	SO	Sv	PIM	G	A	GS	GP	W	L	T	OT	TOI	SA	GA	SV%	GAA	SO	Sv	PIM	G	A	GS
Amanda Leveille	12	4	6	0	1	630:11	395	25	.937	2.38	1	370	0	0	1	11	2	1	1	0	0	118:53	68	5	.926	2.52	0	63	0	0	0	2
Jenna Brenneman	12	1	4	0	0	309:00	189	19	.899	3.69	0	170	0	0	0	5	2	0	0	0	0	0:00	0	0	.000	0.00	0	0	0	0	0	0
Julie Friend	3	0	1	0	0	59:38	36	6	.833	6.04	0	30	0	0	0	1	1	0	0	0	0	0:00	0	0	.000	0.00	0	0	0	0	0	0
Allie Morse	1	0	0	0	0	00:00	0	0	.000	0.00	0	0	0	0	0	0	1	0	0	0	0	0:00	0	0	.000	0.00	0	0	0	0	0	0
Breanna Blesi	4	1	2	0	0	199:00	115	11	.904	3.32	0	104	0	0	0	3	1	0	0	0	0	0:00	0	0	.000	0.00	0	0	0	0	0	0

Bold/italics denotes franchise record.

== Awards and honors ==
=== Milestones ===
Regular season
Player	Milestone	Reached
Allie Thunstrom	50th PHF career point	November 6, 2021
Jonna Curtis	60th PHF career point	December 5, 2021
Allie Thunstrom	50th PHF career game	December 5, 2021

=== Honors ===
- Allie Thunstrom was named the February PHF Player of the Month.

== Transactions ==
=== Signings ===
Date	Player	Previous team
September 22, 2021	Allie Thunstrom	Minnesota Whitecaps
September 23, 2021	Audra Morrison	Minnesota Whitecaps
September 24, 2021	Jonna Curtis	Minnesota Whitecaps
September 27, 2021	Mak Langei	Bemidji State Beavers
September 28, 2021	Ashleigh Brykaliuk	Vanke Rays
October 5, 2021	Patti Marshall	Brynäs IF
October 5, 2021	Alex Woken	Mad Dogs Mannheim
October 6, 2021	Taylor Turnquist	Boston Pride
October 7, 2021	Nicole Schammel	Professional Women's Hockey Players Association
October 8, 2021	Meghan Lorence	Minnesota Whitecaps
October 12, 2021	Meaghan Pezon	Minnesota Whitecaps
October 19, 2021	Maddie Rowe	Minnesota Whitecaps
October 19, 2021	Sara Bustad	Minnesota Whitecaps
October 20, 2021	Stephanie Anderson	Minnesota Whitecaps
October 20, 2021	Haley Mack	Minnesota Whitecaps
October 21, 2021	Brooke White-Lancette	Minnesota Whitecaps
October 22, 2021	Haylea Schmid	Minnesota Whitecaps
November 1, 2021	Winny Brodt-Brown	Minnesota Whitecaps
November 1, 2021	Chelsey Brodt-Rosenthal	Minnesota Whitecaps
November 2, 2021	Lexie Laing	Boston Pride
November 3, 2021	Emma Stauber	Minnesota Whitecaps
November 3, 2021	Lisa Martinson	Minnesota Whitecaps
November 4, 2021	Jenna Brenneman	Minnesota Golden Gophers
November 4, 2021	Amanda Leveille	Minnesota Whitecaps

== Draft picks ==
Below are the Minnesota Whitecaps' selections at the 2021 NWHL Draft, which was held on June 29, 2021.

Round	#	Player	Pos	Nationality	College/junior/club team (league)
1	6	Mak Langei	D	United States	Bemidji State Beavers
2	12	Tina Kampa	D	United States	Bemidji State Beavers
3	18	Taylor Wente	F	United States	Minnesota Golden Gophers
4	24	Jenna Brenneman	G	United States	Penn State Nittany Lions
5	30	Kendall Williamson	F	United States	Colgate Raiders
