= 2022–23 Minnesota Whitecaps season =

2022–23 Minnesota Whitecaps
- League: 3 PHF
- 2022–23 record: 10–11–3
- Home record: 3–8–1
- Road record: 7–3–1
- Goals for: 58
- Goals against: 66

Team information
- General manager: Chi-Yin Tse
- Coach: Ronda Curtin Engelhardt
- Assistant coach: Amber Hegland
- Captain: Sydney Brodt
- Alternate captains: Jonna Albers; Sidney Morin; Sydney Baldwin
- Arena: Richfield Ice Arena

Team leaders
- Goals: Natalie Snodgrass; Jonna Albers (10)
- Assists: 4 tied at (10)
- Points: Natalie Snodgrass; Jonna Albers (20)
- Penalty minutes: Olivia Knowles (20)
- Wins: Amanda Leveille (9)
- Goals against average: Amanda Leveille (2.43)

The 2022–23 Minnesota Whitecaps season is the team's fifth year as a member of the Premier Hockey Federation. Before this season, they moved to their new home rink at Richfield Ice Arena. The Whitecaps started the season on Saturday, November 5 at Canlan Ice Sports – York, losing to the Toronto Six in overtime.

== Offseason ==
On May 17, 2022, the Whitecaps announced that Jack Brodt, who co-founded the team in 2004, would take a position with NLTT Hockey, the company who bought the Whitecaps in the previous season. Ronda Curtin Engelhardt took over as sole head coach of the team.

On July 29, 2022, the Whitecaps announced that they would move from TRIA Rink to Richfield Ice Arena.

On August 21, 2022, Chi-Yin Tse was named as the new general manager for the Whitecaps.

== Schedule and results ==
=== Standings ===
Pos	Team	Pld	W	OTW	OTL	L	GF	GA	GD	Pts	
1	Boston Pride	24	15	4	1	4	92	52	+40	54	Playoffs
2	Toronto Six	24	15	2	2	5	87	62	+25	51	Playoffs
3	Connecticut Whale	24	13	1	2	8	83	66	+17	43	Playoffs
4	Minnesota Whitecaps	24	10	0	3	11	58	66	−8	33	Playoffs
5	Metropolitan Riveters	24	8	3	0	13	64	79	−15	30	
6	Montreal Force	24	5	3	2	14	56	70	−14	23	
7	Buffalo Beauts	24	5	0	3	16	50	95	−45	18	

Updated to match(es) played on March 5, 2023. Source: PHF (Note: A win in regulation time is awarded 3 points, 2 points are awarded for an overtime/shootout win, 1 point is awarded for an overtime/shootout loss, 0 points are awarded for a regulation loss) (Note: Tiebreaker order is: points, head-to-head record, regulation wins, wins, goal difference)

=== Regular season ===
The regular season schedule was published on Monday, September 19, 2022. All times shown as US Central time.

Regular season schedule (home: 3–8–1; road: 7–3–2)
November: 0–2–2, 2 points (home: 0–1–1; road: 0–1–1)

Game	Date	Opponent	Score	OT	Decision	Location	Record	Points	Box score/recap
1	November 5	@ Toronto Six	2–3	OT	Leveille	Canlan Ice Sports – York	0–0–1	1	
2	November 6	@ Toronto Six	2–3		Leveille	Canlan Ice Sports – York	0–1–1	1	
3	November 18	Boston Pride	0–2		Leveille	Richfield Ice Arena	0–2–1	1	
4	November 19	Boston Pride	4–5	OT	Leveille	Richfield Ice Arena	0–2–2	2	

December 4–2–0, 12 points (home: 3–1–0; road: 1–1–0)

Game	Date	Opponent	Score	OT	Decision	Location	Record	Points	Box score/recap
5	December 3	Metropolitan Riveters	4–3		Leveille	Richfield Ice Arena	1–2–2	5	
6	December 4	Metropolitan Riveters	4–1		Leveille	Richfield Ice Arena	2–2–2	8	
7	December 9	@ Connecticut Whale	0–2		Leveille	International Skating Center of CT	2–3–2	8	
8	December 10	@ Connecticut Whale	4–3		Leveille	International Skating Center of CT	3–3–2	11	
9	December 17	Montreal Force	5–2		Leveille	Richfield Ice Arena	4–3–2	14	
10	December 18	Montreal Force	1–4		Leveille	Richfield Ice Arena	4–4–2	14	

January 4–0–0, 12 points (home: 0–0–0; road: 4–0–0)

Game	Date	Opponent	Score	OT	Decision	Location	Record	Points	Box score/recap
11	January 7	@ Buffalo Beauts	4–1		Brenneman	Northtown Center	5–4–2	17	
12	January 8	@ Buffalo Beauts	5–3		Leveille	Northtown Center	6–4–2	20	
13	January 14	@ Metropolitan Riveters	3–2		Leveille	The Rink at American Dream	7–4–2	23	
14	January 15	@ Metropolitan Riveters	4–1		Leveille	The Rink at American Dream	8–4–2	26	

February 2–4–0, 6 points (home: 0–4–0; road: 2–0–0)

Game	Date	Opponent	Score	OT	Decision	Location	Record	Points	Box score/recap
–	February 4	@ Montreal Force				Arena regional de la riviere-du-Nord			Postponed due to inclement weather; rescheduled for February 6.
15	February 5	@ Montreal Force	4–1		Leveille	Arena regional de la riviere-du-Nord	9–4–2	29	
16	February 6	@ Montreal Force	3–2		Leveille	Arena regional de la riviere-du-Nord	10–4–2	32	Rescheduled from February 4.
17	February 18	Buffalo Beauts	2–4		Brenneman	Richfield Ice Arena	10–5–2	32	
18	February 19	Buffalo Beauts	0–1		Brenneman	Richfield Ice Arena	10–6–2	32	
19	February 25	Toronto Six	0–1		Brenneman	Richfield Ice Arena	10–7–2	32	
20	February 26	Toronto Six	1–7		Brenneman	Richfield Ice Arena	10–8–2	32	

March 0–3–1, 1 point (home: 0–2–0; road: 0–1–1)

Game	Date	Opponent	Score	OT	Decision	Location	Record	Points	Box score/recap
21	March 3	@ Boston Pride	4–5	SO	Brenneman	Warrior Ice Arena	10–8–3	33	
22	March 4	@ Boston Pride	1–5		Brenneman	Warrior Ice Arena	10–9–3	33	
23	March 11	Connecticut Whale	0–3		Leveille	Richfield Ice Arena	10–10–3	33	
24	March 12	Connecticut Whale	1–3		Leveille	Richfield Ice Arena	10–11–3	33	

Regulation win (3 points) Overtime/shootout win (2 points) Overtime/shootout loss (1 point) Regulation loss (0 points)

=== Playoffs ===
The Whitecaps ended the regular season as the fourth-ranked team in the league. This earned them the final playoff spot, with their first playoff series against the first-place Boston Pride starting on Thursday, March 16 at Bentley Arena in Waltham, Massachusetts.

2023 Isobel Cup Playoffs
Playoff schedule (2–1–0)

Game	Date	Opponent	Score	OT	Decision	Location	Box score/recap
1	March 16	Boston Pride	5–2		Leveille	Bentley Arena	
2	March 18	Boston Pride	4–1		Leveille	Bentley Arena	
3	March 26	Toronto Six	4–3	OT	Leveille	Mullett Arena	

== Player statistics ==
As of March 26, 2023.

=== Skaters ===
Player	Regular season						Playoffs
Player	GP	G	A	Pts	SOG	PIM	GP	G	A	Pts	SOG	PIM
Natalie Snodgrass	22	10	10	20	82	4	3	1	2	3	16	0
Jonna Albers	24	10	10	20	82	12	3	5	1	6	16	0
Sidney Morin	24	7	10	17	98	4	3	1	1	2	5	0
Liz Schepers	22	6	8	14	51	10	3	0	3	3	9	2
Patti Marshall	24	2	10	12	26	4	3	0	3	3	2	2
Sydney Brodt	21	5	4	9	58	17	3	1	0	1	11	2
Denisa Křížová	24	5	4	9	63	8	3	0	2	2	5	2
Brittyn Fleming	24	3	6	9	46	2	3	2	0	2	7	2
Amanda Boulier	24	0	8	8	32	10	3	0	0	0	0	0
Sydney Baldwin	24	3	4	7	54	14	3	0	1	1	2	0
Ashleigh Brykaliuk	24	1	3	4	30	14	3	0	0	0	1	0
Brooke Madsen	24	2	1	3	24	6	3	1	0	1	4	0
Anna Klein	23	1	2	3	17	2	3	0	0	0	4	0
Olivia Knowles	24	1	2	3	23	20	3	0	1	1	1	2
Stephanie Anderson	24	1	2	3	28	8	3	0	0	0	3	0
Taylor Wente	8	1	0	1	6	6	3	0	1	1	2	2
Maddie Rowe	18	0	1	1	3	6	2	0	0	0	0	0
Ronja Mogren	24	0	1	1	18	2	3	1	0	1	2	0
Emma Stauber	14	0	0	0	10	2	3	0	0	0	1	0
Meaghan Pezon	4	0	0	0	0	0	0	0	0	0	0	0

=== Goaltenders ===
Player	Regular season																Playoffs
Player	GP	W	L	T	OT	TOI	SA	GA	SV%	GAA	SO	Sv	PIM	G	A	GS	GP	W	L	T	OT	TOI	SA	GA	SV%	GAA	SO	Sv	PIM	G	A	GS
Amanda Leveille	17	9	6	0	2	1012:56	533	41	.923	2.43	0	492	0	0	0	17	3	2	0	0	1	184:23	119	7	.941	2.28	0	112	0	0	0	3
Jenna Brenneman	7	1	5	0	1	396:29	221	21	.905	3.18	0	200	2	0	1	7	0	0	0	0	0	00:00	0	0	.000	0.00	0	0	0	0	0	0
Chantal Burke	1	0	0	0	0	20:00	18	2	.889	6.00	0	16	0	0	0	0	0	0	0	0	0	00:00	0	0	.000	0.00	0	0	0	0	0	0

Bold/italics denotes franchise record.

== Awards and honors ==
Three Stars of the Week

- For the weekend of December 3–4, Sydney Brodt was named Third Star of the Week in the PHF.
- For the weekend of December 16–18, Natalie Snodgrass was named First Star of the Week in the PHF.
- For the weekend of January 14–15, Jonna Albers was named Third Star of the Week in the PHF.
- On May 4, 2023, Denisa Křížová was announced as the Whitecaps' PHF Foundation Award winner.

=== Milestones ===
Regular season
Player	Milestone	Reached
Natalie Snodgrass	First career PHF goal First career PHF assist	November 5, 2022
Sidney Morin	First career PHF goal	November 5, 2022
Liz Schepers	First career PHF goal	November 6, 2022
Liz Schepers	First career PHF assist	November 19, 2022
Anna Klein	First career PHF goal	November 19, 2022
Sidney Morin	First career PHF assist	December 3, 2022
Brittyn Fleming	First career PHF assist	December 3, 2022
Olivia Knowles	First career PHF assist	December 10, 2022
Natalie Snodgrass	First career PHF hat-trick	December 17, 2022
Olivia Knowles	First career PHF goal	December 17, 2022
Ronja Mogren	First career PHF assist	December 17, 2022

== Transactions ==
=== Signings ===
Date	Player	Position	Term	Previous team
May 19, 2022	Sidney Morin	D	2 years	Ladies Team Lugano
May 23, 2022	Sydney Brodt	F	1 year	Linköping HC
May 24, 2022	Sydney Baldwin	D	1 year	Minnesota Whitecaps
May 25, 2022	Ashleigh Brykaliuk	F	2 years	Minnesota Whitecaps
May 31, 2022	Jonna Albers	F	1 year	Minnesota Whitecaps
June 15, 2022	Patti Marshall	D	1 year	Minnesota Whitecaps
June 17, 2022	Denisa Křížová	F	1 year	Brynäs IF Dam
June 23, 2022	Olivia Knowles	D	1 year	University of Minnesota
June 29, 2022	Amanda Leveille	G	1 year	Minnesota Whitecaps
July 11, 2022	Liz Schepers	F	1 year	Ohio State
July 15, 2022	Natalie Snodgrass	F	1 year	University of Connecticut
July 26, 2022	Brittyn Fleming	F	1 year	Minnesota State University
July 28, 2022	Ronja Mogren	F	1 year	Ladies Team Lugano
August 3, 2022	Anna Klein	F	1 year	Minnesota–Duluth
August 15, 2022	Stephanie Anderson	F	1 year	Minnesota Whitecaps
August 23, 2022	Meaghan Pezon	F	1 year	Minnesota Whitecaps
October 4, 2022	Jenna Breneman	G	1 year	Minnesota Whitecaps
October 4, 2022	Amanda Boulier	D	1 year	Boston Pride
October 4, 2022	Maddie Rowe	D	1 year	Minnesota Whitecaps
October 4, 2022	Emma Stauber	D	1 year	Minnesota Whitecaps
October 4, 2022	Brooke Madsen	F	1 year	Penn State
February 17, 2023	Chantal Burke	G	1 year	Penn State
February 17, 2023	Taylor Wente	F	1 year	University of Minnesota
