= 2018–19 Minnesota Whitecaps season =

2018–19 Minnesota Whitecaps
- League: 1 NWHL
- 2018–19 record: 12–4–0
- Home record: 6–2–0
- Road record: 6–2–0
- Goals for: 53
- Goals against: 34

Team information
- General manager: Jack Brodt
- Coach: Jack Brodt; Ronda Curtin Engelhardt
- Arena: TRIA Rink

The 2018–19 Minnesota Whitecaps season was the first in franchise history as a member of the National Women's Hockey League, in which the team won the Isobel Cup.

== Background ==
On May 15, 2018, the NWHL announced that it had an agreement in principle to acquire ownership of the Whitecaps. The team is expected to join the NWHL as an expansion team for the 2018–19 season. The NWHL arranged with the Minnesota Wild to use TRIA Rink, the Wild's practice facility, as the site for Whitecaps home games. It was reported that the Whitecaps had hired 2018 Olympic gold medal-winning coach Robb Stauber and his wife Shivaun Stauber as coaches, sharing the head coaching responsibilities, but the parties never signed a contract. Whitecaps' founder and general manager Jack Brodt then returned to the coaching position he held prior to joining the NWHL and hired former University of Minnesota player Ronda Curtin Engelhardt as co-coach.

The NWHL unveiled a new logo for the Whitecaps on August 21, 2018. Created by M Style Marketing, the colors incorporate blue, while, silver and black.

== Regular season ==
=== News and notes ===
- On December 29, 2018, the Whitecaps faced the Buffalo Beauts at the KeyBank Center. The event was part of a doubleheader involving both the NWHL and the NHL. After the Whitecaps vs. Beauts game, the Buffalo Sabres hosted the Boston Bruins.

=== Schedule ===
Schedule
Regular season schedule

| Date | Time | Opponent | Final | Record |
|---|---|---|---|---|
| October 6 | 6:30 pm | Metropolitan Riveters | 4–0, Whitecaps | 1–0–0 |
| October 7 | 2:00 pm | Metropolitan Riveters | 3–1, Whitecaps | 2–0–0 |
| October 20 | 2:00 pm | at Metropolitan Riveters | 5–3, Whitecaps | 3–0–0 |
| October 21 | 3:00 pm | at Metropolitan Riveters | 6–2, Whitecaps | 4–0–0 |
| October 27 | 6:30 pm | Buffalo Beauts | 3–2, Whitecaps | 5–0–0 |
| October 28 | 2:00 pm | Buffalo Beauts | 2–1, Whitecaps | 6–0–0 |
| December 1 | 6:30 pm | Boston Pride | 1–5, Pride | 6–1–0 |
| December 2 | 2:00 pm | Boston Pride | 2–7, Pride | 6–2–0 |
| December 29 | 2:00 pm | at Buffalo Beauts (KeyBank Center) | 2–1, Whitecaps | 7–2–0 |
| December 30 | 1:30 pm | at Buffalo Beauts | 0–4, Beauts | 7–3–0 |
| January 12 | 7:30 pm | at Boston Pride | 4–5, Pride | 7–4–0 |
| January 13 | 3:00 pm | at Connecticut Whale | 4–1, Whitecaps | 8–4–0 |
| January 19 | 6:30 pm | Connecticut Whale | 2–0, Whitecaps | 9–4–0 |
| January 20 | 2:00 pm | Connecticut Whale | 9–0, Whitecaps | 10–4–0 |
| March 2 | 7:30 pm | at Boston Pride | 2–1, Whitecaps | 11–4–0 |
| March 3 | 3:00 pm | at Connecticut Whale | 4–1, Whitecaps | 12–4–0 |

== Transactions ==
=== Signings ===
| Player | Date | Previous team |
|---|---|---|
| Amanda Leveille | June 18, 2018 | Buffalo Beauts |
| Hannah Brandt | June 20, 2018 | US Olympic Team |
| Lee Stecklein | June 20, 2018 | US Olympic Team |
| Kendall Coyne | July 26, 2018 | US Olympic Team |
| Allie Thunstrom | August 1, 2018 | Re-signed with Whitecaps |
| Meaghan Pezon | August 8, 2018 | Re-signed with Whitecaps |
| Amanda Boulier | August 14, 2018 | Connecticut Whale |
| Jonna Curtis | August 15, 2018 | New Hampshire Wildcats women's ice hockey |
| Brooke White-Lancette | August 17, 2018 | Re-signed with Whitecaps |
| Sydney Rossman | August 20, 2018 | Connecticut Whale |
| Lauren Barnes | August 22, 2018 | MSU-Mankato women’s ice hockey |
| Julie Friend | August 22, 2018 | DEC Salzburg Eagles (EWHL) |
| Sadie Lundquist | August 22, 2018 | Re-signed with Whitecaps |
| Amy Menke | August 22, 2018 | Djurgårdens IF (SDHL) |
| Emma Stauber | August 22, 2018 | HV-71 (SDHL) |

== Awards and honors ==
=== Regular season ===
VEDA NWHL Player of the Week

- Hannah Brandt (awarded October 8, 2018)
- Jonna Curtis (awarded October 22, 2018)
- Amanda Leveille (awarded October 29, 2018)
- Amy Menke (awarded January 14, 2019)

VEDA NWHL Stars of the Week

- Minnesota Whitecaps fans (awarded January 22, 2019)
