= List of Minnesota Golden Gophers women's ice hockey records and awards =

This is a list of records for the Minnesota Golden Gophers women's ice hockey team.

== NCAA career records ==
Source.

Record	Player	Points	Year
Points scored in a season	Natalie Darwitz	114	2005
Assists in a season	Natalie Darwitz	72	2005
Shorthanded goals scored in a season	Krissy Wendell	7	2005
Goalie winning percentage, season	Noora Räty	1.000 (38–0)	2013

== Career records ==
Source. For all per-game career records, the player's career must be complete to be included.

=== Points ===
Player	Points	Year
Hannah Brandt (115 G, 170 A)	286	2012–16
Abbey Murphy (143 G, 118 A)	261	2020–21, 2022–26
Amanda Kessel (108 G, 140 A)	248	2010–13, 2016
Natalie Darwitz (102 G, 144 A)	246	2002–05
Krissy Wendell (106 G, 131 A)	237	2002–05

=== Points Per Game ===
Player	Points	Year
Natalie Darwitz (99 GP)	2.48	2002–05
Krissy Wendell (101 GP)	2.35	2002–05
Jenny Schmidgall (32 GP)	2.22	1998–99
Amanda Kessel (126 GP)	1.97	2010–13, 2016
Monique Lamoureux (40 GP)	1.88	2008–09

=== Goals ===
Player	Goals	Year
Abbey Murphy	143	2020–21, 2022–26
Nadine Muzerall	139	1997–2001
Hannah Brandt	115	2012–16
Grace Zumwinkle	109	2017–21, 2022–23
Amanda Kessel	108	2010–13, 2016

=== Goals Per Game ===
Player	Goals Per Game	Year
Nadine Muzerall (129 GP)	1.08	1997–2001
Krissy Wendell (101 GP)	1.05	2002–05
Natalie Darwitz (99 GP)	1.03	2002–05
Jenny Schmidgall (32 GP)	1.03	1998–99
Monique Lamoureux (40 GP)	0.98	2008–09

=== Assists ===
Player	Assists	Year
Hannah Brandt	170	2012–16
Natalie Darwitz	144	2002–05
Amanda Kessel	140	2010–13, 2016
Krissy Wendell	131	2002–05
Taylor Heise	130	2018–23

=== Assists Per Game ===
Player	Assists Per Game	Year
Natalie Darwitz (99 GP)	1.45	2002–05
Krissy Wendell (101 GP)	1.30	2002–05
Jenny Schmidgall (32 GP)	1.19	1998–99
Amanda Kessel (126 GP)	1.11	2010–13, 2016
Hannah Brandt (158 GP)	1.08	2012–16

=== Points by a Defender ===
Player	Points	Year
Megan Bozek	146	2009–13
Winny Brodt	134	1998–2003
Rachel Ramsey	130	2011–15
Milica McMillen	120	2012–16
Anne Schleper	114	2008–12

=== Goals by a Defender ===
Player	Goals	Year
Megan Bozek	47	2009–13
Milica McMillen	44	2012–16
Winny Brodt	41	1998–2003
Courtney Kennedy	35	1998–2001
Rachel Ramsey	34	2011–15

=== Assists by a Defender ===
Player	Assists	Year
Megan Bozek	99	2009–13
Rachel Ramsey	96	2011–15
Winny Brodt	93	1998–2003
Anne Schleper	82	2008–12
Courtney Kennedy	77	1998–2001

=== Power-Play Goals ===
Player	PPG	Year
Nadine Muzerall	40	1997–2001
Abbey Murphy	37	2020–21, 2022–26
Krissy Wendell	33	2002–05
Dani Cameranesi	32	2013–17
Kelly Stephens	32	2001–05

=== Shorthanded Goals ===
Player	SHG	Year
Krissy Wendell	16	2002–05
Amanda Kessel	11	2010–13, 2016
Bobbi Ross	10	2004–08
Taylor Heise	9	2018–23
Ambria Thomas	8	1997–2001

=== Game-Winning Goals ===
Player	GWG	Year
Abbey Murphy	26	2020–21, 2022–26
Krissy Wendell	24	2002–05
Nadine Muzerall	24	1997–2001
Grace Zumwinkle	22	2017–21, 2022–23
Emily West	22	2007–12

=== Shots on Goal ===
Player	Shots	Year
Abbey Murphy	859	2020–21, 2022–26
Grace Zumwinkle	826	2017–21, 2022–23
Taylor Heise	800	2018–23
Nadine Muzerall	726	1997–2001
Hannah Brandt	661	2012–16

=== Shots Per Game ===
Player	Shots Per Game	Year
Natalie Darwitz (99 GP)	6.36	2002–05
Monique Lamoureux (40 GP)	5.75	2008–09
Nadine Muzerall (129 GP)	5.63	1997–2001
Jenny Schmidgall (32 GP)	5.44	1997–99
Krissy Wendell (101 GP)	5.05	2002–05

=== Games Played ===
Player	GP	Year
Audrey Wethington	175	2020–25
Taylor Heise	173	2018–23
Madeline Wethington	173	2019–24
Grace Zumwinkle	172	2017-21, 2022–23
Abbey Murphy	171	2020–21, 2022–26

=== Plus/Minus ===
Player	+/-	Year
Hannah Brandt	+236	2012–16
Rachel Ramsey	+172	2011–15
Kelly Stephens	+170	2001–05
Amanda Kessel	+161	2010–13, 2016
Ambria Thomas	+160	1997–2001

=== Penalties ===
Player	Penalties	Year
Abbey Murphy (124–290)	152	2020–21, 2022–26
Kelly Stephens (121-242)	121	2001–05
Melanie Gagnon (108-235)	108	2005–09
Courtney Kennedy (105-232)	105	1998–2001
Kelly Seeler (99-209)	99	2008–12

=== Penalty Minutes ===
Player	Minutes	Year
Abbey Murphy	357	2020–21, 2022–26
Kelly Stephens	242	2001–05
Melanie Gagnon	235	2005–09
Courtney Kennedy	232	1999–2001
Milica McMillen	212	2012–16

=== Goaltender Wins ===
Player	Wins	Year
Noora Räty (114–17–8)	114	2009–13
Amanda Leveille (98–9–5)	98	2012–16
Jody Horak (83–14–6)	83	2001–05
Erica Killewald (73–23–9)	73	1997–2001
Sidney Peters (53–17–6)	53	2013–18

=== Fewest Goaltender Losses ===
Minimum 5 Games Played.

Player	Losses	Year
Crystal Nicholas (25–0–0)	0	1998–2000
Stephanie Johnson (6–2–0)	2	2000–01
Sarah Harms (3–2–0)	2	1997–98
Brenda Reinen (36–3–5)	3	2001–05
Makalya Pahl (14–3–1)	3	2019–23
Lucy Morgan (15–3–0)	3	2023–24

=== Goaltender Shutouts ===
Player	Shutouts	Year
Noora Räty	43	2009–13
Amanda Leveille	32	2012–16
Erica Killewald	22	1997–2001
Jody Horak	20	2001–05
Sidney Peters	16	2013–18

=== Goaltender Saves ===
Player	Saves	Year
Noora Räty	3250	2009–13
Erica Killewald	2385	1997–2001
Amanda Leveille	2311	2012–16
Jody Horak	2213	2001–05
Skylar Vetter	1529	2021–Present

=== Goals against average ===
Minimum 300 minutes.

Player	GAA	Year
Amanda Leveille (130 GA, 6637:00)	1.18	2012–16
Crystal Nicholas (31 GA, 1486:00)	1.25	1998–2000
Noora Räty (185 GA, 8262:00)	1.34	2009–13
Brenda Reinen (73 GA, 2770:00)	1.58	2001–05
Jody Horak (164 GA, 6122:00)	1.61	2005–09

=== Save Percentage ===
Minimum 100 saves.

Player	SV%	Year
Amanda Leveille (130 GA, 2311 SV)	.947	2012–16
Noora Räty (185 GA, 3250 SV)	.946	2012–13
Brenda Reinen (73 GA, 1034 SV)	.934	2001–05
Jody Horak (164 GA, 2213 SV)	.931	2001–05
Lucy Morgan (31 GA, 421 SV)	.931	2023–24

== Individual seasonal records ==
Source.

=== Points ===
Player	Points	Year
Natalie Darwitz (42g, 72a)	114	2004–05
Krissy Wendell (43g, 61a)	104	2004–05
Amanda Kessel (46g, 55a)	101	2012–13
Hannah Brandt (33g, 49a)	82	2012–13
Amanda Kessel (32g, 48a)	80	2011–12

=== Points Per Game ===
Player	Points Per Game	Year
Natalie Darwitz	2.85	2004–05
Amanda Kessel	2.73	2012–13
Krissy Wendell	2.60	2004–05
Natalie Darwitz	2.46	2003–04
Nadine Muzerall	2.29	1997–98

=== Goals ===
Player	Goals	Year
Nadine Muzerall	49	1999–2000
Amanda Kessel	46	2012–13
Krissy Wendell	43	2004–05
Natalie Darwitz	42	2004–05
Abbey Murphy	40	2025–26

=== Goals Per Game ===
Player	Goals Per Game	Year
Abbey Murphy (31 games)	1.29	2025–26
Nadine Muzerall (38 games)	1.29	1999–2000
Amanda Kessel (37 games)	1.24	2012–13
Nadine Muzerall (28 games)	1.14	1997–98
Krissy Wendell (40 games)	1.08	2004–05

=== Assists ===
Player	Assists	Year
Natalie Darwitz	72	2004–05
Krissy Wendell	61	2004–05
Amanda Kessel	55	2012–13
Hannah Brandt	49	2012–13
Amanda Kessel	48	2011–12

=== Assists Per Game ===
Player	Assists Per Game	Year
Natalie Darwitz (40 games)	1.80	2004–05
Krissy Wendell (40 games)	1.52	2004–05
Amanda Kessel (37 games)	1.49	2012–13
Natalie Darwitz (26 games)	1.42	2003–04
Winny Brodt (28 games)	1.32	1999–2000

=== Points by a Defender ===
Player	Points	Year
Megan Bozek	57	2012–13
Winny Brodt	50	1999–2000
Lyndsay Wall	48	2004–05
Ronda Curtin	48	2001–02
Winny Brodt	45	1998–99

=== Goals by a Defender ===
Player	Goals	Year
Megan Bozek	20	2012–13
Courtney Kennedy	16	1998–99
Megan Bozek	15	2011–12
Brittny Ralph	15	1997–98
Lyndsay Wall	14	2004–05
Winny Brodt	14	2002–03
Winny Brodt	14	1998–99

=== Assists by a Defender ===
Player	Assists	Year
Megan Bozek	37	2012–13
Winny Brodt	37	1999–2000
Ronda Curtin	35	2001–02
Lyndsay Wall	34	2004–05
Rachel Ramsey	31	2013–14
Courtney Kennedy	31	2000–01
Winny Brodt	31	1998–99

=== Points by a Rookie ===
Player	Points	Year
Hannah Brandt	82	2012–13
Monique Lamoureux	75	2008–09
Jenny Schmidgall	71	1998–99
Natalie Darwitz	68	2002–03
Jocelyne Lamoureux	65	2008–09

=== Goals by a Rookie ===
Player	Goals	Year
Monique Lamoureux	39	2008–09
Hannah Brandt	33	2012–13
Natalie Darwitz	33	2002–03
Jenny Schmidgall	33	1998–99
Nadine Muzerall	32	1997–98

=== Assists by a Rookie ===
Player	Assists	Year
Hannah Brandt	49	2012–13
Sarah Potomak	39	2015–16
Jenny Schmidgall	38	1998–99
Jocelyne Lamoureux	37	2008–09
Monique Lamoureux	36	2008–09

=== Power-Play Goals ===
Player	PPG	Year
Kelly Stephens	16	2004–05
Nadine Muzerall	16	1999–2000
Krissy Wendell	14	2004–05
Abbey Murphy	13	2023–24
Dani Cameranesi	13	2015–16

=== Game-Winning Goals ===
Player	GWG	Year
Emily West	10	2009–10
Grace Zumwinkle	9	2022–23
Nadine Muzerall	9	1999–2000
Krissy Wendell	9	2003–04
Natalie Darwitz	9	2004–05
Krissy Wendell	9	2004–05

=== Shorthanded Goals ===
Player	SHG	Year
Krissy Wendell	7	2004–05
Krissy Wendell	6	2003–04
Taylor Heise	5	2021–22
Amanda Kessel	5	2012–13
Natalie Darwitz	5	2004–05
Ambria Thomas	5	1999–2000
Monique Lamoureux	5	2008–09

=== Shots on Goal ===
Player	Shots	Year
Natalie Darwitz	270	2004–05
Abbey Murphy	242	2024–25
Taylor Heise	235	2021–22
Monique Lamoureux	230	2008–09
Abbey Murphy	227	2025–26
Emily West	227	2009–10

=== Shots Per Game ===
Player	Shots	Year
Abbey Murphy (31 games)	7.32	2025–26
Natalie Darwitz (40 games)	6.75	2004–05
Natalie Darwitz (26 games)	6.19	2003–04
Natalie Darwitz (33 games)	6.03	2002–03
Taylor Heise (39 games)	6.02	2021–22

=== Plus/Minus ===
Player	+/-	Year
Hannah Brandt	+77	2012–13
Krissy Wendell	+74	2004–05
Natalie Darwitz	+72	2004–05
Amanda Kessel	+71	2012–13
Hannah Brandt	+69	2014–15

=== Penalties ===
Player	Penalties	Year
Courtney Kennedy (50-114)	50	1999–2000
Jocelyne Lamoureux (46-92)	46	2008–09
Abbey Murphy	45	2023–24
Abbey Murphy	38	2024–25
Danielle Ashley (37-74)	37	2003–04

=== Penalty Minutes ===
Player	Minutes	Year
Abbey Murphy (43–114)	118	2023–24
Courtney Kennedy (50-114)	114	1999–2000
Jocelyne Lamoureux (46-92)	92	2008–09
Monique Lamoureux (32-86)	86	2008–09

=== Goaltender Wins ===
Player	Wins	Year
Amanda Leveille (38–2–1)	38	2013–14
Noora Räty (38–0–0)	38	2012–13
Noora Räty (33–5–2)	33	2011–12
Amanda Leveille (29–4–1)	29	2015–16
Amanda Leveille (28–3–3)	28	2014–15

=== Saves ===
Player	Saves	Year
Noora Räty	957	2010–11
Noora Räty	854	2011–12
Amanda Leveille	850	2013–14
Hannah Clark	814	2024–25
Skylar Vetter	811	2022–23

=== Goals against average ===
Minimum 500 minutes.

Player	GAA	Year
Crystal Nicholas (9 GA, 636:11)	0.85	1998–99
Noora Räty (36 GA, 2240:11)	0.96	2012–13
Brenda Reinen (12 GA, 719:37)	1.00	2004–05
Kim Hanlon (19 GA, 1017:47)	1.12	2005–06
Amanda Leveille (39 GA, 1984:18)	1.18	2014–15

=== Save Percentage ===
Minimum 100 saves.

Player	SV%	Year
Noora Räty (36 GA, 776 Saves)	.956	2012–13
Noora Räty (36 GA, 663 Saves)	.948	2009–10
Erica Killewald (32 GA, 576 Saves)	.947	1998–99
Jody Horak (26 GA, 464 Saves)	.947	2001–02
Amanda Leveille (39 GA, 689 Saves)	.946	2014–15
Brenda Reinen (12 GA, 212 Saves)	.946	2004–05

=== Shutouts ===
Player	Shutouts	Year
Noora Räty	17	2012–13
Amanda Leveille	13	2013–14
Amanda Leveille	10	2015–16
Noora Räty	10	2011–12
Noora Räty	9	2010–11

== Awards and honors ==
=== All-Americans ===
Source.

Year	Player	Team
2000–01	Courtney Kennedy	1st team
2001–02	Ronda Curtin	1st team
2002–03	Ronda Curtin	1st team
2002–03	Natalie Darwitz	1st team
2002–03	Krissy Wendell	2nd team
2003–04	Krissy Wendell	1st team
2003–04	Natalie Darwitz	2nd team
2004–05	Natalie Darwitz	1st team
2004–05	Lyndsay Wall	1st team
2004–05	Krissy Wendell	1st team
2004–05	Jody Horak	2nd team
2007–08	Gigi Marvin	2nd team
2008–09	Melanie Gagnon	2nd team
2008–09	Monique Lamoureux	2nd team
2009–10	Noora Räty	1st team
2009–10	Anne Schleper	1st team
2010–11	Noora Räty	2nd team
2011–12	Megan Bozek	1st team
2011–12	Amanda Kessel	2nd team
2012–13	Megan Bozek	1st team
2012–13	Amanda Kessel	1st team
2012–13	Noora Räty	1st team
2013–14	Hannah Brandt	1st team
2013–14	Rachel Ramsey	1st team
2013–14	Milica McMillen	2nd team
2014–15	Hannah Brandt	1st team
2014–15	Rachel Ramsey	1st team
2014–15	Dani Cameranesi	2nd team
2014–15	Lee Stecklein	2nd team
2015–16	Hannah Brandt	1st team
2015–16	Lee Stecklein	2nd team
2015–16	Dani Cameranesi	2nd team
2016–17	Lee Stecklein	1st team
2016–17	Kelly Pannek	1st team
2017–18	Sydney Baldwin	1st team
2020–21	Grace Zumwinkle	2nd team
2021–22	Taylor Heise	1st team
2022–23	Taylor Heise	1st team
2022–23	Grace Zumwinkle	2nd team
2024–25	Abbey Murphy	2nd team
2025–26	Abbey Murphy	1st team
2025–26	Nelli Laitinen	2nd team
2025–26	Sydney Morrow	2nd team

=== National Rookie of the Year ===
Source.

Year	Player
2013–14	Dani Cameranesi
2015–16	Sarah Potomak
2021–22	Peyton Hemp

=== All-WCHA teams ===
Source.

Year	Player	Team
1999–2000	Winny Brodt-Brown	1st team
1999–2000	Nadine Muzerall	1st team
1999–2000	Courtney Kennedy	2nd team
1999–2000	Crystal Nicholas	2nd team
1999–2000	Laura Slominski	2nd team
1999–2000	Ambria Thomas	2nd team
2000–01	Courtney Kennedy	1st team
2000–01	Erica Killewald	1st team
2000–01	Ambria Thomas	2nd team
2000–01	LaToya Clarke	2nd team
2001–02	Ronda Curtin	1st team
2001–02	Jody Horak	1st team
2001–02	Kelly Stephens	2nd team
2002–03	Ronda Curtin	1st team
2002–03	Natalie Darwitz	1st team
2002–03	Jody Horak	1st team
2002–03	Krissy Wendell	2nd team
2003–04	Natalie Darwitz	1st team
2003–04	Krissy Wendell	1st team
2004–05	Natalie Darwitz	1st team
2004–05	Lyndsay Wall	1st team
2004–05	Krissy Wendell	1st team
2004–05	Kelly Stephens	2nd team
2004–05	Jody Horak	2nd team
2005–06	Erica McKenzie	1st team
2005–06	Gigi Marvin	3rd team
2006–07	Gigi Marvin	1st team
2006–07	Bobbi Ross	3rd team
2006–07	Melanie Gagnon	3rd team
2007–08	Gigi Marvin	1st team
2007–08	Rachael Drazan	1st team
2007–08	Erica McKenzie	2nd team
2007–08	Anya Miller	2nd team
2007–08	Bobbi Ross	3rd team
2007–08	Melanie Gagnon	3rd team
2008–09	Melanie Gagnon	1st team
2008–09	Jocelyne Lamoureux	1st team
2008–09	Monique Lamoureux	1st team
2008–09	Rachel Drazan	2nd team
2008–09	Gigi Marvin	2nd team
2008–09	Anne Schleper	2nd team
2009–10	Noora Räty	1st team
2009–10	Anne Schleper	1st team
2009–10	Emily West	1st team
2009–10	Megan Bozek	2nd team
2010–11	Noora Räty	1st team
2010–11	Anne Schleper	1st team
2010–11	Megan Bozek	3rd team
2010–11	Amanda Kessel	3rd team
2011–12	Megan Bozek	1st team
2011–12	Anne Schleper	1st team
2011–12	Amanda Kessel	2nd team
2011–12	Jen Schoullis	2nd team
2011–12	Noora Räty	3rd team
2012–13	Megan Bozek	1st team
2012–13	Hannah Brandt	1st team
2012–13	Amanda Kessel	1st team
2012–13	Noora Räty	1st team
2012–13	Mira Jalosuo	3rd team
2012–13	Kelly Terry	3rd team
2012–13	Rachel Ramsey	3rd team
2013–14	Hannah Brandt	1st team
2013–14	Milica McMillen	1st team
2013–14	Rachel Ramsey	1st team
2013–14	Kelly Terry	1st team
2013–14	Rachael Bona	2nd team
2013–14	Sarah Davis	2nd team
2013–14	Amanda Leveille	2nd team
2014–15	Hannah Brandt	1st team
2014–15	Dani Cameranesi	1st team
2014–15	Rachel Ramsey	1st team
2014–15	Lee Stecklein	1st team
2014–15	Milica McMillen	2nd team
2014–15	Rachael Bona	3rd team
2015–16	Hannah Brandt	1st team
2015–16	Dani Cameranesi	1st team
2015–16	Lee Stecklein	1st team
2015–16	Milica McMillen	2nd team
2015–16	Sarah Potomak	3rd team
2016–17	Kelly Pannek	1st team
2016–17	Lee Stecklein	1st team
2016–17	Sarah Potomak	2nd team
2016–17	Dani Cameranesi	3rd team
2016–17	Megan Wolfe	3rd team
2017–18	Sydney Baldwin	1st team
2017–18	Grace Zumwinkle	1st team
2017–18	Caitlin Reilly	2nd team
2018–19	Grace Zumwinkle	1st team
2018–19	Nicole Schammel	2nd team
2018–19	Emily Brown	2nd team
2018–19	Patti Marshall	3rd team
2018–19	Kelly Pannek	3rd team
2019–20	Sydney Scobee	1st team
2019–20	Emily Brown	2nd team
2019–20	Grace Zumwinkle	2nd team
2019–20	Taylor Heise	3rd team
2019–20	Sarah Potomak	3rd team
2020–21	Grace Zumwinkle	1st team
2020–21	Emily Brown	2nd team
2020–21	Madeline Wethington	3rd team
2021–22	Taylor Heise	1st team
2021–22	Abigail Boreen	2nd team
2021–22	Emily Brown	3rd team
2021–22	Madeline Wethington	3rd team
2022–23	Taylor Heise	1st team
2022–23	Grace Zumwinkle	1st team
2022–23	Abigail Boreen	3rd team
2022–23	Abbey Murphy	3rd team
2022–23	Skylar Vetter	3rd team
2023–24	Nelli Laitinen	2nd team
2023–24	Abbey Murphy	2nd team
2023–24	Madeline Wethington	3rd team
2024–25	Abbey Murphy	2nd team
2024–25	Sydney Morrow	2nd team
2024–25	Chloe Primerano	3rd team
2025–26	Abbey Murphy	1st team
2025–26	Nelli Laitinen	2nd team
2025–26	Sydney Morrow	2nd team

=== WCHA Most Valuable Player / Player of the Year ===
Source.

Year	Player
2000–01	Courtney Kennedy
2001–02	Ronda Curtin
2003–04	Krissy Wendell
2004–05	Krissy Wendell
2012–13	Amanda Kessel
2013–14	Hannah Brandt
2014–15	Hannah Brandt
2017–18	Sydney Baldwin
2021–22	Taylor Heise

=== WCHA Student-Athlete of the Year ===
Source.

Year	Player
1999–2000	Shannon Kennedy
2008–09	Gigi Marvin
2012–13	Kelly Terry
2019–20	Alex Woken

=== WCHA Offensive Player of the Year ===
Source.

Year	Player
2021–22	Taylor Heise
2022–23	Taylor Heise
2025–26	Abbey Murphy

=== WCHA Defensive Player of the Year ===
Source.

Year	Player
1999–2000	Winny Brodt
2000–01	Courtney Kennedy
2001–02	Ronda Curtin
2002–03	Ronda Curtin
2008–09	Melanie Gagnon
2009–10	Anne Schleper
2012–13	Megan Bozek
2013–14	Rachel Ramsey
2014–15	Rachel Ramsey
2017–18	Sydney Baldwin

=== WCHA Goaltender of the Year ===
Source.

Year	Player
2019–20	Sydney Scobee

=== WCHA Rookie of the Year ===
Source.

Year	Player
2002–03	Natalie Darwitz
2004–05	Bobbi Ross
2005–06	Gigi Marvin
2008–09	Monique Lamoureux
2010–11	Amanda Kessel
2012–13	Hannah Brandt
2013–14	Dani Cameranesi
2015–16	Sarah Potomak
2019–20	Madeline Wethington
2021–22	Peyton Hemp

=== WCHA Coach of the Year ===
Source.

Year	Coach
2000–01	Laura Halldorson
2001–02	Laura Halldorson
2004–05	Laura Halldorson
2007–08	Brad Frost
2008–09	Brad Frost
2012–13	Brad Frost
2013–14	Brad Frost

=== WCHA Scoring Champion ===
Source.

Year	Coach
2001–02	Ronda Curtin
2004–05	Natalie Darwitz
2005–06	Erica McKenzie
2008–09	Monique Lamoureux
2012–13	Amanda Kessel
2013–14	Hannah Brandt
2014–15	Hannah Brandt
2015–16	Dani Cameranesi
2016–17	Kelley Pannek
2017–18	Grace Zumwinkle
2018–19	Nicole Schammel
2021–22	Taylor Heise
2022–23	Taylor Heise

=== WCHA All-Rookie Team ===
Source.

Year	Player
2002–03	Natalie Darwitz
2002–03	Krissy Wendell
2004–05	Bobbi Ross
2005–06	Gigi Marvin
2005–06	Melanie Gagnon
2005–06	Kim Hanlon
2006–07	Michelle Maunu
2007–08	Jenny Lura
2008–09	Jocelyne Lamoureux
2008–09	Monique Lamoureux
2008–09	Anne Schleper
2009–10	Noora Räty
2009–10	Megan Bozek
2010–11	Baylee Gillanders
2010–11	Amanda Kessel
2010–11	Kelly Terry
2011–12	Rachel Ramsey
2012–13	Hannah Brandt
2012–13	Milica McMillen
2012–13	Maryanne Menefee
2013–14	Dani Cameranesi
2014–15	Sydney Baldwin
2014–15	Kelly Pannek
2015–16	Sarah Potomak
2017–18	Olivia Knowles
2017–18	Grace Zumwinkle
2018–19	Taylor Heise
2019–20	Madeline Wethington
2020–21	Josey Dunne
2020–21	Abbey Murphy
2021–22	Peyton Hemp
2021–22	Ella Huber
2021–22	Emily Zumwinkle
2022–23	Nelli Laitinen
2024–25	Chloe Primerano
2024–25	Gracie Graham
2025–26	Bella Fanale

=== Patty Kazmaier Memorial Award finalists ===
As of November 24, 2024, the following players have been named as Finalists for the Patty Kazmaier Memorial Award, presented annually to the top player in NCAA Division I women's ice hockey.

Year	Winner	Top Three	Top Ten
1997–98			Nadine Muzerall (Note: In 1998, 11 finalists were named instead of 10)
1999–2000			Winny Brodt
2000–01		Courtney Kennedy	Nadine Muzerall
2001–02		Ronda Curtin	Laura Slominski
2002–03			Natalie Darwitz, Krissy Wendell
2003–04			Natalie Darwitz, Krissy Wendell
2004–05	Krissy Wendell	Natalie Darwitz	
2007–08			Gigi Marvin
2008–09			Gigi Marvin, Monique Lamoureux
2009–10		Noora Räty	
2010–11			Noora Räty
2011–12			Amanda Kessel
2012–13	Amanda Kessel	Megan Bozek, Noora Räty	Hannah Brandt
2013–14		Hannah Brandt	Rachael Bona
2014–15		Hannah Brandt	Dani Cameranesi, Rachel Ramsey
2015–16			Hannah Brandt, Dani Cameranesi
2016–17			Kelly Pannek, Sarah Potomak
2017–18			Sydney Baldwin
2018–19			Nicole Schammel
2020–21		Grace Zumwinkle	
2021–22	Taylor Heise		
2022–23			Taylor Heise, Grace Zumwinkle
2023–24			Abbey Murphy
2024–25			Abbey Murphy
2025–26		Abbey Murphy	
