= Brodt =

Brodt is a surname. Notable people with the surname include:

- Chelsey Brodt-Rosenthal (born 1983), American ice hockey player
- Nelson Brodt (born 1943), Chilean actor, director, dramatist, and teacher
- Sydney Brodt (born 1998), American ice hockey player
- Winny Brodt-Brown (born 1978), American ice hockey player
