= Allie Morse =

American ice hockey player

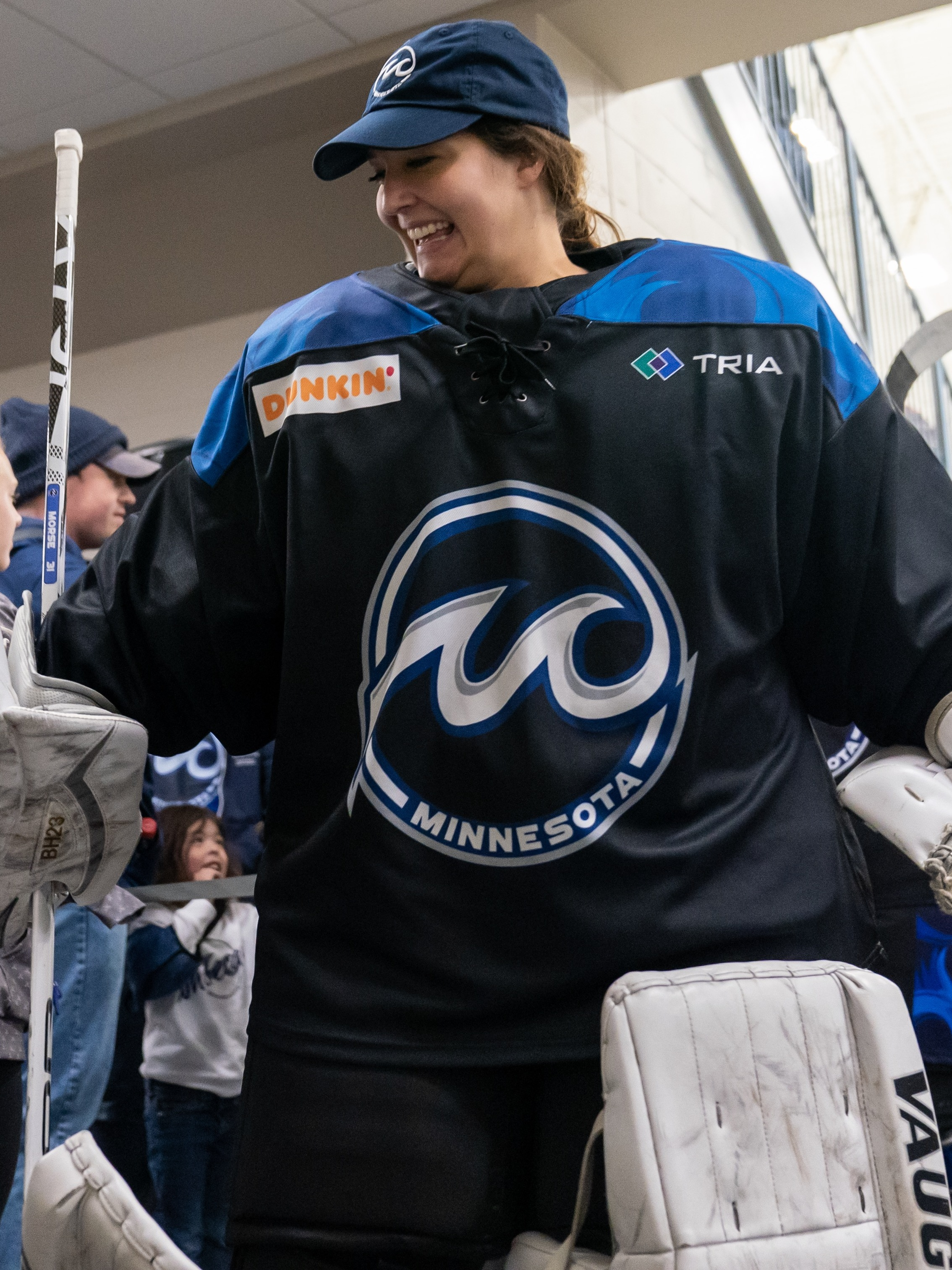
- Morse in 2019
- Born: March 22, 1994 (age 31); Cottage Grove, Minnesota, United States
- Height: 5 ft 6 in (168 cm)
- Position: Goaltender
- Caught: Left
- Played for: Minnesota Whitecaps; Providence Friars
- Playing career: 2012–2022

Allie Morse (born March 22, 1994) is a retired American ice hockey goaltender who most recently played for the Minnesota Whitecaps of the Premier Hockey Federation (PHF) during the 2021–22 season.

== Playing career ==
During her teenage years, Morse attended Park High School in Minnesota, serving as the starting goaltender for the school's girls' hockey team. She was named a semifinalist for the Let's Play Hockey Senior Goalie of the Year Award in 2012.

From 2012 to 2016, she attended Providence College, where she played for the Friars women's ice hockey programme. She was named Hockey East Defensive Player of the Week in November 2014. As a junior she started in 29 games as and finished her career with an .886 save percentage.

In 2017, she joined the then-independent Minnesota Whitecaps ahead of the team's exhibition tour in Sweden against Swedish Women's Hockey League (SDHL) clubs. She would return to the Whitecaps for the 2019–20 NWHL season to serve as Amanda Leveille's backup.

== Personal life ==
Morse has been noted for her social media collaborations with fellow Whitecaps' goalie Amanda Leveille. Her father, Steve Morse, has served as a head coach for the Park High School hockey team.
