= Minnesota Ms. Hockey Award =

Minnesota Hockey Award

The Ms. Hockey Award is an award given to the best female senior high school hockey player in the state of Minnesota. The award is sponsored by the Let's Play Hockey newspaper, the Minnesota Wild, and Shakopee Chevrolet. The 2023 award winner was Ella Boerger, a forward from Andover High School.

== Criteria ==
The following are all criteria for the award:

- Academic record
- Community service
- Coachability
- On-ice performance.

=== Selection process ===
The process of selecting the winner starts with the selection of the top 10 candidates in the state. This is reduced to five finalists, and then the panel selects a winner.

The panel responsible for selecting the winner consist of the following:

- High school coaches
- Division I and III college coaches from Minnesota and Wisconsin

== Winners ==
The following table lists the winners of the Minnesota Ms. Hockey award.

Year	Player	Position	School	Ref.
1996	Winny Brodt	D	Roseville	
1997	Annamarie Holmes	D	Apple Valley	
1998	Laura Slominski	F	Burnsville	
1999	Ronda Curtin	D	Roseville	
2000	Krissy Wendell	F	Park Center	
2001	Renee Curtin	F	Roseville	
2002	Ashley Albrecht	D	South St. Paul	
2003	Andrea Nichols	F	Hibbing-Chisholm	
2004	Erica McKenzie	F	Hastings	
2005	Gigi Marvin	F	Warroad	
2006	Allie Thunstrom	F	North St. Paul	
2007	Katharine Chute	F	Blake	
2008	Sarah Erickson	F	Bemidji	
2009	Becky Kortum	F	Hopkins	
2010	Bethany Brausen	F	Roseville Area	
2011	Karley Sylvester	F	Warroad	
2012	Hannah Brandt	F	Hill-Murray	
2013	Dani Cameranesi	F	Blake	
2014	Sydney Baldwin	D	Minnetonka	
2015	Taylor Williamson	F	Edina	
2016	Presley Norby	F	Minnetonka	
2017	Grace Zumwinkle	F	Breck School	
2018	Taylor Heise	F	Red Wing	
2019	Madeline Wethington	D	Blake	
2020	Olivia Mobley	F	Breck School	
2021	Peyton Hemp	F	Andover	
2022	Vivian Jungels	D	Edina	
2023	Ella Boerger	F	Andover	
2024	Ayla Puppe	F	Northfield	
2025	Mercury Bischoff	F	Grand Rapids/Greenway	
2026	Maddy Kimbrel	F	Holy Family	

== Jori Jones Award ==
The following table lists the winners of the Jori Jones Award, which is presented to the Let's Play Hockey Senior Goalie of the Year.

Year	Player	School	Ref.
1999	Katie Beauduy	Blaine	
2000	Shari Vogt	River Lakes	
2001	Jody Horak	Blaine	
2002	Amber Hasbargen	Warroad	
2003	Robin Doepke	Chaska	
2004	Emily Brookshaw	Hill-Murray	
2005	Johanna Ellison	Cloquet-Esko-Carlton	
2006	Alannah McCready	Centennial	
2007	Ashley Nixon	Blaine	
2008	Alyssa Grogan	Eagan	
2009	Laura Bellamy	Duluth	
2010	Kallie Billadeau	Hopkins	
2011	Julie Friend	Minnetonka	
2012	Erika Allen	Roseville	
2013	Sydney Rossman	Minnetonka	
2014	Erin O'Neil	Hopkins	
2015	Frances Marshall	Thief River Falls	
2016	Jenna Brenneman	Breck	
2017	Breanna Blesi	Maple Grove	
2018	Alexa Dobchuk	Eden Prairie	
2019	Calla Frank	White Bear Lake	
2020	Anna LaRose	North Wright County	
2021	Brynn Dulac	Minnetonka	
2022	Maggie Malecha	Northfield	
2023	Uma Corniea	Edina	
2024	Grace Zhan	Hill-Murray	
2025	Layla Hemp	Minnetonka	

== Olympians ==
The following Ms. Hockey winners went to represent USA Hockey in the Winter Olympic Games.

Player	Event	Result
Krissy Wendell	Ice hockey at the 2002 Winter Olympics	Silver
Krissy Wendell	Ice hockey at the 2006 Winter Olympics	Bronze
Gigi Marvin	Ice hockey at the 2010 Winter Olympics	Silver
Gigi Marvin	Ice hockey at the 2014 Winter Olympics	Silver
Gigi Marvin	Ice hockey at the 2018 Winter Olympics	Gold
Dani Cameranesi	Ice hockey at the 2018 Winter Olympics	Gold
Dani Cameranesi	Ice hockey at the 2022 Winter Olympics	Silver
Hannah Brandt	Ice hockey at the 2018 Winter Olympics	Gold
Hannah Brandt	Ice hockey at the 2022 Winter Olympics	Silver
Grace Zumwinkle	Ice hockey at the 2022 Winter Olympics	Silver
Grace Zumwinkle	Ice hockey at the 2026 Winter Olympics	Gold
Taylor Heise	Ice hockey at the 2026 Winter Olympics	Gold
