= Richfield Ice Arena =

Ice arena in Richfield, Minnesota

- Interactive map of Richfield Ice Arena
- Location: 636 East 66th Street; Richfield, MN 55423
- Coordinates: 44.8853909°N 93.2651331°W
- Owner: The City of Richfield
- Operator: The City of Richfield
- Capacity: 1,800
- Surface: Ice

Construction
- Opened: 1971
- Architects: Wold Associates, Inc.
- Structural engineers: Bakke & Kopp, Inc.
- Services engineers: Jacus & Amble, Inc.
- General contractors: Sheehy Construction, Inc.

Tenant
- Minnesota Whitecaps (PHF) (2022–2023)

Richfield Ice Arena is an ice arena located in the city of Richfield, Minnesota. The Arena offers skating lessons, skate rental, open skating and open hockey. The Arena is the home rink for the Richfield High School and the Academy of Holy Angels High School. The Richfield Hockey Association coordinates the youth hockey program. For the 2022–23 season, the arena was home to the Minnesota Whitecaps of the Premier Hockey Federation.

== History ==
The original main Rink #1 built back in 1971 has seating for 1,400 spectators, and room for another 500 fans that can watch while standing. Adjacent to Rink #1 is the newer Rink #2 which was added in 1999 to the arena and serves as more of a practice sheet of ice. Rink 2 has only nominal seating for only 200 fans in steel bleachers.

== Improvements ==
The City of Richfield plans to invest $2 million in the building, adding a locker room for the Whitecaps, expanding the lobby, adding classrooms and a training facility.
