= Sara Bustad =

American ice hockey player

- Born: November 20, 1994 (age 31) Stillwater, Minnesota, US
- Height: 5 ft 7 in (170 cm)
- Position: Defense
- Shoots: Right
- PHF team: Minnesota Whitecaps
- Played for: Buffalo Beauts; Minnesota State Mavericks
- Playing career: 2013–present

Sara Bustad (born November 20, 1994) is an American ice hockey player, currently playing with the Minnesota Whitecaps of the Premier Hockey Federation (PHF). A defensive specialist known for her shot-blocking abilities and scrappy play, she has played as both a forward and a defenseman in her career.

She is the head coach of the women's ice hockey team at Woodbury High School in Woodbury, Minnesota.

== Career ==
Growing up in her home town of Stillwater, Minnesota, she played hockey on boys' teams until high school, where she played for the girls' team at Stillwater Area High School, scoring almost a point per game from 2010 to 2013.

From 2013 to 2018, she played for Minnesota State University, posting 16 points across 138 NCAA games. She was redshirted in her first season with the university. She would return to play for the 2014–15 season, scoring her first career NCAA goal on January 16, 2015. During her first two seasons with the university, she played a defender, but switched to playing forward for the rest of her collegiate career.

After graduating, she signed her first professional contract with the NWHL's Buffalo Beauts. She scored 11 points in 23 games in her rookie NWHL season. She was suspended for a game late in the season after receiving a match penalty for kicking a player in a skirmish, having also been ejected from the game for fighting Madison Packer of the Metropolitan Riveters.

Ahead of the 2020–21 NWHL season, she returned to her native state to sign with the Minnesota Whitecaps.

== International career ==
Bustad attended the USA Hockey National Development Camp twice, once as a U16 player and once as U17.

== Personal life ==
Bustad attended Stillwater Area High School, where she was a member of the school choir. She has previously worked as a Community Hockey Coordinator for the NHL's Tampa Bay Lightning.
