= Taylor Turnquist =

American ice hockey player (born 1997)

- Born: August 14, 1997 (age 28) Blaine, Minnesota, U.S.
- Height: 5 ft 5 in (165 cm)
- Position: Defenseman
- Shoots: Right
- NWHL team Former teams: Minnesota Whitecaps: Boston Pride; Clarkson Golden Knights (NCAA)
- National team: United States
- Playing career: 2016–present

Taylor Turnquist (born August 14, 1997) is an American ice hockey player who played for the now defunct Minnesota Whitecaps in the Premier Hockey Federation.

== Career ==
Turnquist attended Spring Lake Park High School, where she mostly played as a forward. Turnquist won national titles as a regular defender for the Clarkson University Golden Knights in 2017 and 2018. In 158 NCAA games over 4 years at Clarkson, Turnquist scored 8 goals and 40 points. As a senior she served as an assistant captain. She was versatile and willing enough to play some games at forward due to team injuries in her senior season.

Turnquist was drafted in the 4th round of the 2020 NWHL Draft and signed a one-year deal with the Boston Pride on July 22, 2020.

== Personal life ==
Turnquist is the daughter of Steve and Andrea, and two brothers, Luke and Nick. She grew up as a fan of the Minnesota Wild and Mikko Koivu. She is engaged to Minnesota Wild forward Nico Sturm, whom she met when both were freshmen at Clarkson.

Turnquist majored in business at Clarkson University.

== Career stats ==
			Regular Season					Playoffs
Season	Team	League	GP	G	A	Pts	PIM	GP	G	A	Pts	PIM
2016–17	Clarkson University	NCAA	41	1	6	7	6	-	-	-	-	-
2017-18	Clarkson University	NCAA	40	2	5	7	8	-	-	-	-	-
2018-19	Clarkson University	NCAA	40	2	12	14	26	-	-	-	-	-
2019–20	Clarkson University	NCAA	37	3	9	12	20	-	-	-	-	-
2020-21	Boston Pride	NWHL
NWHL totals

== Honours ==
- 2019-20 Clarkson Coaches Award
- 2019-20 Named assistant captain for the Clarkson Golden Knights
- 2016-20 Named to ECAC Hockey All-Academic team for all four years at Clarkson
