= Allie Thunstrom =

American ice hockey player

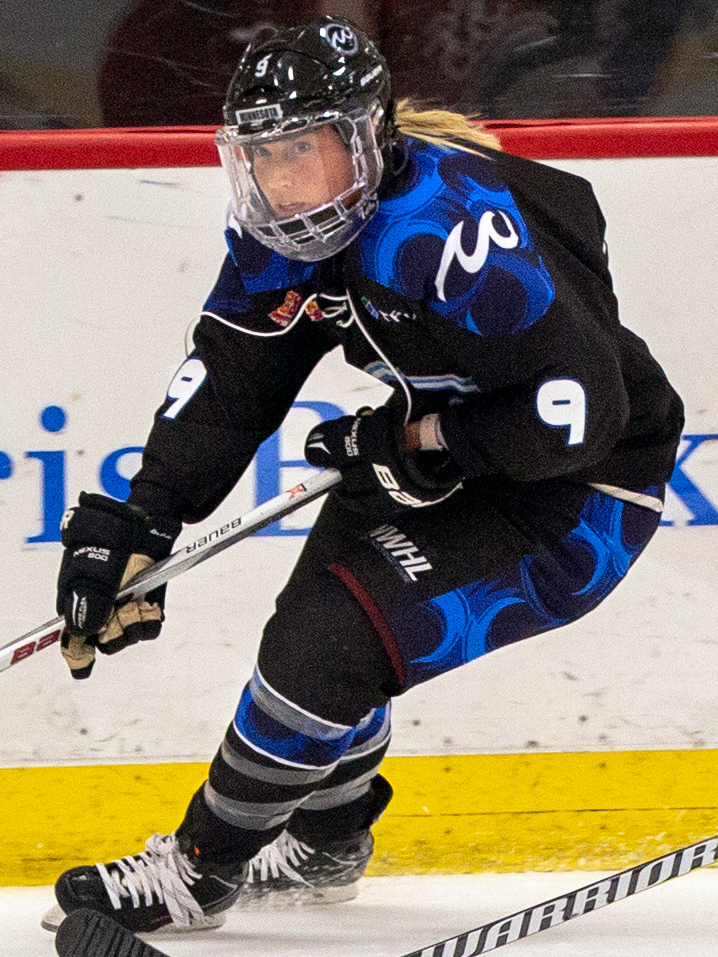
- Thunstrom with the Minnesota Whitecaps in 2018
- Born: April 20, 1988 (age 38) Maplewood, Minnesota, U.S.
- Height: 5 ft 5 in (165 cm)
- Weight: 145 lb (66 kg; 10 st 5 lb)
- Position: Forward
- PHF team Former teams: Boston Pride; Minnesota Whitecaps; Boston College
- National team: United States
- Playing career: 2006–present

Allie Thunstrom
Medal record

Women's ice hockey

Representing United States

Women's 4 Nations Cup
Gold medal – first place	2010 Silver	Tournament

Allison Thunstrom (born April 20, 1988) is an American ice hockey forward who played for the Boston Pride in the now defunct Premier Hockey Federation (PHF). She currently holds the PHF record for goals scored in a single season. She has also played for the United States national team.

== Playing career ==
=== High school ===
At North St. Paul High School, she was the recipient of the 2006 Minnesota Ms. Hockey Award. She was named to the Associated Press All-State first-team in 2006. In addition, she was an All-Conference and All-State in soccer and softball in the state of Minnesota as well.

=== NCAA ===
Thunstrom never missed a game while competing for Boston College. She appeared in all 141 games in her four years. In her senior season (2009–10), she recorded 22 goals and seven assists. Thunstrom led the Eagles in goals and points and finished the season with the most goals scored in Hockey East.

=== NWHL ===
On August 1, 2018, Thunstrom signed a contract with the Whitecaps, which also signified her first player contract with the NWHL. She was selected to compete in the 4th NWHL All-Star Game for Team Stecklein in 2019 and the 5th NWHL All-Star Game for Team Dempsey in 2020. She won the fastest skater event at the 2020 skills challenge.

In the 2019–20 season, Thunstrom broke out with 36 points in 24 games, tied for second in the league with Whitecaps teammate Jonna Curtis and Boston Pride forward McKenna Brand. She became the first player in NWHL history to score 20 goals in a season. The Whitecaps made it to the Isobel Cup finals for the second year in a row, after Thunstrom scored the game-winning overtime goal against the Metropolitan Riveters in the semi-finals. The championship was ultimately cancelled due to the 2019-20 coronavirus pandemic.

In May 2025, Thunstrom, 37, declared for the 2025 PWHL draft. She did not play professional hockey in 2024-25.

=== International ===
She won a silver medal at the 2010 Four Nations Cup contest in St. John's, Newfoundland.

== Personal life ==
In 2012, Thunstrom switched from hockey to speedskating in order to pursue her Olympic dreams. She competed in the 2014 and 2018 Olympic Trials, but missed out on the team. She also plays bandy.

She has listed former NHL player Pavel Bure as one of her favourite childhood players.

== Career statistics ==
			Regular season					Playoffs
Season	Team	League	GP	G	A	Pts	PIM	GP	G	A	Pts	PIM
2006-07	Boston College	NCAA	35	30	17	47	16	-	-	-	-	-
2007-08	Boston College	NCAA	34	15	5	20	12	-	-	-	-	-
2008-09	Boston College	NCAA	36	19	23	42	22	-	-	-	-	-
2009-10	Boston College	NCAA	35	22	7	29	16	-	-	-	-	-
2018-19	Minnesota Whitecaps	NWHL	16	5	4	9	4	2	0	1	1	0
2019-20	Minnesota Whitecaps	NWHL	24	24	12	36	6	1	1	0	1	0
NWHL totals			40	29	16	45	10	3	1	1	2	0

== Awards and honors ==
- 2006 Minnesota Ms. Hockey Award
- 2010 WHEA Second-Team All-Star
- 2010 Frozen Four Skills Competition participant
- 2019 Isobel Cup Champion
- 2020 NWHL Most Valuable Player Award (shared with Jillian Dempsey)
- 2020 NWHL Foundation Award
