= Audra Morrison =

American ice hockey forward

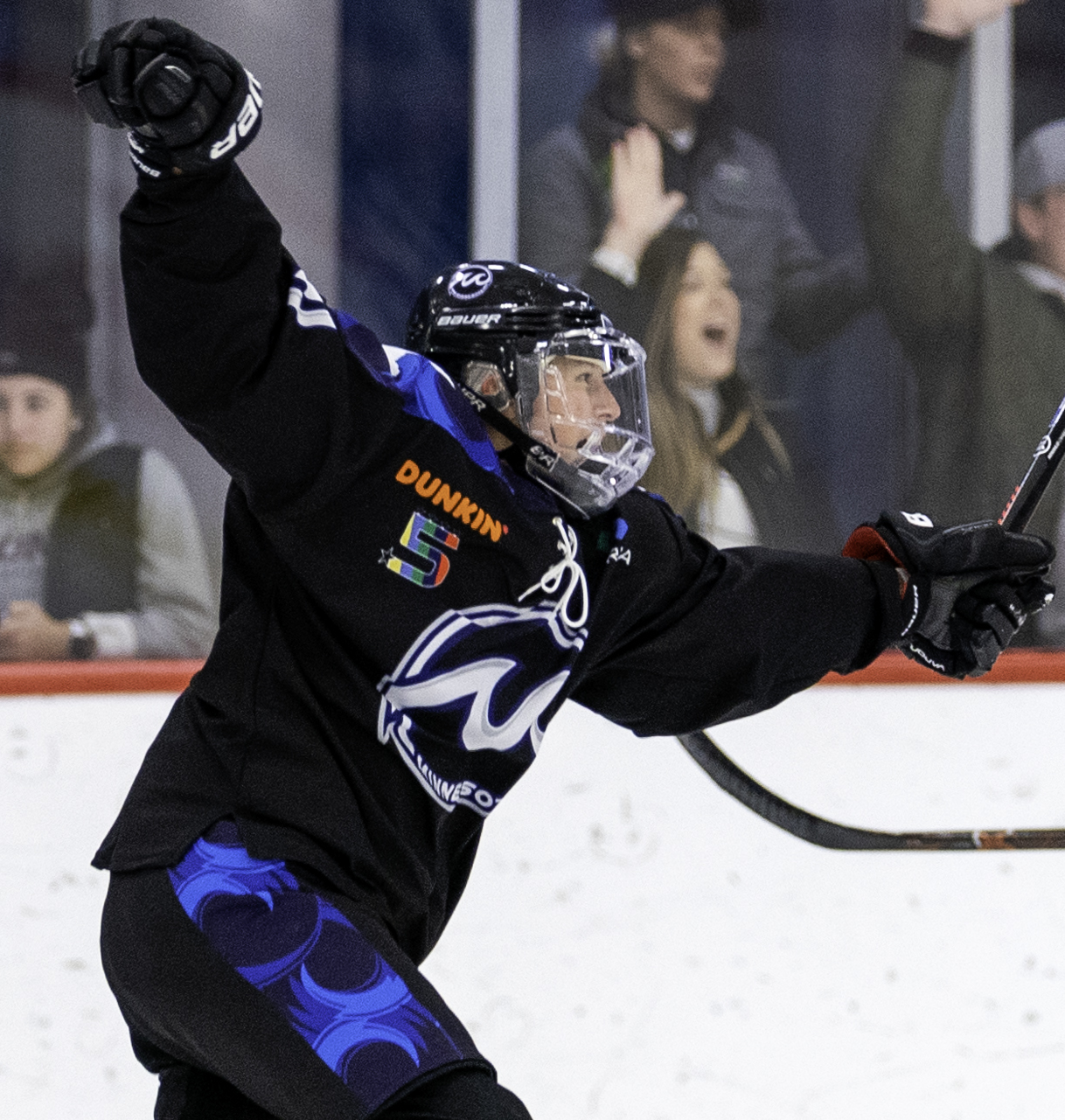
- Richards in 2019
- Born: July 19, 1994 (age 30); Maplewood, Minnesota, United States
- Height: 173 cm (5 ft 8 in)
- Position: Forward (ice hockey)
- Shot: Right
- Played for: Minnesota Whitecaps; Metropolitan Riveters; University of Maine
- Playing career: 2018–2022

Audra Morrison (née Richards) is a former American ice hockey forward who most recently played for the Minnesota Whitecaps of the Premier Hockey Federation.

== Career ==
Over four years at the University of Maine, Richards set the team record for games played with 132, and put up 45 goals (the fifth most in team history), being selected to the Hockey East All-Academic Team four times.

On July 9, 2018, Richards signed her first professional contract, with the Metropolitan Riveters of the NWHL. In her rookie season, she put up 8 goals in 16 games. After just one year with the Riveters, however, she signed with the Minnesota Whitecaps. In her first season with the Whitecaps, she put up 20 points in 24 games, and was named to Team Packer for the All-Star Game.

== Personal life ==
Richards has a degree in kinesiology, and has taught physical education in Minnesota. She originally played soccer, before switching to hockey.

Her parents designed the Minnesota Whitecaps' mascot Cappy, unveiled in January 2020.

== Career statistics ==
			Regular season					Playoffs
Season	Team	League	GP	G	A	Pts	PIM	GP	G	A	Pts	PIM
2012–13	Maine	Hockey East	33	7	6	13	24	–	–	–	–	–
2013–14	Maine	Hockey East	31	15	3	18	16	–	–	–	–	–
2014–15	Maine	Hockey East	33	9	8	17	6	–	–	–	–	–
2015–16	Maine	Hockey East	35	14	8	22	18	–	–	–	–	–
2018–19	Metropolitan Riveters	NWHL	16	8	0	8	4	2	2	0	2	2
2019–20	Minnesota Whitecaps	NWHL	24	9	11	20	2	1	0	0	0	0
2020–21	Minnesota Whitecaps	NWHL	4	1	3	4	2	2	3	2	4	0
2021–22	Minnesota Whitecaps	PHF	20	10	5	15	21	2	1	2	3	0
NCAA totals			132	45	25	70	64	–	–	–	–	–
NWHL/PHF totals			64	28	19	47	29	7	6	4	10	2
