= Meghan Lorence =

American ice hockey forward (born 1992)

- Born: June 25, 1992 (age 32); Mounds View, Minnesota, United States
- Height: 168 cm (5 ft 6 in)
- Position: Forward
- Shoots: Left
- PHF team: Minnesota Whitecaps
- Played for: University of Minnesota
- National team: United States
- Playing career: 2019–present

Meghan Lorence is an American ice hockey forward, currently playing for the Minnesota Whitecaps of the Premier Hockey Federation (PHF).

== Career ==
Across 4 years at the University of Minnesota, Lorence put up 102 points in 158 games, serving as an assistant captain in her final year. The team would be NCAA national champions three times during her tenure.

In 2019, she signed her first professional contract with the Minnesota Whitecaps of the NWHL. She was named to the 2020 NWHL All-Star Game.

=== International ===
In 2010, she represented the US at the U18 IIHF U18 Women's World Championships, winning a silver medal.
