= Amanda Boulier =

American ice hockey player (born 1993)

- Boulier with the Minnesota Whitecaps in 2019
- Born: March 30, 1993 (age 33) Watertown, Connecticut, US
- Height: 5 ft 1 in (155 cm)
- Position: Defense
- Shoots: Right
- PWHL team Former teams: Boston Fleet: Montreal Victoire; PWHL Ottawa; Minnesota Whitecaps; Boston Pride; Connecticut Whale
- Coached for: Yale Bulldogs; Marshall Hilltoppers
- Playing career: 2011–present
- Coaching career: 2016–present

Amanda Boulier (born March 30, 1993) is an American ice hockey player and coach, currently playing for the Boston Fleet of the Professional Women's Hockey League (PWHL).

== Early life ==
Amanda Boulier was raised in Watertown by her father, Peter, a plumber, and her mother, Elizabeth, a registered nurse, alongside her two older brothers, Jason and Chad. Her passion for ice hockey began at the Mays Rink at Taft School, where she watched her brothers participate in Watertown Youth Hockey. Boulier has often credited the coaching she received as a youth as a major factor in her success in the sport.

Boulier later played for the Connecticut Polar Bears girls hockey program and attended prep school at Westminster School, before attending St. Lawrence University.

== Career ==
St. Lawrence University won the Eastern College Athletic Conference in her rookie NCAA season, where she scored 20 points in 38 games and was named to the ECAC All-Rookie Team. After missing the 2013–14 season due to injury, Boulier returned to the St. Lawrence lineup and was named team captain.

In 2017, she signed with the Connecticut Whale of the NWHL. After just one year with the Whale, she signed with the Minnesota Whitecaps, where she would win the Isobel Cup. be named a finalist for Defender of the Year and one of the Fans’ Three Stars of the Season in 2019. She has been named to the NWHL All-Star Game three times.

In June 2020, she became the first defender to re-sign with the Whitecaps for the 2020–21 NWHL season. She chose to opt-out of the COVID-19 bubble season, however.

In September 2021, she announced that she had signed with the defending Isobel Cup champions, the Boston Pride. She spent a single season in Boston, winning her second Isobel Cup, before returning to the Whitecaps.

Boulier playing a tuba at the parade celebrating Montreal's 2026 Walter Cup championship

Boulier was drafted in the 13th round of the 2023 PWHL Draft by Ottawa. She was traded to Montreal on March 18, 2024, in exchange for forward Tereza Vanišová. On June 17, 2024, she signed a two-year contract extension with Montreal. After winning the Walter Cup with Montreal in the 2025-26 season, Boulier signed a two-year contract with the Boston Fleet.

== International career ==
Boulier represented the United States at the 2011 IIHF World Women's U18 Championship, putting up four points in five games as the country won gold.

== Coaching career ==
From 2016 to 2018, Boulier served as an assistant coach for the NCAA Division I Yale Bulldogs. During her time with the Whale, she also served as a coach with Chelsea Piers Connecticut. In April 2020, she was named head coach for the Marshall School's girls' ice hockey team.

== Career statistics ==
| | | | Regular season | | | | | Playoffs |
| Season | Team | League | GP | G | A | Pts | PIM | GP | G | A | Pts | PIM |
|---|---|---|---|---|---|---|---|---|---|---|---|---|
| 2011-12 | St. Lawrence Saints | NCAA | 38 | 4 | 16 | 20 | 18 | - | - | - | - | - |
| 2012-13 | St. Lawrence Saints | NCAA | 34 | 8 | 24 | 32 | 28 | - | - | - | - | - |
| 2013-14 | St. Lawrence Saints | NCAA | - | - | - | - | - | - | - | - | - | - |
| 2014-15 | St. Lawrence Saints | NCAA | 36 | 6 | 17 | 23 | 12 | - | - | - | - | - |
| 2015-16 | St. Lawrence Saints | NCAA | 38 | 10 | 19 | 29 | 10 | - | - | - | - | - |
| 2017–18 | Connecticut Whale | NWHL | 12 | 3 | 5 | 9 | 0 | 1 | 0 | 0 | 0 | 2 |
| 2018–19 | Minnesota Whitecaps | NWHL | 16 | 5 | 8 | 13 | 16 | 2 | 1 | 1 | 2 | 2 |
| 2019–20 | Minnesota Whitecaps | NWHL | 22 | 6 | 21 | 27 | 10 | 1 | 0 | 0 | 0 | 0 |
| 2020–21 | Minnesota Whitecaps | NWHL | 0 | 0 | 0 | 0 | 0 | 2 | 0 | 0 | 0 | 0 |
| 2021–22 | Boston Pride | PHF | 20 | 2 | 9 | 11 | 4 | 3 | 0 | 3 | 3 | 0 |
| 2022–23 | Minnesota Whitecaps | PHF | 24 | 0 | 8 | 8 | 10 | 3 | 0 | 0 | 0 | 0 |
| 2023–24 | PWHL Ottawa | PWHL | 17 | 1 | 5 | 6 | 2 | - | - | - | - | - |
| 2023–24 | PWHL Montreal | PWHL | 6 | 0 | 3 | 3 | 0 | 3 | 0 | 0 | 0 | 2 |
| 2024–25 | Montreal Victoire | PWHL | 25 | 1 | 5 | 6 | 4 | 4 | 0 | 0 | 0 | 0 |
| 2025–26 | Montreal Victoire | PWHL | 30 | 0 | 3 | 3 | 8 | 9 | 0 | 0 | 0 | 6 |
| NCAA totals | | | 150 | 28 | 76 | 104 | 68 | – | – | – | – | – |
| NWHL/PHF totals | | | 94 | 16 | 51 | 67 | 40 | 12 | 1 | 4 | 5 | 4 |
| PWHL totals | | | 78 | 2 | 16 | 18 | 14 | 16 | 0 | 0 | 0 | 8 |

== Awards and honors ==
- 2025 PWHL Intact Impact Award (honors one player from each team who best displayed leadership, integrity and commitment)

== Personal life ==
Boulier is married Harvard Crimson women's ice hockey head coach Laura Bellamy on July 19, 2025.

== Awards and honours ==
| Honours | Year |
PWHL
| Walter Cup champion | 2026 |
