= Chelsey Brodt-Rosenthal =

American ice hockey player

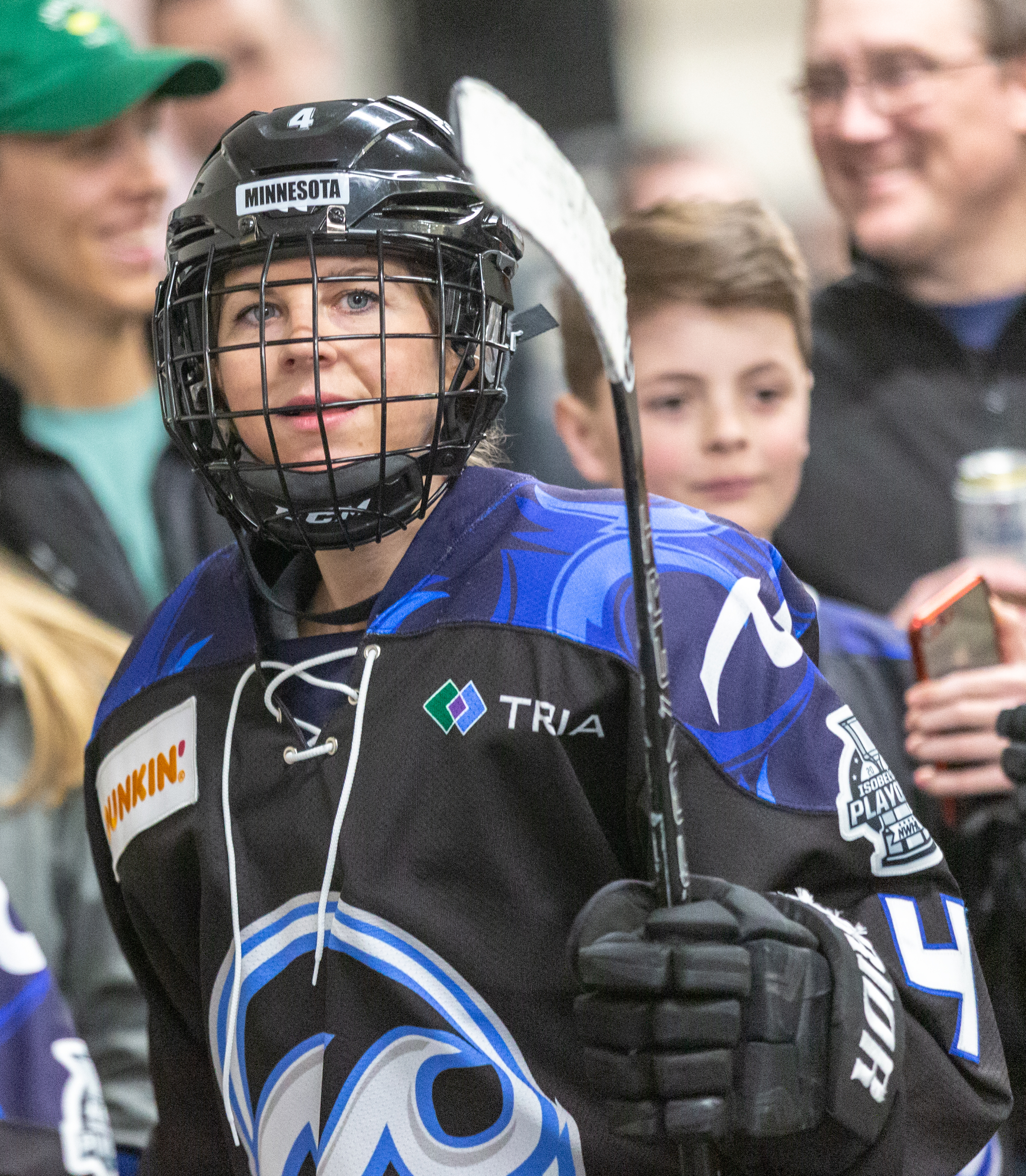
- Brodt-Rosenthal with the Minnesota Whitecaps in 2019
- Born: December 7, 1983 (age 42) Roseville, Minnesota, U.S.
- Height: 5 ft 4 in (163 cm)
- Position: Defence
- Shot: Right
- Played for: Minnesota Whitecaps; Minnesota Golden Gophers
- Playing career: 2002–2022

Chelsey Brodt-Rosenthal (born December 7, 1983) is an American former ice hockey defender who most recently played with the Minnesota Whitecaps of the Premier Hockey Federation (PHF).

== Playing career ==
During her teenage years, Brodt-Rosenthal played for Roseville Area High School in her hometown of Roseville, Minnesota, winning the state championship in 1999.

From 2002 to 2006, she played for the Minnesota Golden Gophers women's ice hockey program, scoring 43 points in 151 NCAA Division I games played. She won a national championship with the team in 2004.

In 2010, she won the Clarkson Cup with the independent Minnesota Whitecaps, scoring the opening goal three minutes into the championship game in a 4–0 victory over the Brampton Thunder.

She stayed with the Whitecaps as the team joined the NWHL in 2018, picking up four points in fourteen games in her debut NWHL season and helping the team to an Isobel Cup championship.

=== Style of play ===
Brodt-Rosenthal is known for a physical and defensive style of play. During her time with the Minnesota Golden Gophers, her plus/minus (+/-) per season never dropped below +15, and she notched a total of 146 penalty minutes. In her first NWHL season with the Whitecaps, she finished tied for third on the team in blocked shots.

== Personal life ==
Brodt-Rosenthal comes from a large family of Minnesotan hockey players. Her father, Jack Brodt, co-founded the Whitecaps and currently serves as the team's general manager, while her sister Winny Brodt-Brown currently plays alongside her for the club. Her niece, Madeline Wethington, has represented the United States at three different IIHF World Women's U18 Championships. In 2017, she and her family were inducted into the Herb Brooks Foundation Youth Hockey Hall of Fame.

Outside of hockey, she has worked as a trainer for Life Time Fitness and as the Midwest Customer Manager for Clif Bar.

== Career statistics ==
=== Regular season and playoffs ===
| | | | Regular season | | | | | Playoffs |
| Season | Team | League | GP | G | A | Pts | PIM | GP | G | A | Pts | PIM |
|---|---|---|---|---|---|---|---|---|---|---|---|---|
| 2002–03 | Minnesota Golden Gophers | WCHA | 34 | 1 | 6 | 7 | 22 | – | – | – | – | – |
| 2003–04 | Minnesota Golden Gophers | WCHA | 36 | 2 | 6 | 8 | 38 | – | – | – | – | – |
| 2004–05 | Minnesota Golden Gophers | WCHA | 40 | 4 | 13 | 17 | 22 | – | – | – | – | – |
| 2005–06 | Minnesota Golden Gophers | WCHA | 41 | 0 | 11 | 11 | 34 | – | – | – | – | – |
| 2008–09 | Minnesota Whitecaps | WWHL | 8 | 1 | 2 | 3 | 16 | 2 | 0 | 1 | 1 | 2 |
| 2015–16 | Minnesota Whitecaps | Independent | – | – | – | – | – | – | – | – | – | – |
| 2016–17 | Minnesota Whitecaps | Independent | – | – | – | – | – | – | – | – | – | – |
| 2017–18 | Minnesota Whitecaps | Independent | – | – | – | – | – | – | – | – | – | – |
| 2018–19 | Minnesota Whitecaps | NWHL | 14 | 0 | 4 | 4 | 10 | 2 | 0 | 0 | 0 | 2 |
| 2019–20 | Minnesota Whitecaps | NWHL | 22 | 0 | 3 | 3 | 16 | 1 | 0 | 0 | 0 | 0 |
| 2020–21 | Minnesota Whitecaps | NWHL | 4 | 0 | 0 | 0 | 6 | 2 | 0 | 0 | 0 | 0 |
| 2021–22 | Minnesota Whitecaps | PHF | 20 | 0 | 2 | 2 | 24 | 2 | 0 | 0 | 0 | 2 |
| NCAA totals | | | 151 | 7 | 36 | 43 | 146 | – | – | – | – | – |
| WWHL totals | | | 8 | 1 | 2 | 3 | 16 | 2 | 0 | 1 | 1 | 2 |
| PHF totals | | | 60 | 0 | 9 | 9 | 56 | 7 | 0 | 0 | 0 | 4 |
