= Sydney Baldwin =

American ice hockey player

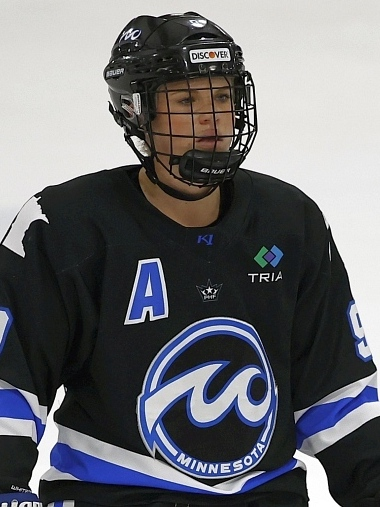
- Baldwin with the Minnesota Whitecaps in 2023
- Born: January 15, 1996 (age 30) Minnetonka, Minnesota, US
- Height: 173 cm (5 ft 8 in)
- Position: Defense
- Shoots: Left
- PHF team Former teams: Minnesota Whitecaps: Minnesota Golden Gophers; EHV Sabres Wien
- Coached for: St. Catherine Wildcats
- Playing career: 2014–present
- Coaching career: 2019–present

Sydney Baldwin (born January 15, 1996) is an American ice hockey defender, who last played for the Minnesota Whitecaps of the Premier Hockey Federation (PHF) in 2023.

== Playing career ==
In 2014, Baldwin received the Minnesota Ms. Hockey Award and was named the Star Tribune Metro Player of the Year.

Across 151 games with the Golden Gophers women's ice hockey program of the University of Minnesota, Baldwin put up 81 points. In 2018, she was named a finalist for the Patty Kazmaier Award.

After graduating, she signed with EHV Sabres of the European Women's Hockey League (EWHL). Putting up 19 points in 10 games, she was named to the EWHL All-Star Team.

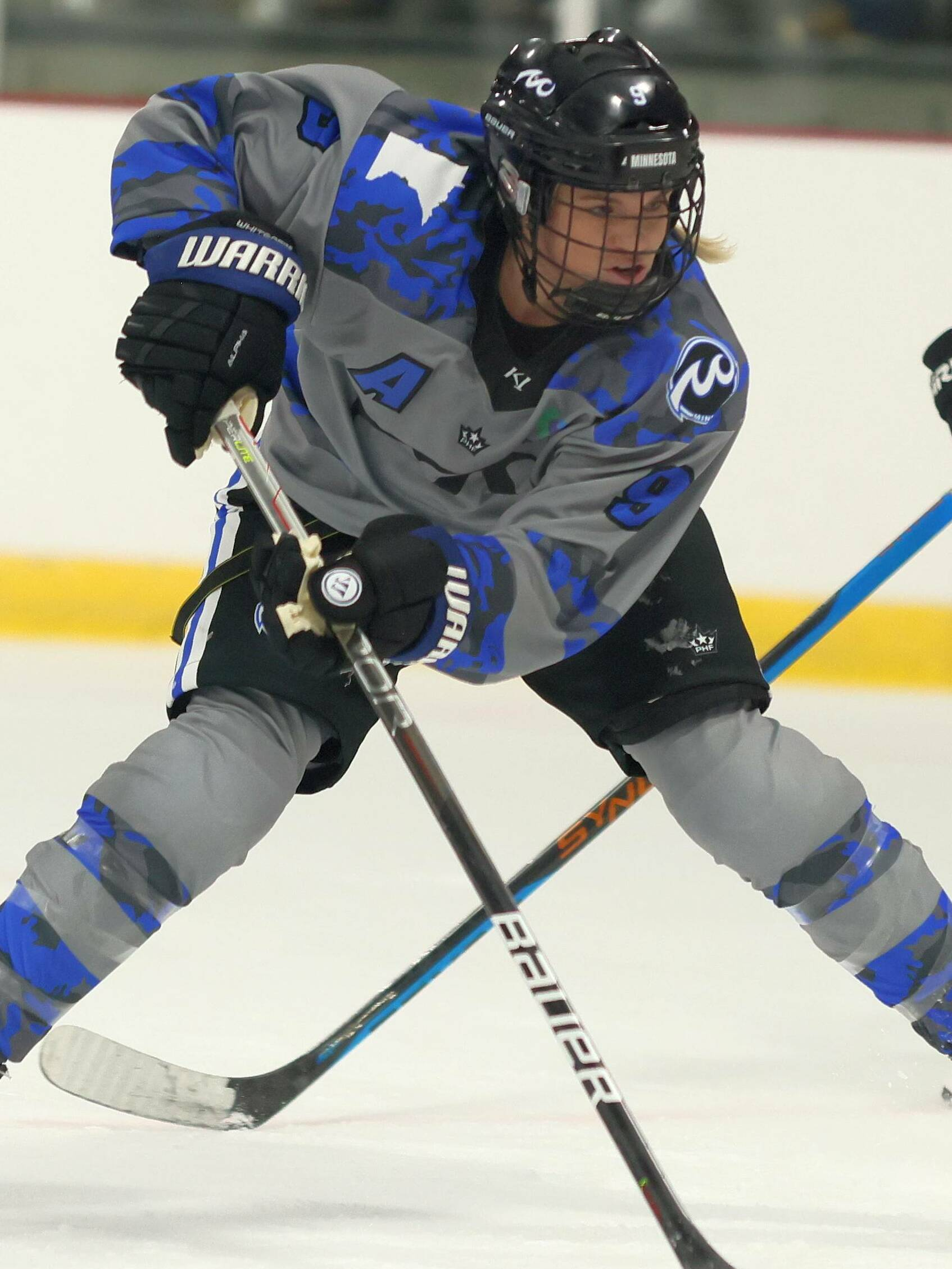
Baldwin with the Whitecaps in 2022

On September 3, 2019, Baldwin signed with the Minnesota Whitecaps of the National Women's Hockey League (NWHL; rebranded as PHF in 2021). After scoring 18 points in 17 games in her rookie season, she was named to the 2020 All-Star Game, but was ultimately unable to participate.

=== International ===
Baldwin represented the United States at the IIHF U18 Women's World Championships in 2013 and 2014, winning a silver medal both times. In 2014, she served as an alternate captain.

== Personal life ==
Baldwin holds a bachelor’s degree in health services management and human resources development from the University of Minnesota and a Master of Science in nursing from St. Catherine University. During her graduate studies at St. Catherine University, she served as an assistant coach to the St. Catherine Wildcats women's ice hockey program in the Minnesota Intercollegiate Athletic Conference (MIAC) of the NCAA Division III.

== Career statistics ==
=== Regular season and playoffs ===
Note: GP = Games played; G = Goals; A = Assists; Pts = Points; PIM = Penalty minutes;

			Regular season					Playoffs
Season	Team	League	GP	G	A	Pts	PIM	GP	G	A	Pts	PIM
2014–15	Minnesota Golden Gophers	WCHA	41	5	6	11	8	—	—	—	—	—
2015–16	Minnesota Golden Gophers	WCHA	40	5	17	22	6	—	—	—	—	—
2016–17	Minnesota Golden Gophers	WCHA	39	2	14	16	26	—	—	—	—	—
2017–18	Minnesota Golden Gophers	WCHA	38	12	20	32	16	—	—	—	—	—
2018–19	EHB Sabres	EWHL	10	6	13	19	8	5	6	4	10	2
2019–20	Minnesota Whitecaps	NWHL	17	8	10	18	14	1	0	0	0	0
2020–21	Minnesota Whitecaps	NWHL	4	1	2	3	4	1	0	0	0	0
2021–22	Minnesota Whitecaps	PHF	2	1	1	2	4	2	1	2	3	0
2022–23	Minnesota Whitecaps	PHF	24	3	4	7	14	3	0	1	1	0
NCAA totals			158	24	57	81	56	—	—	—	—	—
EWHL totals			10	6	13	19	8	5	6	4	10	2
NWHL/PHF totals			47	13	17	30	30	20	6	14	20	14

=== International ===
Note: GP = Games played; G = Goals; A = Assists; Pts = Points; PIM = Penalty minutes;

				Regular season
Year	Team	Event	Result	GP	G	A	Pts	PIM
2013	United States	U18	2nd place, silver medalist(s)	5	0	0	0	0
2014	United States	U18	2nd place, silver medalist(s)	5	3	2	5	2
Junior totals				10	1	2	3	2
