= Winny Brodt-Brown =

American ice hockey player (born 1978)

- Born: February 18, 1978 (age 48) Roseville, Minnesota, U.S.
- Height: 5 ft 4 in (163 cm)
- Weight: 130 lb (59 kg; 9 st 4 lb)
- Position: Defense
- Shot: Left
- Played for: Minnesota Whitecaps; Minnesota Golden Gophers
- National team: United States
- Playing career: 1996–2022
Medal record
Representing United States
Women's ice hockey
IIHF World Women's Championships
Silver medal – second place	2000 Canada	Tournament
Silver medal – second place	2001 United States	Tournament

Winny Brodt-Brown (born February 18, 1978) is an American former ice hockey player. She was the first winner of the Minnesota Ms. Hockey Award in 1996. She won a silver medal at the 2000 and 2001 IIHF Women's World ice hockey championships.

She played for the Minnesota Whitecaps and was a member when the team won the Western Women's Hockey League championship during the 2008–09 season and the 2010 Clarkson Cup. She was also a member of the Whitecaps when the team won the Isobel Cup during their first year as a member of the Premier Hockey Federation (then the National Women's Hockey League) during the 2018–19 season.

== Playing career ==
=== USA Hockey ===
Her first exposure to USA Hockey came in 1995 with the US Junior Team and returned the following year in 1996. She was a participant at the USA Hockey Women's Festival in 1998, 1999, and 2000. She had several years experience with the United States national women's team. In addition, she was part of the Team USA squad that competed in the 1998 Three Nations Cup. She participated at the 2000 IIHF women's championships. The following year, in 2001 she participated in the World Championships also. She appeared in 5 games and registered 0 points.

=== Minnesota Whitecaps ===
Upon leaving the University of Minnesota, she joined the Western Women's Hockey League (WWHL) Minnesota Whitecaps in their inaugural 2004–05 season. In 2006, she was joined by her sister Chelsey Brodt-Rosenthal. They played every season with the Whitecaps, including their 2010 Clarkson Cup win, and through the team's independent years after the dissolution of the WWHL in 2011. Both signed contracts with the Whitecaps for its inaugural 2018–19 season in the professional Premier Hockey Federation (PHF, originally the National Women's Hockey League). She announced her retirement from the Whitecaps on August 16, 2022.

== Career statistics ==
=== Regular season and playoffs ===
			Regular season					Playoffs
Season	Team	League	GP	G	A	Pts	PIM	GP	G	A	Pts	PIM
1997–98	University of New Hampshire	NCAA	39	11	23	34	-	-	-	-	-	-
1998–99	University of Minnesota	NCAA	24	14	31	45	12	-	-	-	-	-
1999–2000	University of Minnesota	NCAA	28	13	37	50	26	-	-	-	-	-
2002–03	University of Minnesota	NCAA	34	14	25	39	22	-	-	-	-	-
2004–05	Minnesota Whitecaps	WWHL	12	2	8	10	16	-	-	-	-	-
2005–06	Minnesota Whitecaps	WWHL	8	0	3	3	16	-	-	-	-	-
2006–07	Minnesota Whitecaps	WWHL	24	5	11	16	22	-	-	-	-	-
2007–08	Minnesota Whitecaps	WWHL	19	5	5	10	14	-	-	-	-	-
2008–09	Minnesota Whitecaps	WWHL	14	1	8	9	16	-	-	-	-	-
2009–10	Minnesota Whitecaps	WWHL	12	2	8	10	4	-	-	-	-	-
2010–11	Minnesota Whitecaps	WWHL	18	7	14	21	10	-	-	-	-	-
2017–18	Minnesota Whitecaps	Independent	-	-	-	-	-	-	-	-	-	-
2018–19	Minnesota Whitecaps	NWHL	14	0	1	1	6	2	0	0	0	0
2019–20	Minnesota Whitecaps	NWHL	20	0	5	5	10	1	0	0	0	0
2020–21	Minnesota Whitecaps	NWHL	4	1	0	1	4	2	0	2	2	2
2021–22	Minnesota Whitecaps	PHF	11	0	0	0	4	2	0	0	0	0
NCAA totals			124	52	116	168	60	—	–	–	–	–
WWHL totals			107	22	57	79	98	—	–	–	–	–
PHF totals			49	1	6	7	24	7	0	2	2	2

=== International ===
Year	Team	Event	Result	GP	G	A	Pts	PIM
2000	United States	WWC	2nd place, silver medalist(s)	5	0	5	5	0
2001	United States	WWC	2nd place, silver medalist(s)	5	0	0	0	0
World Championship totals				10	0	5	5	0

== Awards and honors ==
- Ms. Hockey Award: 1996
- Top 3 finalists for Minnesota Sports Channel 1996 Athlete of the Year award
- Most valuable player: 1998 AWCHA Championship
- WCHA Defensive Player of the Year: 1999–2000
- Top 10 finalist for the Patty Kazmaier Award: 1999–2000
- 1998 AWCHA Tournament Most Outstanding player
- 1999 Patty Berg Academic Award winner
- 2000 AWCHA All-Tournament Team
- 2000 WCHA Defensive Player of the Year
- First-team All-WCHA (2000)
- WCHA All-Academic Team member (2000)
- WCHA All-Tournament pick (2000)
- Peggy MacInnis Bye Scholarship award winner (2000)
- Academic All-Big Ten (2000)
- Patty Berg Academic Award honoree (2000)
- Western Women's Hockey League Defensive Player of the Year, 2006–07

== Group affiliations ==
- Herb Brooks Foundation Board Member (2008–2009)
- OS Hockey Training Director (2003–present)

== Personal ==
She is married to Justin Brown. She is also an instructor for the Highland Central Hockey Association in St. Paul, Minnesota.
