= Emma Stauber =

American ice hockey forward (born 1993)

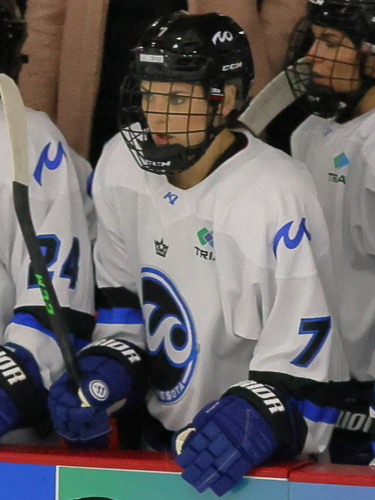
- Stauber with the Minnesota Whitecaps in 2022
- Born: April 6, 1993 (age 32); Duluth, Minnesota, U.S.
- Height: 171 cm (5 ft 7 in)
- Position: Defense
- Shot: Left
- PHF team Former teams: Minnesota Whitecaps; HV71; Minnesota Duluth Bulldogs
- Coached for: Proctor-Hermantown Mirage
- Playing career: 2015–2023
- Coaching career: 2019–present

Emma Stauber (born April 6, 1993) is an American former professional ice hockey defender known for her association with the Minnesota Whitecaps. She played college hockey for the Minnesota Duluth Bulldogs, serving as captain in her senior year.

== Career ==
Stauber began playing hockey at the age of four, originally wanting to be a goaltender like her uncle, but was discouraged from the position by her father, who advised her she'd have a better chance of making a team as a defender. During high school, she played for the Proctor-Hermantown-Marshall Mirage, leading her team in scoring in her final year. She was named to the 2011 Minnesota Associated Press Girls Second All-State Team.

From 2011 to 2015, she attended the University of Minnesota Duluth, playing for the Bulldogs' women's ice hockey programme, who she had grown up cheering for. Switching from an offensive defender style of play to a more stay-at-home style, she accumulated a total of 23 points across 142 NCAA games. In her senior year, she was named team captain, the first player from Duluth to be named captain for the University of Minnesota-Duluth's women's hockey team. She was named to the WCHA All-Academic Team three times, and won the WCHA Scholar-Athlete award in 2015.

After graduating, she signed for HV71 of the Riksserien. She put up 13 points in 19 games in her rookie professional season, leading her team's defenders in scoring as HV71 finished in sixth place.

After just one year in Sweden, she returned to the United States to sign with the independent Minnesota Whitecaps. She stayed with the Whitecaps as they joined the National Women's Hockey League in 2018. She scored five points in fifteen games in the Whitecaps' debut NWHL season, helping the team to an Isobel Cup victory.

== Personal life ==
Stauber has a bachelor's degree in exercise science from the University of Minnesota Duluth and a master's degree in sports leadership from Northeastern University. Her uncle, Robb Stauber, played 62 games in the National Hockey League in the early 1990s, and was briefly rumoured to be named Whitecaps head coach in 2018.

In 2019, she was named head coach of the girls' hockey programme at Proctor-Hermantown High School.

== Career statistics ==
=== Regular season and playoffs ===
			Regular season					Playoffs
Season	Team	League	GP	G	A	Pts	PIM	GP	G	A	Pts	PIM
2011–12	University of Minnesota Duluth	WCHA	36	0	3	3	10	—	—	—	—	—
2012–13	University of Minnesota Duluth	WCHA	34	1	4	5	16	—	—	—	—	—
2013–14	University of Minnesota Duluth	WCHA	36	1	5	6	20	—	—	—	—	—
2014–15	University of Minnesota Duluth	WCHA	36	1	8	9	26	–	–	–	–	–
2015–16	HV71	Riksserien	19	6	7	13	18	—	—	—	—	—
2016–17	Minnesota Whitecaps	Ind.	—	—	—	—	—	—	—	—	—	—
2017–18	Minnesota Whitecaps	Ind.	—	—	—	—	—	—	—	—	—	—
2018–19	Minnesota Whitecaps	NWHL	15	1	4	5	12	2	0	0	0	2
2019–20	Minnesota Whitecaps	NWHL	10	0	3	3	8	2	0	0	0	2
2020–21	Minnesota Whitecaps	NWHL	4	0	1	1	10	1	0	0	0	0
2021–22	Minnesota Whitecaps	PHF	15	1	2	3	14	2	0	0	0	0
2022–23	Minnesota Whitecaps	PHF	14	0	0	0	2	3	0	0	0	0
WCHA totals			142	3	20	23	72	—	—	—	—	—
NWHL/PHF totals			58	2	10	12	46	10	0	0	0	4
