= Jonna Albers =

American ice hockey player

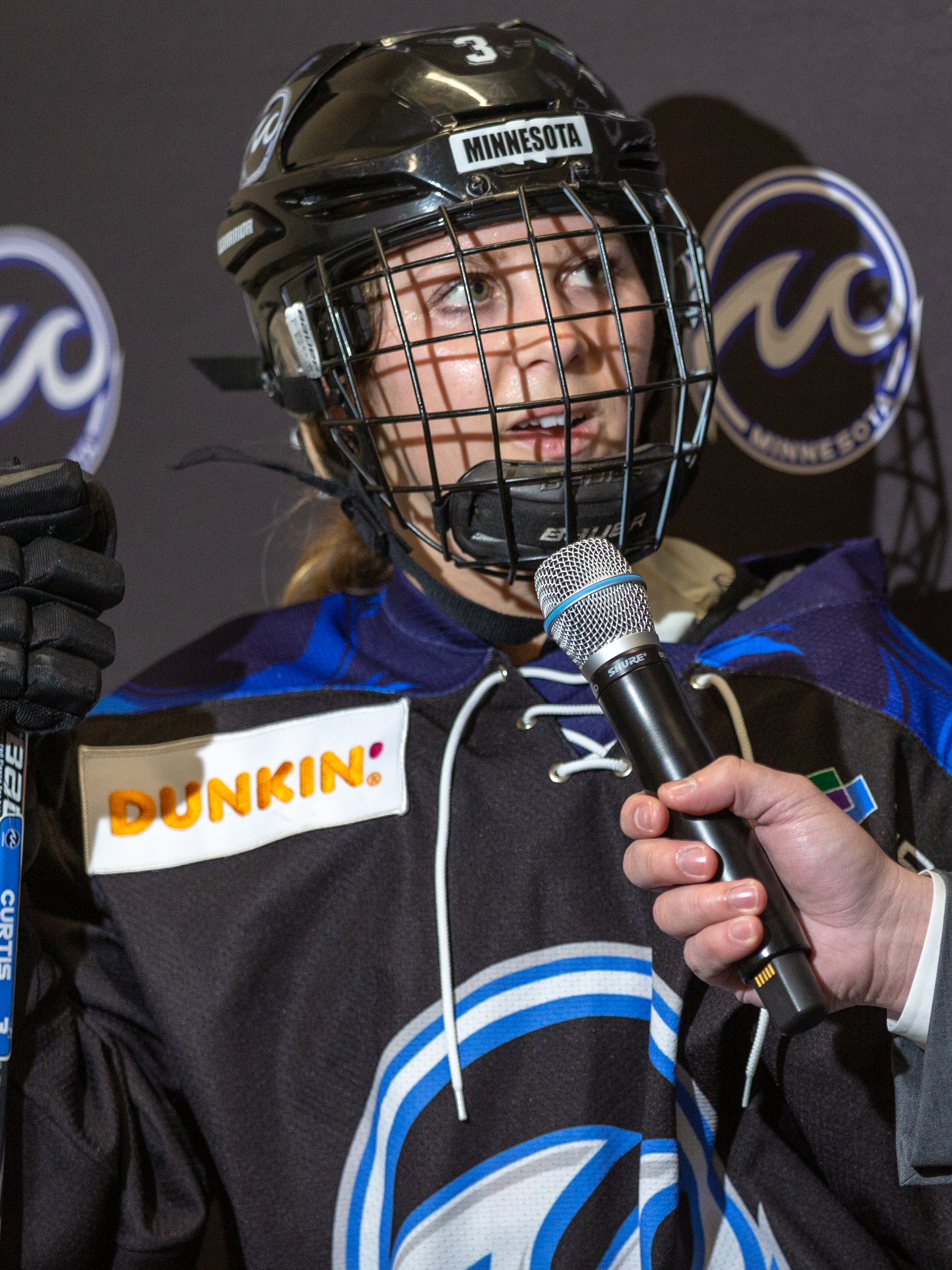
- Albers with the Minnesota Whitecaps in 2018
- Born: February 28, 1994 (age 32) Elk River, Minnesota, US
- Height: 5 ft 4 in (163 cm)
- Position: Forward
- Shot: Right
- PHF team Former teams: Minnesota Whitecaps; New Hampshire Wildcats
- Playing career: 2012–2023

Jonna Albers (née Curtis, born February 28, 1994) is an American former ice hockey player who played in the now defunct Premier Hockey Federation (PHF) with the Minnesota Whitecaps, who she won an Isobel Cup with in 2019. Prior to that, she captained the New Hampshire Wildcats women's ice hockey team, twice earning a Hockey East All-Star Honorable Mention.

== Career ==
As a youth player, Albers was a finalist for the Minnesota Ms. Hockey award in 2012, and set the Elk River High School scoring records in points and assists.

From 2012 to 2017, she attended the University of New Hampshire, scoring 106 points in 122 NCAA games.

She originally planned on retiring from hockey after her college ice hockey career, until the expansion to Minnesota was announced by the National Women's Hockey League (NWHL; renamed PHF in 2021).

After the 2018–19 season, she was named NWHL Newcomer of the Year, and was named to both the 2019 and 2020 NWHL All-Star teams, playing as one of the top scorers for the Whitecaps. In 2019, the Whitecaps won the Isobel Cup, and made it to the finals in 2020, before the COVID-19 pandemic indefinitely postponed the game.

== Personal life ==
Outside of hockey, Albers works as an engineer.

== Career statistics ==
			Regular season					Playoffs
Season	Team	League	GP	G	A	Pts	PIM	GP	G	A	Pts	PIM
2012–13	New Hampshire Wildcats	ECAC	5	2	4	6	2	–	–	–	–	–
2013–14	New Hampshire Wildcats	ECAC	10	2	1	3	0	–	–	–	–	–
2014–15	New Hampshire Wildcats	ECAC	36	13	9	22	10	–	–	–	–	–
2015–16	New Hampshire Wildcats	ECAC	36	16	17	33	14	–	–	–	–	–
2016–17	New Hampshire Wildcats	ECAC	35	21	21	42	36	–	–	–	–	–
2018–19	Minnesota Whitecaps	NWHL	16	8	11	19	12	2	0	1	1	0
2019–20	Minnesota Whitecaps	NWHL	21	14	22	36	10	1	0	1	1	2
2020–21	Minnesota Whitecaps	NWHL	4	1	0	1	0	2	0	4	4	0
2021–22	Minnesota Whitecaps	PHF	20	9	15	24	18	2	0	3	3	2
2022–23	Minnesota Whitecaps	PHF	24	10	10	20	12	3	5	1	6	0
NCAA totals			122	54	52	106	62	–	–	–	–	–
PHF totals			85	42	58	100	52	10	5	10	15	4
