= Amanda Leveille =

Canadian ice hockey player (born 1994)

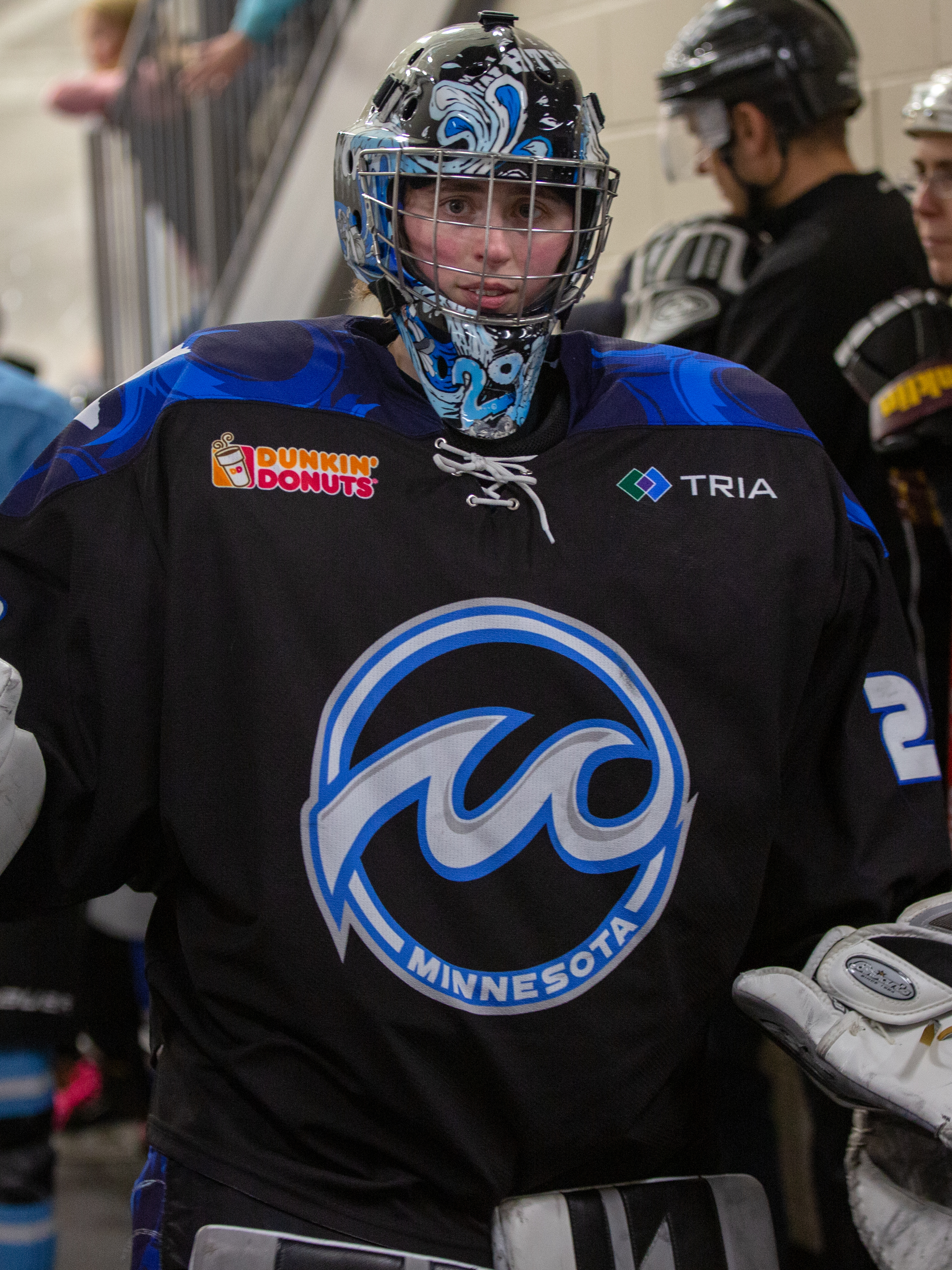
- Leveille with the Minnesota Whitecaps in 2018
- Born: 10 June 1994 (age 32) Brossard, Quebec, Canada
- Height: 5 ft 7 in (170 cm)
- Position: Goaltender
- Caught: Left
- Played for: Buffalo Beauts; Minnesota Whitecaps
- Playing career: 2016–2024

Amanda Leveille (born 10 June 1994) is a Canadian former professional ice hockey goaltender. Formerly a member of the Buffalo Beauts and Minnesota Whitecaps of the Premier Hockey Federation (PHF), Leveille holds the PHF all-time records for wins and shutouts, and is a two-time Isobel Cup champion.

== Career ==
=== Early career ===
As a youth player, Leveille played on AAA boys teams, being named best goaltender at the 2011 Canadian National U18 Championship. In 2011, she joined the Ottawa Lady Senators, where she would stay for her last two years of high school.

=== University ===
During college, Leveille played for the Minnesota Golden Gophers women's ice hockey program for four seasons between 2012 and 2016. She posted three shutouts in her first three starts, not giving up a single goal in the 7 games she played in her first season serving as backup to Noora Räty.

After Räty graduated, Leveille would take over the starting job. The team would win the national championship three times by the time she graduated, as she finished fifth in NCAA history for wins and sixth for shutouts.

=== Premier Hockey Federation ===
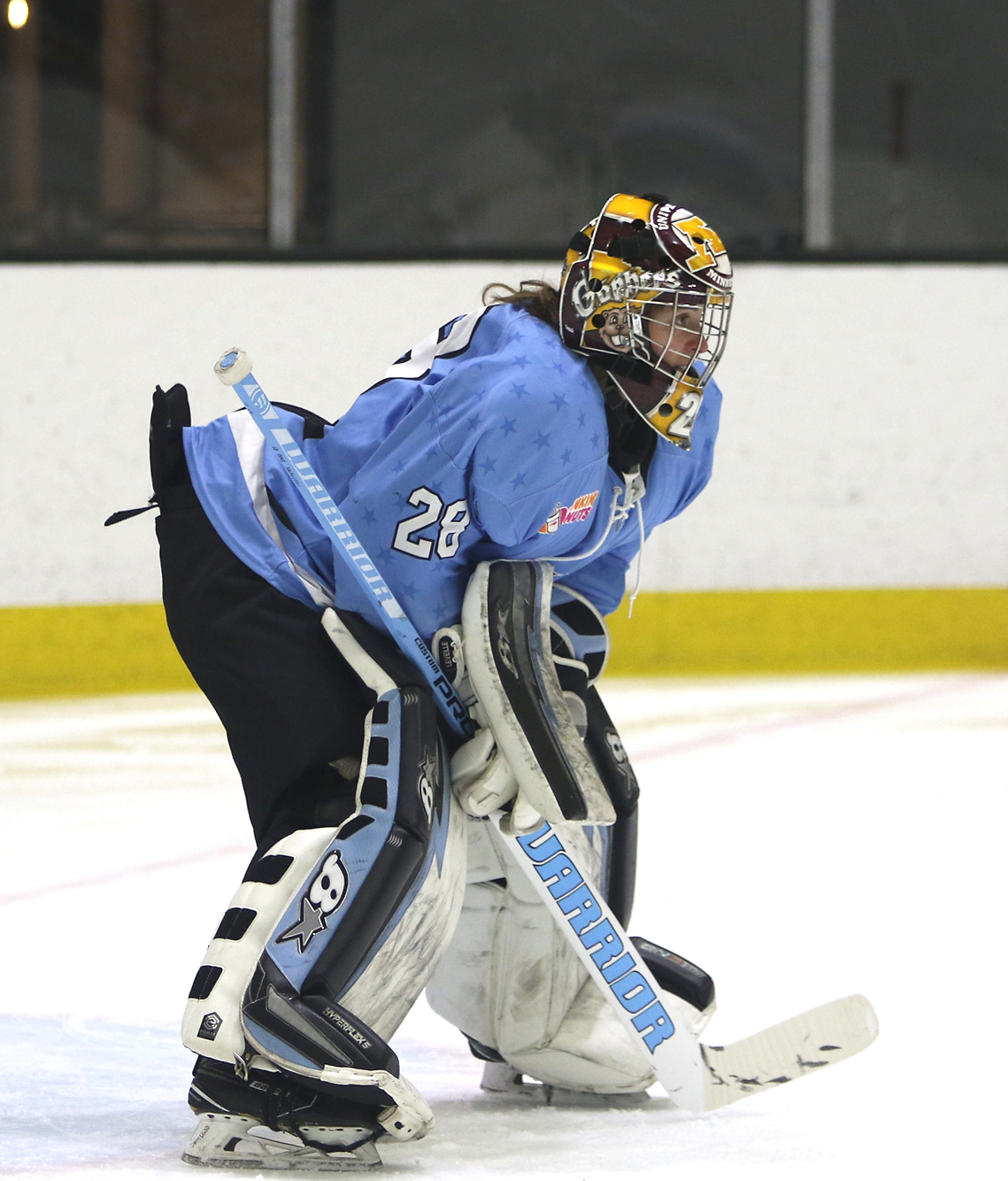
Levellle with the Buffalo Beauts in 2017

Leveille was drafted 12th overall in the 2015 NWHL draft by the Buffalo Beauts. On 28 April 2016, Leveille signed a one-year, $15,000 contract with the Beauts for the 2016–17 season. She was the first draft pick to sign a contract in league history.

Leveille won the 2017 Isobel Cup with the Buffalo Beauts. Leveille was one of the team captains at the 3rd NWHL All-Star Game during the 2017–18 season. By season's end, she was recognized as the 2018 NWHL Goaltender of the Year.

On 18 June 2018, Leveille signed with the Minnesota Whitecaps for their first season in the PHF. She was the first player to sign with the new franchise. In her first year with the Whitecaps, Leveille won the Isobel Cup for the second time.

In the 2019–20 season, Leveille would again be named to the NWHL All-Star Game, and finished as runner-up for Goaltender of the Year. She finished the season with the most minutes played and the most saves made of any goalie. The Whitecaps would make the Isobel Cup finals, marking the 4th year in a row that she has played in the finals. She would win her second Goaltender of the Year award after the 2020–21 season.

=== Professional Women's Hockey League ===
Leveille was drafted in the 11th round of the 2023 PWHL Draft by Minnesota. She won the Walter Cup in the league's inaugural season.

On 23 July 2024, Leveille announced her retirement from professional hockey.

=== International ===
Leveille has participated in Team Canada's U22 development team, but never played for the senior team.

== Personal life ==
Leveille has been noted for her humorous hockey-themed social media presence. She has named former NHL goaltender Martin Brodeur and Canadian Olympian Shannon Szabados as role models.

She attended Frontenac Secondary School, where she was an honour student, volunteering at the Royal Ottawa Hospital. She has a degree in recreation park and leisure studies.

== Career statistics ==
Note: GP = Games played; Min, TOI = Minutes played; W = Wins; L = Losses; T,T/OT = Ties; OTL = Overtime losses; GA = Goals-against; GAA = Goals-against average; SO = Shutouts; SV% = Save percentage;

			Regular season									Playoffs
Season	Team	League	GP	W	L	T/OT	MIN	GA	SO	GAA	SV%	GP	W	L	MIN	GA	SO	GAA	SV%
2010–11	Ottawa Lady Senators	Prov. WHL	19	–	–	–	–	–	–	1.61	.940	2	—	—	—	—	—	4.56	.800
2010–11	Ottawa Lady Senators	Prov. WHL	24	–	–	–	–	–	–	1.78	.937	10	—	—	—	—	—	1.61	.942
2012–13	Minnesota Golden Gophers	WCHA	7	3	0	0	279	0	3	0.00	1.000	—	—	—	—	—	—	—	—
2013–14	Minnesota Golden Gophers	WCHA	41	38	2	1	2415	49	13	1.22	.945	—	—	—	—	—	—	—	—
2014–15	Minnesota Golden Gophers	WCHA	34	28	3	3	1984	39	6	1.18	.946	—	—	—	—	—	—	—	—
2015–16	Minnesota Golden Gophers	WCHA	34	29	4	1	1957	42	10	1.29	.942	—	—	—	—	—	—	—	—
2016–17	Buffalo Beauts	NWHL	9	4	2	1	428	31	0	4.34	.890	1	1	0	60	2	0	2.00	.944
2017–18	Buffalo Beauts	NWHL	16	11	3	2	971	41	0	2.53	.918	2	1	1	120	3	0	1.50	.944
2018–19	Minnesota Whitecaps	NWHL	16	11	4	0	861	30	2	2.09	.923	2	2	0	120	2	0	0.99	.966
2019–20	Minnesota Whitecaps	NWHL	24	16	5	2	1354	47	3	2.08	.935	1	1	0	60	0	1	0.00	1.000
2020–21	Minnesota Whitecaps	NWHL	4	3	1	0	243	10	1	2.47	.936	2	1	1	118	4	1	2.04	.946
2021–22	Minnesota Whitecaps	PHF	12	4	6	1	630	25	1	2.38	.937	2	1	1	119	5	0	2.52	.926
2022–23	Minnesota Whitecaps	PHF	17	9	6	2	1013	41	0	2.43	.923	3	2	0	185	7	0	2.04	.946
2023–24	PWHL Minnesota	PWHL	0	0	0	0	0	0	0	0	0	—	—	—	—	—	—	—	—
Prov. WHL totals			43	–	–	–	–	–	–	–	–	12	—	—	—	—	—	—	—
NCAA totals			116	98	9	5	6636	130	32	1.18	.947	—	—	—	—	—	—	—	—
NWHL/PHF totals			96	59	29	0	5499	225	8	2.45	.924	13	9	3	788	23	2	1.75	.948
PWHL totals			0	0	0	0	0	0	0	0	0	—	—	—	—	—	—	—	—

== Awards and honours ==
- NWHL Co-Player of the Week, Awarded 29 January 2018
- 2018 Goaltender of the Year
- NWHL Fans’ Three Stars of the Season, 2020
- NWHL All-Star Game, 2018, 2019, 2020
- 2021 Goaltender of the Year
- 2021 Foundation Award (Minnesota Whitecaps representative)

Preceded by Katie Fitzgerald (2017)	Goaltender of the Year; 2018	Succeeded by Shannon Szabados (2019)
Preceded by Lovisa Selander (2020)	Goaltender of the Year; 2021	Succeeded by Elaine Chuli (2022)
