= 2010–11 CWHL season =

The 2010–11 CWHL season is the fourth in the history of the Canadian Women's Hockey League but was considered a reboot for the league after a major restructuring as an organization. For the season, the league was to run on a budget of $500,000 and players will pay for their own equipment.

As part of the restructuring, officially, all five CWHL teams in the 2010–11 season were referred to by the league as their locations without any monikers and were considered "new" teams. However, since most of the locations had teams in the previous seasons, they were still commonly referenced as their monikers. The league returned to the team name usage for the following season.

== Offseason ==
Prior to the season, the league underwent a structural reorganization. The CWHL considered the restructure a relaunch of the league. Among the changes included the Mississauga Chiefs, Ottawa Senators and Vaughan Flames teams ceasing operations, adding a new team in Toronto, and expanding into the United States with a team in Boston. The relaunch also branded the five teams after their respective locations, simply calling them Boston CWHL, Brampton CWHL, Burlington CWHL, Montreal CWHL, and Toronto CWHL. However, the CWHL teams that were playing in previous markets were commonly referred to as their former names, the Boston team called itself the Boston Blades, and the new Toronto team was sometimes called Toronto HC.

The league held its first player draft on August 12, 2010, although it was only for the three Greater Toronto Area teams as the league decided that since they do not pay a salary, it would be unfair to force players to be based outside their hometown. The event was held at the Hockey Hall of Fame in Toronto.

On September 11, the Centre Etienne Desmarteau in Montreal, Quebec, named one of the rinks in the arena in Caroline Ouellette's honour.

On September 17, former New Hampshire goaltender Erin Whitten was named head coach of the Boston expansion franchise.

== News and notes ==
- November 20–21: Montreal swept Brampton in a two-game series. The battle between the top two teams in the Canadian Women's Hockey League resulted in Montreal remaining undefeated. The November 20 game involved a pre-game salute. Montreal recognized Angela James, the head coach of Brampton for her historic induction into the Hockey Hall of Fame, and held a minute of silence for the passing of Pat Burns at the Étienne Desmarteau Arena.
- December 19: Boston came from behind to defeat Montreal. In doing so, they broke up Montreal's bid for an undefeated season. Boston goalie Mandy Cronin stopped 74 shots to lead Boston to victory. Montreal had an early 2–0 lead. In the second period, Blades' player Sam Faber scored on an assist by Jess Koizumi. In the third period, Koizumi would tie the game. With 3:24 to play in the game, Angela Ruggiero scored the game-winning goal. She was assisted by Sam Faber and Haley Moore.
- January 16: Gillian Apps scored her seventh goal of the season 2:42 into overtime as Brampton defeated Boston by a 4–3 tally. The win was the fifth in a row for Brampton and 11–6 on the season. The five game win streak was the best in the league. Brampton had yet to lose a game in 2011. In addition, they outscored their opponents 23–9 during the streak.
- January 18, 2011: Brampton competed against Montreal at the Invista Centre in Kingston, Ontario. This was team captain Jayna Hefford's hometown and her number 15 was raised to the rafters of the Invista Centre on behalf of the Kingston Area Minor Hockey Association. As of 2012, no sweaters bearing Hefford's number will be used in Kingston Minor Hockey.

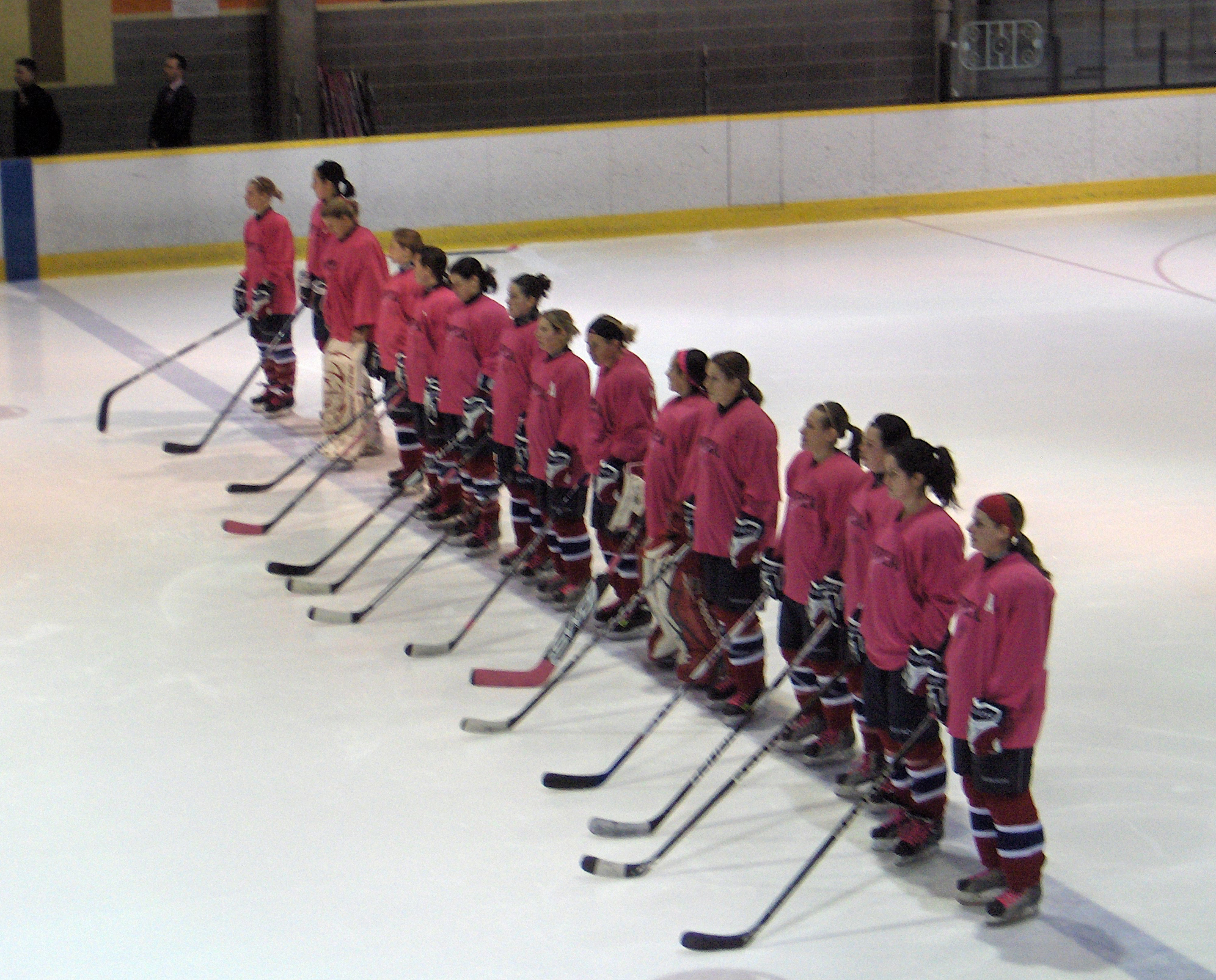
Montreal Stars played to beat breast cancer

- January 21: Georgetown, Ontario, hosted a game between Brampton and Toronto. The game featured eight former Olympians (from Brampton, Gillian Apps, Jayna Hefford, Lori Depuis, Delaney Collins and Molly Engstrom, and from Toronto, Sami Jo Small, Tessa Bonhomme and Jennifer Botterill). Brampton prevailed by a 5–2 tally.
- January 29: Montreal raised awareness and funds for the Fondation du cancer du sein du Québec (FCSQ). The game featured the Montreal club in pink at Centre Etienne Desmarteau versus Boston. Montreal prevailed by a 3–0 score (goals scored by: Stephanie Denino, Sarah Vaillancourt and Tawnya Davis). 800 persons came to support the cause.
- February 12: Brampton topped Boston for tenth straight victory, Montreal and Toronto win one game each.
- February 19: at the Mastercard Centre, Toronto faced off against Montreal for a special event for the Canadian National Institute for the Blind. There were over 500 people in attendance and many fun events for all those involved.
- February 27: For their last match of the regular season, Montreal ended up on the winning side, defeating Boston 4–1 solidifying their hold on first place in the league.

=== Team captains ===
Team	Captain	Alternates
Boston	None	None
Brampton	Jayna Hefford	Gillian Apps, Delaney Collins, Cherie Piper
Burlington	None	None
Montreal	Lisa-Marie Breton	Nathalie Dery, Caroline Ouellette
Toronto	Jennifer Botterill	Tessa Bonhomme

=== Board of directors ===
- January 25, 2011: The CWHL announced its board of directors for the upcoming season.

Member	Title
Nancy Drolet	Past Chairperson
Chris Emanuel	Chairperson, Community Director
Sami Jo Small	Vice Chairperson, Player Representative
Cassie Campbell	Treasurer, Community Director
Lori Digulla	Secretary, Community Director
Colleen Coyne	Community Director
Shannon Shakespeare	Community Director
Lisa-Marie Breton-Lebreux	Player Representative
Ted Dean	Community Director
Fran Rider	OWHA Delegate
Pat Nicholls	OWHA Delegate
Brenda Andress	Executive Director

== Final standings ==
Note: GP = Games played, W = Wins, L = Losses, OTL = Overtime Losses, SOL = Shootout Losses, GF = Goals for, GA = Goals against, Pts = Points.

CWHL Division
No.	Team	GP	W	L	OTL	SOL	Pts	GF	GA
1	Montreal	26	22	2	0	2	46	125	70
2	Brampton	26	19	5	1	1	40	111	69
3	Boston	26	10	15	1	0	21	73	101
4	Toronto	26	8	13	0	5	21	83	98
5	Burlington	26	6	18	1	1	14	54	108

== Statistics ==
=== Scoring leaders ===
Rank	Player, team	GP	Goals	Assists	Points	PIM
1	Caroline Ouellette, Montreal	26	22	46	68	14
2	Jayna Hefford, Brampton	24	24	22	46	26
3	Jennifer Botterill, Toronto	22	13	25	38	12
4	Noemie Marin, Montreal	17	21	14	35	10
5	Emmanuelle Blais, Montreal	26	11	21	32	30
5	Julie Chu, Montreal	16	5	27	32	0
7	Annie Guay, Montreal	26	13	18	31	16
8	Sam Faber, Boston	21	15	14	29	28
9	Cherie Piper, Brampton	13	13	12	25	6
9	Angela Ruggiero, Boston	20	10	15	25	36
9	Sarah Vaillancourt, Montreal	12	10	15	25	8
9	Britni Smith, Toronto	26	7	18	25	18
13	Gillian Apps, Brampton	23	10	13	23	82
13	Brooke Beazer, Brampton	23	10	13	23	16

=== Goaltending leaders ===
Rank	Player, team	GP	W	L	SO	GAA
1	Kim St-Pierre, Montreal	11	10	0	3	2.08
2	Laura Hosier, Brampton	19	12	5	3	2.98
3	Sami Jo Small, Toronto	16	5	7	2	3.13
4	Kendra Fisher, Toronto	11	3	6	0	3.63
5	Christina Kessler, Burlington	19	13	1	0	3.69
6	Mandy Cronin, Boston	18	8	9	1	3.84

=== Attendance ===
As of February 28, 2011
Team	Home games	Total	Average
Brampton	13	3424	263
Toronto	10	2197	219
Boston	16	3471	216
Montreal	14	2500	178
Burlington	10	1141	114

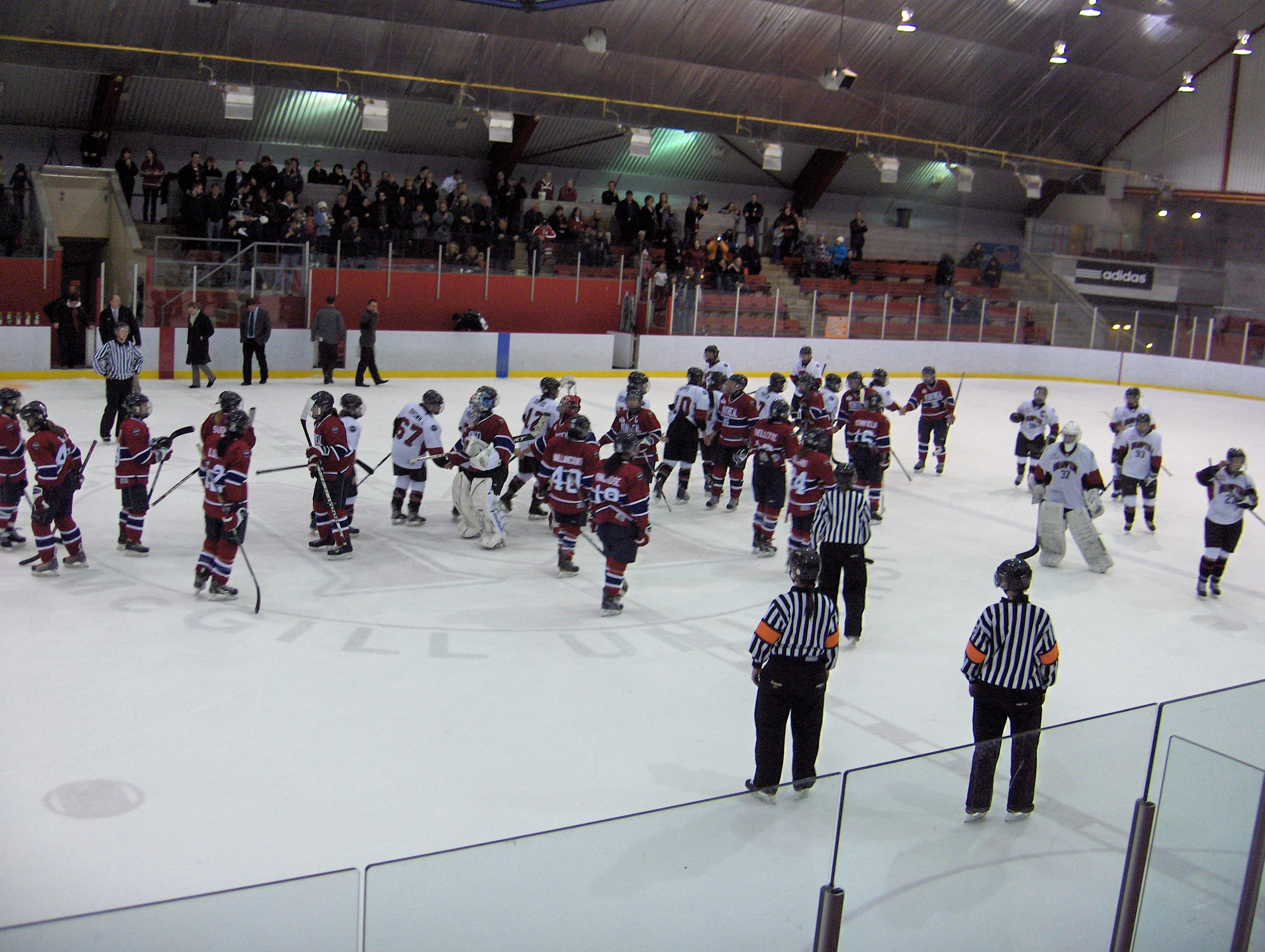
March 11 Playoff: Brampton - Montreal: 2 matches with fast rhythm

== Awards and honors ==
- Most Valuable Player: Caroline Ouellette, Montreal
- Angela James Bowl: Top Scorer Caroline Ouellette, Montreal
- Outstanding Rookie: Sarah Vaillancourt, Montreal
- Coach of the Year: Patrick Rankine, Montreal

=== CWHL Top Players ===
- Top Forward: Caroline Ouellette, Montreal
- Top Defender: Angela Ruggiero, Boston
- Top Goaltender: Kim St-Pierre, Montreal

=== CWHL All-Stars ===
First Team All-Stars

- Goaltender: Kim St-Pierre, Montreal
- Defender: Angela Ruggiero, Boston
- Defender: Annie Guay, Montreal
- Forward: Caroline Ouellette, Montreal
- Forward: Jayna Hefford, Brampton
- Forward: Sarah Vaillancourt, Montreal

Second Team All-Stars

- Goaltender: Laura Hosier, Brampton
- Defender: Britni Smith, Toronto
- Defender: Molly Engstrom, Brampton
- Forward: Jennifer Botterill, Toronto
- Forward: Sam Faber, Boston
- Forward: Noemie Marin, Montreal

=== CWHL All-Rookie Team ===
- Goaltender: Christina Kessler, Burlington
- Defender: Britni Smith, Toronto
- Defender: Kacey Bellamy, Boston
- Forward: Sarah Vaillancourt, Montreal
- Forward: Sam Faber, Boston
- Forward: Kori Cheverie, Toronto

=== CWHL Monthly Top Scorer ===
- October: Noémie Marin, Montreal
- November: Caroline Ouellette, Montreal
- December: Caroline Ouellette, Montreal
- January: Caroline Ouellette, Montreal
- February: Caroline Ouellette, Montreal

== Postseason ==
Brampton travelled to Montreal and Toronto went to Boston for the first round of the playoffs. Montreal and Toronto won each of their matches against their opponents to participate in the Clarkson Cup Championship.

Date	Score	Time	Arena	Attendance	Notes
Friday, March 11	Toronto 4, Boston 2	7:00 PM	Burbank Ice Arena	280	
Friday, March 11	Montreal 2, Brampton 1	4:30 PM	Ed Meagher Arena (Concordia University)	100	Montreal wins in shootout
Saturday, March 12	Toronto 3, Boston 1	4:00 PM	Bright Hockey Center (Harvard University)	184	Toronto wins playoff series
Saturday, March 12	Montreal 4, Brampton 3	6:00 PM	McConnell Arena (McGill University)	200	Montreal wins playoff series

== Clarkson Cup ==
The 2011 Clarkson Cup was held March 24–27, 2011. The four competing teams included three from the Canadian Women's Hockey League and the champion team of the Western Women's Hockey League, the Minnesota Whitecaps.

Date	Time	Teams	Final	Attendance
March 24	12:00 noon	Toronto vs. Brampton	Toronto 3–2	100
March 24	6:00 pm	Minnesota vs. Montreal	Montreal 5–1	240
March 25	12:00 noon	Minnesota vs. Toronto	Toronto 6–0	300
March 25	7:00 pm	Brampton vs. Montreal	Montreal 7–4	1,000
March 26	11:00 am	Minnesota vs. Brampton	Brampton 7–2	500
March 26	3:00 pm	Toronto vs. Montreal	Montreal 2–1	1,000
March 27	1:00 pm	Championship	Montreal 5–0	2,300

=== Championship game ===
March 27: The final game concluded with the Montreal team defeating Toronto 5–0. Montreal got off to a 2–0 lead in the first period with the first goal scored by Noemie Marin on a backhand shot as she converted a pass from Caroline Ouellette and the second goal scored off a face off in the Toronto end when Dominique Thibault took the draw and Vanessa Davidson put a shot behind goaltender Sami Jo Small. The lone goal of the second period was scored by Sabrina Harbec on an outside drive cutting by Annie Guay. Harbec drew the goalie across the crease and put the puck in the top corner. The shots at the end of the second period were 34 to 17 in favour of the Montreal.

Montreal added two more goals in the third period to win 5–0. At 5:33, Julie Chu passed to Caroline Ouellette and made a low shot for a goal. The final goal of the game was scored with 2:42 left as Sarah Vaillancourt picked up a pass from Ouellette and scored from about five feet out. Toronto goalie Sami Jo Small played well in defeat as Montreal controlled the game outshooting Toronto 51 to 26. Toronto did threaten offensively early in the game and could have turned the contest around but Montreal goalie, Kim St-Pierre, came up with exceptional saves to earn the shutout and ultimately crown Montreal Stars as the 2011 Clarkson Cup Champions.

Team	Games won	Games lost
Montreal	4	0
Toronto	2	2
Brampton	1	2
Minnesota	0	3

=== Awards and honors ===
Award	Winner
Top goaltender in the tournament	
Player of the Game, Winning team, Clarkson Cup Final	Dominique Thibault
Player of the Game, Losing team, Clarkson Cup Final	Jennifer Botterill
Tournament Most Valuable Player	Sarah Vaillancourt
Top forward in the tournament	
Top defender in the tournament	

== See also ==
- 2010–11 Boston Blades season
- 2010–11 Montreal Stars season
- 2011 Clarkson Cup

== External news story ==
- Cassie Campbell-Pascall, 2010 helped grow women's hockey on CBC Sports, February 9, 2011.
- Montreal hopes Clarkson Cup win promotes women's hockey league in Globe and Mail, March 27, 2011
