= 2011–12 CWHL season =

5th CWHL season

The 2011–12 CWHL season was the fifth in league history. Regular season play begun on October 22, 2011, as the defending champion Montreal Stars hosted the Brampton Thunder. The league expanded from five teams to six as Team Alberta (CWHL) joined the league for competitive play. The 2012 Clarkson Cup in Niagara Falls was also contested between the Stars and Thunder, with Montreal winning its second consecutive title.

== Offseason ==
=== News and notes ===
- April 19: The league announced on April 19, 2011, that it would merge with the Western Women's Hockey League for the 2011-12 season. The merger featured one team based in Edmonton and Calgary and was a combination of the former WWHL franchises the Edmonton Chimos and Strathmore Rockies. The team would play their games in various locations around Alberta. Strathmore Rockies founder Samantha Holmes-Domagala, joined the sponsorship division of the CWHL to look after the requirements of the expansion team.
- July 21, 2011: Philanthropist Joan Snyder donated $2 million to Winsport Canada. The goal was to ensure priority rink access to female hockey players at all levels, and to help expand the Canadian Women's Hockey League with the creation of Team Alberta. Part of the donation would cover the new addition to the Athletic and Ice Complex at Canada Olympic Park in Calgary. This would serve as the future home to Hockey Canada. In addition, there would be four hockey rinks, one of which would aptly be named the Joan Snyder Rink. Team Alberta would benefit with the allocation of free practice time, and a dressing room exclusive to the club.

== CWHL Draft ==
The following are the first ten overall picks in the CWHL Draft. For further detail, please see 2011 CWHL Draft

Pick	Player	Team
1	Meghan Agosta	Montreal Stars
2	Molly Schaus	Boston Blades
3	Meaghan Mikkelson	Team Alberta (CWHL)
4	Vicki Bendus	Brampton Thunder
5	Jesse Scanzano	Toronto CWHL
6	Courtney Birchard	Brampton Thunder
7	Catherine Ward	Montreal Stars
8	Meghan Duggan	Boston Blades
9	Bobbi-Jo Slusar	Team Alberta
10	Sommer West	Burlington Barracudas

== NCAA exhibition ==
Date	CWHL team	NCAA school	Score	CWHL goal scorers
Oct. 25, 2011	Brampton Thunder	Cornell Big Red women's ice hockey	Cornell, 6-0	None
Nov. 2, 2011	Brampton Thunder	Mercyhurst Lakers women's ice hockey	Brampton, 3-1	Jayna Hefford, Jesse Scanzano, Vicki Bendus

- On November 2, 2011, Scanzano was on loan from the Toronto Furies, as she appeared in one game for the Brampton Thunder. The game was an exhibition contest versus her alma mater, the Mercyhurst Lakers. In the second period of said contest, Scanzano scored the game-winning goal as the Thunder defeated the Lakers by a 3-1 tally.

== Regular season ==
=== News and notes ===
- October 13, 2011: The CWHL participated in two charity hockey games for cancer research at Windsor Arena. The event was called 'Stick It To Cancer' and the Montreal Stars competed versus the Toronto Furies in two games on Nov. 26 and 27. The campaign was organized in partnership by the CWHL, along with Breast Ride Ever, a not-for-profit organization. Proceeds from the games benefitted local cancer programs and the Hospice of Windsor and Essex County.
- On November 18, 2011, several Burlington Barracudas players (including Christina Kessler, Shannon Moulson, Ashley Stephenson, Jana Harrigan, Amanda Shaw, Annina Rajahuhta, Samantha Shirley, Amanda Parkins, and Lindsay Vine) competed in the first ever Hockey Helps the Homeless Women's Tournament, held at the Magna Centre in Newmarket, Ontario.
- On November 19, at Montreal, the second annual "Game on to beat breast cancer" benefit. The target to surpass the previous year's donation results was far exceeded. A new attendance record was also set at the game, with over 1,100 fans in the stands.
- On December 8, Montréal Stars offered a cheque for close to $15,000 to the Quebec Breast Cancer Foundation
- Barracudas players Christina Kessler and Shannon Moulson were part of an event at Power Play Sports in Niagara Falls, Ontario on December 20, 2011 to promote the 2012 Clarkson Cup (to be held in Niagara Falls). After the event, they met players from the NFGHA (Niagara Falls Girls Hockey League) for photographs and autographs.

=== Season standings ===
Note: GP = Games played, W = Wins, L = Losses, T = Ties, OTL = Overtime losses, GF = Goals for, GA = Goals against, Pts = Points.

Regular season
No.	Team	GP	W	L	OTL	GF	GA	Pts
1	Montreal Stars	27	22	4	1	160	66	51
2	Boston Blades	27	20	7	0	107	61	46
3	Brampton Thunder	27	18	7	2	102	80	40
4	Toronto Furies	27	9	13	5	75	105	26
5	Alberta CWHL	15	5	10	0	38	66	20
6	Burlington Barracudas	27	1	26	0	46	150	2

Team Alberta CWHL played only half of the number of regular matches. This was because of the geographical estrangement. Points were consequently adjusted with another teams.

== League leaders ==
=== Scoring leaders ===
Players	TEAM	GP	G	A	PTS	PIM
Meghan Agosta	Montreal Stars	27	41	39	80	16
Caroline Ouellette	Montreal Stars	27	30	36	66	12
Vanessa Davidson	Montreal Stars	27	24	25	49	26
Kelli Stack	Boston Blades	27	24	17	41	16
Gillian Apps	Brampton Thunder	27	19	20	39	70
Noemie Marin	Montreal Stars	24	12	22	34	16
Cherie Piper	Brampton Thunder	25	12	21	33	10
Erika Lawler	Boston Blades	26	11	22	33	10
Gigi Marvin	Boston Blades	27	11	21	32	24
Catherine Ward	Montreal Stars	27	2	29	31	28
Vicki Bendus	Brampton Thunder	27	15	14	29	18
Sarah Vaillancourt	Montreal Stars	14	10	18	28	30
Emmanuelle Blais	Montreal Stars	21	10	17	27	24
Molly Engstrom	Brampton Thunder	27	4	23	27	22
Sabrina Harbec	Montreal Stars	17	8	16	24	2

=== Goaltending leaders ===
Player	TEAM	GP	MIN	W	L	OTL	GA	SO	GAA
Molly Schaus	Boston Blade	23	1386:05	16	7	0	0	0	2.38
Jenny Lavigne	Montreal Stars	23	1358:13	19	4	0	0	2	2.39
Liz Knox	Brampton Thunder	20	1206:06	13	6	1	0	1	2.94
Erika Vanderveer	Toronto Furies	9	525:00	2	5	1	1	0	2.97
Lundy Day	Team Alberta CWHL	10	603:33	4	6	0	0	0	3.98
Sami Jo Small	Toronto Furies	16	933:13	5	7	2	2	1	4.11
Christina Kessler	Burlington Barracudas	11	634:44	1	10	0	0	0	5.10
Mandy Cronin	Burlington Barracudas	13	675:12	0	11	0	0	0	5.86

== Awards and honours ==
The 2012 CWHL Awards Banquet was held on Mar. 21, 2012 in Niagara Falls, ON (during the Clarkson Cup weekend). That night, the league formally recognized the Angela James Bowl winner, the Most Valuable Player, the Goaltender of the Year, the Rookie of the Year, and the Coach of the Year.

- Most Valuable Player: Meghan Agosta, Montreal
- Angela James Bowl: Top Scorer Meghan Agosta, Montreal
- Outstanding Rookie: Courtney Birchard, Brampton
- Coach of the Year: Lauren McAuliffe, Boston

=== CWHL Top Players ===
- Top Forward: Meghan Agosta, Montreal
- Top Defender: Catherine Ward, Montreal
- Top Goaltender: Molly Schaus, Boston

=== CWHL All-Stars ===
First Team All-Stars

- Goaltender: Molly Schaus, Boston
- Defender: Catherine Ward, Montreal
- Defender: Molly Engstrom, Brampton
- Forward: Meghan Agosta, Montreal
- Forward: Caroline Ouellette, Montreal
- Forward: Kelli Stack, Boston

Second Team All-Stars

- Goaltender: Jenny Lavigne, Montreal
- Defender: Gigi Marvin, Boston
- Defender: Tessa Bonhomme, Toronto
- Forward: Gillian Apps, Brampton
- Forward: Jayna Hefford, Brampton
- Forward: Vanessa Davidson, Montreal

=== CWHL All-Rookie Team ===
- Goaltender: Molly Schaus, Boston
- Defender: Catherine Ward, Montreal
- Defender: Courtney Birchard, Brampton
- Forward: Meghan Agosta, Montreal
- Forward: Kelli Stack, Boston
- Forward: Erika Lawler, Boston

=== CWHL Monthly Top Scorer ===
- October: Kelli Stack, Boston
- November: Caroline Ouellette, Montreal
- December: Meghan Agosta, Montreal
- January: Meghan Agosta, Montreal
- February: Meghan Agosta, Montreal
- March: Gillian Apps, Brampton

== Postseason ==
The postseason was held at the Gale Centre in Niagara Falls, Ontario. All teams played in a round robin to determine the contestants in the Clarkson Cup finals.

Date	Away	Home	Score
March 22	Toronto	Montreal	Montreal, 7-0
March 22	Brampton	Boston	Brampton, 3-2
March 23	Toronto	Boston	Boston, 5-2
March 23	Brampton	Montreal	Montreal, 2-0
March 24	Toronto	Brampton	Brampton, 4-2
March 24	Boston	Montreal	Montreal, 5-4 (OT)

Team	W	L	OTL	GF	GA
Montreal	3	0	0	14	4
Brampton	2	1	0	7	6
Boston	1	1	1	11	10
Toronto	0	3	0	4	16

=== Clarkson Cup ===
Date	Location	Final score	Attendance
25 March	Gale Centre – Niagara Falls, ON	Montreal Stars 4-2 Brampton Thunder	5,000
