= 2007–08 Brampton Thunder season =

== Regular season ==
=== Season standings ===
Central Division
No.	Team	GP	W	L	T	GF	GA	Pts
1	Brampton Thunder	30	22	7	1	111	59	45
2	Mississauga Chiefs	30	21	8	1	115	61	43
3	Vaughan Flames	30	12	16	2	69	101	26
4	Burlington Barracudas	30	11	18	1	76	98	23

=== Roster ===
Number	Player	Age
16	Jayna Hefford	30
61	Vicky Sunohara	37
12	Lori Dupuis	35
17	Tiffany Hagge	23
10	Gillian Apps	24
9	Molly Engstrom	24
18	Kathleen Kauth	28
6	Krista McArthur	24
23	Meredith Ostrander	28
20	Allyson Fox	32
8	Lori Loftus	30
11	Bobbi Jo Slusar	22
27	Cathy Hambly	
7	Sue McCutcheon	
24	Elysia Desmier	
14	Mandy Love	
24	Belinda O'Dell	
29	Alison Scott	19
35	Stewart, Amanda	
	Kelsey Webster	21
35	Cindy Eadie	25
1	Mandy Cronin	27

== Player stats ==
Name	Games Played	Goals	Assists	Points	Penalty Minutes
Hefford, Jayna	27	26	32	58	56
Sunohara, Vicky	28	13	25	38	22
Dupuis, Lori	25	17	12	29	18
Hagge, Tiffany	30	12	15	27	36
Apps, Gillian	25	10	13	23	87
Engstrom, Molly	28	9	11	20	32
Kauth, Kathleen	26	9	8	17	10
McArthur, Krista	28	2	13	15	36
Ostrander, Meredith	28	4	10	14	54
Fox, Allyson	30	2	9	11	18
Loftus, Lori	28	0	10	10	38
Slusar, Bobbi Jo	11	2	5	7	0
Hambly, Cathy	26	3	2	5	6
McCutcheon, Sue	26	1	2	3	22
Desmier, Elysia	4	0	1	1	0
Love, Mandy	1	0	1	1	0
O'Dell, Belinda	1	0	1	1	0
Scott, Alison	0	0	0	0	0
Stewart, Amanda	0	0	0	0	0
Webster, Kelsey	2	0	0	0	0
Eadie, Cindy	14	0	0	0	0
Cronin, Mandy	18	0	0	0	0

== Awards and honors ==
- Lori Dupuis, Most Valuable Player, Playoffs
- Cindy Eadie, Central Division All-Star Team selection
- Molly Engstrom, Central Division All-Star Team selection
- Molly Engstrom, CWHL All-Rookie Team
- Jayna Hefford, Central Division All-Star Team selection
- Jayna Hefford, League Leader, Goals Scored (26)
- Jayna Hefford, Brampton, Most Valuable Player, Regular season
- Bobbi Jo Slusar, CWHL All-Rookie Team

== See also ==
- 2007–08 CWHL season
- Brampton Thunder
- Canadian Women's Hockey League
