= 2005 Abby Hoffman Cup =

Canadian ice hockey championship trophy

Tournament details
- Venue: Sarnia Sports Centre
- Dates: March 9–13, 2005
- Teams: 10

Final positions
- Champions: Toronto Aeros (5th title)
- Runners-up: Brampton Thunder
- Third place: Axion de Montréal

Tournament statistics
- Games played: 29

Awards
- MVP: Cheryl Pounder (Toronto)

The 2005 Abby Hoffman Cup was the 24th staging of Hockey Canada's Esso Women's National Championships. The five-day competition was played in Sarnia, Ontario. The Toronto Aeros won the Abby Hoffman Cup for the fifth time, this time with a 2–1 win over the Brampton Thunder.

In the final game, Toronto's Jennifer Botterill scored the winner in the third period.

== Teams participating ==
- Hockey BC
- Team Alberta, Alberta
- Team Manitoba
- Toronto Aeros, Ontario
- Brampton Thunder, Ontario
- Axion de Montréal
- Team New Brunswick
- Team Prince Edward Island
- Team Nova Scotia
- Team Newfoundland & Labrador

== Final round ==
=== Gold medal game ===
March 13, 2005; 15:00	(gold) Toronto	2-1	Brampton (silver)	Attendance: 2990

Game reference
			Referee: Stephanie Normand
Heather Logan, Jennifer Botterill / Goals / Vicky Sunohara			Referee: Stephanie Normand
22	Shots	21	Referee: Stephanie Normand
