= 2007–08 CWHL season =

The 2007–08 CWHL season was the first season in Canadian Women's Hockey League history. Jayna Hefford was named CWHL Most Valuable Player and a CWHL Central All-Star. She led the league with 26 goals scored in 27 games played. Jayna Hefford was voted the league's regular-season Most Valuable Player. Jennifer Botterill won the Angela James Bowl after winning the league scoring title with 61 points and was voted the CWHL Top Forward. Becky Kellar was voted the CWHL Top Defender, Kim St-Pierre was voted the CWHL Top Goaltender, and Marie-Philip Poulin was voted the CWHL Outstanding Rookie.

== Final standings ==
Note: GP = Games played, W = Wins, L = Losses, OTL = Overtime Losses, SOL = Shootout Losses, GF = Goals for, GA = Goals against, Pts = Points.

CWHL Division
No.	Team	GP	W	L	OTL	SOL	Pts	GF	GA
1	Brampton Thunder	30	22	7	0	1	45	111	59
2	Mississauga Chiefs	30	21	8	0	1	43	115	61
3	Vaughan Flames	30	12	16	2	0	26	69	101
4	Burlington Barracudas	30	11	18	0	1	23	76	98

Eastern Division
No.	Team	GP	W	L	OTL	SOL	Pts	GF	GA
1	Montreal Stars	30	23	6	1	0	47	115	55
2	Ottawa Capital Canucks	30	8	19	0	3	19	58	104
3	Quebec Phenix	30	8	21	0	1	17	56	122

== Playoffs ==
=== First round ===
- Burlington 2, Ottawa 1
- Mississauga 6, Vaughan 2

=== Second round ===
- Mississauga 4, Montreal 3
  - Mississauga 4, Montreal 4
- Brampton 5, Burlington 2
  - Brampton 3, Burlington 3

=== CWHL championship ===
- The Brampton Thunder won the first Championship of the CWHL. Molly Engstrom scored the game-winning goal as the Thunder beat the Mississauga Chiefs by a score of 4–3 in overtime. Lori Dupuis won the Championship Game MVP honours.

== Player stats ==
=== Scoring leaders ===
Player	Team	Goals	Assists	Points
Jennifer Botterill	Mississauga	24	37	61
Jayna Hefford	Brampton	26	32	58
Sommer West	Mississauga	23	25	48
Marie-Philip Poulin	Montreal	22	21	43
Vicky Sunohara	Brampton	13	25	38
Jana Harrigan	Burlington	18	17	35
Leslie Oles	Montreal	16	16	32
Caroline Laforge	Montreal	12	20	32
Lisa-Marie Breton	Montreal	11	21	32
Lori Dupuis	Brampton	17	12	29

== Awards and honours ==
- Most Valuable Player: Jayna Hefford, Brampton
- Angela James Bowl: Top Scorer Jennifer Botterill, Mississauga
- Outstanding Rookie: Marie-Philip Poulin, Montreal
- Championship Game MVP: Lori Dupuis, Brampton

=== CWHL Top Players ===
- Top Forward: Jayna Hefford, Brampton
- Top Defender: Becky Kellar, Burlington
- Top Goaltender: Kim St-Pierre, Montreal

=== CWHL All-Stars ===
Central All-Stars

- Goaltender: Cindy Eadie, Brampton
- Defender: Becky Kellar, Burlington
- Defender: Molly Engstrom, Brampton
- Forward: Jayna Hefford, Brampton
- Forward: Jennifer Botterill, Mississauga
- Forward: Jana Harrigan, Burlington

Eastern All-Stars

- Goaltender: Kim St-Pierre, Montreal (unanimous selection)
- Defender: Nathalie Déry, Montreal
- Defender: Lyne Landry, Ottawa
- Forward: Marie-Philip Poulin, Montreal (unanimous selection)
- Forward: Leslie Oles, Montreal
- Forward: Katie Weatherston, Ottawa/Montreal

=== CWHL All-Rookie Team ===
- Goaltender: Christine Dufour, Quebec
- Defender: Molly Engstrom, Brampton
- Defender: Bobbi-Jo Slusar, Brampton
- Forward: Marie-Philip Poulin, Montreal
- Forward: Leslie Oles, Montreal
- Forward: Katie Weatherston, Ottawa/Montreal

=== Monthly Top Scorers ===
- September: Jayna Hefford, Brampton (3+8=11 points, 3 games)
- October: Marie-Philip Poulin, Montreal (12+7=19 points, 7 games)
- November: Jana Harrigan, Burlington (5+3=8 points, 5 games)
- December: Jayna Hefford, Brampton (8+9=17 points, 7 games)
- January: Jayna Hefford, Brampton (7+10=17 points, 7 games)
- February: Jennifer Botterill, Mississauga (8+10=18 points, 6 games)

== See also ==
- Canadian Women's Hockey League
- 2007–08 Brampton Thunder season
