= Brenda Andress =

Canadian ice hockey player

Commissioner of the Canadian Women's Hockey League
- In office 2008 – July 31, 2018
- Preceded by: Incumbent
- Succeeded by: Jayna Hefford

President and Founder of SheIS
- In office February 7, 2018 - present

Personal details
- Born: Brenda Andress
- Children: 2

Brenda Andress was the first Commissioner for the Canadian Women's Hockey League, serving in the position from 2008/09 to 2017/18.

== Professional career ==
Andress was a former director of recreation for the Town of Newmarket, Ontario. She was also a former Level 6 certified referee. She served as a referee and linesman in the National Women's Hockey League and Canadian Women's Hockey League.

=== Commissioner of CWHL ===
Among her roles as Commissioner, she was involved in the first CWHL Draft, held in 2010, which saw the Toronto Furies draft Tessa Bonhomme with the first pick overall. Under her authority, the decade would see the league develop club-to-club partnerships with different NHL teams, including the Calgary Flames, Montreal Canadiens and Toronto Maple Leafs. The partnership with the Maple Leafs would also include the use of the Air Canada Centre for three different All-Star Game events.

A Canadian broadcast deal with Rogers Sportsnet provided a national television audience for the All-Star Game plus the Clarkson Cup finals. Although the league expanded to Boston and China during Andress' tenure, there was also contraction. During the 2010s, contracted teams included the Burlington Barracudas, Ottawa Lady Senators, Vaughan Flames, plus the Vanke Rays, who played only one season. On July 18, 2018, Andress tendered her resignation, formally leaving on July 31, 2018. Following the day of her resignation, Jayna Hefford was appointed to the position of interim commissioner.

==== Final season ====
During her final season as CWHL Commissioner, Andress oversaw the compensation of its players. While the league has been dedicated to paying staff and player travel costs, the 2017-18 campaign marked the first compensation for players, with salaries ranging from $2,000 to $10,000, with a team salary cap of $100,000.

Leading into said season, Andress welcomed expansion teams from China. The first team, the Kunlun Red Star, were formally introduced on June 5, 2017, with an announcement at the Hockey Hall of Fame.

Preceded by Inaugural	CWHL Commissioner (2007–2018)	Succeeded by Jayna Hefford
