= Quebec Phenix =

- City: Montreal, Quebec
- League: Canadian Women's Hockey League
- Division: Eastern
- Founded: 2007
- Folded: 2008
- Colours: Black, yellow & white
- Head coach: Christian Lefebvre

The Quebec Phenix (French: Phénix du Québec) was a professional women's ice hockey team in the Canadian Women's Hockey League (CWHL). The team played its home games in Montreal. The team had a wide range of young talent, some from Université Laval, high schools, and others. Former head coach Christian Lefebvre said in a radio interview that the team typically drew crowds of only about 50 supporters and that sponsors were hard to find. The team closed in 2008 after just one season in CWHL.

== Records ==
Year	GP	W	L	T	GF	GA	Pts	Standing	Playoffs
2007–08	30	8	21	1	54	120	17	3rd, Eastern Division	Did not qualify

Note: GP = Games played, W = Wins, L = Losses, T = Ties, GF = Goals for, GA = Goals against, Pts = Points.

=== Team records ===
Losing streak: 15 games from 29 September 2007 to 5 January 2008.

== 2007–08 roster ==
Goalies
Number		Player	GP	MIN	W	L	GAA	GA	EN	ShO
36	(Canada)	Marie-Andree Joncas	22	1025	3	15	4.57	78	0	0
35	(Canada)	Jessica Anderson	3	100	0	0	6.00	10	0	0
34	(Canada)	Christine Dufour	13	614	5	6	3.13	32	0	1

Defense and Forward
Number		Player	Age	GP	Goal	Assist	Pts	Pen
79	(Canada)	Stacie Tardif	18	6	0	1	1	0
77	(Canada)	Marie-Helene Desrosiers	24	6	0	0	0	8
77	(Canada)	Audrey Cournoyer	17	3	1	1	2	0
77	(Canada)	Juana Baribeau	18	4	2	0	2	0
77	(Canada)	Laurie Tremblay	21	1	0	0	0	2
71	(Canada)	Cinthia Charbonneau	22	29	11	9	20	72
66	(Canada)	Marie-Eve Cloutier	26	24	1	5	6	24
55	(Canada)	Caroline Levesque	25	27	8	3	11	79
34	(Canada)	Sylvia Marsolais	29	1	0	0	0	0
22	(Canada)	Audrey Sequin	22	27	1	2	3	38
21	(Canada)	Veronique Lapierre	26	29	5	8	13	46
19	(Canada)	Nancy Cousineau	21	29	3	4	7	40
18	(Canada)	Sharel Bourbeau	20	27	0	1	1	36
17	(Canada)	Mirjam Ludwig	19	8	0	0	0	4
16	(Canada)	Marie-Eve Pharand	21	28	7	14	21	18
15	(Canada)	Alexia Laplante	N/A	2	1	1	2	12
12	(Canada)	Julia Carlton	26	2	0	0	0	0
12	(Canada)	Genevieve David	19	27	2	4	6	44
11	(Canada)	Martine Leduc	20	1	0	0	0	4
11	(Canada)	Genevieve Dupuis	26	21	2	6	8	35
10	(Canada)	Suzanne Kaye	28	3	0	0	0	4
8	(Canada)	Marie-Michelle Poirier	20	5	2	3	5	6
7	(Canada)	Marie-Claude Allard	28	4	0	2	2	4
4	(Canada)	Lysiane Desilets	23	28	4	6	10	8

== Award and honour ==
- CWHL All-Rookie Team: Goalie: Christine Dufour
- 6 January 2008 : Christine Dufour makes 51 saves as Phénix ends 15-game losing skid.
