= 2000–01 Harvard Crimson women's ice hockey season =

- Conference: ECAC
- Home ice: Bright Hockey Center

Record

Coaches and captains
- Head coach: Katey Stone

The 2000–01 Harvard Crimson women's ice hockey team represented Harvard University. During the 2000-01 season, Tammy Lee Shewchuk led the NCAA in assists per game with 1.48.

== Player stats ==
Note: GP= Games played; G= Goals; A= Assists; PTS = Points; GW = Game Winning Goals; PPL = Power Play Goals; SHG = Short Handed Goals

Player	GP	G	A	Pts	GW	PPL	SHG
Jennifer Botterill	30	42	36	78	7	8	2
Tammy Shewchuk	31	29	46	75	4	8	2
Kalen Ingram	34	21	25	46	3	1	2
Angie Francisco	24	9	24	33	2	4	0
Kiirsten Suurkask	34	12	16	28	2	0	2
Tara Dunn	30	5	16	21	2	2	1
Pamela Van Reesema	34	3	17	20	0	2	0
Jamie Hagerman	34	2	15	17	0	2	0
Tracy Catlin	34	10	6	16	2	0	0
Lauren McAuliffe	34	4	5	9	1	0	1
Jamie Notman	34	1	8	9	1	0	0
Mina Pell	30	3	0	3	0	0	0
Vanessa Bazzocchi	34	2	1	3	0	0	0
Julie Rando	34	1	0	1	0	0	0
Alison Kuusisto	10	0	1	1	0	0	0
Jessica Ruddock	26	0	0	0	0	0	0
Emily Smith	3	0	0	0	0	0	0

== Awards and honors ==
- Jennifer Botterill, Patty Kazmaier Award
- Tammy Lee Shewchuk, 2001 ECAC All-Tournament team
- Katey Stone repeated as the New England Hockey Writers Coach of the Year for the 2000-01 season.
