= 2012 Clarkson Cup =

2012 ice hockey championship series

| | 1 | Total |
|---|---|---|
| Montreal Stars | 4 | 4 |
| Brampton Thunder | 2 | 2 |
- Location(s): Niagara Falls, Ontario
- Dates: March 25, 2012
- Hall of Famers: Stars: Caroline Ouellette (2023); Kim St-Pierre (2020); Thunder: Jayna Hefford (2018)

The 2012 Clarkson Cup was a women's ice hockey tournament contested in Niagara Falls, Ontario to determine the champion of the Canadian Women's Hockey League from March 22, 2012 to March 25, 2012. The Montreal Stars defeated the Brampton Thunder by a 4-2 tally to claim their third title in four years. Over 5,000 spectators attended the games at the Gale Centre.

== Promotion ==
Burlington Barracudas players Christina Kessler and Shannon Moulson were part of an event at Power Play Sports in Niagara Falls, Ontario on December 20, 2011, to promote the 2012 Clarkson Cup (to be held in Niagara Falls). After the event, they met players from the NFGHA (Niagara Falls Girls Hockey League) for photographs and autographs.

== Round robin ==
| Date | Away | Home | Score |
| March 22 | Toronto | Montreal | Montreal, 7-0 |
| March 22 | Brampton | Boston | Brampton, 3-2 |
| March 23 | Toronto | Boston | Boston, 5-2 |
| March 23 | Brampton | Montreal | Montreal, 2-0 |
| March 24 | Toronto | Brampton | Brampton, 4-2 |
| March 24 | Boston | Montreal | Montreal, 5-4 (OT) |

| Team | W | L | OTL | GF | GA |
| Montreal | 3 | 0 | 0 | 14 | 4 |
| Brampton | 2 | 1 | 0 | 7 | 6 |
| Boston | 1 | 1 | 1 | 11 | 10 |
| Toronto | 0 | 3 | 0 | 4 | 16 |

== Championship game ==
- March 25: At 12:18 of the second period, Vanessa Davidson scored on Brampton Thunder goalie Liz Knox to give the Stars a 3-2 lead. The goal was assisted by Catherine Ward and Emmanuelle Blais, and stood as the game-winning goal.
- With the Clarkson Cup victory, Meghan Agosta became an unofficial member of the Triple Gold Club (the accomplishment by women is not yet officially recognized by the IIHF), as she became one of only five women to win the Clarkson Cup, a gold medal in Winter Olympics, and a gold medal at the IIHF World Women's Championships. The other women include Caroline Ouellette, Jenny Potter, Kim St. Pierre, and Sarah Vaillancourt.

== Awards and honours ==
- Caroline Ouellette, Montreal Stars, MVP of the tournament
- Erika Lawler, Boston Blades, Outstanding Forward
- Molly Engstrom, Brampton Thunder, Outstanding Defence
- Liz Knox, Brampton Thunder, Outstanding Goalkeeper

== See also ==
- 2013 Clarkson Cup
