= 2002–03 Harvard Crimson women's ice hockey season =

Beanpot Champions NCAA Women's Ice Hockey Frozen Four, Runner-up

Record
- Overall: 30-3-1

Coaches and captains
- Head coach: Katey Stone
- Captain: Jennifer Botterill

The 2002–03 Harvard Crimson women’s ice hockey team played in the NCAA championship game, Harvard was first in the National Polls for 14 consecutive weeks. In addition, the Crimson had a 28-game unbeaten streak and captured the ECAC regular-season and Ivy League titles. The Crimson won the Beanpot for the fifth straight season. Jennifer Botterill set an NCAA record (since tied) for most points in one game with 10. This was accomplished on January 28, 2003 versus Boston College.

== Regular season ==
On January 18, 2003, Harvard beat Boston College by a 17-2 mark, the largest margin of victory in NCAA history.

=== Beanpot ===
- February 4, 2003
  - Harvard 7, Boston University 0
- February 11, 2003
  - Harvard 7, Boston College 0
  - Jennifer Botterill claimed her third Beanpot Most Valuable Player award.

== Player stats ==
=== Skaters ===
Player	Games Played	Goals	Assists	Points
Jennifer Botterill	32	47	65	112
Julie Chu	32	42	51	93
Angela Ruggiero	34	29	54	83

=== Goaltenders ===
Player	Games Played	Minutes	Goals Against	Wins	Losses	Ties	Shutouts	Save %	Goals Against Average
Ali Boe									
Jessica Ruddock									
Emily Smith									

== Postseason ==
The Crimson won the Frozen Four semifinal by defeating the Minnesota Golden Gophers by a 6-1 score. In the final, the Crimson took the Minnesota Duluth Bulldogs to double overtime. The Crimson would lose the game by a 4-3 score.

- Harvard 6, Minnesota 1
- Minnesota-Duluth 4, Harvard 3 (OT)

== Awards and honors ==
- Jennifer Botterill, AHCA First Team All-American
- Jennifer Botterill, Beanpot Most Valuable Player
- Jennifer Botterill, Patty Kazmaier Award Winner
- Jennifer Botterill, NCAA leader, 2002-03 season, Assists per game, 2.03
- Julie Chu, AHCA Second Team All-American
- Julie Chu, NCAA Frozen Four All-Tournament Team

- Jessica Ruddock, NCAA leader, 2002-03 season, Goalie winning percentage, .883
- Angela Ruggiero, AHCA First Team All-American
- Angela Ruggiero, NCAA Frozen Four All-Tournament Team
