= Nate Oliver (ice hockey) =

American ice hockey executive

- Born: Nathaniel A. Oliver; April 13, 1980 (age 46); Buffalo, New York, U.S.
- Education: Canisius College
- Occupations: Ice hockey executive, sports journalist
- Years active: 2019–present
- Employer: Buffalo Beauts

Nathaniel "Nate" Oliver (born April 13, 1980) is an American ice hockey executive. Of note, he served as the final general manager of the Buffalo Beauts, competing in the Premier Hockey Federation (PHF). As a side note, the Beauts final season occurred in the 2022–23 PHF season, also the last for the league. Prior to his role as the Beauts general manager, Oliver served as the Beauts’ Community Relations Manager for one season. Oliver is also an associate director with Campus Living at the University at Buffalo. Before joining the Buffalo Beauts in 2019, Oliver was a sports journalist, having covered the game for The Hockey Writers.

== Hockey career ==
=== Buffalo Beauts ===
Oliver was hired as general manager the Buffalo Beauts on May 12, 2020, becoming the fourth GM in franchise history. He replaced Mandy Cronin, who left the position to become GM of the expansion Toronto Six.

The first player signed by Oliver was Dominique Kremer. In May 2022, he re-signed Kremer to the first two-year deal in league history. Six days later, on May 9, 2022, he signed Mikyla Grant-Mentis, the reigning league MVP, to the largest single-season contract in league history, valued at US$80,000.

Other players signed by Oliver while serving as Beauts GM include Autumn MacDougall, an alum of the Alberta Pandas women's ice hockey program, also the first player from U Sports women's ice hockey to be drafted into the PHF.

In Oliver's first draft as general manager, in 2021, the players he selected included RMU Colonials alumnae Emilie Harley (2nd overall) and Anjelica Diffendal (7th overall). With three consecutive picks at 13, 14 and 15, Oliver took Kennedy Ganser, Anna Zíková and Missy Segall. Holy Cross forward Allison Attea went 19th overall, while Oliver's last pick made draft history. Selecting Castleton University's Casey Traill, the first player in university history to be drafted into professional hockey, she was the first-ever British player in the draft. Additionally, Oliver selected Swedish goaltender Lovisa Berndtsson with the first ever selection in the PHF's International Draft.

== Post-hockey career ==
Having made a transition to acting, Oliver took on a role as an associate producer in 2024 for the film CATnip, a horror/comedy Christmas movie about residents of an apartment building trapped with feral cats. Scheduled for release in 2025, the cast includes the likes of Chevy Chase, Bruce Dern and Joey Lauren Adams. Oliver is also poised to appear in the film as a paramedic.

== Personal life ==
Oliver graduated from Canisius College. In addition, he also attended Williamsville South High School.

Of note, he considers his closest friend in hockey to be Finnish Olympian and HPK team manager Maija Hassinen-Sullanmaa and he credits her as one of the main influences in his becoming a professional women's hockey GM.

== Other ==
- Nathaniel Oliver's IMDB Page

Preceded by Mandy Cronin	General Manager of the Buffalo Beauts; 2020–present	Succeeded by
