= Annina Rajahuhta =

Finnish ice hockey player and broadcaster

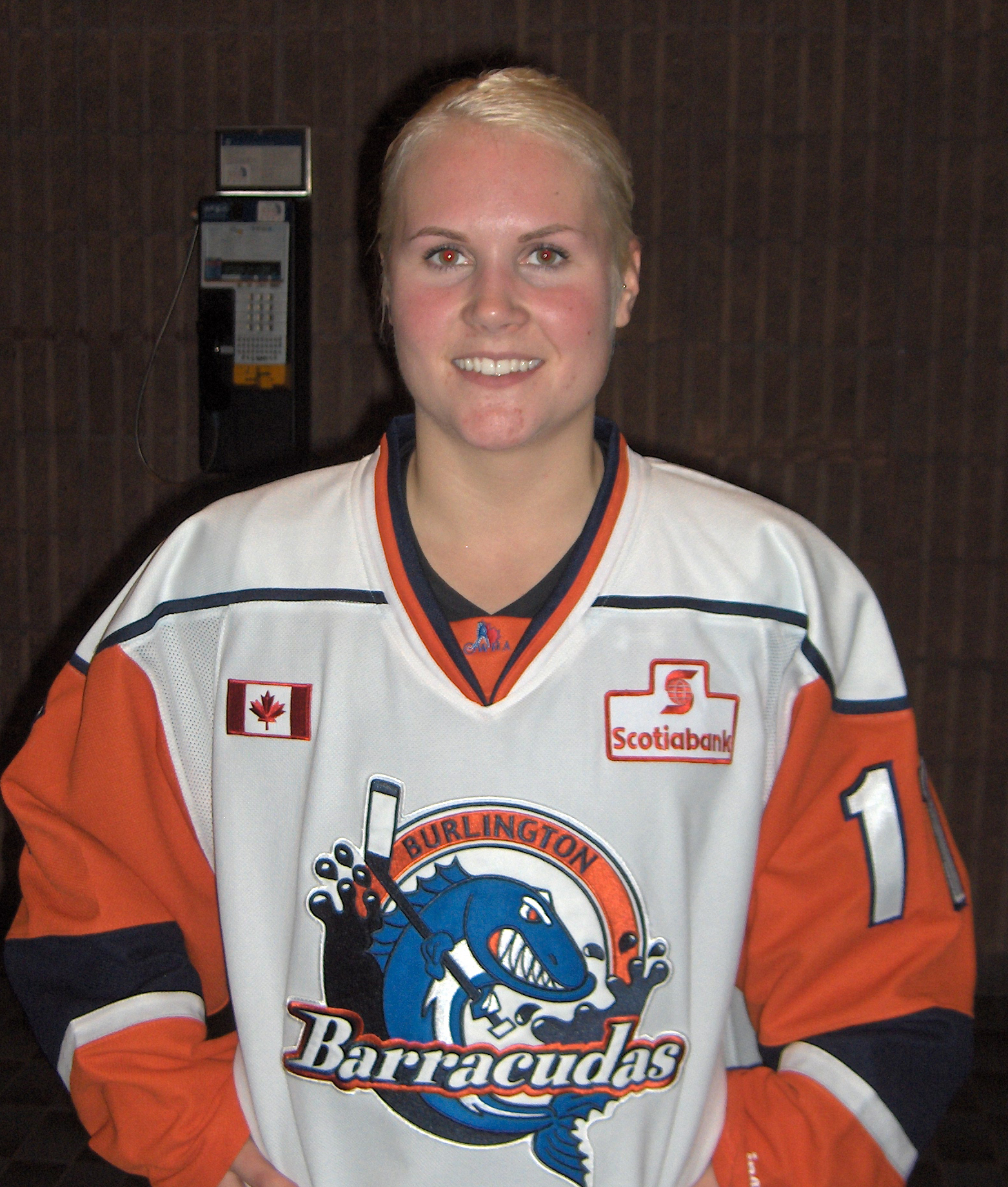
- Rajahuhta with the Burlington Barracudas of the CWHL in the 2011–12 season.
- Born: 8 March 1989 (age 37) Helsinki, Finland
- Height: 1.65 m (5 ft 5 in)
- Weight: 72 kg (159 lb; 11 st 5 lb)
- Position: Forward
- Shot: Left
- Played for: Porvoo-Borgå Hunters; IHK Helsinki; Tampereen Ilves; HPK Hämeenlinna; Burlington Barracudas; Espoo United; Kunlun Red Star; Espoo Blues; Kiekko-Espoo
- National team: Finland
- Playing career: 2005–2021
Medal record
Olympic Games
Bronze medal – third place	2010 Vancouver	Ice hockey
Bronze medal – third place	2018 Pyeongchang	Ice hockey
World Championship
Silver medal – second place	2019 Finland
Bronze medal – third place	2011 Switzerland
Universiade
Silver medal – second place	2011 Erzurum	Ice hockey
Bronze medal – third place	2009 Harbin	Ice hockey

Annina Rajahuhta (born 8 March 1989) is a Finnish retired ice hockey forward, currently serving as co-head coach of the Kiekko-Espoo girl's under-16 and under-18 teams. She played ten seasons with the Finnish national team, winning bronze medals at the 2010 and 2018 Winter Olympics prior to retiring from international competition in 2020.

== Playing career ==
In Finland, she played for HPK Kiekkonaiset in the Naisten SM-sarja (Finnish national women's league, renamed Naisten Liiga in 2017). For the 2011–12 CWHL season, Rajahuhta joined the Burlington Barracudas. In the bronze medal game at the 2012 IIHF Women's World Championship, Annina Rajahuhta scored a goal as Finland lost to Switzerland beat by a 6–2 tally.

=== CWHL ===
On 18 November 2011, Rajahuhta was one of several Burlington Barracudas players that competed in the first ever Hockey Helps the Homeless Women's Tournament. Said tournament was held at the Magna Centre in Newmarket, Ontario.

=== Other ===
Rajahuhta scored the only goal for Team World in a 3–1 loss at the 2019 Aurora Games.

== Career stats ==
=== Team Finland ===
Event	Goals	Assists	Points	Shots	PIM	+/-
2010 Winter Olympics	0	0	0	0	0	−2
