= Hockey Helps the Homeless =

Charitable Organisation based in Canada

Hockey Helps the Homeless (HHTH) is a volunteer-driven charitable organization established in 1996 with an office in Richmond Hill, Canada. HHTH hosts all-day Pro-am and Collegiate hockey tournaments across Canadian cities where all funds raised locally stay local to benefit homeless support agencies. They believe that every man, woman, and child should have a place to call home and the supports they need to thrive.

Former NHL player Mike Gartner is the honorary chairman and other notable NHL alumni and Olympians include Megan Bozek, Mike Comrie, Shayne Corson, Theo Fleury, Jayna Hefford, Kris King, Georges Laraque, Gary Leeman, Brad May, Meaghan Mikkelson, Caroline Ouellette, Gary Roberts, Natalie Spooner, Steven Stamkos, P.J. Stock, Darcy Tucker, Todd Warriner, Wendel Clark, and Doug Gilmour.

== History ==
The organization, originally called Hockey for the Homeless, was established by Gary Scullion. With a group of Toronto businessmen, they hosted their first charity hockey tournament raising just over $8,000 in 1996. In 1999, Hall of Famer Mike Gartner, friends of one of the founding members, suggested the tournament be turned into a Pro-am where amateur players could play alongside NHL Alumni and Olympians, forming the structure of the current day tournaments. The tournament has received media exposure from numerous outlets, including Hockey Night in Canada. Mike would later become an Honorary Chair of HHTH. On September 19, 2011, the organization changed its name from Hockey for the Homeless to Hockey Helps the Homeless to ensure clarity in its purpose.

In 2014, Great-West Life became the National Founding Sponsor across Canada with Freedom 55 Financial as the majority of their Presenting sponsors. As of 2018, Hockey Helps the Homeless has granted over $14 million in donations to over 45 beneficiaries and hosts 15 tournaments across Canada.

== Tournament Structure ==
HHTH currently hosts 15 tournaments annually across Canada. Pro-am Tournament cities include Toronto, Vancouver, Montreal, Calgary, Edmonton, Kitchener-Waterloo, York Region (Markham), Barrie, and London. Collegiate Tournaments include Queen's University (Kingston), Western (London), and Durham College (Oshawa). Events are held between the end of October to May. HHTH has recorded over 16,000 donors, 2,500 players, and 1,000 volunteers that participate annually.

From coast to coast, Pro-am participants receive a one-day fantasy tournament where they will play with 1-2 NHL Alumni (men's), Olympians (women's), or CWHL players (women's). Depending on the tournament, there is either a draft night a few days before or a dinner reception the day of the tournament. They also receive pro level jerseys and socks, participant gifts, and fully equipped dressing rooms. Breakfast, lunch, and dinner receptions with a Charity Impact Speaker are also provided. In November 2011, Hockey Helps the Homeless featured its first women's hockey tournament. The event was hosted in the Greater Toronto Area at the Magna Centre in Newmarket, Ontario. Said tournament involved numerous players from the Burlington Barracudas of the CWHL. Another women's tournament was hosted in Ottawa in April 2012 and featured players from the Montreal Stars and the McGill Martlets. Registered players pay a fee to participate, and with corporate sponsorship, funds raised help support charities for the homeless in the host city.

== Host cities ==
=== Ottawa ===
Bell Sensplex in Kanata, Ontario hosted the second annual tournament in April 2011. The 2011 edition featured the first women's tournament in Ottawa. Players such as Julie Chu, Lisa-Marie Breton, Alyssa Cecere, Marie-Philip Poulin, Gillian Ferrari, Caroline Ouellette and Catherine Ward participated. McGill Martlets alumni Ann-Sophie Bettez and Alyssa Cecere also played in the event. In one of the tournament contests, Catherine Ward was the goaltender. The women's tournament was won by the Ottawa Mission. Ottawa Senators alumni Laurie Boschman and Brad Marsh participated in the men's tournament, along with Rick Smith, a member of the Boston Bruins 1972 Stanley Cup team. Former Toronto Maple Leafs alumni Dan Daoust, Tom Fergus and Mark Osborne also participated.

=== Toronto ===
On November 18, 2011, Vancouver Winter Games participant Anniina Rajahuhta was one of several Burlington Barracudas players (including Christina Kessler, Shannon Moulson, Ashley Stephenson, Jana Harrigan, Amanda Shaw, Samantha Shirley, Amanda Parkins, and Lindsay Vine) who competed in the first ever Hockey Helps The Homeless Women's Tournament. Said tournament was held at the Magna Centre in Newmarket, Ontario.

=== Vancouver ===
UBC Thunderbird Arena hosted the third annual tournament on November 25, 2011. Vancouver Canucks alumni including Greg Adams, Garth Butcher, Mark Lofthouse, Gary Nylund, Moe Lemay and Larry Melnyk participated. In Vancouver, the tournament raised funds for RainCity Housing and Support Society, along with Lookout Society. Since its inception, the Vancouver tournament has raised $165,000.
