= Kathleen Kauth (ice hockey) =

American ice hockey player (born 1979)

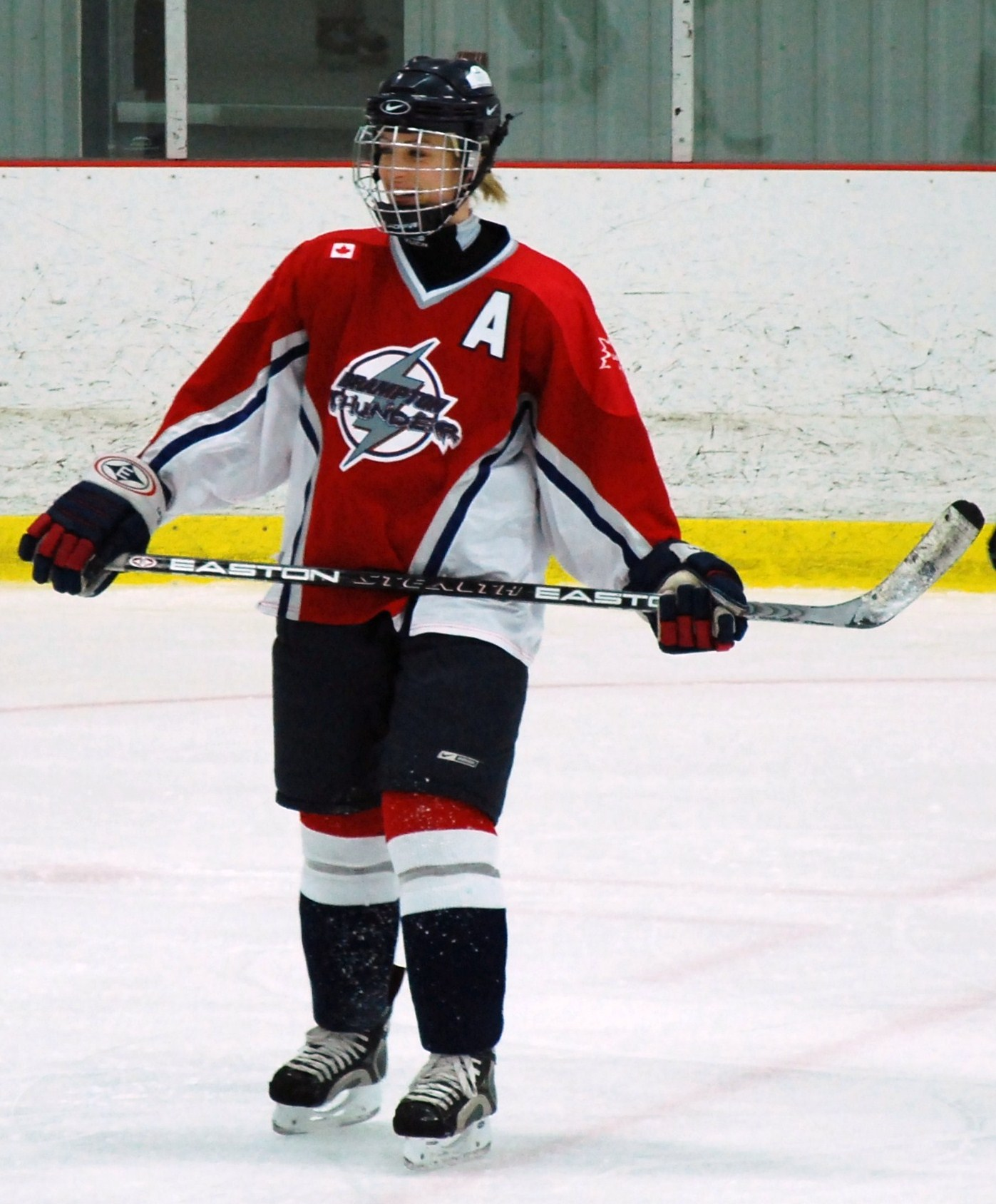
- Kauth with the Brampton Thunder in 2009
- Born: March 28, 1979 (age 47) Saratoga Springs, New York, U.S.
- Height: 5 ft 8 in (173 cm)
- Weight: 150 lb (68 kg; 10 st 10 lb)
- Position: Forward
- Shot: Left
- Played for: Brampton Thunder
- National team: United States
- Playing career: 2003–2009
Medal record
Representing United States
Women's ice hockey
Olympic Games
Bronze medal – third place	2006 Turin	Tournament
IIHF World Women's Championships
Gold medal – first place	2005 Sweden	Tournament
Silver medal – second place	2004 Canada	Tournament

Kathleen Anne Kauth (born March 28, 1979) is an American ice hockey player who previously competed for the Brampton Thunder during their affiliation with the NWHL.

== Playing career ==
=== USA Hockey ===
Kauth was chosen to be a member of the preliminary roster for the United States women's hockey team competing in the 2002 Winter Olympics. Building on her early involvement with the national team, she went on to represent the U.S. again at the 2006 Winter Olympics, where she played an important role in helping the team secure a bronze medal.

=== CWHL ===
Kauth, together with players like Allyson Fox, Kim McCullough, and national team members Sami Jo Small and Jennifer Botterill, led the effort to establish the Canadian Women's Hockey League (CWHL). They collaborated with a group of volunteer business professionals, modeling the league after the National Lacrosse League. The CWHL took on the responsibility of covering expenses such as travel, ice rental, uniforms, and some equipment.

== Personal life ==
Kauth completed her pre-med studies at Brown University in 2001. She and her partner, four-time Canadian Olympian Jayna Hefford, are parents to two daughters and a son. Together, they have also been part of the coaching staff for the Toronto Lady Blues women's ice hockey team, working under head coach Vicky Sunohara.

Kauth's father, Don, lost his life during the September 11 attacks while working at the World Trade Center. He was a bank analyst for Keefe, Bruyette & Woods, located on the 85th floor of the South Tower, which was the second tower hit by a plane on that day.
