= Burlington Barracudas =

Former Canadian Women's Hockey League team

- City: Burlington, Ontario, Canada
- League: Canadian Women's Hockey League
- Founded: 2007
- Folded: 2012
- Home arena: Appleby Ice Centre
- Colours: Orange, blue, white
- General manager: Maria Quinto
- Head coach: Berardino Quinto
- Website: Burlington Hockey Club - CWHL

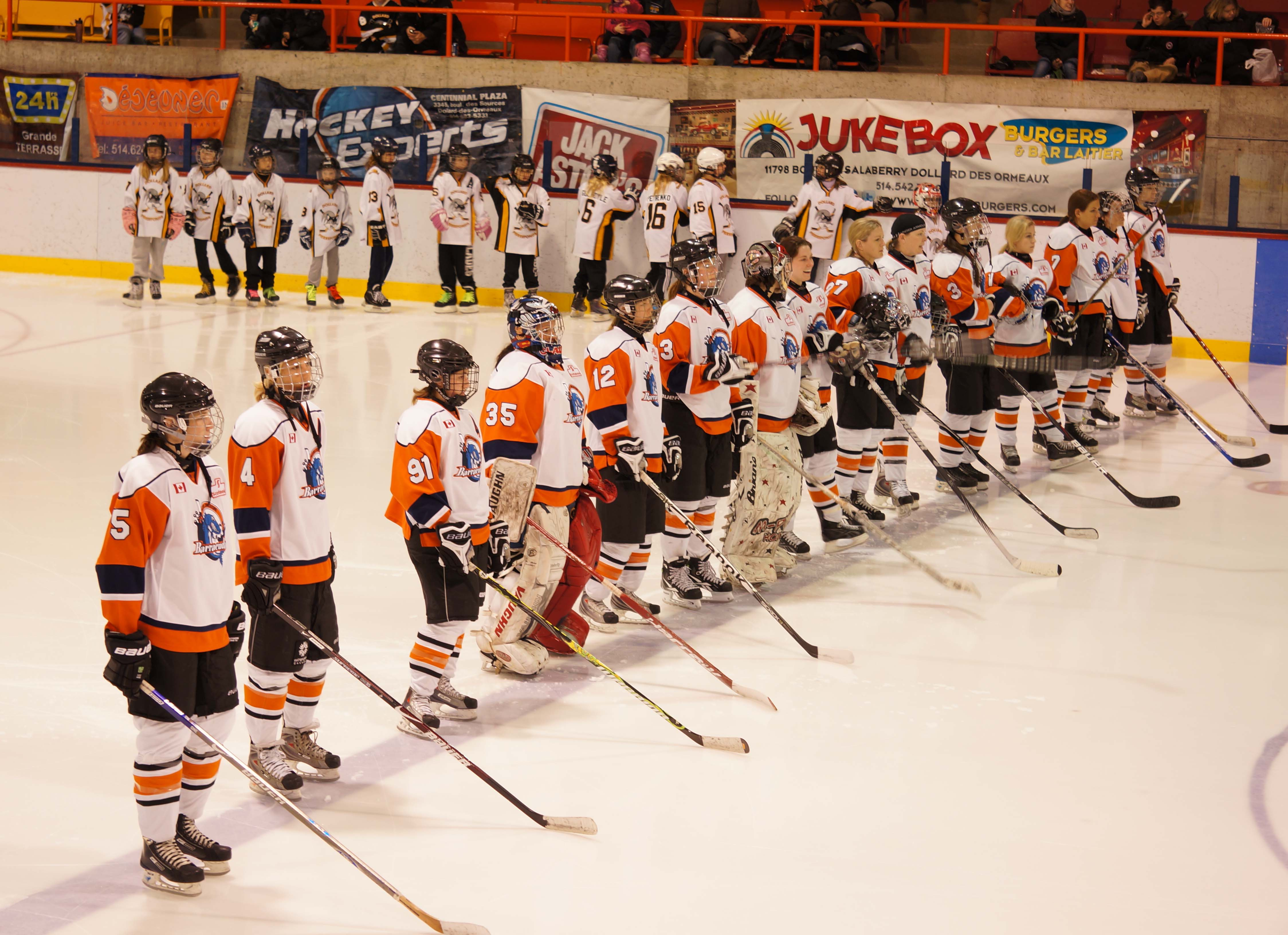
The Barracudas line up for the national anthem, January 2012.

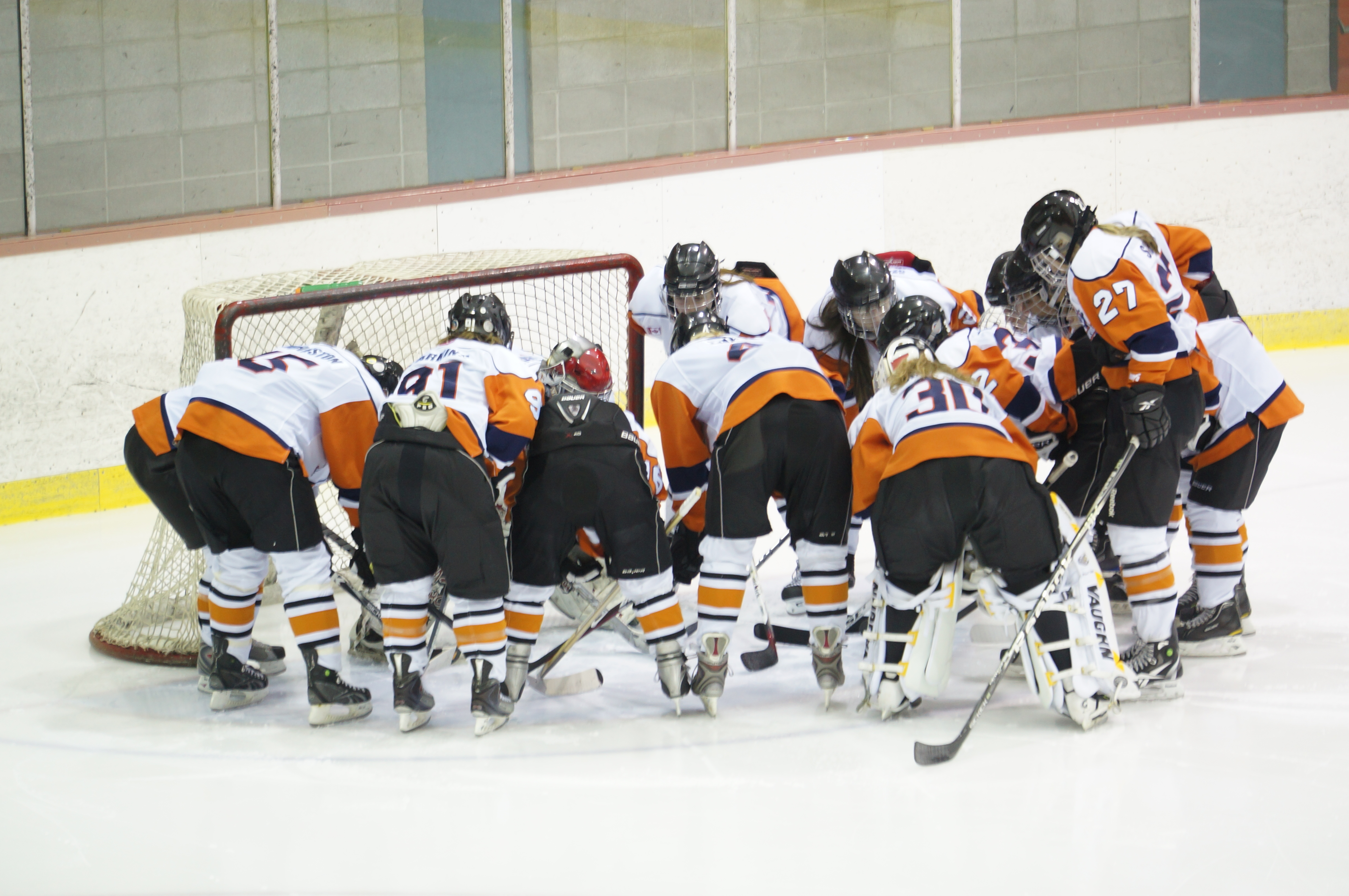
A team huddle to discuss strategy.

The Burlington Barracudas were a professional women's ice hockey team based in Burlington, Ontario. They were one of the founding teams of the Canadian Women's Hockey League (CWHL) from its inaugural season in 2007 until 2012. The Barracudas’ home ice was Appleby Ice Centre in Burlington.

== History ==
Burlington Barracudas defenceman Ashley “ Stretch “ Johnston was the youngest Ontarian player to play in the 2009–10 CWHL season. The team failed to qualify for the playoffs in the 2010–11 season.

== Season-by-season results ==
Note: Finish = Rank in league at end of regular season; GP = Games played, W = Wins (2 points), OTL = Overtime losses (1 point), L = Losses, GF = Goals for, GA = Goals against, Pts = Points, Top scorer: Points (Goals+Assists)

Season	League	Regular season								Postseason results	Top scorer (regular season)
Season	League	Finish	GP	W	OTL	L	GF	GA	Pts	Postseason results	Top scorer (regular season)
2007–08	CWHL	5th	30	11	1	18	76	98	23	Lost in second round (Brampton Canadettes Thunder)	(Canada) J. Harrigan 35 (18+17)
2008–09	CWHL	4th	30	11	3	16	82	99	25	Lost in first round (Montreal Stars)	(Canada) B. Kellar 14 (4+10)
2009–10	CWHL	3rd	30	19	3	8	94	80	41	Lost final (Brampton Thunder)	(Canada) B. Jenner 23 (11+12)
2010–11	CWHL	5th	26	6	2	18	54	108	14	Did not qualify	(Sweden) D. Rundqvist 15 (11+4)
2011–12	CWHL	6th	27	1	0	26	46	150	2	Did not qualify	(Canada) S. West 17 (6+11)

=== Community events ===
- On November 18, 2011, several Burlington Barracudas players (including Christina Kessler, Shannon Moulson, Ashley Stephenson, Jana Harrigan, Amanda Shaw, Annina Rajahuhta, Samantha Shirley, Amanda Parkins, and Lindsay Vine) competed in the first ever Hockey Helps the Homeless Women's Tournament. Said tournament was held at the Magna Centre in Newmarket, Ontario.
- Barracudas players Christina Kessler and Shannon Moulson were part of an event at Power Play Sports in Niagara Falls, Ontario on December 20, 2011, to promote the 2012 Clarkson Cup (to be held in Niagara Falls). After the event, they met players from the NFGHA (Niagara Falls Girls Hockey League) for photographs and autographs.

== Awards and honors ==
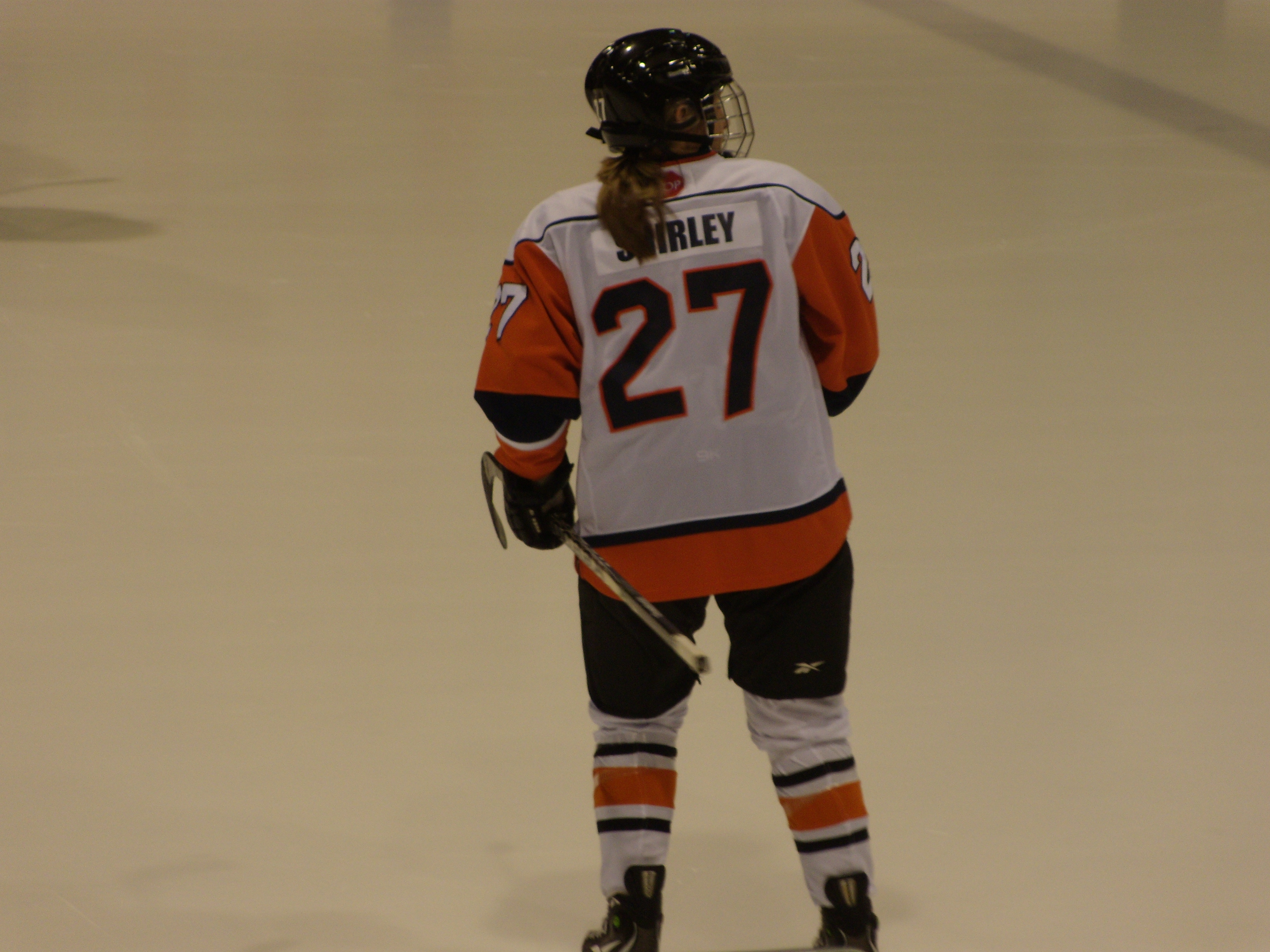
Samantha Shirley in action with the Burlington Barracudas

=== 2007-08 ===
==== CWHL Top Players ====
- Top Defender: Becky Kellar, Burlington

=== CWHL All-Stars ===
Central All-Stars

- Defender: Becky Kellar, Burlington
- Forward: Jana Harrigan, Burlington

=== Monthly Top Scorers ===
- November: Jana Harrigan, Burlington (5+3=8 points, 5 games)

=== 2008-09 ===
==== CWHL Top Players ====
- Top Defender: Becky Kellar, Burlington

== Draft history ==
=== 2010 Draft ===
The following were players selected by the Barracudas in the 2010 CWHL Draft. Because the league contracted from six to five teams, it was possible for some teams to reacquire players.

Draft #	Player	2009-10 Team
2	Ashley Riggs	Canadian Under 22 team
6	Christine Kessler	N/A
7	Shannon Moulson	Mississauga Chiefs
12	Natalie Payne	N/A
13	Danijela Rundqvist	N/A
18	Amanda Shaw	Zurich ZSC Lions
19	Kelley Hart	Burlington Barracudas (reacquired in draft)
24	Brianne McLaughlin	2009–10 United States women's national ice hockey team
25	Mallory Johnston	Burlington Barracudas (reacquired in draft)
30	Christine Hartnel	N/A
31	Danielle Blanchard	Vaughan Flames
36	Samantha Shirley	Vaughan Flames
37	Michele Janus	Burlington Barracudas (reacquired in draft)
40	Andrea Bevan	N/A
45	Jaclyn Pitushka	N/A
46	Kelley Stewart	Burlington Barracudas (reacquired in draft)
51	Amanda Perkins	Burlington Barracudas (reacquired in draft)
52	Ashley Stewart	Burlington Barracudas (reacquired in draft)

- Protected players

Player	2009-10 Team
Jana Harrigan	Burlington Barracudas
Becky Kellar	2009–10 Canada women's national ice hockey team
Lindsay Vine	Burlington Barracudas
Sommer West	Mississauga Chiefs

== Roster 2011–12 ==
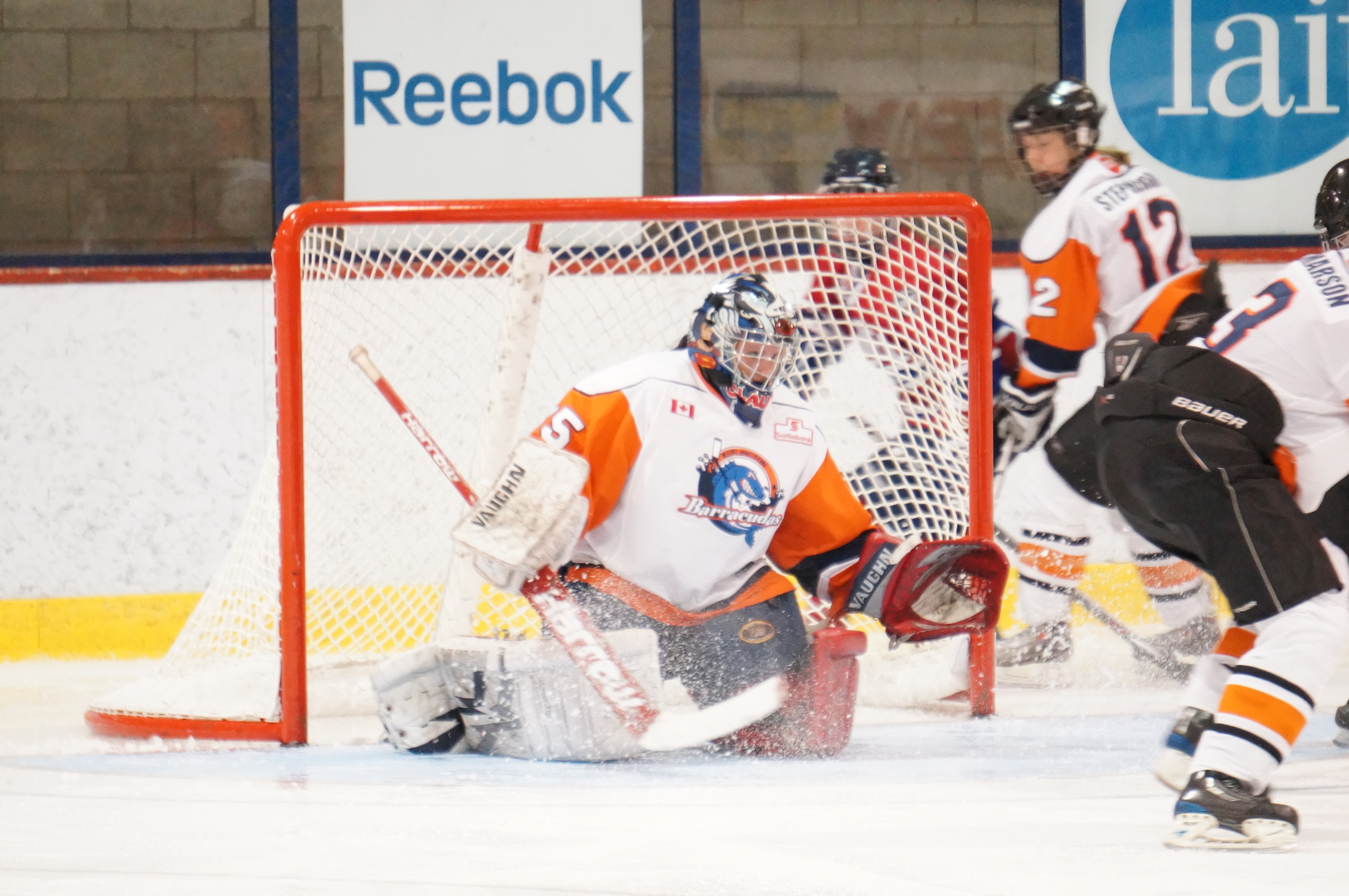
Christina Kessler

Goalies
Number		Player	Former Team	Hometown
30	(Canada)	Allison Cubberley	Elmira Soaring Eagles	Bracebridge, Ontario
35	(Canada)	Christina Kessler	Canada women's national ice hockey team	Mississauga, Ontario
1	(United States)	Mandy Cronin	Boston Blades	York, Maine

Defense
Number		Player	Former Team	Hometown
55	(Canada)	Amanda Nois	Minnesota Duluth Bulldogs women's ice hockey	Brampton, Ontario
23	(Canada)	Shannon Moulson	Mississauga Chiefs	Mississauga, Ontario
15	(Canada)	Mallory Johnston	Colgate University	Chatham, Ontario
12	(Canada)	Ashley Stephenson	Mississauga Chiefs	Mississauga, Ontario
4	(Canada)	Amanda Shaw	Boston University Terriers women's ice hockey	St Thomas, Ontario

Forwards
Number		Player	Former Team	Hometown
91	(Canada)	Amanda Parkins	Minnesota Duluth Bulldogs women's ice hockey	Kitchener, Ontario
44	(Canada)	Sommer West	Mississauga Chiefs	Bowmenville, Ontario
32	(Canada)	Jana Harrigan	Ohio State Buckeyes women's ice hockey	Burlington, Ontario
27	(Canada)	Samantha Shirley	Vaughan Flames	Mississauga, Ontario
24	(Canada)	Brayden Ferguson	St. Francis Xavier athletic teams	Toronto, Ontario
21	(Canada)	Sarah Dagg	Rochester Institute of Technology Tigers	Paris, Ontario
19	(Canada)	Lindsay Vine	Niagara Purple Eagles women's ice hockey	Oakville, Ontario
18	(Canada)	Dayna Kanis	Guelph Gryphons women's ice hockey	Georgetown, Ontario
16	(Canada)	Sara Lynch	Western Mustangs women's ice hockey	Owen sound, Ontario
11	(Finland)	Anniina Rajahuhta	Finland women's national ice hockey team	Helsinki, Finland
9	(Canada)	Joanne Eustace	Minnesota Duluth Bulldogs women's ice hockey	Torbay, Newfoundland
7	(Canada)	Kelly Hart	Bemidji State Beavers women's ice hockey	Ajax, Ontario

== Coaching staff 2011-12 ==
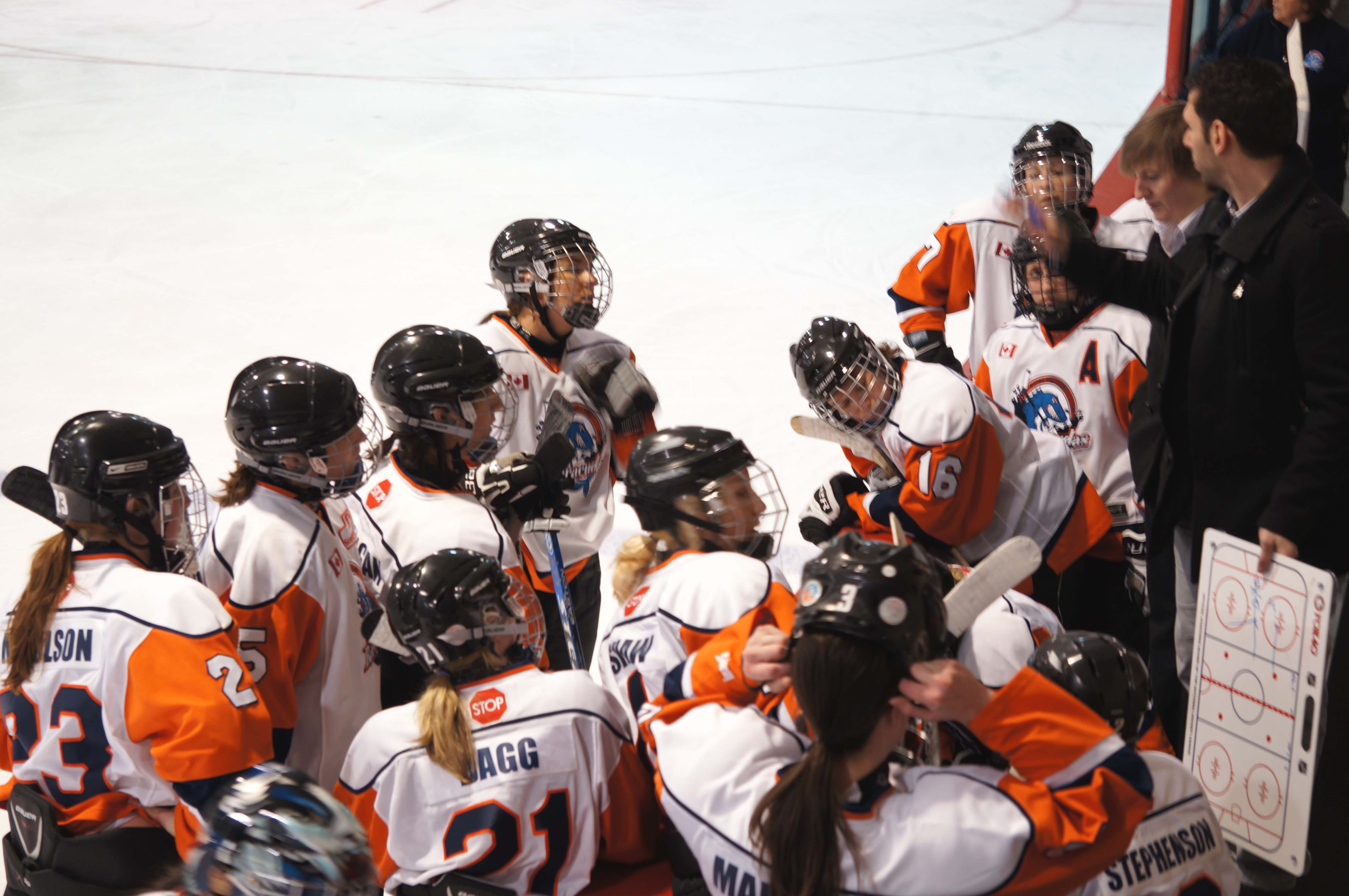
Barracudas'Head Coach Berardino Quinto

- General Manager: Maria Quinto
- Head Coach: Berardino Quinto
- Assistant Coach: Jessica Rattle
- Equipment Manager: Diane Cruickshanks & Madelaine Bird
- Marketing Coordinator: Deanne Johnstone
- Head Athletic Therapist: Nancy Spence
- Assistant Athletic Therapist: Glenn Burke
- Assistant Athletic Therapist: Carm Chan

== Olympians ==
Player	Position	Hometown	Olympic
(Canada) Becky Kellar	Defense	Burlington, Ontario	four-time Olympic medalist with the Canadian national team
(Sweden) Danijela Rundqvist	Forward	Stockholm, Sweden	three-time Olympian and two-time Olympic medalist with the Swedish national team
(Finland) Anniina Rajahuhta	Forward	Helsinki, Finland	two-time Olympic bronze medalist with the Finnish national team
