= Heather Logan-Sprenger =

Canadian cyclist

Heather Logan Sprenger
Personal information
- Born: Canada

Cycling career
- Sport: Cycling
- Discipline: Road cycling

Professional team
- 2009–2014: Forno d'Asolo Colavita

Heather Logan-Sprenger (born 14 May) is a retired professional road cyclist from Canada. She represented her nation at the 2009 UCI Road World Championships and the 2011 and 2012 Pan American Road and Track Championship. She competed in the US National Racing Calendar and the UCI's Women's World Tour race series from 2009 to 2013. In 2011 she won Stage 2 of the Tour of Gila and 3rd in Stage 3. She was the overall winner of the Green Sprint jersey for the 2011 Tour of Gila, NRC race in New Mexico. She also had many top 10 finishes in stages/races across the USA NRC calendar.

Before transitioning to cycling in 2009, she (née Logan) was the captain of the 2004 Under-22 (U22) Canadian National Women's Hockey team, a member of the team since 2001. She was the tournament MVP and leading scorer at the 2004 Air Canada Cup (Jr. World Championships) in Bad Tolz, Germany. As well, Heather was a member of Hockey Canada for six years (2002–2008) and played in the National Women's Hockey League (NWHL) for 10 seasons (2001–2011). She is a dual-sport national team athlete for Canada in both winter and summer sports.
