= Jennifer Botterill =

Canadian ice hockey player (born 1979)

Jennifer Botterill OM
- Hockey Hall of Fame, 2025
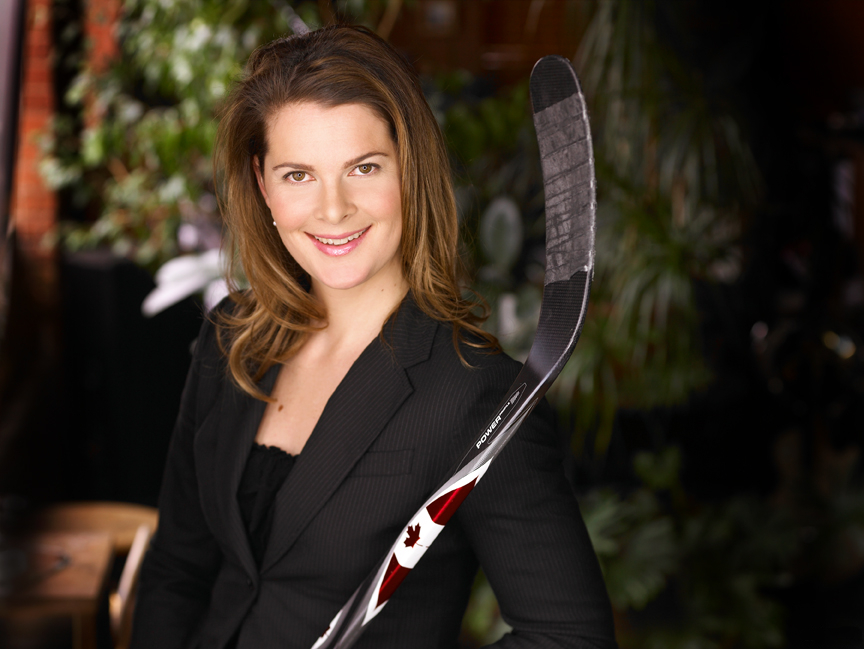
- Botterill in 2008
- Born: May 1, 1979 (age 47) Ottawa, Ontario, Canada
- Height: 5 ft 9 in (175 cm)
- Weight: 153 lb (69 kg; 10 st 13 lb)
- Position: Forward
- Shot: Left
- Played for: Harvard University; Mississauga Aeros; Mississauga Chiefs; Toronto CWHL
- National team: Canada
- Playing career: 1997–2011
- Website: Official Site
Medal record
Representing Canada
Women's ice hockey
Olympic Games
Gold medal – first place	2002 Salt Lake City	Tournament
Gold medal – first place	2006 Torino	Tournament
Gold medal – first place	2010 Vancouver	Tournament
Silver medal – second place	1998 Nagano	Tournament
IIHF World Women's Championships
Gold medal – first place	1999 Finland	Tournament
Gold medal – first place	2000 Canada	Tournament
Gold medal – first place	2001 United States	Tournament
Gold medal – first place	2004 Canada	Tournament
Gold medal – first place	2007 Canada	Tournament
Silver medal – second place	2005 Sweden	Tournament
Silver medal – second place	2008 China	Tournament
Silver medal – second place	2009 Finland	Tournament

Jennifer Botterill OM (BAH-ter-ill; born May 1, 1979) is a Canadian former women's hockey player and current hockey broadcast television analyst who played for Harvard University, the Canadian national team, the Mississauga Chiefs, and the Toronto Aeros. She entered the ice hockey world after starting in the sport of ringette.

During her ice hockey career as a player, Botterill assisted on the game-winning goal in her final international game, Canada's 2–0 win over the United States for the gold medal in the 2010 Winter Olympics. She previously served as a studio analyst for Sportsnet telecasts in Canada and currently serves as a colour commentator and studio analyst for TNT in the United States. Botterill was inducted into the Hockey Hall of Fame in 2025.

== Playing career ==
Botterill was born to Doreen McCannell and Cal Botterill. Her mother, Doreen, competed in the 1964 and 1968 Winter Olympics for Canada in speed skating. Her father, Cal, is a sports psychologist who has advised NHL teams and works with Canadian Olympic athletes. Botterill's brother, Jason Botterill, is the general manager of the Seattle Kraken. Previously, he played for and managed the Buffalo Sabres.

She was raised by her family in Winnipeg, Manitoba. In high school, she attended the National Sport School. Botterill eventually graduated with Honours from St. John's-Ravenscourt School in Winnipeg.

Botterill graduated from Harvard University in 2003 with a B.A. Psychology (with Honors). On May 5, 2012, she married hockey coach Adrian Lomonaco, and is a coach at the Toronto Hockey School.

=== Ringette ===
Botterill grew up playing ringette in Canada. As a teenager she competed in the sport for Team Manitoba in Grande Prairie, Alberta, at the 1995 Canada Winter Games, a national multi-sport competition for elite, Canadian amateur athletes.

=== Collegiate ===
Botterill attended Harvard University and played for the Harvard Crimson women's ice hockey program from 1998 to 2003. Harvard and several media outlets recognize Botterill as U.S. college ice hockey's career scoring leader (149 goals, 170 assists, 319 points). The NCAA does not recognize her record because women's hockey was not an NCAA-sanctioned sport in Botterill's first two college seasons. She scored at least one point in 112 of her 113 career college games (including a streak of 80 consecutive games). She was the first player to win the Patty Kazmaier Award twice as the top player in U.S. women's college hockey. Botterill set an NCAA record (since tied) for most points in one game with 10. This was accomplished on January 28, 2003 versus Boston College.

=== Club hockey ===
Botterill won her first of four national titles with the Calgary Oval X-Treme in 1998. She got an assist on Dana Antal's overtime winner in the Canadian Final.

After her college career, she won back-to-back national titles with the Toronto Aeros in 2004 and 2005. She scored the game-winning goal in the 2005 Abby Hoffman Cup Final.

With the Mississauga Chiefs in the new Canadian Women's Hockey League, she won the Angela James Bowl after winning the 2007-08 scoring title with 61 points. She was voted the CWHL Top Forward and a CWHL Central All-Star; she won CWHL Top Scorer of the Month honours in February. At Hockey Canada's 2008 National Championships, she got the assist on Cherie Piper's double overtime winner.

In 2008-09, she was a CWHL First Team All-Star.

Botterill retired after the 2010-11 season with the Toronto Furies. Her final game was the 2011 Clarkson Cup final, a 5–0 loss to the Montreal Stars. Despite playing just three seasons in the four-year-old CWHL, she retired as the league's second-best scorer with 160 points (in 79 games from 2007-08 to 2010-11). After winning the Angela James Bowl in 2007-08, she finished third in the league scoring race in both 2008-09 and 2010-11.

=== International ===
She won the silver medal in the 1998 Winter Olympics in Nagano in 1998 as the youngest player on the Canadian team. Later, she won the gold medal in the 2002 games in Salt Lake City, Utah, at the 2006 Winter Olympics in Turin, and at the 2010 Winter Olympics in Vancouver, playing forward. Botterill announced her retirement, on March 14, 2011. Her last appearance with Team Canada was on February 25, 2010 at the 2010 Olympic Games in Vancouver. Her final point was also on February 25 when, she assisted Marie-Philip Poulin on the gold medal-winning goal.

==== World Championship biography ====
1999, 2000, 2001, 2004, 2007 World Champion

2005, 2008, 2009 Silver Medallist

== Career statistics ==
Career statistics are from USCHO.com, or Eliteprospects.com or the Team Canada Media Guide for 2009-10.

=== Regular season and playoffs ===
			Regular season					Playoffs
Season	Team	League	GP	G	A	Pts	PIM	GP	G	A	Pts	PIM
1998–99	Harvard University	AWCHA	28	37	51	88	34	—	—	—	—	—
1999–00	Harvard University	AWCHA	23	31	31	62	18	—	—	—	—	—
2000–01	Harvard University	ECAC Hockey	30	42	36	78	30	—	—	—	—	—
2002–03	Harvard University	ECAC Hockey	32	47	65	112	14	—	—	—	—	—
2003–04	Toronto Aeros	NWHL	36	30	31	61	16	2	1	2	3	2
2004–05	Toronto Aeros	NWHL	29	22	33	55	18	6	1	7	8	0
2006–07	Mississauga Aeros	NWHL	21	15	19	34	14	—	—	—	—	—
2007–08	Mississauga Chiefs	CWHL	25	22	34	56	22	5	6	1	7	2
2008–09	Mississauga Chiefs	CWHL	28	25	30	55	30	—	—	—	—	—
2010–11	Toronto CWHL	CWHL	25	14	30	44	12	4	1	3	4	4
CWHL totals			78	61	94	155	64	9	7	4	11	1

=== International ===
Year	Team	Event	Result	GP	G	A	Pts	PIM
1997	Canada	3 Nations Cup	2nd place, silver medalist(s)	5	1	0	1	0
1998	Canada	OG	2nd place, silver medalist(s)	6	0	0	0	0
1998	Canada U22	Xmas	1st place, gold medalist(s)	6	2	3	5	0
1999	Canada	WC	1st place, gold medalist(s)	5	1	3	4	0
1999	Canada	3 Nations Cup	1st place, gold medalist(s)	5	3	4	7	0
2000	Canada	WC	1st place, gold medalist(s)	5	1	5	6	2
2000	Canada	4 Nations Cup	1st place, gold medalist(s)	4	3	6	9	6
2001	Canada	WC	1st place, gold medalist(s)	5	8	2	10	4
2001	Canada	3 Nations Cup	1st place, gold medalist(s)	4	2	1	3	2
2002	Canada	OG	1st place, gold medalist(s)	5	3	3	6	8
2003	Canada	4 Nations Cup	2nd place, silver medalist(s)	4	1	3	4	0
2004	Canada	WC	1st place, gold medalist(s)	5	3	8	11	0
2005	Canada	WC	2nd place, silver medalist(s)	5	1	6	7	4
2005	Canada	4 Nations Cup	1st place, gold medalist(s)	4	1	1	2	0
2005	Canada	Torino Ice	1st place, gold medalist(s)	3	3	1	4	4
2006	Canada	OG	1st place, gold medalist(s)	5	1	6	7	4
2006	Canada	4 Nations Cup	1st place, gold medalist(s)	4	1	6	7	2
2007	Canada	WC	1st place, gold medalist(s)	5	3	2	5	2
2007	Canada	4 Nations Cup	1st place, gold medalist(s)	4	5	2	7	2
2008	Canada	WC	2nd place, silver medalist(s)	5	4	4	8	4
2008	Canada	4 Nations Cup	2nd place, silver medalist(s)	4	0	2	2	2
2009	Canada	WC	2nd place, silver medalist(s)	5	5	3	8	2
2010	Canada	OG	1st place, gold medalist(s)	4	0	2	2	0
U22 totals				6	2	3	5	0
Senior totals				101	50	70	120	48

== Awards and honours ==
Award	Year
Hockey Hall of Fame	2025
Abby Hoffman Cup	1998, 2004, 2005, 2008
NWHL Championship	2004-05
Angela James Bowl	2007-08
CWHL Top Forward	2007-08
CWHL Central All-Stars	2007-08
CWHL First All-Star Team	2008-09
American Women's College Hockey Alliance Women's Ice Hockey Championship	1998-99
Patty Kazmaier Award	2000–01, 2002-03
American Women's College Hockey Alliance All-Americans, First Team	1999
Province of Manitoba Female Athlete of the Year Award	2001
Order of Manitoba	2006
Manitoba Hockey Hall of Fame	2007

International
Award	Year
Most Valuable Player at the IIHF World Women's Championships	2001, 2004
Best Forward Directorate Award at the IIHF World Women's Championships	2001

Preceded by Incumbent	Angela James Bowl; 2008	Succeeded by Jayna Hefford (2009)
Preceded by Katja Riipi (2000)	IIHF World Women's Championships Best Forward; 2001	Succeeded by Jayna Hefford (2004)
Preceded by First awarded in 2001	IIHF World Women's Championships Most Valuable Player; 2001, 2004	Succeeded by Krissy Wendell (2005)
Preceded by Ali Brewer (2000)	Patty Kazmaier Award; 2001	Succeeded by Brooke Whitney (2002)
Preceded by Brooke Whitney (2002)	Patty Kazmaier Award; 2003	Succeeded by Angela Ruggiero (2004)
