= Leslie Oles =

Canadian ice hockey player

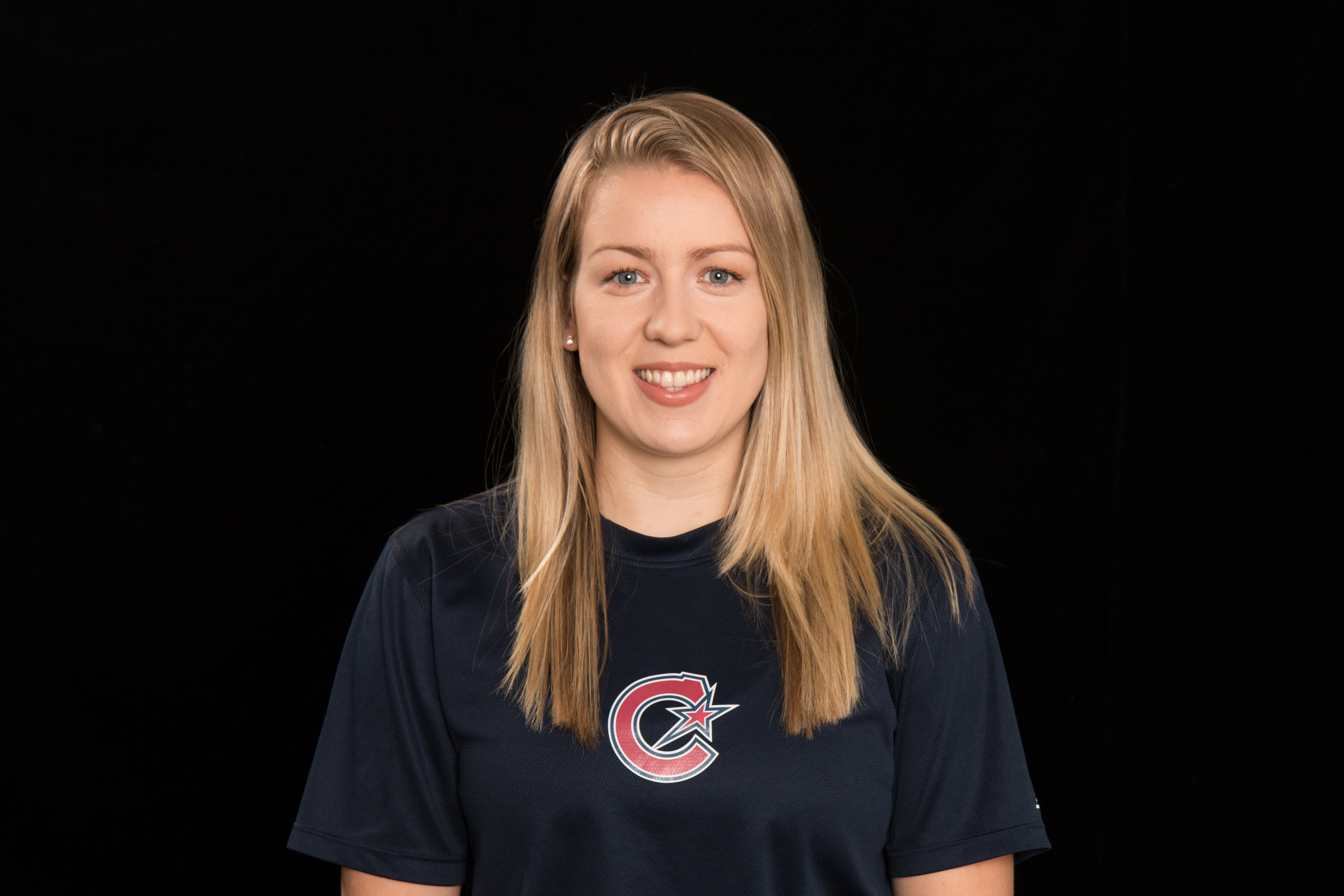
- Born: 18 November 1990 (age 35) Beaconsfield, Québec, Canada
- Height: 162 cm (5 ft 4 in)
- Weight: 61 kg (134 lb; 9 st 8 lb)
- Position: Forward
- Shoots: Left
- CWHL; CIAU; CWHL; SWHL; team: Montreal Stars; McGill Martlets; Montreal Canadiennes; EV Bomo Thun
- Played for: Canada
- Playing career: 2007–present

Leslie Oles (born 18 November 1990 in Beaconsfield, Quebec) is a Canadian ice hockey player. She started played a professional hockey when she was 17, helping the player-run Canadian Women's Hockey League (CWHL) start up. She was elected to the all-star team and in her second season helped the Montreal Stars win the Clarkson Cup. She later joined the interuniversity league while studying physical education at McGill University. She was a member of Canada's Under-18 Team and won a silver medal at the 2008 world championships.

== Club career ==
Leslie Oles started playing hockey at the age of 4. She played in boys' leagues. At age 17 she received a Montreal Canadiens scholarship.

From 2006 to 2008, Oles was a member of Canada's National Under-18 Team and won a silver medal at the 2008 U18 World Championships.

In the 2007–08 Canadian Women's Hockey League (CWHL) season, Oles was the youngest player of the Montreal Stars at 17. She attended Kuper Academy, a private English day school, to complete her high school education while helping the new league get started. She finished second in team scoring with 16 goals and 16 assists for a total of 32 points in 20 games played. With teammate Marie-Philip Poulin, she was elected to the CWHL All-Star Team and to the CWHL Eastern Division All-Star Team. In her second season (2008–09) she helped the Stars in win the Clarkson Cup.

Starting in 2010 Oles played with the McGill Martlets of the Canadian Interuniversity Sport league (CIAU). In her first academic season (2010–11) she helped the Martlets win the championship. In her second season (2011–12) she set a new record, becoming the best scorer in the Quebec Conference (RSEQ) with 10 goals and 4 assists (14 points) in 9 games played. In 2012–13 Oles finished sixth for scoring and led the league in penalty minutes; with a younger team, the Martlets were undefeated in the regular season but lost both games in the playoffs.

After playing five seasons in university league, Oles returned to the CWHL drafted by the Stars, renamed Les Canadiennes de Montreal that season. She helped them reach the playoffs in the 2015–16 season but because she had played in the inaugural season Oles was not considered for rookie of the year.

Oles joined the Switzerland women's ice hockey league for 2017–18, playing for EV Bomo Thun. A Thun press release said that the team would be counting on Oles' scoring skills while also valuing her high penalty minutes to create the necessary respect on the ice.

== Honours and distinctions ==
- 2016–17 CWHL Champion
- Voted all-star at the 2011 Canadian University Championship
- 2009 Clarkson Cup champion
- Chosen on the CWHL Rookie Team (2007–08)
- Silver medal at the 2008 IIHF Under-18 World Hockey Championship
- Won the All-Canadian League All-Star Team (2007–08)
- Player of the Game at the final of the 2007 Canadian Women's U18 Championship, where Quebec won the silver medal
