= Mandy Cronin =

American ice hockey player and manager

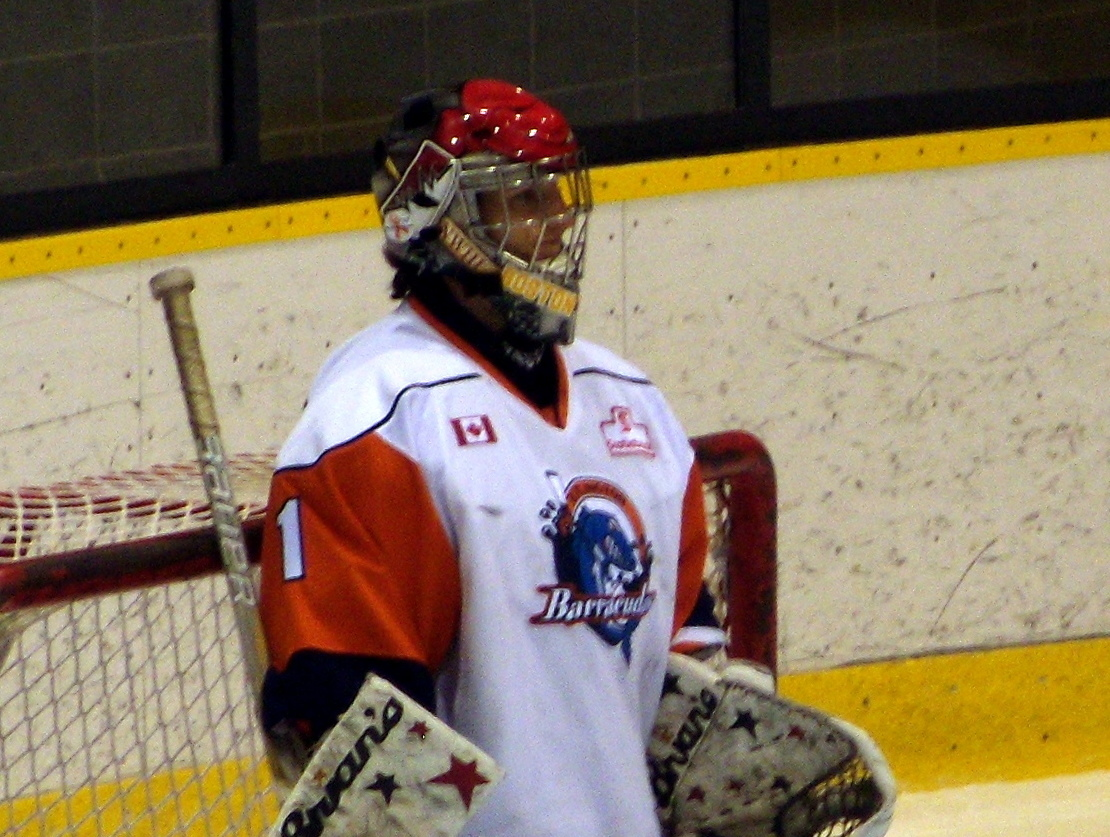
- Cronin in 2011
- Born: February 17, 1980 (age 46) York, Maine, United States
- Height: 175 cm (5 ft 9 in)
- Position: Goaltender
- Played for: Burlington Barracudas; Boston Blades; Brampton Thunder
- Playing career: 2002–2012

Mandy Cronin is both an American ice hockey executive and former player. She was the general manager of the National Women's Hockey League's (NWHL) Buffalo Beauts and Toronto Six, as well as one of the co-founders of the Canadian Women's Hockey League.

== Playing career ==
Cronin played four seasons for the University of Maine Black Bears women's ice hockey program from 1998 to 2002. She would serve as team captain in her final two seasons. Graduating with a program record nine shutouts, she still shared the record as of the 2020–21 season with Meghann Treacy.

After graduating, she signed with the former National Women's Hockey League. After five years in that league, she was one of the seven players who founded the Canadian Women's Hockey League (CWHL), where she would play for a further five years. In 2007 and 2008, she won the Clarkson Cup with Brampton. In 2010, she left Brampton to sign with the newly formed Boston Blades, the first American CWHL team.

== Post-playing career ==
Cronin served as a goaltending coach for the University of Toronto under Vicky Sunohara, and has served as a goaltending coach for USA Hockey. In 2019, she was named the general manager of the Buffalo Beauts a team in the newer Premier Hockey Federation, and was one of three women to hold GM posts in the PHF at the time. Her appointment came after most of the Beauts' roster left to join the Professional Women's Hockey Players Association and Pegula Sports and Entertainment gave up their ownership of the team. In 2020, Cronin was announced as the general manager of the expansion Toronto Six, but was released in February 2021.

Preceded by Cody McCormick, 2019	General Manager of the Buffalo Beauts; 2019–20	Succeeded by Nate Oliver, 2020–present
