= Christina Kessler =

Canadian ice hockey player

- Born: May 28, 1988 (age 37) Mississauga, Ontario, Canada
- Height: 5 ft 6 in (168 cm)
- Weight: 139 lb (63 kg; 9 st 13 lb)
- Position: Goaltender
- Catches: Left
- PWHL ECAC CWHL team: Toronto Jr. Aeros; Harvard Crimson (2006-10); Burlington Barracudas (2010-12)
- National team: Canada
- Playing career: 2006–present

Christina Kessler
Medal record

Women's ice hockey

Representing Canada

Women's 4 Nations Cup
Gold medal – first place	2010 Canada	Tournament
Silver medal – second place	2011 Sweden	Tournament

Meco Cup
Gold medal – first place	2010 Germany	2010 Tournament
Gold medal – first place	2013 Germany	2013 Tournament

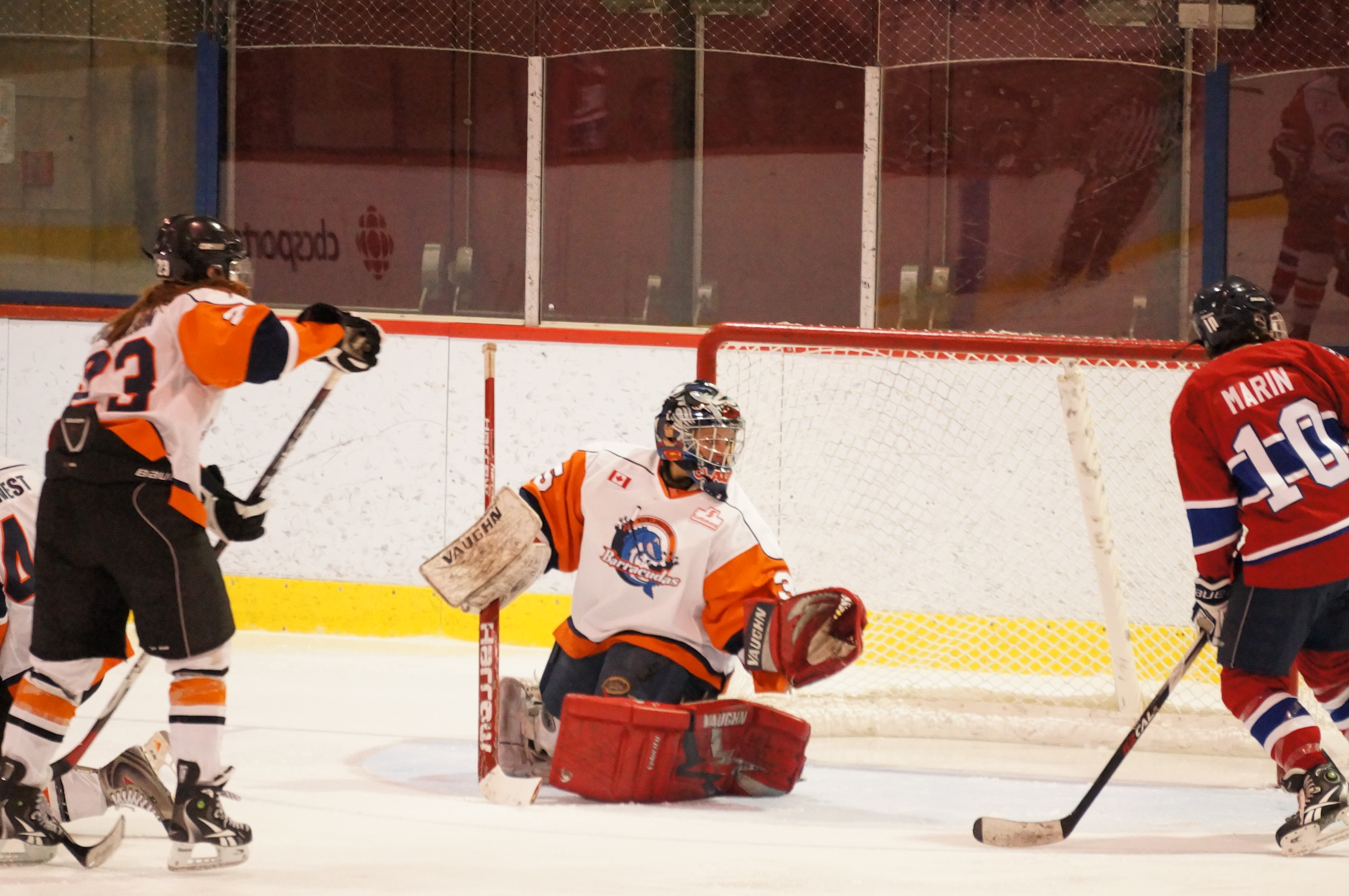
Kessler plays for Burlington Barracudas

Christina Kessler (born May 28, 1988) has competed for the Canadian National women's ice hockey team. Her debut with Team Canada was at the 2010 Four Nations Cup where she was part of the gold medal-winning squadron. She played for the Burlington Barracudas in the Canadian Women's Hockey League before being claimed by the Brampton Thunder in the dispersal section of the 2012 CWHL Draft. With the Toronto Furies, she was recognized as the Most Valuable Player of the 2014 Clarkson Cup.

== Playing career ==
Kessler participated in the PWHL for the Toronto Jr. Aeros. During the 2005–06 season, she led the squad to an undefeated regular season. In addition, she helped the team claim league and provincial titles.

=== Harvard ===
Kessler joined the Harvard Crimson in the autumn of 2006 and appeared in 12 games with 11 starts. As a rookie, she logged eight wins, while earning shutouts against the Princeton Tigers (on Nov. 25 and Jan. 5), and against nationally ranked Minnesota Duluth (Dec. 2). The shutouts that she registered on November 25 and December 2 came in her second and third collegiate games of her career. This was part of a period in which she went 150 minutes without allowing a goal. She would only give up one goal during her first three NCAA contests. On December 8, she made a then career high 33 saves in a tie against nationally ranked New Hampshire. During the 2007-08 campaign, Kessler set the NCAA single-season record with 12 shutouts. In addition, she led all NCAA goaltenders with a .952 save percentage (679 of 713) and winning percentage (30–2–0, .938). With Kessler in net, the Crimson set the all-time record for fewest goals allowed in a season. In a January 27, 2008 win versus Dartmouth (a 4–0 shutout), she surpassed Ali Boe for the Crimson single-season shutout record by notching her eighth. Boe set the previous mark with seven shutouts in 2003–04. In the 2008 women's Beanpot, Kessler blocked 41 of 43 shots during the tournament to win the Joe Bertagna Award. On February 1, Kessler earned her first NCAA assist. In a match against Brown, Kessler assisted on a goal logged by Kathryn Farni. A February 23 victory over Cornell (by a 4-2 tally) gave Kessler her 25th victory of the season. Her junior season (2008–09) resulted in her being named to the ECAC Hockey preseason all-league team. Statistically, she ranked first in the ECAC with a 1.55 goals-against average in conference play. In the Beanpot semifinal (from February 3, 2009), she stopped 17 shots against Boston University as the Crimson prevailed. A February 20 win over the St. Lawrence Skating Saints resulted in Kessler's fourth shutout of the season. During the ECAC Quarterfinals (on February 27 and 28), Kessler logged back-to-back shutouts against Cornell (by tallies of 3–0, 4–0), respectively.

As a senior (2009–10), Kessler was fifth in the NCAA with a .944 save percentage. She would also rank fifth with a 1.39 goals-against average. In the Crimson's season opening match versus Colgate (contested on October 30, 2009), Kessler registered 29 saves. On November 14, she would set a career high by blocking 37 shots versus Princeton. On December 4 and 5, 2010, Kessler had one of the best performances of her NCAA career. She recorded 24 saves against Minnesota on Dec. 4, as the Crimson prevailed by a 1–0 mark. She followed up her performance with 29 saves to guide Harvard to a 0–0 tie the following day. Entering the weekend, Minnesota had not been shut out since the 2006–07 season. A December 8 victory versus the Connecticut Huskies (in which the Crimson earned a 2–1 win) resulted in Kessler tying Ali Boe for the Harvard career win record of 63. Win number 64 came on January 16, 2010, in a 21 save effort that resulted in a 5–1 victory over the Colgate Raiders. Her career save percentage of .9414 (1,863 of 1,979 shots) is the all-time best in NCAA history.

=== Hockey Canada ===
She was in attendance for the first ever IIHF development camp (held in Vierumaki, Finland). Kessler represented the OWHA and Hockey Canada. In 2006, she was selected to Canada's under-22 national team but did not compete due to injury. Kessler was part of the Canadian Under 22 squad that participated in a three-game series versus the US Under 22 team in August 2009. Kessler accumulated 40 saves in two games for Canada's Under-22 Team. In January 2009, she was part of the silver medal-winning team at the MLP Cup in January 2009. In two games played, she logged two shutouts and 35 saves. She was the backstop for the Canadian Under-22 Team which won a gold medal at 2010 MLP Cup. She would log a shutout with 15 saves in gold-medal game against Switzerland. She made her debut for the Canadian National women's hockey team at the 2010 Four Nations Cup. Kessler won a gold medal as she was one of the backup goaltenders to Shannon Szabados. She travelled to Bratislava, Slovakia to participate in the 2011 IIHF High Performance Women's Camp from July 4–12. In the first game of the 2011 IIHF Eight Nations Tournament, Kessler earned the shutout in a 16–0 victory over Switzerland. On October 3, 2011, she was named to the Team Canada roster that participated in the 2011 4 Nations Cup.

=== CWHL ===
- On November 18, 2011, she was one of several Burlington Barracudas players that competed in the first ever Hockey Helps the Homeless Women's Tournament. Said tournament was held at the Magna Centre in Newmarket, Ontario.
- Along with Barracudas teammate Shannon Moulson, she was part of an event at Power Play Sports in Niagara Falls, Ontario on December 20, 2011, to promote the 2012 Clarkson Cup (to be held in Niagara Falls). After the event, they met players from the NFGHA (Niagara Falls Girls' Hockey League) for photographs and autographs.

=== Awards and honours ===
- ECAC Rookie of the Week (Week of November 27, 2006)
- ECAC Goaltender of the Week (Week of December 5. 2006)
- ECAC Rookie of the Week (Week of January 8, 2007)
- 2007 ECAC Hockey League All-Academic Team
- 2008 ECAC Goaltender of the Year
- 2008 Joe Bertagna Award as the best goaltender in the Beanpot
- 2007-08 RBK Hockey/AHCA All-America Second Team
- 2007-08 First Team All-ECAC
- 2007-08 First Team All-Ivy League
- 2007-08 New England Hockey Writers Division I Women's All-Star Team
- NCAA single season record, Most Shutouts in one season (12), accomplished in 2007–08
- 2008 ECAC Tournament Team
- ECAC Goaltender of the week (Week of December 1, 2009)
- ECAC Goaltender of the week (Week of December 8, 2009)
- 2008-09 All-Ivy League first team
- 2008-09 All-ECAC Hockey second team
- 2008-09 New England Hockey Writers Division I All-Star Team
- 2009-10 ECAC Hockey preseason all-league team
- 2009-10 All-Ivy League honorable mention
- 2009-10 Academic All-Ivy League
- 2010 nominee for Patty Kazmaier Award
- NCAA record holder for career save percentage (1,863 of 1,979, .9414)
