= Jayna Hefford =

Canadian ice hockey player (born 1977)

- Hockey Hall of Fame, 2018
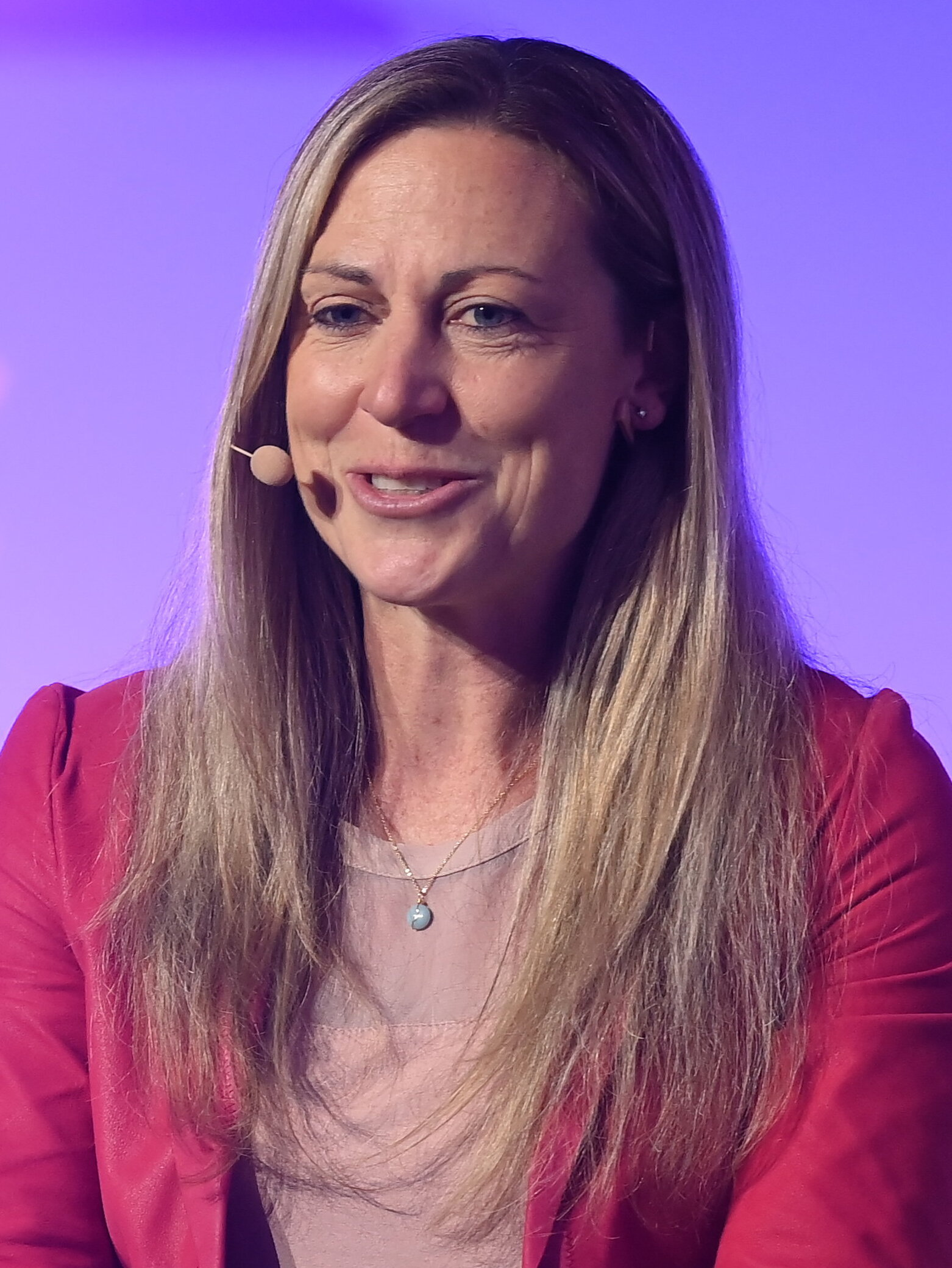
- Hefford in 2022
- Born: May 14, 1977 (age 49) Trenton, Ontario, Canada
- Height: 5 ft 5 in (165 cm)
- Weight: 140 lb (64 kg; 10 st 0 lb)
- Position: Right Wing
- Shot: Left
- Played for: Mississauga Chiefs; Brampton Thunder
- National team: Canada
- Playing career: 1996–2014
Medal record
Representing Canada
Women's ice hockey
Olympic Games
Gold medal – first place	2002 Salt Lake City	Tournament
Gold medal – first place	2006 Turin	Tournament
Gold medal – first place	2010 Vancouver	Tournament
Gold medal – first place	2014 Sochi	Tournament
Silver medal – second place	1998 Nagano	Tournament
IIHF World Women's Championships
Gold medal – first place	1997 Canada	Tournament
Gold medal – first place	1999 Finland	Tournament
Gold medal – first place	2000 Canada	Tournament
Gold medal – first place	2001 United States	Tournament
Gold medal – first place	2004 Canada	Tournament
Gold medal – first place	2007 Canada	Tournament
Gold medal – first place	2012 United States	Tournament
Silver medal – second place	2005 Sweden	Tournament
Silver medal – second place	2008 China	Tournament
Silver medal – second place	2009 Finland	Tournament
Silver medal – second place	2011 Switzerland	Tournament
Silver medal – second place	2013 Canada	Tournament
Women's 4 Nations Cup
Gold medal – first place	2010 Canada	Tournament

Commissioner of the Canadian Women's Hockey League
- In office August 1, 2018 – May 1, 2019
- Preceded by: Brenda Andress

Personal details
- Spouse: Kathleen Kauth
- Children: 3
- Education: University of Toronto

Jayna Hefford (born May 14, 1977) is a Canadian retired ice hockey player and current executive vice president of hockey operations for the Professional Women's Hockey League (PWHL).

Hefford got her start in the sport of ringette but soon moved into ice hockey. During her hockey career, she won multiple medals at the Winter Olympics and IIHF World Women's Championships as well as titles in the National Women's Hockey League and Canadian Women's Hockey League. She helped Canada win four-straight Olympic gold medals from 2002 to 2014 and famously scored the gold medal-winning goal at the 2002 Winter Olympics. At the club level across three leagues, she scored 439 goals in 418 competitive games including a CWHL record 44 goals in 2008–09.

She was selected to be inducted to the Hockey Hall of Fame on June 26, 2018. On July 19, 2018, Hefford was named interim commissioner of the Canadian Women's Hockey League. She was named a 2019 Order of Hockey in Canada recipient.

Hefford was born in Trenton, Ontario. She previously played for the Mississauga Chiefs and Brampton Thunder.

== Playing career ==
At the 1994 national under-18 championship, Hefford was part of the gold medal-winning Ontario team. In 1995, Hefford participated with the Ottawa Regional Select Team in a series against the U.S. National Under-18 Team. Hefford was the captain of Team Ontario at the 1995 Canada Winter Games.

=== U of T Varsity Blues ===
Hefford played for the Toronto Varsity Blues women's ice hockey program, which represented the University of Toronto. In the 1997 OWIAA semifinal, Hefford was part of the Varsity Blues squad which defeated the Guelph Gryphons by a 4–1 tally. In that game, Hefford accumulated three helpers. In the 1997 OWIAA gold medal game, scored 23 seconds into overtime and she believed that the goal clinched the gold medal for the Blues. A little-known rule denied Hefford and her teammates the Blues second consecutive title. OWIAA league rules indicated that the first five-minute overtime session in a playoff game must be played in its entirety (as a regular period). It was advised that the game would continue after Hefford's goal and York won the game in the second overtime. Hefford joined former University of Toronto student-athlete Heather Moyse as the only University of Toronto graduates to claim a gold medal at the 2010 Vancouver Winter Games. She is currently an assistant coach with her former team.

=== Hockey Canada ===
At the 2010 Olympics in Vancouver, Hefford ranked second on Team Canada with 12 points (5 goals, 7 assists) in 5 games on the way to her fourth medal (third gold).

In the 2006 tournament, Hefford scored three goals and added four assists to finish third on the team in scoring and Canada again won the gold medal. It was her second gold medal while participating in her third Olympics. She also won a silver medal with the Canadian team at the 1998 Winter Olympics in Nagano.

In the 2002 Olympics in Salt Lake City, Hefford scored the game-winning goal in the gold medal game against Team USA with four seconds remaining in the second period.

Hefford won the gold in six World Championships – 1997, 1999, 2000, 2001, 2004 and 2007. In 1999 and 2000, Hefford was Team Canada's leading scorer. Her two third period goals in the 2000 championship game pushed the contest into overtime, allowing Canada the opportunity to win. At the 2005 Esso National Women's Championships, she was named the Best Forward for Group A.

On January 1, 2010, in Ottawa, Ontario, she was honoured before a game versus Team USA for reaching the 200-game plateau in her Team Canada career in November. She would go on to score the lone shootout goal later that night.

In the first game of the 2011 IIHF Eight Nations Tournament, Hefford registered a hat trick in a 16–0 victory over Switzerland. In the third game of the tournament, she scored two goals in an 11–0 shutout over Slovakia. In an exhibition game versus the United States on August 29, 2011, Hefford scored a power play goal, and then scored twice in the shootout as Canada defeated the United States by a 4–3 tally. In a game versus Russia at the 2012 IIHF Women's World Championship, Hefford registered a four-point performance (two goals, two assists) in a 14–1 victory.

Hefford again played for Canada at the 2014 Winter Olympics, earning her fourth gold medal. After 17 years, four Olympic gold medals and multiple world championships, she retired from the national women's team at age 38, after sitting out the 2014–2015 season. She stands second only to Hayley Wickenheiser in all-time games played (267), goals (157) and points (291) for Canada. The pair are the only two Canadian women to have played in all five Olympic women's hockey tournaments starting in 1998, winning four gold and one silver medal. They are among only five athletes (with teammate Caroline Ouellette) to win gold in four consecutive Winter Games. Hefford also appeared in 12 of 16 women's world hockey championships earning seven gold medals.

=== Club hockey ===
Jayna Hefford made her senior competitive debut with the Mississauga Chiefs in 1996–97, scoring 32 goals in 30 games and winning Rookie of the Year honours in the Central Ontario Women's Hockey League. After spending the 1997–98 season with Canada, she joined the newly formed Brampton Thunder for the 1998–99 season and finished second in the league with 34 goals scored in just 27 games (with the league renamed the National Women's Hockey League midway through the season). After scoring 25 goals in 1999–2000, she won her first goal-scoring title in 2000–01 with 36 goals. She also led the league in scoring with 69 points.

After spending the 2001–02 season with Canada, she returned to the Thunder and scored 37 goals in 2002–03, an NWHL record 41 goals in 2003–04, and 39 goals in 2004–05. She was the NWHL's Player of the Year in 2004–05. She then spent the 2005–06 season with Canada, winning her third-straight Olympic gold medal.

In 2006–07, Hefford eclipsed the 40-goal plateau for the second time in her NWHL career, also leading the league with a career-best 70 points. In the playoffs, she helped the Thunder win the NWHL playoff championship.

In 2007–08, she led the new Canadian Women's Hockey League (CWHL) with 26 goals in 27 games for the Brampton Canadettes Thunder. She was named the CWHL's Most Valuable Player of the 2007–08 CWHL season, an award voted on by the league's six team captains. In addition, she was also a CWHL Central All-Star. Despite winning CWHL Top Scorer of the Month honours on four separate occasions (September, November, December, January), she lost the Angela James Bowl scoring race by three points to Jennifer Botterill's 61 points. It marked the first time since 1999–2000 that in a year when Hefford played a full season, she did not win her league scoring race. In the playoffs, Hefford helped Brampton win the first CWHL championship.

In 2008–09, she won the Angela James Bowl after scoring 69 points in 28 games. She set new league records with 69 points, 44 goals, 11 power-play goals, six shorthanded goals and seven hat tricks. She is the first player in the Canadian Women's Hockey League to record 100 career points. She recorded the record-setting point milestone on January 17, 2009, in a win over the Montreal Stars.

In 2009–10, she was absent from the Brampton Thunder for most of the season due to the centralization of Canada's women's hockey Olympic team. After Canada's win in Vancouver, she returned to participate in the Clarkson Cup and had a goal and an assist in Brampton's semi-final win over the Montreal Stars. Brampton lost to the Minnesota Whitecaps in the final.

On January 18, 2011, the Thunder competed against the Montreal Stars at the Invista Centre in Kingston, Ontario. This is team captain Jayna Hefford's hometown and she scored a goal in front of her closest friends, family and fans. In addition, her number 15 was raised to the rafters of the Invista Centre on behalf of the Kingston Area Minor Hockey Association. As of 2012, no sweaters bearing Hefford's number will be used in Kingston minor hockey.

Hefford scored 439 goals in 418 games in the COWHL, NWHL, and CWHL. She was the NWHL's all-time leading goalscorer with 252 goals from 1998–99 to 2006–07. In a seven-year stretch from 2000–01 to 2006–07, she won or co-won five NWHL scoring titles and won five NWHL goal-scoring titles. The only years in which she did not win were 2001–02 and 2005–06, the two years in which she missed most of the club campaign because she was away winning a gold medal with Canada's Olympic team.

Hefford also retired as the CWHL's all-time leader in goals (130) and points (234), although both records have since been broken. In 2017, she was named to the All-Time CWHL Team from the league's first decade.

== Post-playing career ==
In 2016, the CWHL introduced the Jayna Hefford Trophy in her honour. Awarded to the most outstanding player in the regular season as judged by the players of the CWHL, the first winner of the Trophy was Marie-Philip Poulin, a former teammate of Hefford at the 2010 and 2014 Winter Games.

Heading into the 2018–19 CWHL season, Hefford was appointed to the position of interim commissioner of the CWHL. Announced on July 19, 2018, replacing inaugural commissioner Brenda Andress, Hefford took on the role on August 1, 2018. A week after the 2019 Clarkson Cup Final, the CWHL announced that it was no longer viable, and would be closing down on May 1, 2019. The Professional Women's Hockey Players Association (PWHPA) was formed from the fall out, and the player members asked Hefford to be the operations consultant of the association.

In 2023, when the Professional Women's Hockey League (PWHL) was formed, Hefford ascended into her new role as senior vice president of hockey operations. Hefford led the initiatives for the implementation of new rules, including "Jailbreak Goals" and the "No Escape Rule" during her time as SVP. On Jan. 28, 2025, Hefford was promoted to executive vice president of hockey operations, with the league expressing its intention to continue to grow.

== Personal life ==
Hefford was raised by her parents Larry and Sandra along with her brother Mike; she calls Kingston, Ontario her home town. She began playing hockey around the age of six.

Hefford is mother to two daughters, Isla and Arwen, and a son, Lachlan, with her partner, former Team USA Olympian and Canadian Women's Hockey League co-founder Kathleen Kauth. Both have also served on the coaching staff for the University of Toronto Varsity Blues women's ice hockey program under head coach Vicky Sunohara.

Hefford is a national spokesperson for the Canadian Hockey Association's Initiation Programme. In 2009, she set up a charity golf tournament, the Jayna Hefford Links 4 Life Golf Classic, in July 2009. The tournament raised $15,000 for the cancer and palliative care undertaken at Kingston's university hospitals.

== Career statistics ==
=== Regular season and playoffs ===
			Regular season					Playoffs
Season	Team	League	GP	G	A	Pts	PIM	GP	G	A	Pts	PIM
1996–97	University of Toronto	CIAU	12	23	11	34	8	—	—	—	—	—
1996–97	Mississauga Chiefs	COWHL	30	32	34	66	20	—	—	—	—	—
1998–99	Brampton Thunder	NWHL	27	34	19	53	30	—	—	—	—	—
1999–00	Brampton Thunder	NWHL	31	25	31	56	53	—	—	—	—	—
2000–01	Brampton Thunder	NWHL	27	30	29	59	34	4	2	3	5	10
2001–02	Brampton Thunder	NWHL	—	—	—	—	—	4	5	3	8	6
2002–03	Brampton Thunder	NWHL	28	32	23	55	32	1	0	0	0	6
2003–04	Brampton Thunder	NWHL	35	41	23	64	42	5	7	4	11	8
2004–05	Brampton Thunder	NWHL	33	39	34	73	26	2	2	1	3	0
2005–06	Brampton Thunder	NWHL	1	0	2	2	0	5	5	2	7	10
2006–07	Brampton Thunder	NWHL	17	20	18	38	16	—	—	—	—	—
2007–08	Brampton Thunder	CWHL	27	26	32	58	56	5	2	2	4	6
2008–09	Brampton Thunder	CWHL	28	44	25	69	36	—	—	—	—	—
2010–11	Brampton Thunder	CWHL	27	25	23	48	32	3	0	5	5	4
2011–12	Brampton Thunder	CWHL	27	21	13	34	28	4	1	0	1	6
2012–13	Brampton Thunder	CWHL	21	15	12	27	18	3	0	1	1	4
NWHL totals			199	229	179	408	233	21	21	13	34	40
CWHL totals			130	131	105	236	170	15	3	8	11	20

=== International ===
Year	Team	Event	Result	GP	G	A	Pts	PIM
1998	Canada	OG	2nd place, silver medalist(s)	6	1	0	1	6
1999	Canada	WC	1st place, gold medalist(s)	5	5	6	11	0
2000	Canada	WC	1st place, gold medalist(s)	5	5	3	8	4
2001	Canada	WC	1st place, gold medalist(s)	5	2	2	4	6
2002	Canada	OG	1st place, gold medalist(s)	5	3	4	7	2
2004	Canada	WC	1st place, gold medalist(s)	5	7	3	10	2
2005	Canada	WC	2nd place, silver medalist(s)	5	6	2	8	0
2006	Canada	OG	1st place, gold medalist(s)	5	3	4	7	0
2007	Canada	WC	1st place, gold medalist(s)	5	2	1	3	2
2008	Canada	WC	2nd place, silver medalist(s)	5	3	5	8	8
2009	Canada	WC	2nd place, silver medalist(s)	5	1	6	7	2
2010	Canada	OG	1st place, gold medalist(s)	5	5	7	12	8
2011	Canada	WC	2nd place, silver medalist(s)	5	3	2	5	2
2012	Canada	WC	1st place, gold medalist(s)	5	3	6	9	4
2013	Canada	WC	2nd place, silver medalist(s)	5	2	4	6	2
2014	Canada	OG	1st place, gold medalist(s)	5	1	2	3	2
WC Totals				55	39	40	79	33
OG Totals				26	13	17	30	18

== Awards and honours ==
- 1996–97 OWIAA Rookie of the Year
- Top scorer in the OWIAA (1996–97)
- Angela James Bowl, 2008–09
- CWHL Most Valuable Player, 2007–08
- CWHL Top Forward, 2008–09
- CWHL First All-Star Team, 2008–09
- CWHL Central All-Stars, 2007–08
- 1996/97 Ontario Women's Intercollegiate Athletic Association Rookie of the Year, as well as the 1998 Kingston and Ontario Amateur Athlete of the Year.
- Recognized at the 1999 and 2000 World Championships as the tournament's top goal scorer and scored at least one point in every game at the 2000 event in Canada.
- In 2002, Hefford was inducted into the Brampton Sports Hall of Fame in 2002.
- Top Forward, 2003 Esso Women's Nationals
- 2004 World Women's Championship Directorate Award as Top Forward and was named to the Tournament All Star team.
- 2005 World Women's Championship Directorate Award as Top Forward
- Top Forward, 2006 Esso Women's National Hockey Championship, Pool A
- Top Forward at the 2008 Esso Women's National Championship in Charlottetown, Prince Edward Island.
- 2019 Order of Hockey in Canada recipient
- Order of Sport, induction into Canada's Sports Hall of Fame in 2019.

Preceded by Jennifer Botterill (2008)	Angela James Bowl; 2009	Succeeded by Sabrina Harbec (2010)
Preceded by Jennifer Botterill (2001)	IIHF World Women's Championships Best Forward; 2004, 2005	Succeeded by Hayley Wickenheiser (2007)
Preceded by Brenda Andress (2007–2018)	CWHL Commissioner; 2018–2019	Succeeded by None - CWHL dissolution
