= Therese Brisson =

Canadian ice hockey player

- Born: October 5, 1966 (age 60) Dollard-des-Ormeaux, Quebec, Canada
- Height: 5 ft 7 in (170 cm)
- Weight: 150 lb (68 kg; 10 st 10 lb)
- Position: Defence
- National team: Canada
- Playing career: 1993–2005
Medal record
Representing Canada
Women's ice hockey
Olympic Games
Gold medal – first place	2002 Salt Lake City	Tournament
Silver medal – second place	1998 Nagano	Tournament
IIHF World Women's Championships
Gold medal – first place	1994 United States	Tournament
Gold medal – first place	1997 Canada	Tournament
Gold medal – first place	1999 Finland	Tournament
Gold medal – first place	2000 Canada	Tournament
Gold medal – first place	2001 United States	Tournament
Gold medal – first place	2004 Canada	Tournament

Therese Brisson (born October 5, 1966) is a Canadian former ice hockey player. Brisson played for the Canadian National and Olympic women's ice hockey team from 1993 to 2005. Brisson was a member of Team Canada’s gold medal winning team at the 2002 Winter Olympics in Salt Lake City. She helped Canada win six World Championships in 1994, 1997, 1999, 2000, 2001, and 2004. She earned a silver medal at the 1998 Winter Olympics in Nagano, Japan, which marked the first time that women’s hockey was played on an Olympic level.

== Playing career ==
Brisson competed for the Ferland Quatre Glaces (first based out of Brossard, and then Repentigny) team in the League Régionale du Hockey au Féminin in the province of Québec. She studied Kinesiology at Montreal’s Concordia University, was named athlete of the year in 1988 and 1989, and in 1997, she was inducted into Concordia University’s Sports Hall of Fame. In 1994, Brisson made her debut for Team Canada at the World Championships, playing alongside such stalwarts as Manon Rhéaume, Cassie Campbell, Geraldine Heaney and France St. Louis. She would be named an All-Star defence at the tournament. Brisson was Team Canada’s Captain at the World Championships in 1999, 2000 and 2001. Brisson represented Team New Brunswick at the 1998 Esso women's hockey nationals. She scored one goal and an assists to defeat Team Saskatchewan and finish in fifth place.

At the 2002 Winter Olympics, Brisson led all Canadian defenders in scoring at the tournament. Brisson had two goals and three assists in helping Canada win its first gold medal in Women’s Olympic hockey.

Brisson also played several seasons for Montreal Axion, a professional women's ice hockey team in the National Women's Hockey League.

As part of the IIHF Ambassador and Mentor Program, Brisson was a Hockey Canada athlete ambassador that travelled to Bratislava, Slovakia to participate in the July 2011 IIHF High Performance Women's Camp.

== Personal ==
After the Olympics, she completed an MBA at the Schulich School of Business, York University in Toronto. Brisson had completed a M.Sc. and Ph.D. in Kinesiology (Motor Control & Learning) at Université de Montréal and was a former professor in kinesiology at the University of New Brunswick. Brisson was Marketing & Sales executive with over 16 years of CPG leadership experience at Procter & Gamble Canada and Kimberly-Clark. She also served as a director on the boards of the Canadian Olympic Committee from 2009-2021 and Own the Podium from 2005-2020. She was appointed President & CEO of Alpine Canada in August 2020.

== Career statistics ==
=== Regular season and playoffs ===
			Regular season					Playoffs
Season	Team	League	GP	G	A	Pts	PIM	GP	G	A	Pts	PIM
1986-87	Concordia University	CIAU	—	—	—	—	—	—	—	—	—	—
1987-88	Concordia University	CIAU	—	—	—	—	—	—	—	—	—	—
1988-89	Concordia University	CIAU	—	—	—	—	—	—	—	—	—	—
1999-2000	Montreal Wingstar	NWHL	16	5	7	12	12	—	—	—	—	—
2000-01	Mississauga Ice Bears	NWHL	1	0	0	0	0	—	—	—	—	—
2002-03	Mississauga Ice Bears	NWHL	30	10	11	21	28	—	—	—	—	—
2003-04	Oakville Ice	NWHL	34	5	18	23	52	1	0	0	0	0
2004-05	Oakville Ice	NWHL	27	4	15	19	26	—	—	—	—	—
2005-06	Oakville Ice	NWHL	7	0	5	5	6	—	—	—	—	—

=== International ===
Year	Team	Event	Result	GP	G	A	Pts	PIM
1994	Canada	WC	1st place, gold medalist(s)	5	2	2	4	6
1997	Canada	WC	1st place, gold medalist(s)	5	0	0	0	2
1998	Canada	OG	2nd place, silver medalist(s)	6	5	2	7	6
1999	Canada	WC	1st place, gold medalist(s)	5	0	3	3	2
2000	Canada	WC	1st place, gold medalist(s)	5	1	2	3	2
2001	Canada	WC	1st place, gold medalist(s)	5	0	6	6	2
2002	Canada	OG	1st place, gold medalist(s)	5	2	3	5	6
2004	Canada	WC	1st place, gold medalist(s)	5	0	3	3	6

== Awards and honours ==
- 1988 Concordia University Female Athlete of the Year (Sally Kemp Award)
- 1989 Concordia University Female Athlete of the Year (Sally Kemp Award)
- Best Defender, 1998 Esso Nationals

Preceded by Stacy Wilson (1997–98)	Captain, Cdn National Women's Hockey Team; 1999–2001	Succeeded by Cassie Campbell (2002–06)
