= Kathy McCormack =

Canadian ice hockey player

- Born: February 16, 1974 (age 52) Blackville, New Brunswick, Canada
- Height: 5 ft 9 in (175 cm)
- Weight: 165 lb (75 kg; 11 st 11 lb)
- Position: Forward
- National team: Canada
- Playing career: 1996–2006
Medal record
Representing Canada
Women's ice hockey
Olympic Games
Silver medal – second place	1998 Nagano	Tournament
Three Nations Cup
Silver medal – second place	1997

Katheryn McCormack (born February 16, 1974) is a retired ice hockey forward who played for the Mississauga Ice Bears, Oakville Ice, and the Canadian national team. She was a member of the 1998 Canadian Olympic women's team that participated in ice hockey at the 1998 Winter Olympics, winning a silver medal. She played with the Canadian National team from 1997 to 2001.

== Playing career ==
At the age of eight, McCormack started playing hockey on boys teams. The first time that she played on a team consisting of girls was at the 1991 Canada Winter Games for New Brunswick. She was a Team Canada member at the U.S. Olympic Festival in 1993 in San Antonio, Texas

At the 1995 Canadian championships, McCormack played with the New Brunswick provincial team and won a silver medal. The following year, she would win a bronze medal at the Canadian championships. In 1996, she joined the Maritimes Sports Blades. One of her teammates was future Olympian Stacy Wilson.

In 1999 she moved to Oakville, Ontario to skate with the Oakville Ice of the National Women's Hockey League. On November 27, 2009, McCormack carried the Olympic torch through her hometown of Blackville, New Brunswick in preparation for the 2010 Winter Olympics in Vancouver. She plays recreational hockey for the Leaside Wildcats.

== Career statistics ==
=== Regular season and playoffs ===
			Regular season					Playoffs
Season	Team	League	GP	G	A	Pts	PIM	GP	G	A	Pts	PIM
1999-2000	Mississauga Chiefs	NWHL	33	19	16	35	43	—	—	—	—	—
2000-01	Mississauga Ice Bears	NWHL	35	14	20	34	40	—	—	—	—	—
2001-02	Mississauga Ice Bears	NWHL	28	6	14	20	27	—	—	—	—	—
2002-03	Mississauga Ice Bears	NWHL	36	18	18	36	22	—	—	—	—	—
2003-04	Oakville Ice	NWHL	23	6	12	18	18	2	0	0	0	0
2004-05	Oakville Ice	NWHL	28	8	13	21	24	—	—	—	—	—
2005-06	Oakville Ice	NWHL	31	11	15	26	36	2	0	1	1	0

=== International ===
Year	Team	Event	Result	GP	G	A	Pts	PIM
1998	Canada	OG	2nd place, silver medalist(s)	6	0	0	0	0
