= Becky Kellar-Duke =

Canadian ice hockey player (born 1975)

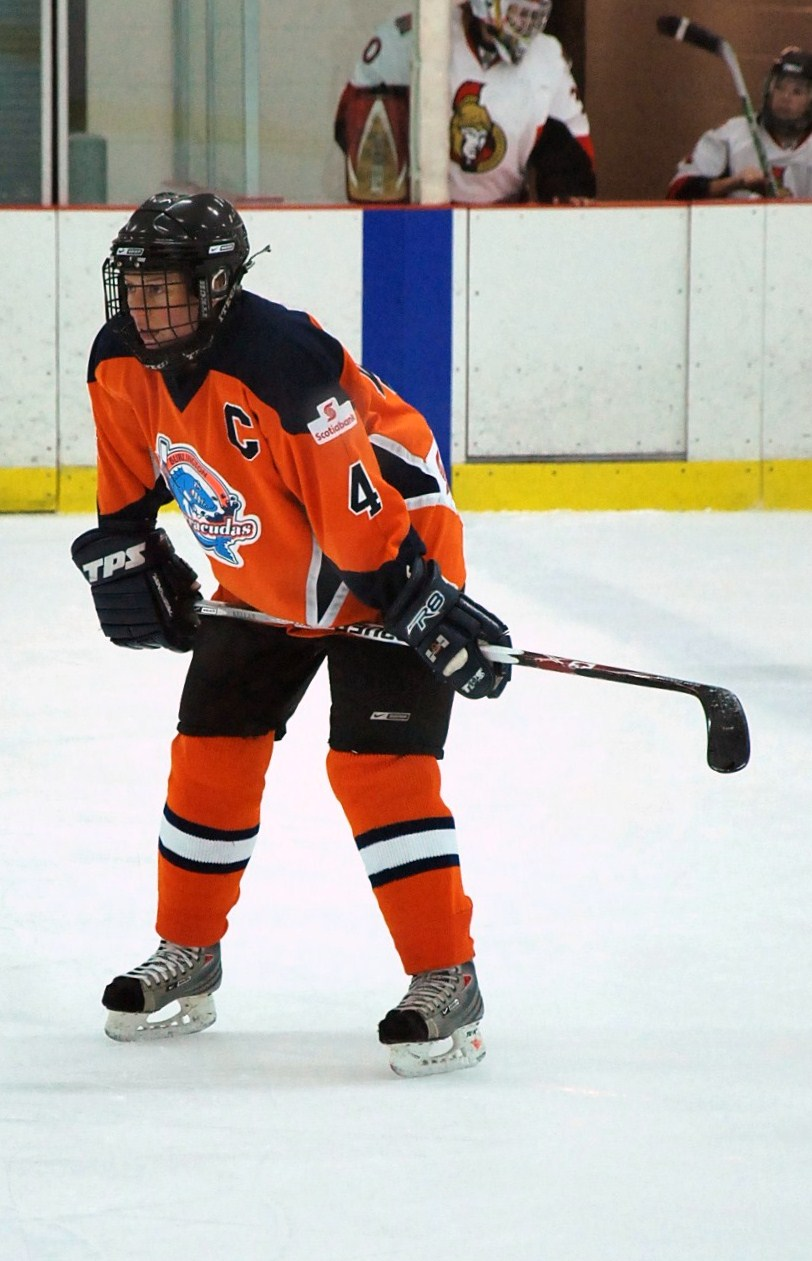
- Becky Kellar at Ottawa Senators games during the 2008/09 CWHL season
- Born: January 1, 1975 (age 51) Hagersville, Ontario, Canada
- Height: 5 ft 7 in (170 cm)
- Weight: 155 lb (70 kg; 11 st 1 lb)
- Position: Defence
- Shot: Left
- Played for: Burlington Barracudas (CWHL); Toronto Aeros (NWHL); Brown University (NCAA)
- National team: Canada
- Playing career: 1997–2010
Medal record
Women's ice hockey
Representing Canada
Olympic Games
Gold medal – first place	2002 Salt Lake City	Tournament
Gold medal – first place	2006 Torino	Tournament
Gold medal – first place	2010 Vancouver	Tournament
Silver medal – second place	1998 Nagano	Tournament
IIHF World Women's Championships
Gold medal – first place	1999 Finland	Tournament
Gold medal – first place	2000 Canada	Tournament
Gold medal – first place	2001 United States	Tournament
Gold medal – first place	2004 Canada	Tournament
Silver medal – second place	2005 Sweden	Tournament
Silver medal – second place	2008 China	Tournament
Silver medal – second place	2009 Finland	Tournament

Rebecca "Becky" Kellar (born January 1, 1975) is a retired ice hockey defender. She played for the Toronto Aeros and Oakville Ice in the NWHL, the Burlington Barracudas in the Canadian Women's Hockey League, and the Canadian national team.

Kellar played for the Canadian women's team at the 2006 Winter Olympics in Turin. She also participated in the 1998 Winter Olympics in Nagano as well as the 2002 Winter Olympics in Salt Lake City. She was named to the Canadian team for the 2010 Winter Olympics and was one of four Canadian women to participate in all four Olympic tournaments along with Hayley Wickenheiser, Jennifer Botterill and Jayna Hefford. Kellar was the oldest player in the 2010 gold medal game. She was the first player on the Canadian national women's hockey team to have children.

== Playing career ==
Kellar was born in Hagersville, Ontario, and played ringette as a child, before switching over to hockey. She competed for Team Ontario at the National Under 18 Championships in 1993. She led Team Ontario to the Gold Medal and was selected as the Most Valuable Player. Kellar played with the Beatrice Aeros in 1998 and participated in the championship game of the Esso Nationals, netting an assist.

She played for the Brown Bears women's ice hockey program at Brown University in Providence, Rhode Island from 1993 to 1997 and has an MBA from Wilfrid Laurier University. While at Brown, she played second base on the softball team. She was a First Team All-Ivy League selection at softball in 1995 and 1997. She was inducted into the Brown Athletics Hall of Fame in April 2005.

She later played for the Burlington Barracudas of the Canadian Women's Hockey League. In the 2007–08 and 2008–09 seasons, she was voted the CWHL Top Defender and a CWHL Central All-Star. On September 14, 2010, Hockey Canada announced that Kellar, along with three other players retired from international hockey.

Kellar is married and lives in Burlington, Ontario. She welcomed her first son, Owen, on October 22, 2004, and her second son, Zachary, on January 25, 2007.

== Career statistics ==
=== Regular season and playoffs ===
			Regular season					Playoffs
Season	Team	League	GP	G	A	Pts	PIM	GP	G	A	Pts	PIM
1993-94	Brown University	ECAC	25	9	4	23	—	—	—	—	—	—
1994-95	Brown University	ECAC	25	20	29	49	—	—	—	—	—	—
1995-96	Brown University	ECAC	25	10	18	28	—	—	—	—	—	—
1996-97	Brown University	ECAC	25	9	31	40	—	—	—	—	—	—
1998-99	Beatrice Aeros	NWHL	32	7	9	16	2	—	—	—	—	—
1999-2000	Beatrice Aeros	NWHL	30	4	14	18	33	—	—	—	—	—
2000-01	Beatrice Aeros	NWHL	30	4	16	20	12	6	1	3	4	0
2002-03	Beatrice Aeros	NWHL	29	8	17	25	24	1	0	0	0	0
2003-04	Toronto Aeros	NWHL	26	1	14	15	24	2	0	0	0	4
2004-05	Oakville Ice	NWHL	17	2	5	7	4	2	0	1	1	12
2005-06	Oakville Ice	NWHL	1	0	0	0	2	2	1	0	1	0
2007-08	Burlington Barracudas	CWHL	28	2	10	12	42	—	—	—	—	—
2008-09	Burlington Barracudas	CWHL	27	4	10	14	26	—	—	—	—	—
2010-11	Burlington Barracudas	CWHL	21	1	2	3	16	—	—	—	—	—

=== International ===
Year	Team	Event	Result	GP	G	A	Pts	PIM
1998	Canada	OG	2nd place, silver medalist(s)	6	1	2	3	2
1999	Canada	WC	1st place, gold medalist(s)	5	1	0	1	6
2000	Canada	WC	1st place, gold medalist(s)	5	2	2	4	0
2001	Canada	WC	1st place, gold medalist(s)	5	1	2	3	2
2002	Canada	OG	1st place, gold medalist(s)	4	0	1	1	6
2004	Canada	WC	1st place, gold medalist(s)	4	0	0	0	0
2005	Canada	WC	2nd place, silver medalist(s)	5	0	2	2	4
2006	Canada	OG	1st place, gold medalist(s)	5	0	1	1	2
2008	Canada	WC	2nd place, silver medalist(s)	5	1	4	5	0
2009	Canada	WC	2nd place, silver medalist(s)	5	0	0	0	4
2010	Canada	OG	1st place, gold medalist(s)	5	0	4	4	6

== Awards and honours ==
- CWHL Top Defender, 2007–08 and 2008–09
- CWHL First All-Star Team, 2008–09
- CWHL Central All-Stars, 2007–08
- 1996 ECAC All-Tournament team
- 1996 ECAC Honor Roll
