= 2009–10 CWHL season =

The 2009–10 CWHL season was the third season in the history of the Canadian Women's Hockey League. the Montreal Stars repeated as regular season champions for the third straight year. Sabrina Harbec of the Stars won the Angela James Bowl as the top scorer and was voted the league's most valuable player, the CWHL Top Forward and a CWHL First Team All-Star. Teammate Annie Guay was voted CWHL Top Defender while Laura Hosier was voted CWHL Top Goaltender. Danielle Blanchard was voted CWHL Outstanding Rookie.

== Exhibition games ==
The CWHL participated in a number of benefit games against NHL Alumni. Games were played on March 4 (Galt Street Arena, Cambridge), March 5 (Mountain Arena, Hamilton), March 6 (Hershey Centre, Mississauga) and March 7 (Niagara Falls Memorial Arena).

== Regular season ==
- During the season, Ashley Johnston of the Burlington Barracudas was the youngest Ontario player to play in the CWHL.

== Final standings ==
Note: GP = Games played, W = Wins, L = Losses, OTL = Overtime Losses, SOL = Shootout Losses, GF = Goals for, GA = Goals against, Pts = Points.

CWHL Division
No.	Team	GP	W	L	OTL	SOL	Pts	GF	GA
1	Montreal Stars	30	23	5	0	2	48	122	70
2	Mississauga Chiefs	30	22	7	0	1	45	94	57
3	Burlington Barracudas	30	19	8	0	3	41	94	80
4	Brampton Thunder	30	12	15	2	1	27	80	82
5	Vaughan Flames	30	9	20	0	1	19	78	115
6	Ottawa Senators	30	5	23	1	1	12	61	125

== Statistical leaders ==
=== Points (Angela James Bowl) ===
Player	Team	Games Played	Goals	Assists	Points	Penalty Minutes
Sabrina Harbec	Montreal Stars	29	15	40	55	34
Lindsay Vine	Burlington Barracudas	30	18	26	44	28
Noemie Marin	Montreal Stars	28	25	18	43	16
Lori Dupuis	Brampton Thunder	27	14	24	38	44
Annie Guay	Montreal Stars	26	8	30	38	26
Jana Harrigan	Burlington Barracudas	22	16	21	37	26
Sommer West	Mississauga Chiefs	29	11	24	35	68
Kelly Hart	Burlington Barracudas	30	10	24	34	20

- Stats do not include the Dec. 13, 2009 Mississauga-Vaughan game

=== Goals ===
Player	Team	Games Played	Goals
Noemie Marin	Montreal Stars	28	25
Lindsay Vine	Burlington Barracudas	30	18
Jana Harrigan	Burlington Barracudas	22	16
Rebecca Davies	Mississauga Chiefs	29	16
Donna Ringrose	Montreal Stars	28	15
Sabrina Harbec	Montreal Stars	29	15

=== Assists ===
Player	Team	Games Played	Assists
Sabrina Harbec	Montreal Stars	29	40
Annie Guay	Montreal Stars	26	30
Lindsay Vine	Burlington Barracudas	30	26
Lori Dupuis	Brampton Canadette-Thunder	27	24
Sommer West	Mississauga Chiefs	29	24
Kelly Hart	Burlington Barracudas	30	24
Jana Harrigan	Burlington Barracudas	22	21
Nathalie Déry	Montreal Stars	29	21

=== Penalty Minutes ===
Player	Team	Games Played	Penalty Minutes
Sommer West	Mississauga Chiefs	29	68
Jennifer Kirk	Brampton Canadette-Thunder	30	67
Kelly Stewart	Burlington Barracudas	28	58
Sharon Kelly	Ottawa Senators	30	58
Rebecca Davies	Mississauga Chiefs	29	56
Michelle Bonello	Vaughan Flames	26	50
Leslie Oles	Montreal Stars	28	50
Christin Powers	Ottawa Senators	26	46

== Awards and honours ==
- Most Valuable Player: Sabrina Harbec, Montreal
- Angela James Bowl: Top Scorer Sabrina Harbec, Montreal
- Outstanding Rookie: Danielle Blanchard, Vaughan

=== CWHL Top Players ===
- Top Forward: Sabrina Harbec, Montreal
- Top Defender: Annie Guay, Montreal
- Top Goaltender: Laura Hosier, Brampton

=== CWHL All-Stars ===
First Team All-Stars

- Goalie Laura Hosier, Brampton
- Defence Annie Guay, Montreal - unanimous
- Defence Michelle Bonello, Vaughan
- Forward Sabrina Harbec, Montreal - unanimous
- Forward Lindsay Vine, Burlington
- Forward Sommer West, Mississauga

Second Team All-Stars

- Goalie Sami Jo Small, Mississauga
- Defence Shannon Moulson, Mississauga
- Defence Bobbi Jo Slusar, Brampton
- Forward Noémie Marin, Montreal
- Forward Lori Dupuis, Brampton
- Forward Jana Harrigan, Burlington

=== CWHL All-Rookie Team ===
- Goalie Allison Cubberley, Burlington
- Defence Ashley Johnston, Burlington
- Defence Sharon Kelly, Ottawa
- Forward Danielle Blanchard, Vaughan
- Forward Donna Ringrose, Montreal
- Forward Nicole Tritter, Brampton

=== Monthly Top Scorers ===
- October: Christin Powers, Ottawa (6+6=12 points, 8 games)
- November: Sabrina Harbec, Montreal (6+18=24 points, 9 games)
- December: Sabrina Harbec, Montreal (3+7=10 points, 5 games)
- January: Lori Dupuis, Brampton (8+7=15 points, 9 games)
- February: Brianne Jenner, Burlington (4+3=7 points, 4 games)
- March: Nicole Tritter, Brampton (2+3=5 points, 3 games)

== Playoffs ==
- The Montreal Stars and Mississauga Chiefs qualified for the Clarkson Cup as they were the top two teams in the league. The four remaining teams competed in an elimination tournament. The winning team was the final team from the CWHL to qualify for the Clarkson Cup.

Series	Participants	Score
Semifinals	Brampton Thunder vs. Vaughan Flames	Brampton, 4-1
Semifinals	Burlington Barracudas vs. Ottawa Senators	Burlington, 4-3 (OT)
Finals	Brampton Thunder vs. Burlington Barracudas	Brampton, 2-1

== Clarkson Cup ==
On March 3, 2010, the city council of Richmond Hill, Ontario donated $10,000 to the CWHL so that it could host the Clarkson Cup on March 27 and 28 at the Elgin Barrow Arena in Richmond Hill.

- Semifinals

Date	Time	Participants	Score
March 27, 2010	12:00 pm	Brampton Thunder vs. Montreal Stars	Brampton, 3–2
March 27, 2010	16:00	Minnesota Whitecaps vs. Mississauga Chiefs	Minnesota, 3–0

- Finals

Date	Time	Participants	Score
March 28, 2010	15:00	Brampton Thunder vs. Minnesota Whitecaps	Minnesota, 4–0

Minnesota Whitecaps (WWHL) won the Clarkson Cup.

== See also ==
- Canadian Women's Hockey League
- Clarkson Cup
- 2010 Clarkson Cup
