= Lori Dupuis =

Canadian women's ice hockey player

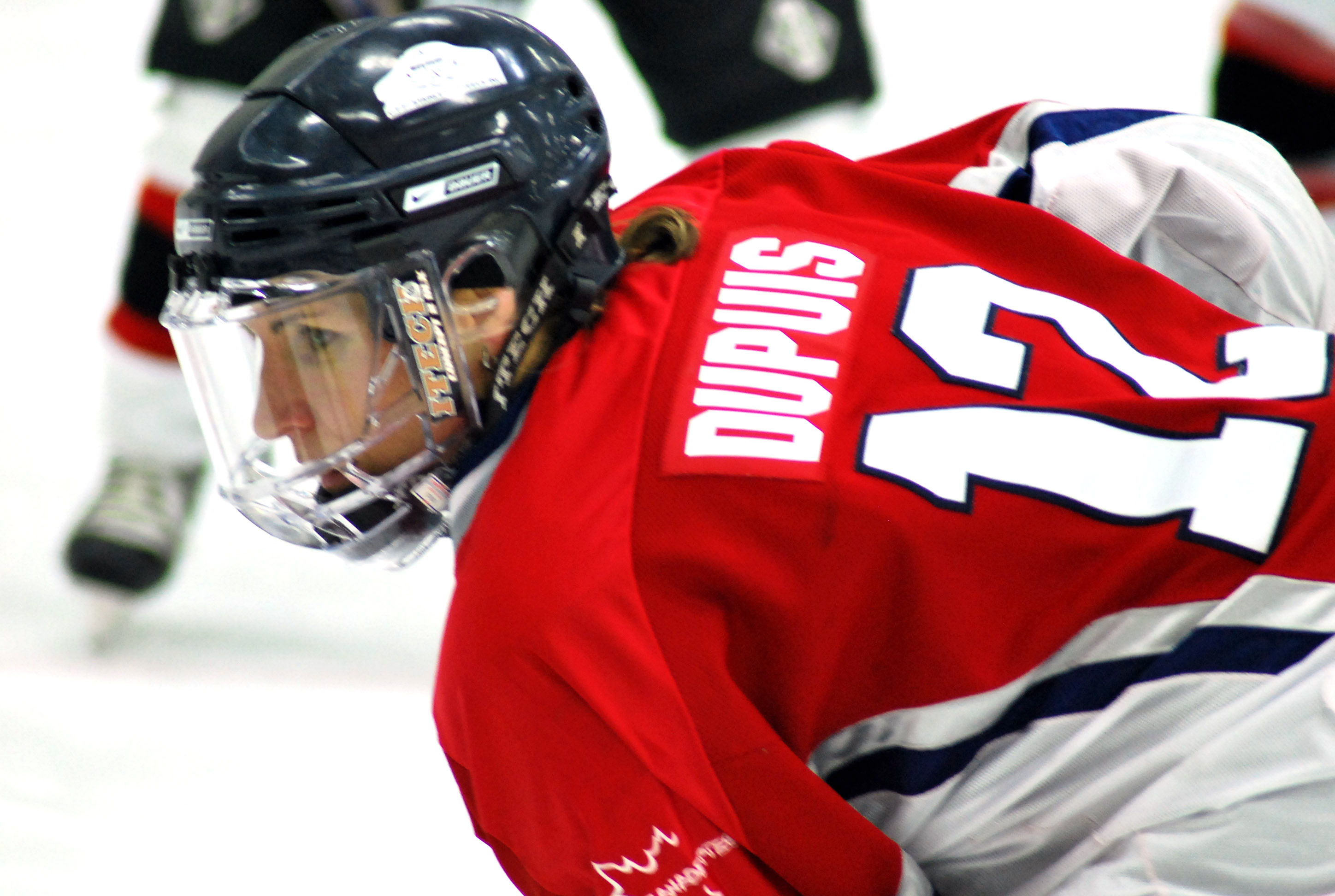
- Born: November 14, 1972 (age 53) Williamstown, Ontario, Canada
- Height: 5 ft 8 in (173 cm)
- Weight: 165 lb (75 kg; 11 st 11 lb)
- Position: Forward
- Shot: Left
- Played for: Brampton Thunder
- National team: Canada
- Playing career: 1995–2013
Medal record
Representing Canada
Women's ice hockey
Olympic Games
Gold medal – first place	2002 Salt Lake City	Tournament
Silver medal – second place	1998 Nagano	Tournament
IIHF World Women's Championships
Gold medal – first place	1997 Canada	Tournament
Gold medal – first place	1999 Finland	Tournament
Gold medal – first place	2000 Canada	Tournament

Lori Dupuis (born November 14, 1972) is a retired Canadian ice hockey forward. She played for the Brampton Thunder and the Canadian women's national ice hockey team, including at the 1998 and 2002 Winter Olympics.

== Playing career ==
Dupuis was born and raised just outside Cornwall, Ontario. She is a former member of the Cornwall Wolverines of the OWHA. She started with the Wolverines at the age of 10, and won Provincial "C" and "B" Championships. After playing minor ice hockey in Cornwall, Dupuis attended the University of Toronto, where she played with the Varsity Lady Blues from 1991 to 1997 and was nominated as female athlete of the year in 1996 and 1997. Dupuis was captain of the Lady Blues women's ice hockey team program from 1994 to 1996. During the 1992-93 season, she was the Blues Alternate Captain. In 1994-95, she was second in league scoring. In that same season, she was an OWIAA First Team All-Star, and a nominee for the U of T Female Athlete of the Year Award. In 1993-94 she was an OWIAA Second Team All-Star. In 1992-93 Dupuis was an OWIAA First Team All-Star and the Blues Alternate Captain.

=== Brampton Thunder ===
After University, Dupuis joined the Brampton Thunder of the National Women's Hockey League. She was named to the 1998-99 NWHL Western Division 2nd All-Star Team. During the 2000–01 NWHL season, Dupuis played with the Brampton Thunder and finished sixth in league scoring with 38 points. Dupuis continues to play for the Brampton Thunder, a team in the Canadian Women's Hockey League.

=== Hockey Canada ===
Dupuis joined Team Canada in the mid-1990s. In 1995 she was a member of Team Canada, winners of the Pacific Rim Tournament. She helped the team win world championships in 1997, 1999 and 2000. In 1998, she helped her team win the silver medal at the Olympic Winter Games in Nagano. The pinnacle of her career was Team Canada's gold medal win at the 2002 Winter Olympics in Salt Lake City.

== Personal ==
A graduate of General Vanier S.S. in Cornwall, Dupuis competed at OFSAA Provincial Championships for each of her five years. She is also a graduate of the University of Toronto (French and Geography). At one time, she ran a hockey school with Jayna Hefford. As of 2015, Dupuis' partner is former Canadian Women's Hockey League player Kristi Alcorn. They had a child that year.

== Career statistics ==
=== Regular season and playoffs ===
			Regular season					Playoffs
Season	Team	League	GP	G	A	Pts	PIM	GP	G	A	Pts	PIM
1991-92	University of Toronto	CIAU	—	—	—	—	—	—	—	—	—	—
1993-94	University of Toronto	CIAU	14	7	7	14	24	—	—	—	—	—
1994-95	University of Toronto	CIAU	15	17	19	36	18	—	—	—	—	—
1995-96	Toronto Red Wings	COWHL	14	5	4	9	15	—	—	—	—	—
1996-97	University of Toronto	CIAU	12	7	17	24	18	—	—	—	—	—
1996-97	Newtonbrook Panthers	COWHL	18	13	12	25	18	—	—	—	—	—
1998-99	Brampton Thunder	NWHL	22	15	20	35	18	—	—	—	—	—
1999-2000	Brampton Thunder	NWHL	31	25	15	40	28	—	—	—	—	—
2000-01	Brampton Thunder	NWHL	28	23	17	40	50	4	1	2	3	4
2002-03	Brampton Thunder	NWHL	28	13	17	30	42	—	—	—	—	—
2003-04	Brampton Thunder	NWHL	35	20	24	44	52	5	2	6	8	2
2004-05	Brampton Thunder	NWHL	9	6	9	15	14	—	—	—	—	—
2005-06	Brampton Thunder	NWHL	34	17	24	41	56	3	0	0	0	2
2007-08	Brampton Thunder	CWHL	25	17	12	29	18	—	—	—	—	—
2008-09	Brampton Thunder	CWHL	28	13	24	37	44	—	—	—	—	—
2010-11	Brampton Thunder	CWHL	27	9	14	23	28	3	0	3	3	16
2011-12	Brampton Thunder	CWHL	26	7	6	13	36	4	1	2	3	8
2012-13	Brampton Thunder	CWHL	24	3	7	10	32	3	0	0	0	4

=== International ===
Year	Team	Event	Result	GP	G	A	Pts	PIM
1997	Canada	WC	1st place, gold medalist(s)	5	2	4	6	8
1998	Canada	OG	2nd place, silver medalist(s)	6	2	1	3	6
1999	Canada	WC	1st place, gold medalist(s)	5	1	1	2	6
2000	Canada	WC	1st place, gold medalist(s)	5	1	2	3	0
2002	Canada	OG	1st place, gold medalist(s)	5	1	1	2	4

== Awards and honours ==
- Clarkson Cup Top Forward, 2010
- CWHL Second All-Star Team, 2009–10
- CWHL Championship Game MVP, 2008
- NWHL West Second All-Star Team, 1998–99
- 1994-95 OWIAA First Team All-Stars
- 1994-95 nominee for University of Toronto Female Athlete of the Year Award
- 1993-94 OWIAA Second Team All-Star
- 1992-93 OWIAA First Team All-Star
