= Laura Schuler =

Canadian ice hockey player and coach

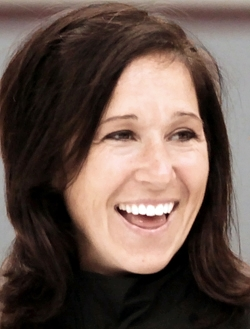

Current position
- Title: Head coach
- Team: Minnesota Duluth
- Conference: WCHA

Biographical details
- Born: December 3, 1970 (age 55); Scarborough, Ontario, Canada

Playing career
- 1989–1993: Northeastern
- 1993–1994: Scarborough Firefighters
- 1996–1996: Toronto Red Wings
- 1996–1997: Newtonbrook Panthers
- 1998–2000: Brampton Thunder
- Position: Forward

Coaching career (HC unless noted)
- 2004: UMass Boston
- 2004–2008: Northeastern
- 2008–2016: Minnesota Duluth (Assistant)
- 2016–2020: Dartmouth
- 2021–2024: Minnesota Duluth (Assistant)
- 2024–present: Minnesota Duluth
Medal record
Olympic Games
Silver medal – second place	1998 Nagano	Team
World Championships
Gold medal – first place	1990 Canada
Gold medal – first place	1992 Finland
Gold medal – first place	1997 Canada

Laura Lynne Schuler (born December 3, 1970) is a Canadian ice hockey coach for Minnesota Duluth of the WCHA and former player who was a member of the 1998 Canadian women's Olympic hockey team.

== Playing career ==
Schuler played one sport in high school. She was captain of the field hockey. She earned MVP awards in field hockey, ice hockey and soccer. Schuler won three Canadian national soccer championships with Scarborough United. Schuler began playing with the Toronto Aeros' youth organization when she was 11 years old in 1981. After three years with the Aeros, she played with the Scarborough Firefighters from 1984 to 1989. In 1994, Schuler joined the Toronto Red Wings.

=== Northeastern ===
In 1989, Schuler entered Northeastern University in Boston to pursue a bachelor's degree in cardiovascular health and exercise. As a rookie, she was the Huskies scoring leader in goals, assists, and total points. After the 90–91 season, she scored 20 goals and 13 assists. The following season, the Huskies had 20 wins and seven losses. Schuler accumulated 20 goals and 13 assists for 33 points. Once again, she led the team in goals, assists and points.

In 1991–92, Schuler was part of the Huskies third consecutive 20-win season (the Huskies went 20–5–2). Schuler had another season with 20 goals. For the year, she had 29 points. During her final year of 1992–93, she was named team captain. As she was the team leader in scoring with 16 goals and 20 assists, (for 36 points), she suffered a season-ending leg injury. The injury occurred with seven games remaining. For her career, her numbers with the Huskies included 64 goals, (fifth overall), 57 assists (ninth), and 121 points (eighth).

=== Toronto Lady Blues ===
After her time at Northeastern, Schuler played for the Toronto Varsity Blues women's ice hockey program. In the 1997 OWIAA semifinal, Schuler's hat trick led the Lady Blues to a 4-1 victory over the Guelph Gryphons. Schuler would also score a goal against York University goaltender Debra Ferguson in the 1997 OWIAA gold medal game.

=== Hockey Canada ===
Schuler joined the Canadian women's national team in its first season, 1990. She captured gold medals at World Championships in 1990, 1992, and 1997. Schuler also played in the 1995 and 1996 Pacific Rim Tournament. Her final major international tournament was the 1998 Winter Olympics where she suited up for six matches.

== Coaching career ==
In 2004, she became the head coach for the program at Northeastern University. From 1998 to 2000, she had coached the Stouffville Midget AA teams in Stouffville, Ontario from 1998 through 2000. In 2007–08, Schuler's Northeastern Huskies team had two members on the Hockey East All-Rookie team: Kristi Kehoe (led the team in scoring), and goaltender Leah Sulyma. In the summer of 2010, Schuler participated in the evaluation camp for the 2010–11 Canadian national women's team. She was a coach for Canada Red (the camp was divided into four teams, Red, White, Yellow, Blue). Schuler assisted head coach Ryan Walter for Team Canada at the 2010 Four Nations Cup.

Schuler was an assistant coach for the Minnesota Duluth Bulldogs women's ice hockey program from 2008 until 2016.

On April 22, 2016, Schuler was named head coach of the Dartmouth College women's ice hockey team.

On September 7, 2020, Schuler was named a volunteer advisor at Quinnipiac for the 2020–21 season.

On July 21, 2021, Minnesota Duluth announced that Schuler would be returning to the program as an assistant coach. On July 11, 2024, she was named the third head coach in the history of the Bulldogs women's ice hockey team.

== Career statistics ==
=== Regular season and playoffs ===
			Regular season
Season	Team	League	GP	G	A	Pts	PIM
1989–90	Northeastern	ECAC	21	8	15	23	—
1990–91	Northeastern	ECAC	27	20	13	33	—
1991–92	Northeastern	ECAC	27	20	9	29	—
1992–93	Northeastern	ECAC	24	16	20	36	—
1993–94	Scarborough Firefighters	COWHL	14	9	7	16	38
1995–96	Toronto Red Wings	COWHL	16	6	11	17	12
1996–97	Newtonbrook Panthers	COWHL	19	16	16	32	26
1998–99	Brampton Thunder	NWHL	14	6	10	16	10
1999–2000	Brampton Thunder	NWHL	25	9	9	18	41
NCAA totals			99	64	57	121	—
COWHL totals			49	31	34	65	76
NWHL totals			39	15	19	34	51

=== International ===
Year	Team	Event	Result	GP	G	A	Pts	PIM
1990	Canada	WC	1st place, gold medalist(s)	5	4	2	6	8
1992	Canada	WC	1st place, gold medalist(s)	5	1	2	3	4
1997	Canada	WC	1st place, gold medalist(s)	5	1	4	5	6
1998	Canada	OG	2nd place, silver medalist(s)	6	0	0	0	2
Senior totals				21	6	8	14	22

== Coaching record ==
Record table
Season	Team	Overall	Conference	Standing	Postseason
UMass Boston (ECAC East) (2003–2004)
2003–04	UMass Boston	13–12–1		6th	
UMass Boston:		13–12–1			
Northeastern (Hockey East) (2004–2008)
2004–05	Northeastern	3–25–4	2–15–3	6th	
2005–06	Northeastern	8–24–1	6–14–1	7th	
2006–07	Northeastern	5–26–2	4–15–2	7th	
2007–08	Northeastern	7–24–3	6–14–1	6th	
Northeastern:		23–99–10	18–58–7		
Dartmouth (ECAC) (2016–2020)
2016–17	Dartmouth	7–21–0	5–17–0	11th	
2018–19	Dartmouth	5–19–3	4–16–2	10th	
2019–20	Dartmouth	7–19–3	4–15–3	10th	
Dartmouth:		19–59–6	13–48–5		
Minnesota Duluth (WCHA) (2024–present)
2024–25	Minnesota Duluth				
Minnesota Duluth:					
Total:		55–170–17	31–106–12		
National champion Postseason invitational champion Conference regular season champion Conference regular season and conference tournament champion Division regular season champion Division regular season and conference tournament champion Conference tournament champion

== Awards and honours ==
- Ontario Athletic Union, All-Conference, 1996
- Ontario Athletic Union, All-Conference in both 1997
- Eastern College Athletic Conference Coach of the Year Award in 2004
- Northeastern University's Sports Hall of Fame (inducted in 2004)
