= Lisa-Marie Breton =

Canadian ice hockey player and coach

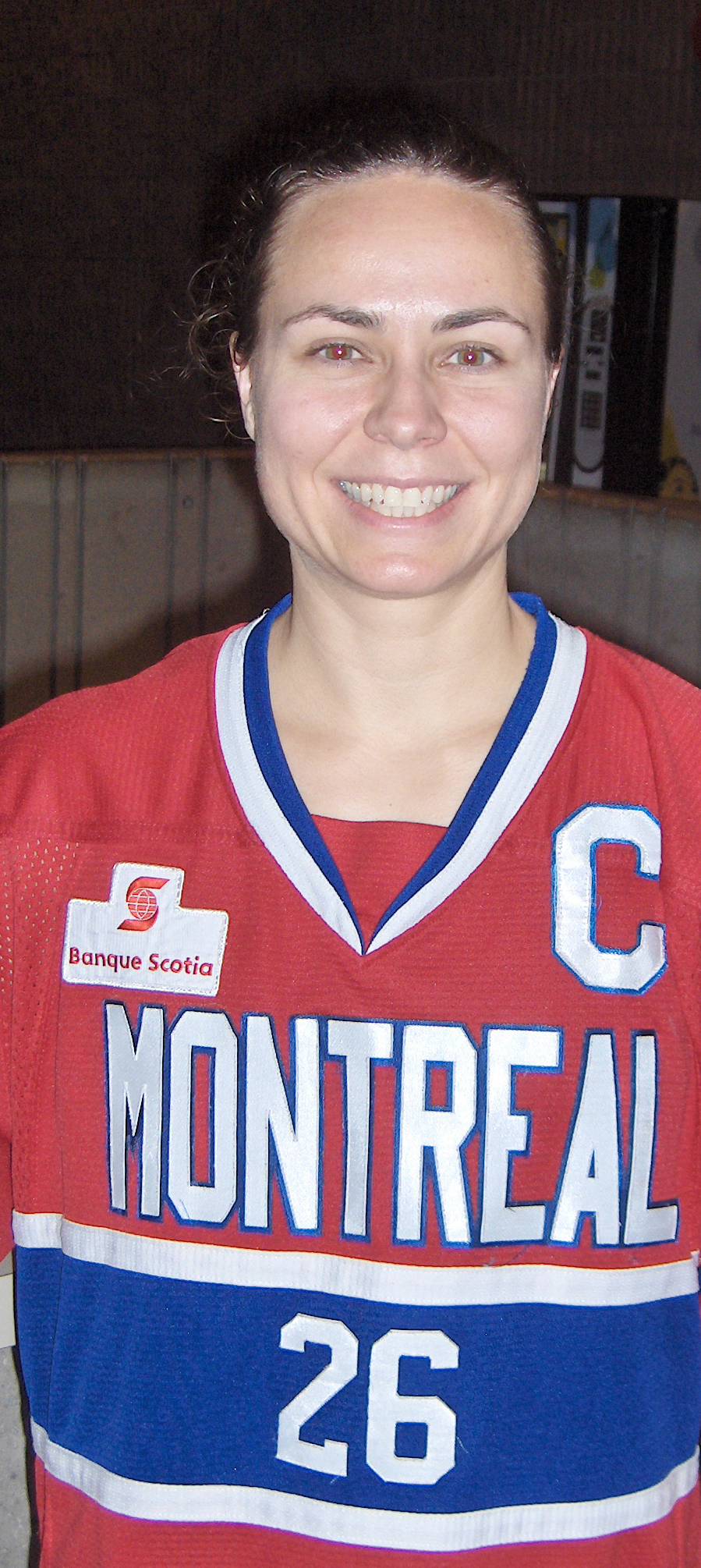
- Breton with the Montreal Stars in December 2011
- Born: August 3, 1977 (age 49) St-Zacharie, Quebec, Canada
- Height: 5 ft 3 in (160 cm)
- Weight: 146 lb (66 kg; 10 st 6 lb)
- Position: Forward
- Shot: Left
- Played for: Concordia Stingers; Avalanche du Québec; Montreal Axion; Stars de Montréal
- Current RSEQ coach: Concordia Stingers
- Coached for: Canadiennes de Montréal
- Playing career: 1997–2015
- Coaching career: 2002–present
Medal record
Representing Canada
Women's inline hockey
FIRS World Championship
Gold medal – first place	2005 France

Lisa-Marie Breton-Lebreux (born August 3, 1977) is a Canadian ice hockey coach and former player. She played for the Montréal Wingstar / Montréal Axion, Québec Avalanche, and Montréal Stars / Montréal Canadiennes. She was a co-founder of the Canadian Women's Hockey League in 2007.

She played her college ice hockey career with Concordia University in Montréal. She was a two-time Abby Hoffman Cup national champion with Hockey Québec and a three-time Clarkson Cup champion as a player with the Montréal Stars.

She played inline hockey at the international level as a member of the Canadian women's national inline hockey team that captured gold at the 2005 FIRS Inline Hockey World Championships in Paris.

== Playing career ==
Breton began playing minor ice hockey at age six.

She attended Cégep de Trois-Rivières and played three seasons with the UQTR Patriotes of the Université du Québec à Trois-Rivières (UQTR) as part of a league made up of other cégeps and universities throughout the province. Breton was invited to the 2000–01 Hockey Canada National Development Camp.

=== Team Quebec ===
At fifteen years of age, she was recruited by Team Quebec at the junior level and played in the first ever National Junior Championship for hockey in 1993. The team won a silver medal in a loss to Team Ontario. Breton represented Team Quebec in numerous tournaments. In 2000, she played with Kim St. Pierre and Nancy Drolet as part of Team Quebec at the 2000 Esso Nationals. Her club team, the Montreal Axion, earned the right to represent Quebec as the club competed at the 2005 Esso Nationals.

=== Concordia Stingers ===
Breton joined Concordia for the 1997–98 season, and went to five National championships with the Stingers. In her rookie year, the CIS recognized women's hockey. The Stingers were granted their first national championship, which was held at Concordia. Breton was part of the squad that won the 1999 National Championship, but her club was beaten in the 2000 semi-finals by the University of Alberta by a 4-3 tally. That year, the Stingers took third place. In the 2000-01 season, Breton led the Quebec Student Sports Federation (QSSF) with eight goals and six assists in just six games.

Breton was an All-Canadian in 2000-01 season with the Concordia University Stingers, a team that she captained during her last two seasons. In her university hockey career, she participated in five Canadian Interuniversity Sport Championship finals.

=== NWHL ===
Breton played the 2002–03 season with the Avalanche du Québec (Quebec Avalanche) of the NWHL.

In 2006, Breton was part of the Montreal Axion club that beat the Brampton Thunder by a 1-0 mark to claim the NWHL championship Cup. Breton scored the game-winning goal. The stick she used to score the game-winning goal was given to the Hockey Hall of Fame.

=== CWHL ===
Breton was one of the six founders of the Canadian Women's Hockey League, alongside Jennifer Botterill, Allyson Fox, Kathleen Kauth, Kim McCullough, and Sami Jo Small. The players worked with a group of volunteer business people to form the CWHL by following the example of the National Lacrosse League. The league would be responsible for all travel, ice rental and uniform costs, plus some equipment. Breton would become the general manager and head of public relations for the Stars de Montréal (Montreal Stars). On March 19, 2009, Breton was part of the Stars team that played for the Clarkson Cup for the first time. Montreal beat the Minnesota Whitecaps to claim the Cup. Former Canadian Governor General Adrienne Clarkson was on hand to present the trophy to team captain Breton.

Breton was part of an initiative to raise money for breast cancer research. On January 29, 2011, the Montreal Stars wore pink jerseys as they played the Boston Blades as part of a fundraiser. Breton's mother, Johanne Breton, survived the disease.

During the 2010-11 season, Breton scored 8 goals and added 3 assists. She captained the Stars to their second Clarkson Cup championship win in three years. On January 11, 2014, Breton, a CWHL co-founder registered the 100th point of her career.

On December 13, 2014, Breton was selected to participate in the 1st Canadian Women's Hockey League All-Star Game. Suiting up for Team Red, she would score a goal in the third period on Team White's Geneviève Lacasse with Blake Bolden and Ann-Sophie Bettez assisting on said goal.

The final goal of her CWHL career took place in a 5–2 win against the Calgary Inferno on February 1, 2015. Scoring a third period goal against Camille Trautman, the assists on said goal were credited to Fannie Desforges and Chelsey Saunders.

== Coaching & staff career ==
She has served as the strength and conditioning coach for Concordia Stingers varsity teams since the 2000s.

Breton joined the coaching team of head coach Les Lawton as an assistant coach to the Concordia Stingers women's ice hockey program in the 2002–03 season. Her Montreal Stars teammate, Nathalie Déry, was an assistant coach for the Stingers alongside Breton from the 2009–10 season through the 2011–12 season.

== Career statistics ==
Biographical information and career statistics from Eliteprospects.com, or Eurohockey.com, or The Internet Hockey Database

=== Regular season and playoffs ===
Note: Blank cells indicate unavailable statistics. Italic indicates totals calculated from incomplete statistics.

			Regular season					Playoffs
Season	Team	League	GP	G	A	Pts	PIM	GP	G	A	Pts	PIM
1997–98	Concordia Stingers	QSSF						–	–	–	–	—
1998–99	Concordia Stingers	QSSF						–	–	–	–	—
1999-2000	Concordia Stingers	QSSF						–	–	–	–	—
2000–01	Concordia Stingers	QSSF						–	–	–	–	—
2001–02	Concordia Stingers	QSSF						–	–	–	–	—
2002–03	Quebec Avalanche	NWHL	36	14	10	24	44	–	–	–	–	—
2003–04	Montreal Axion	NWHL	39	21	13	34	46	–	–	–	–	—
2004–05	Montreal Axion	NWHL	32	16	19	35	61	–	–	–	–	—
2005–06	Montreal Axion	NWHL	35	16	23	39	62	3	2	1	3	4
2007–08	Montreal Stars	CWHL	25	11	21	32	58	2	0	2	2	2
2008–09	Montreal Stars	CWHL	26	9	11	20	50
2009–10	Montreal Stars	CWHL	26	10	14	24	22
2010–11	Montreal Stars	CWHL	29	8	3	11	38	4	0	0	0	2
2011–12	Montreal Stars	CWHL	24	2	7	9	14	4	0	2	2	2
2012–13	Montreal Stars	CWHL	19	0	1	1	20	4	0	1	1	2
2013–14	Montreal Stars	CWHL	10	1	1	2	2	–	–	–	–	—
2014–15	Montreal Stars	CWHL	20	3	1	4	4	3	0	0	0	0
CIAU totals			139			143		–	–	–	–	–
NWHL totals			142	67	65	132	213	3	2	1	3	4
CWHL totals			179	44	59	103	208	17	0	2	5	8

== Awards and honours ==
Award	Year
Abby Hoffman Cup	1999, 2002
Clarkson Cup	2009, 2011, 2012
NWHL Champions Cup	2005-06
CWHL Humanitarian Award	2016
Most Sportsmanlike, National Championships	2002, 2003
Isobel Gathorne-Hardy Award	2014
QSSF All-Star Second Team	1999-2000, 2001–02
Concordia University Fittest Female Athlete	1998-99, 1999-2000, 2000-01, 2001-02
CIAU All-Canadian First Team	2000–01
QSSF All-Star First Team	2000–01
Sally Kemp Award; Concordia University Female Athlete of the Year	2000–01
Concordia Sports Hall of Fame, Athlete	2018

International
Award	Year
FIRS Inline Hockey World Championship Gold Medal	2005

== Personal life ==
Breton graduated from Concordia University with a BA in sociology. She is also the strength and conditioning coach for the men and women's rugby, women's soccer and women's hockey team.
