= Esso women's hockey nationals =

Hockey championship

The Abby Hoffman Cup
- Sport: Ice hockey
- Awarded for: Hockey Canada's women's national champions
- Country: Canada

History
- First award: 1982
- Editions: 27
- Final award: 2008
- First winner: Agincourt Canadians
- Most wins: Team Québec (5); Toronto Aeros (5)
- Most recent: Mississauga Chiefs

Hockey Canada's Women's National Championship for the Abby Hoffman Cup, sometimes known as the Esso Women's Nationals for sponsorship reasons, was a senior ice hockey championship from 1982 to 2008. The first edition was hosted in Brantford, Ontario from 1-4 April 1982 (originally known as the Shoppers Drug Mart Women's Nationals).

The competition typically featured nine or ten teams, mostly the provincial champions but also sometimes provincial all-star teams or a local host team. The winners won the Abby Hoffman Cup with gold medals, the runners up won the Fran Rider Cup with silver medals, and the third-place team won the Maureen McTeer Trophy with bronze medals. The Abby Hoffman Cup was donated by the Ontario Women's Hockey Association.

From 1982 to 2003, the teams were split into two somewhat even groups for round-robin play before the knockout games and the ranking or medal games. From 2004 to 2007, the teams were split into two distinct groups from which all five Pool A teams advanced to the knockout phase with only the Pool B winners. In 2008, the last year for the competition, the teams were again slit into two distinct groups, but only the four Pool A teams played for medals (CWHL and WWHL teams) while the four Pool B teams played for a B title.

== History ==
Since the split between the National Women's Hockey League and the Western Women's Hockey League in 2004, this was the only event in the professional women's hockey calendar that saw teams from the two leagues play against each other. Although an agreement between the NWHL and the WWHL was reached in 2006 to merge the two leagues (wherein the latter would be absorbed as a separate division of the former), difficulty in setting up the Nationals alongside an interlocking playoff format prevented the merger from taking place - the Nationals eventually would take place mere days after the WWHL playoffs and before the NWHL playoffs.

With the collapse of the NWHL soon after and the establishment of the Canadian Women's Hockey League in Eastern Canada, the Esso Nationals, which will also serve as a playoff of sorts between the WWHL and CWHL, received a format overhaul in 2008, in which the top two teams from the WWHL (representing British Columbia, Alberta, and Saskatchewan) and the top two teams from the CWHL (representing Ontario and Quebec) automatically qualified for the event. Teams representing the provinces without teams in either league filled out the remainder of the field, due to Hockey Canada requirements that every province be represented. The Abby Hoffman Cup was awarded to both the club pool and the team pool champions. Similarly, the Fran Rider Cup and the Maureen McTeer Trophy (the trophies awarded for the silver and bronze medalists at the Esso Nationals) were awarded in both the club and team pool tournaments.

To level the playing field (which in recent years had been dominated by club teams) for 2008, the four club teams played in a separate tournament from the four all-star teams (and thus two championships were awarded at the Esso Nationals), with the intent that the club pool (with the Clarkson Cup as its championship) would be splintered off into its own tournament at some point in the future. The 2008 tournament also saw the first American team to qualify, with the Minnesota Whitecaps joining the Calgary Oval X-Treme in representing the WWHL in the club pool. The format was the same for both the club and team tournaments: after the four teams played a single round robin pool, the four teams were seeded based on their standings and played a single-elimination tournament for the championship.

This arrangement had lasted for only one year; in 2009, the dispute between Clarkson and the Clarkson Cup's artists was settled, and a new championship, the National Canadian Women's Hockey Championship, was created for the professional teams, under the same format. However, this was not without cost as Hockey Canada elected to discontinue the Esso Women's Nationals in favour of the Esso Cup, a new national female midget 'AAA' championship.

== Past winners ==
Season	Winners	Score	Runners-up	MVP	Venue	Third place
1981–82	Agincourt Canadians; Ontario	3-2	Edmonton Chimos	Dawn McGuire	Brantford, Ontario	Titan de Montréal
1982-83	Burlington Ladies; Ontario	6-3	Edmonton Chimos	Barb Nugent	Brantford, Ontario	Maidstone Saskies
1983-84	Edmonton Chimos; Alberta	5-4	St-Hyacinthe	Shirley Cameron	Spruce Grove, Alberta	Hamilton Golden Hawks (COWHL)
1984-85	Edmonton Chimos; Alberta	4-3	Hamilton Golden Hawks (COWHL)	Angela James	Summerside, Prince Edward Island	Belvederes de Montréal
1985-86	Hamilton Golden Hawks (COWHL); Ontario	7-2	Maidstone Saskies	Linda DeAngelis	North Battleford, Saskatchewan	Edmonton Chimos
1986-87	Hamilton Golden Hawks (COWHL); Ontario	3-2	Edmonton Chimos	Angela James	Riverview, New Brunswick	Maidstone Saskies
1987-88	Sherbrooke Christin Autos; Quebec	4-3	Edmonton Chimos	France St-Louis	Burlington, Ontario	Hamilton Golden Hawks (COWHL)
1988-89	Sherbrooke Christin Autos; Quebec	4-3	North York Aeros (COWHL)	Tammy Bezaire	Coquitlam, British Columbia	Edmonton Chimos
1989-90	Sherbrooke Christin Autos; Quebec	5-1	Edmonton Chimos	France St-Louis	Lloydminster, Saskatchewan	North York Aeros (COWHL)
1990-91	North York Aeros (COWHL); Ontario	1-0	Sherbrooke Christin Autos	France St-Louis	Verdun, Quebec	Edmonton Chimos
1991-92	Edmonton Chimos; Alberta	4-0	North York Aeros (COWHL)		Edmonton, Alberta	Sherbrooke Christin Autos
1992-93	North York Aeros (COWHL); Ontario	4-3	Edmonton Chimos	Jane Lagacé	Ottawa, Ontario	Repentigny
1993-94	Équipe du Québec; Quebec	5-2	Edmonton Chimos		Winnipeg, Manitoba	North York Aeros (COWHL)
1994-95	Équipe du Québec; Quebec	5-2	Maritime Sport Blades	Stacy Wilson	Summerside, Prince Edward Island	Calgary Classics
1995-96	Équipe du Québec; Quebec	3-2	North York Aeros (COWHL)	Hayley Wickenheiser	Moncton, New Brunswick	Maritime Sport Blades
1996-97	Edmonton Chimos; Alberta	3-2	Équipe du Québec	France St-Louis	Richmond, British Columbia	North York Aeros (COWHL)
1997-98	Calgary Oval X-Treme; Alberta	3-2	North York Aeros (COWHL)	France St-Louis	Calgary, Alberta	Équipe du Québec
1998-99	Équipe du Québec; Quebec	4-2	Calgary Oval X-Treme	Hayley Wickenheiser	Mississauga, Ontario	North York Aeros (NWHL)
1999-2000	North York Aeros (NWHL); Ontario	2-1	Équipe du Québec	Hayley Wickenheiser	Sydney, Nova Scotia	Calgary Oval X-Treme
2000-01	Calgary Oval X-Treme; Alberta	1-0	Équipe du Québec	Caroline Ouellette	Summerside, Prince Edward Island	North York Aeros (NWHL)
2001-02	Équipe du Québec; Quebec	1-0	North York Aeros (NWHL)	Kim St-Pierre	Arnprior, Ontario and Renfrew, Ontario	Brampton Thunder (NWHL)
2002-03	Calgary Oval X-Treme (NWHL); Alberta	6-3	Brampton Thunder (NWHL)	Danielle Goyette	Saskatoon, Saskatchewan	Équipe du Québec
2003-04	Toronto Aeros (NWHL); Ontario	2-1	Calgary Oval X-Treme (NWHL)	Hayley Wickenheiser	Sherwood Park, Alberta	Edmonton Chimos (NWHL)
2004-05	Toronto Aeros (NWHL); Ontario	2-1	Brampton Thunder (NWHL)	Cheryl Pounder	Sarnia, Ontario	Montreal Axion (NWHL)
2005-06	Brampton Thunder (NWHL); Ontario	2-1	Montreal Axion (NWHL)	Annie Desrosiers	Sydney, Nova Scotia	Calgary Oval X-Treme (WWHL)
2006-07	Calgary Oval X-Treme (WWHL); Alberta	3-0	Etobicoke Dolphins (NWHL)	Hayley Wickenheiser	Salmon Arm, British Columbia	Mississauga Aeros (NWHL)
2007-08	Mississauga Chiefs (CWHL); Ontario	3-2	Brampton Canadette-Thunder (CWHL)	Hayley Wickenheiser	Charlottetown, Prince Edward Island	Calgary Oval X-Treme (WWHL)

== Game details ==
- On March 22, 1998, Dana Antal scored at 5:31 of a 10-minute overtime period on a pass from Jennifer Botterill as Team Alberta (represented by the Calgary Oval X-Treme) defeated Team Ontario (represented by the Beatrice Aeros) by a 3-2 mark to win the Esso Nationals.
- The Calgary Oval X-Treme (Team Alberta) and the Brampton Thunder (Team Ontario) competed in the 2003 Esso Women's National Hockey Championship. Team Alberta won by a score of 6-3 in front of over 1,100 fans at Saskatchewan Place. Samantha Holmes scored twice while Colleen Sostorics and Delaney Collins each contributed two assists. Team Alberta outscored their opponents in the tournament 46 to 10. With the win, Team Alberta was awarded the Abby Hoffman Cup.

== Awards and honors ==
- 2006 Top Forward: Jayna Hefford (Team Ontario)
- 2006 Top Goaltender: Charline Labonté (Team Quebec)
- 2006 Tournament MVP: Annie Durosiers (Team Quebec)
- 2007 Tournament MVP (Pool A): Hayley Wickenheiser (Team Alberta)
- 2007 Top Defender (Pool A): Cheryl Pounder (Team Ontario)
- 2007 Top goaltender (Pool A): Desirae Clark (Team BC)
- 2007 Top Forward (Pool A): Gina Kingsbury (Team Alberta)
- 2007 Tournament MVP (Pool B): Karen Thatcher (Team BC)
- 2007 Top Defender (Pool B): Melissa Coulombe (Team Manitoba)
- 2007 Top goaltender (Pool B): Kenzie Waterstreet (Team BC - Host Team)
- 2007 Top Forward (Pool B): Karen Thatcher (Team BC)
- 2007 Mickey Walker – Most Sportsmanlike Player – Jennifer Sullivan (PEI)
- 2007 Most Sportsmanlike Team – New Brunswick

=== Players of the game ===
- 2003 Gold Medal Game, Dana Antal, Oval X-Treme (Team Alberta)
- 2003 Gold Medal Game, Jayna Hefford, Brampton Thunder (Team Ontario)
- 2006 Gold Medal Game, Kristie Zamora, Brampton Thunder (Team Ontario)
- 2006 Gold Medal Game, Charline Labonte, Montreal Axion (Team Quebec)

== See also ==
- Esso Cup
