= 2006–07 NWHL season =

== Inefficient NWHL Management controversy ==
- February 10, 2007: In a game against the Brampton Thunder, the game ended in controversy. The Montreal Axion had a 2–1 lead in the third period. Jesse Scanzano scored two goals with assists going to Annie Derossiers, Cathy Chartrand and Melissa Roy. Brampton tied the game and Jesse Scanzanao missed an open net to put the game away. The teams ended up going to overtime. Annie Derossiers took a penalty at the 3:21 mark in overtime. The game would be settled in a shootout. Annie Derossiers left the penalty box prior to the shootout commencing and took the first shot for the Axion. This violated NWHL rules, as league rules state that any player serving a penalty at the end of overtime is to remain in the penalty box and would be unavailable for the shootout. The coaching staff and players of the Thunder protested as Montreal would win the game in the shootout.
- The second game of the series against Brampton would also violate the policy, rules and protocol that were set by the NWHL. The Thunder were leading 5 – 2 when the game ended due to curfew with 2:04 remaining in the contest. The game was forced to end as the Axion did not book enough ice time. Public skating had to take place and the game was not in accordance with league rules (which state that a minimum of three hours ice time is required).

== Final standings ==
In the last year of the National Women's Hockey League, several game sheets, results and totals are missing from the league records database (the only known database of NWHL records that has been shared with the Hockey Hall of Fame). Each team played 36 regular-season games from September 16, 2006 to February 25, 2007.

Two games were forfeit by the Quebec Avalanche: the January 27–28 weekend away games against the Etobicoke Dolphins and Mississauga Aeros. Both games were counted as 1–0 victories in favour of the home teams.

Of the 126 scheduled games (including two forfeit games in January), final scores are missing from the following five games: Dec. 17 (Etobicoke at Montreal), Jan. 25 (Quebec at Montreal), Feb. 4 (Oakville at Montreal), Feb. 17 (Quebec at Etobicoke), and Feb. 25 (Etobicoke at Montreal).

Note: GP = Games played, W = Wins, L = Losses, OTL = Overtime losses, SOL = Shootout losses, Pts = Points.

NWHL
No.	Team	GP	W	L	OTL	SOL	Pts	Unknown
1	Mississauga Aeros	36	28	7	0	1	57	–
2	Etobicoke Dolphins	36	23	5	3	2	51	Unk. results 12/17, 2/17 and 2/25
3	Brampton Thunder	36	20	12	0	4	44	–
4	Montreal Axion	36	20	12	0	0	40	Unk. results 12/17, 1/25, 2/4 and 2/25
5	Oakville Ice	36	17	15	1	2	37	Unk. result 2/4
6	Quebec Avalanche	36	6	24	2	2	16	Unk. results 1/25 and 2/17
7	Ottawa Raiders	36	7	28	0	1	15	–

=== Scoring leaders ===
Jayna Hefford won the scoring title with 40 goals and at least 30 assists. The NWHL 2006–07 totals are missing records from several games, specifically Dec. 17 (Etobicoke at Montréal), Jan. 20 (Mississauga at Etobicoke), Jan. 25 (Québec at Montréal), Feb. 4 (Oakville at Montréal), Feb. 17 (Québec at Etobicoke), Feb. 25 (Mississauga at Ottawa), Feb. 25 (Etobicoke at Montréal). The 2006–07 totals are also missing partial records from Dec. 16 (Mississauga at Brampton) and Feb. 11 (Brampton at Montréal).

Player	Team	Goals	Assists	Points
Jayna Hefford	Brampton	40	30	70

== Championship ==
- Brampton Thunder 4, Montreal Axion 0

The Brampton Thunder won the Championship of the NWHL.

== See also ==
- National Women's Hockey League (1999–2007) (NWHL)
