= 1998–99 NWHL season =

The 1998–99 NWHL season was the first season of the National Women's Hockey League.

== 1998–99 ==
=== Final standings ===
Note: GP = Games played, W = Wins, L = Losses, T = Ties, GF = Goals for, GA = Goals against, Pts = Points.

Eastern Division
No.	Team	GP	W	L	T	GF	GA	Pts
1	Bonaventure Wingstar	34	13	16	5	104	91	31
2	Montreal Jofa Titan	34	12	17	5	88	109	29
3	NCCP Raiders	34	9	19	6	61	114	24
4	Laval Le Mistral	34	9	21	4	78	144	22

Western Division
No.	Team	GP	W	L	T	GF	GA	Pts
1	Beatrice Aeros	40	37	2	1	189	39	75
2	Brampton Thunder	40	30	7	3	203	76	63
3	Mississauga Chiefs	40	23	15	2	117	75	48
4	Scarborough Sting	40	1	37	2	32	224	4

=== MVP of NWHL Western Division ===
- ---Team: ----- Most Valuable Defense ---- Most Valuable Forward
- Beatrice Aeros ----- Becky Kellar ---- Angela James
- Brampton Thunder ---- Sue Merz ------- Jayna Hefford
- Mississauga Chiefs --Nathalie Rivard ---Andria Hunter
- Scarborough Sting -- Cassandra Turner --- Michelle Steele

== Playoffs ==
=== First round ===
==== Eastern Division ====
- April 10, 1999: Montreal Jofa-Titan 3 at NCCP Raiders 1
- April 11, 1999: NCCP Raiders 4 at Montreal Jofa-Titan 4

Montreal Jofa-Titan wins 2 games semi-final 3 points to 1

- April 10, 1999: Bonaventure Wingstar 4 at Laval Le Mistral 2
- April 11, 1999: Laval Le Mistral 3 at Bonaventure Wingstar 8

Bonaventure Wingstar wins 2 game semi-final

===== Eastern Division Finals =====
- April 17, 1999: Bonaventure Wingstar 5 at Montreal Jofa-Titan 1
- April 18, 1999: Montreal Jofa-Titan 2 at Bonaventure Wingstar 2

Bonaventure Wingstar wins in total goals.

==== Western Division ====
- March 17, 1999: Mississauga Chiefs 3 at Brampton Thunder 5
- March 23, 1999: Brampton Thunder 2 at Mississauga Chiefs 1

Brampton Thunder wins best of 3 series 2-0.

=== Second round ===
April 23, 1999

- 18:15 hrs: Mississauga Chiefs 2 Bonaventure Wingstar 6
- 20:10 hrs: Montreal Jofa-Titan 2 @ Brampton Thunder 5

April 24, 1999

- 10:40 hrs: Montreal Jofa-Titan 2 Mississauga Chiefs 1
- 12:50 hrs: Brampton Thunder 6 Bonaventure Wingstar 2
- 17:50 hrs: Bonaventure Wingstar 4 Montreal Jofa-Titan 1
- 19:30 hrs: Brampton Thunder 2 Mississauga Chiefs 1

=== Final Round ===
April 25

- 11:15 hrs: Bronze Medal Game

Mississauga Chiefs 2 Montreal Jofa-Titan 0

- 13:30 hres Gold Medal Game

Bonaventure Wingstar 2 Brampton Thunder 5

- Gold Medal: Brampton Thunder
- Silver Medal: Bonaventure Wingstar
- Bronze Medal: Mississauga Chiefs

=== Award and honour for playoffs ===
- MVP Bonaventure Wingstar: Josee Cholette
- MVP Mississauga Chiefs: Andria Hunter
- MVP Montreal Jofa-Titan: Mai Lan Le

== Scoring 20 leaders ==
Player	Teams	Games	Goals	Assists	Points	Penalty
Stephanie Boyd	Brampton Thunder	38	21	40	61	32
Caroline Ouellette	Bonaventure Wingstar	27	32	38	60	6
Jeanine Sobek	Brampton Thunder	40	21	36	57	20
Angela James	Beatrice Aeros	31	36	19	55	47
Jayna Hefford	Brampton Thunder	27	34	19	53	30
Andria Hunter	Mississauga Chiefs	40	20	21	41	2
Annie Desrosiers	Laval Le Mistral	32	28	12	40	40
Vicky Sunohara	Brampton Thunder	24	22	18	40	18
Karen Nystrom	Brampton Thunder	25	23	14	37	38
Amanda Benoit	Beatrice Aeros	30	16	20	36	16
Cindy Cryderman	Beatrice Aeros	39	18	17	35	50
Lara Perks	Beatrice Aeros	35	16	19	35	16
Lori Dupuis	Brampton Thunder	22	15	20	35	18
Nathalie Fournier	Bonaventure Wingstar	33	14	21	35	25
Sommer West	Beatrice Aeros	33	11	22	33	38
Geraldine Heaney	Beatrice Aeros	29	8	25	33	22
Annie Fahlenbock	Mississauga Chiefs	37	10	22	32	8
Tara McKay	Brampton Thunder	38	10	21	31	20
Julie Pelletier	Laval Le Mistral	33	15	15	30	26

== 1998–99 Eastern Division All-Star Team ==
=== First All-Star Team ===
==== Goalie ====
- Marie-France Morin, NCCP Raiders

==== Defense ====
- Isabelle Chartrand, Laval Le Mistral
- Isabelle Surprenant, Montreal Jofa-Titan

==== Forward ====
- Annie Desrosiers, Laval Le Mistral
- Nancy Drolet, Montreal Jofa-Titan
- Caroline Ouellette, Bonaventure Wingstar

=== Second All-Star Team ===
==== Goalie (tie) ====
- Vania Goeury, Laval Le Mistral
- Marie-Claude Roy, Montreal Jofa-Titan

==== Defense ====
- Anik Bouchard, Laval Le Mistral
- Nancy Robitaille, Bonaventure Winstar

==== Forward ====
- Dana Avery, NCCP Raiders
- Mai-Lan Le, Montreal Jofa-Titan
- Julie Pelletier, Laval Le Mistral

== 1998–99 Western Division All-Star Team ==
=== First All-Star Team ===
==== Goalie ====
- Jen Dewar, Mississauga Chiefs

==== Defense ====
- Nathalie Rivard, Mississauga Chiefs
- Sue Merz, Brampton Thunder

==== Forward ====
- Andria Hunter, Mississauga Chiefs
- Angela James, Beatrice Aeros
- Vicky Sunohara, Brampton Thunder

=== Second All-Star Team ===
==== Goalie ====
- Kendra Fisher, Beatrice Aeros

==== Defense ====
- Carol Cooper, Mississauga Chiefs
- Gillian Ferrari, Beatrice Aero

==== Forward ====
- Lori Dupuis, Brampton Thunder
- Annie Fahlenbock, Mississauga Chiefs
- Jayna Hefford, Brampton Thunder

== See also ==
- National Women's Hockey League (1999–2007) (NWHL)
