= Montreal Axion =

- City: Montreal, Quebec
- League: National Women's Hockey League
- Division: Central/Eastern
- Founded: 1998
- Folded: 2007
- Home arena: Centre Étienne Desmarteau
- Colours: Dark blue, red & white
- Owners: Robert Vegiard and France St-Louis
- General manager: Sylvain Dutil
- Head coach: Yanick Evola
- Captain: Lisa-Marie Breton; Alternate captains: Annie Desrosiers, Catherine De Abreu and Cathy Chartrand

The Montreal Axion were a National Women's Hockey League team (2003 to 2007) located in Montreal, Quebec, Canada. The Axion represented Quebec at the 2005 Esso Women's Nationals. They were previously known as Bonaventure Wingstar (1998–99) and Montreal Wingstar (1999–2003). This team was succeeded as the women's professional hockey team of Montreal by the Montreal Stars in the Canadian Women's Hockey League, starting with the 2007–2008 season.

== History ==
The team evolved in the National Women's Hockey League starting in the 1998–99 season. During the inaugural season, they were named the "Bonaventure Wingstar", then the following season, they became the "Montreal Wingstar". Five years after its creation, in 2003, the team was renamed the Montreal Axion.

=== Season-by-season ===
Year by year
Season	GP	W	L	T	GF	GA	Pts
1998–99	34	13	16	5	104	91	31
1999–2000	35	18	7	10	116	62	46
2000–01	40	30	6	4	163	63	64
2001–02	30	11	14	5	66	78	27
2002–03	36	18	15	3	83	81	39
2003–04	36	20	11	5	113	84	46
2004–05	36	24	10	2	140	85	51
2005–06	36	14	19	3	100	122	33
2006–07	13	6	7	0	66	56	13

Note: GP = Games played, W = Wins, L = Losses, T = Ties, GF = Goals for, GA = Goals against, Pts = Points.

1998–99

The team takes gains the first championship of its division. During the playoff rounds, the Wingstar manages to steal in the first tour by winning its 2 matches and to consider for championship finale. The team loses the finale match 2–5 against Brampton Thunder which is crowned champion.

1999–2000

The second season is more difficult and the Wingstar escapes from a single point the first position to the Division classification. In playoffs, St-Julie's panthers eliminate Wingstar from the first round:

On Saturday, 4 March 2000: St-Julie Panthers 6–0 Montreal Wingstar
On Sunday, 5 March 2000: Montreal Wingstar 2–1 St-Julie Panthers
in Extra time): Montreal Wingstar 0–1 St-Julie Panthers

2000–01

The big addition of the 2000–01 season is the arrival of the goaltender Manon Rhéaume. Rhéaume performed indeed and help the team to finish at the top of the East Division. The team's attack is not outdone by the presence of Caroline Ouellette and France St-Louis. Behind the bench, Julie Healy acts as coach. Healy sees furthermore in the supervision of Concordia Stingers.

2004–05

Several new players come lent strong hand to the team, among others Gina Kingsbury, Angela Ruggiero, Jenny Lavigne and Annie Desrosiers. For Goaltender, Charline Labonté replaces Manon Rhéaume. The Axion ends in the Eastern Division rank and 3rd in the league. Gina Kingsbury score 31 goals and has 29 assist. She finish the season of 30 matches with more than 60 points contributing to the Axion'successes. In the Playoff rounds, Montreal Axion goes to finale game but loses in barrage 5–4 against Toronto Aeros. Also Montreal Axion represents Quebec to the 2005 Esso National Championships.

2005–06

Axion of Montreal wins the National Women's Hockey League Championship by a victory 1–0 against Brampton Thunder in front of 6 000 supporters at Brampton, Ontario. The victorious Goal is scorer by Lisa-Marie Breton and the Shutout goes to Charline Labonté. Axion beforehand finished in the second rank) of its division, behind Ottawa Raiders. It is about the only championship taken gained by Montreal Axion in the history of the National Women's Hockey League.

2006–07

Less fortunate, this season, Montreal Axion ends in the Division 5th rank of the regular season but recovers serial eliminating heats: at first by gaining the East Division Championship then by participating in Championship Finale of National Women's Hockey League. Brampton Thunder triumphs 4–0 against Montreal Axion. Bramton Thunder so takes gains the championship. In the grip of grave difficulty financiers, the National Women's Hockey League stops its activities a little time after

=== Season standings ===
= Indicates First Place finish

= Indicates championship

Year	Regular season	Playoffs
1998–99	1st place, Eastern Division	lost in final (Silver Medal)
1999–2000	2nd, Eastern Division	eliminated in first round
2000–01	1st place, Eastern Division	eliminated in first round
2001–02	2nd, Eastern Division	eliminated in first round
2002–03	1st place, Eastern Division	eliminated in first round
2003–04	1st place, Eastern Division	eliminated in first round
2004–05	1st place, Eastern Division	Finalist, lost in Final game
2005–06	2nd, Eastern Division	NWHL champions
2006–07	5th, in one division	finalist, lost the final game

=== NWHL Championships ===
- 1998–99 finalist and lost the final game again Brampton Thunder
- 2004–05 finalist and lost the final game again Toronto Aeros
- 2005–06 won the championship
- 2006–07 finalist and lost the final game again Brampton

== 2006–07 roster ==
Goalies
Number		Player	Former Team	Hometown
54	(Canada)	Sabrina Patenaude	Montreal Axion (2005–06)	Pierrefond, Quebec
53	(Canada)	Jenny Lavigne	Montreal Axion (2005–06)	Montreal, Quebec
20	(Canada)	Sophie Courtemanche	Montreal Axion (2005–06)	
20	(Canada)	Krystel Boutin	Montreal Axion (2005–06)	Longueuil, Quebec

Defense
Number		Player	Former Team	Hometown
77	(Canada)	Caroline Laforge	Montreal Axion (2005–06)	
73	(Canada)	Roxanne Dupuis	Montreal Axion (2005–06)	Montreal, Quebec
55	(Canada)	Catherine Ward	Montreal Axion (2005–06)	Montreal, Quebec
24	(Canada)	Catherine De Abreu	Montreal Axion (2005–06)	Roxboro, Quebec
19	(Canada)	Leanne Martell	Montreal Axion (2005–06)	Trenton, Nova Scotia
13	(Canada)	Jessica Finlayson	Montreal Axion (2005–06)	Seaforth, Ontario
9	(Canada)	Chantal Guevremont	Montreal Axion (2005–06)	St-Laurent, Quebec
7	(Canada)	Cathy Chartrand	Montreal Axion (2005–06)	Nomininque, Quebec
5	(United States)	Meghan Maguire	Montreal Axion 2005–06	Amherst, New Hampshire

Forwards
Number		Player	Former Team	Hometown
96	(Canada)	Dominique Thibault	Montreal Axion (2005–06)	Boucherville, Quebec
48	(Canada)	Annie Desrosiers	Montreal Axion (2005–06)	St-Antoine-sur-Richelieu, Quebec
27	(Canada)	Catherine Bertrand	Montreal Axion (2005–06)	Sherbrooke, Quebec
26	(Canada)	Lisa-Marie Breton	Montreal Axion (2005–06)	Montreal, Quebec
25	(Canada)	Melanie Mantha	Montreal Axion (2005–06)	Montreal, Quebec
23	(Canada)	Jesse Scanzano	Montreal Axion (2005–06)	Montreal, Quebec
22	(Canada)	Erika Pouliot	Montreal Axion (2005–06)	Montreal, Quebec
16	(Canada)	Valerie Hamel	Montreal Azion (2005–06)	Montreal, Quebec
16	(Canada)	Karell Emard	Montreal Axion (2005–06)	Richelieu, Quebec
12	(Canada)	Kelly Sudia	Montreal Axion (2005–06)	Pointe-Claire, Quebec
11	(Canada)	Anouk Grignon-Langlais	Montreal Axion (2005–06)	Outremont, Quebec
7	(Canada)	Veronique Sanfacon	Montreal Axion (2005–06)	Beauport, Quebec
6	(Canada)	Sarah Smiley	Montreal Axion (2005–06)	Toronto, Ontario
5	(Canada)	Cynthia Morin	Montreal Axion (2005–06)	

== Notable players ==
Several former players of Montreal Axion become famous in the new Canadian Women's Hockey League, among others Lisa-Marie Breton-Lebreux, Caroline Ouellette, Kim St-Pierre, Nathalie Déry, Angela Ruggiero, Dominique Thibault, Emmanuelle Blais, Charline Labonté, Sabrina Harbec, Jesse Scanzano, Kelly Sudia and Jenny Lavigne

- Therese Brisson Defender
- Charline Labonte Goalie
- Caroline Ouellette Forward
- Gina Kingsbury Forward
- Angela Ruggiero (2005–2006)
- Jesse Scanzano Forward (2005–06 and 2006–07)
- France St-Louis Forward (1998–99 and 1999–2000)
- Kim St-Pierre Goalie (2006–2007)

== Coaching staff ==
- General Manager: Sylvain Dutil
- Head Coach: Yanick Evola, Julie Healy (for Montreal Wingstar, season 2000–01)
- Assistant Coach: Alain Hénault
- Assistant Coach: Patrick Larivière

== See also ==
- National Women's Hockey League (1999–2007) (NWHL)
- Montreal Stars
