= 2001–02 NWHL season =

== Final standings ==
Note: GP = Games played, W = Wins, L = Losses, T = Ties, GF = Goals for, GA = Goals against, Pts = Points.

Eastern Division
No.	Team	GP	W	L	T	GF	GA	Pts
1	Ottawa Raiders	30	14	10	6	71	72	34
2	Montreal Wingstar	30	11	14	5	66	78	27
3	Metropol Le Cheyenne	30	11	15	4	73	85	26

Western Division
No.	Team	GP	W	L	T	GF	GA	Pts
1	Beatrice Aeros	30	23	2	5	149	39	51
2	Mississauga Chiefs	30	12	10	8	82	81	32
3	Brampton Thunder	30	8	14	8	73	97	24
4	Telus Lightning	30	4	18	8	59	120	16

Exhibition schedule
No.	Team	GP	W	L	T	GF	GA	Pts
1	Vancouver Griffins	31	27	4	0	84	14	54

The Vancouver Griffins played a 31 game exhibition schedule, against male and female Canadian Interuniversity Athletics Union teams, British Columbia and Alberta provincial women's teams, and NWHL teams.

== Playoffs ==
- The Beatrice Aeros won the Championship of the NWHL.

== See also ==
- National Women's Hockey League (1999–2007) (NWHL)
