= Sommer West =

Canadian ice hockey player (born 1978)

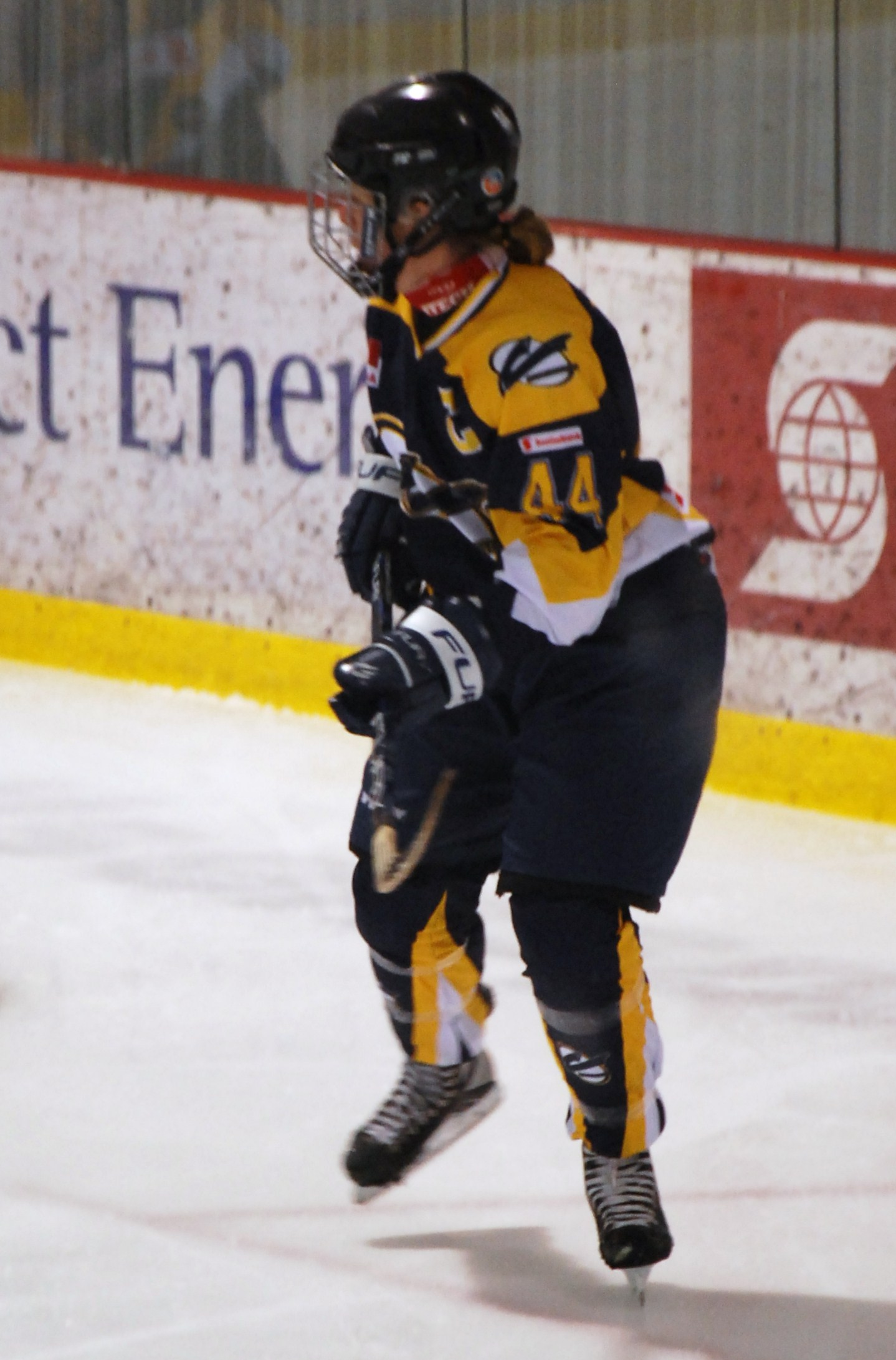
- Pictures from Ottawa Senators games during the 2008/09 CWHL season
- Born: April 24, 1978 (age 48) Houston, Texas, U.S.
- Height: 5 ft 8 in (173 cm)
- Weight: 160 lb (73 kg; 11 st 6 lb)
- Position: Forward
- Shot: Left
- NWHL CWHL team: Beatrice Aeros; Mississauga Chiefs; Burlington Barracudas
- National team: Canada
- Playing career: 1998–2012

Sommer West (born April 24, 1978 in Houston, Texas and raised in Bowmanville, Ontario) was a Canadian Olympic softball player at the 2000 Summer Olympics. In addition, she was a former member of the Canadian national women's hockey team. She was also an ice hockey player in the Canadian Women's Hockey League (CWHL). West has competed for the Mississauga Chiefs and Burlington Barracudas in the CWHL. Currently, she is the head coach of the Toronto Furies of the Canadian Women's Hockey League. As head coach of the Toronto Furies, she led the squad to the 2014 Clarkson Cup championship.

== Athletic career ==
West was a prominent softball player. She was an All-Star shortstop at both the 1997 and 1998 Canadian women's Nationals. She helped earn a silver medal for Canada in softball at the Pan Am Games in 1999. In addition, West was a member of Team Canada at the 2000 Olympics in Sydney, competing at first base. One of her teammates was Olympic ice hockey player Hayley Wickenheiser. West also played first base on the 2002 National softball team.

=== Hockey ===
In ice hockey, West was a member of the U18 Canadian national champions, and a member of the Canadian Under 22 National Team in 1999. West also participated with the Senior National women's team in two Four Nations Cup tournaments (1998 and 1999, respectively).

She also played for Canada in a series vs. Sweden in January 2001 and the TSN Challenge vs. USA in January 2001. Five years later, West attended the Canadian National Women's Team Fall Festival in Kenora, Ontario.

At the age of eighteen, West competed in the National Women's Hockey League. She was part of four NWHL championships four consecutive years.

In the 2005 NWHL Cup Final, she was the overtime hero as the Toronto Aeros won their fourth playoff title in six years. Down 3-0 after 10 minutes, West scored three times in the second period, then scored the overtime winner in the 5-4 victory over the Montréal Axion.

In 2005-06, she led the league in points and was voted NWHL Offensive Player of the Year.

With the Mississauga Chiefs of the NWHL, West also served as team captain during 2007-08. Her teammates on the Chiefs have included Olympic gold medallists Jennifer Botterill and Sami Jo Small. As a member of the Mississauga Chiefs, she competed in the Esso Women's Nationals in 2004, 2005, 2007 and 2008.

=== CWHL ===
In the 2011 CWHL Draft, she was selected by the Burlington Barracudas.

West retired after the 2011-12 CWHL season, leaving the five-year-old league as the CWHL's fifth-best scorer with 149 points (125 games played from 2007-08 to 2011-12). She scored a goal in her final CWHL game.

Currently, she is the head coach of the Toronto Furies.

== Career stats ==
=== Hockey Canada ===
Year	Event	Games	Goals	Assists	Points	PIM
1998	3 Nations Cup	2	0	0	0	0
1999	3 Nations Cup	5	1	0	1	0
2001	National Team Tour	5	0	2	2	4

=== Esso Women’s Nationals ===
Year	Event	Team	GP	G	A	PTS	PIM
2004	Esso Women's Nationals	Mississauga Chiefs	6	4	3	7	6
2005	Esso Women's Nationals	Mississauga Chiefs	7	5	2	7	6
2007	National Women's Team Evaluation Camp		3	0	0	0	2

== Awards and honours ==
- Clarington Sports Hall of Fame inductee (2008)
- NWHL Most Valuable Player, 2005
- 2014 CWHL Coach of the Year

== Personal ==
Her father is Steve West, who played professional hockey in the 1970s for the Winnipeg Jets and the Houston Aeros of the WHA.
