= 2016–17 Dartmouth Big Green women's ice hockey season =

- Conference: 11th ECAC Hockey
- Home ice: Thompson Arena

Record
- Overall: 7-21-0
- Home: 5-9-0
- Road: 2-12-0

Coaches and captains
- Head coach: Laura Schuler
- Assistant coaches: Chris Cobb; Courtney Sheary
- Captain: Mackenzie St. Onge
- Alternate captain(s): Kennedy Ottenbreit; Eleni Tebano

The Dartmouth Big Green represented Dartmouth College in ECAC women's ice hockey during the 2016–17 NCAA Division I women's ice hockey season.

== Offseason ==
- August 22: Laura Stacey ('16) was drafted by the Brampton Thunder of the Canadian Women's Hockey League. A

=== Recruiting ===
Player	Position	Nationality	Notes
Bailee Brekke	Defense	United States	Attended Culver Academies
Rose Falzone	Forward	Canada	Alternate Captain for Team Ontario U-18
Sydney Hill	Defense	Canada	Played for Team Saskatchewan U18
Sabrina Huett	Forward	United States	Attended Choate-Rosemary Hall
Cecilia Lopez	Forward	Canada	With Team Manitoba U18
Sara López-Wheeler	Defense	United States	Blue-liner for Mid Fairfield Connecticut Stars
Christina Rombaut	Forward	Canada	Alternate Captain for Team Atlantic U-18

== 2016–17 Big Green ==
No.	Nat.	Player	Class	Pos	Height	DoB	Hometown	Previous team
2		Sydney Hill	Freshman	D	5' 5" (1.65 m)		Redvers, Saskatchewan	Team Saskatchewan U18
4		Caroline Shaunessy	Sophomore	D	5' 9" (1.75 m)		Duxbury, Massachusetts	Bay State Breakers
6		Bailee Brekke	Freshman	D	5' 7" (1.7 m)		Oxford, Ohio	Culver Academies
7		Christina Rombaut	Freshman	F	5' 6" (1.68 m)		Rothesay, New Brunswick	Team Atlantic U-18
9		Eleni Tebano (A)	Senior	D	5' 6" (1.68 m)		Glastonbury, Connecticut	Westminster School
10		Morgan Turner	Junior	F	5' 8" (1.73 m)		Chicago, Illinois	Chicago Mission
11		Alyssa Baker	Sophomore	F	5' 6" (1.68 m)		Ottawa, Ontario	Nepean Jr. Wildcats
12		MacKenzie St. Onge (C)	Senior	F	5' 7" (1.7 m)		Stowe, Vermont	North American Hockey Academy
13		Cecilia Lopez	Freshman	F	5' 8" (1.73 m)		Winnipeg, Manitoba	Team Manitoba U18
14		Sabrina Huett	Freshman	F	5' 9" (1.75 m)		Plainfield, New Hampshire	Choate-Rosemary Hall
16		Hailey Noronha	Junior	D	5' 5" (1.65 m)		Newmarket, Ontario	Whitby Jr. Wolves
17		Tess Bracken	Sophomore	D	5' 7" (1.7 m)		Winnipeg, Manitoba	Team Manitoba
18		Kennedy Ottenbreit (A)	Senior	F	5' 8" (1.73 m)		Grayson, Saskatchewan	Shattuck-St. Mary's
19		Devon Moir	Senior	F	5' 5" (1.65 m)		Toronto, Ontario	Toronto Jr. Aeros
20		Sara López-Wheeler	Freshman	D	5' 11" (1.8 m)		Cambridge, Massachusetts	Mid Fairfield Connecticut Stars
21		Brooke Ahbe	Junior	F	5' 8" (1.73 m)		Centennial, Colorado	Shattuck-St. Mary's
22		Kate Landers	Sophomore	F	5' 5" (1.65 m)		Chicago, Illinois	Chicago Mission
23		Katy Ratty	Senior	F	5' 2" (1.57 m)		Northfield, Illinois	Chicago Mission
24		Emma Korbs	Senior	D	5' 6" (1.68 m)		Toronto, Ontario	Malvern HS
27		Rose Falzone	Freshman	F	5' 4" (1.63 m)		Nobleton, Ontario	Mississauga Jr. Chiefs
29		Shannon Ropp	Sophomore	G	5' 3" (1.6 m)		West Bloomfield, Michigan	Honeybaked U19
30		Robyn Chemago	Senior	G	5' 6" (1.68 m)		Slave Lake, Alberta	Roland Michner Secondary School
31		Christie Honor	Sophomore	G	5' 8" (1.73 m)		Mississauga, Ontario	Etobicoke Jr. Dolphins

== 2016-17 Schedule ==
Date	Opponent^{#}	Rank^{#}	Site	Decision	Result	Record
Regular Season
October 21	Northeastern*		Thompson Arena • Hanover, NH	Robyn Chemago	W 0–3	0–1–0
October 23	Harvard		Thompson Arena • Hanover, NH	Robyn Chemago	L 1–5	0–2–0 (0–1–0)
October 28	at #6 St. Lawrence		Appleton Arena • Canton, NY	Christie Honor	L 0–2	0–3–0 (0–2–0)
October 29	at #8 Clarkson		Cheel Arena • Potsdam, NY	Christie Honor	L 1–6	0–4–0 (0–3–0)
November 11	#8 Quinnipiac		Thompson Arena • Hanover, NH	Robyn Chemago	L 1–2	0–5–0 (0–4–0)
November 12	#10 Princeton		Thompson Arena • Hanover, NH	Robyn Chemago	W 3–2 ^{OT}	1–5–0 (1–4–0)
November 28	at Maine*		Alfond Arena • Orono, ME	Robyn Chemago	W 4–0	2–5–0
November 29	at Maine*		Alfond Arena • Orono, ME	Robyn Chemago	L 2–3	2–6–0
December 2	at #7 Colgate		Class of 1965 Arena • Hamilton, NY	Robyn Chemago	L 1–2	2–7–0 (1–5–0)
December 3	at Cornell		Lynah Rink • Ithaca, NY	Robyn Chemago	L 1–2	2–8–0 (1–6–0)
December 7	#6 Boston College*		Thompson Arena • Hanover, NH	Robyn Chemago	L 1–6	2–9–0
December 10	at Vermont*		Gutterson Fieldhouse • Burlington, VT	Christie Honor	L 2–4	2–10–0
January 6, 2017	at Princeton		Hobey Baker Memorial Rink • Princeton, NJ	Robyn Chemago	L 0–4	2–11–0 (1–7–0)
January 7	at Quinnipiac		High Point Solutions Arena • Hamden, CT	Robyn Chemago	L 1–3	2–12–0 (1–8–0)
January 10	New Hampshire*		Thompson Arena • Hanover, NH	Christie Honor	W 2–1	3–12–0
January 13	Union		Thompson Arena • Hanover, NH	Robyn Chemago	W 2–1	4–12–0 (2–8–0)
January 14	Rensselaer		Thompson Arena • Hanover, NH	Robyn Chemago	W 2–1 ^{OT}	5–12–0 (3–8–0)
January 17	at Harvard		Bright-Landry Hockey Center • Allston, Massachusetts	Christie Honor	L 1–2	5–13–0 (3–9–0)
January 20	at Yale		Ingalls Rink • New Haven, CT	Robyn Chemago	L 0–3	5–14–0 (3–10–0)
January 21	at Brown		Meehan Auditorium • Providence, RI	Robyn Chemago	L 0–1	5–15–0 (3–11–0)
January 27	#8 Cornell		Thompson Arena • Hanover, NH	Robyn Chemago	L 0–1	5–16–0 (3–12–0)
January 28	Colgate		Thompson Arena • Hanover, NH	Robyn Chemago	L 1–6	5–17–0 (3–13–0)
February 3	#3 Clarkson		Thompson Arena • Hanover, NH	Robyn Chemago	L 0–3	5–18–0 (3–14–0)
February 4	#5 St. Lawrence		Thompson Arena • Hanover, NH	Robyn Chemago	L 1–2	5–19–0 (3–15–0)
February 10	at Rensselaer		Houston Field House • Troy, NY	Robyn Chemago	W 4–0	6–19–0 (4–15–0)
February 11	at Union		Achilles Center • Schenectady, NY	Robyn Chemago	L 1–2	6–20–0 (4–16–0)
February 17	Brown		Thompson Arena • Hanover, NH	Robyn Chemago	L 2–5	6–21–0 (4–17–0)
February 18	Yale		Thompson Arena • Hanover, NH	Robyn Chemago	W 4–2	7–21–0 (5–17–0)
*Non-conference game. ^{#}Rankings from USCHO.com Poll.
