= 2000–01 NWHL season =

In the 2000–01 season, the former Canadian National Women's Hockey League championship was won by the Beatrice Aeros team from Toronto. Jayna Hefford of Brampton Thunder had the best goalscoring record.

== Final standings ==
Note: GP = Games played, W = Wins, L = Losses, T = Ties, GF = Goals for, GA = Goals against, Pts = Points.

Eastern Division
| No. | Team | GP | W | L | T | GF | GA | Pts |
|---|---|---|---|---|---|---|---|---|
| 1 | Montreal Wingstar | 40 | 30 | 6 | 4 | 163 | 63 | 64 |
| 2 | Sainte-Julie Pantheres | 40 | 22 | 15 | 3 | 168 | 102 | 47 |
| 3 | Ottawa Raiders | 40 | 11 | 25 | 4 | 78 | 150 | 26 |
| 4 | Laval Le Mistral | 40 | 5 | 33 | 2 | 68 | 261 | 12 |

Western Division
| No. | Team | GP | W | L | T | GF | GA | Pts |
|---|---|---|---|---|---|---|---|---|
| 1 | Beatrice Aeros | 40 | 35 | 2 | 3 | 222 | 48 | 73 |
| 2 | Brampton Thunder | 40 | 30 | 7 | 3 | 223 | 82 | 63 |
| 3 | Mississauga Chiefs | 40 | 21 | 16 | 3 | 107 | 97 | 45 |
| 4 | Toronto Sting | 40 | 8 | 29 | 3 | 82 | 168 | 19 |
| 5 | Clearnet Lightning | 40 | 5 | 34 | 1 | 77 | 219 | 11 |

Exhibition schedule
| No. | Team | GP | W | L | T | GF | GA | Pts |
|---|---|---|---|---|---|---|---|---|
| | Vancouver Griffins | 18 | 14 | 4 | 0 | 91 | 43 | 28 |

The Vancouver Griffins played an 18 game exhibition schedule, against male and female Canadian Interuniversity Athletics Union teams, British Columbia and Alberta provincial women's teams, and NWHL teams.

== Playoffs ==
- March 18, 2001: Sainte-Julie Pantheres 2, Beatrice Aeros 2
- March 19, 2001: Beatrice Aeros 8, Sainte-Julie Pantheres 1

Beatrice Aeros wins won the championship of the NWHL based on total goals scored.

== Scoring leaders ==
| Player | Teams | Goals | Assists | Points |
| Jayna Hefford | Brampton | 30 | 29 | 59 |
| Amy Turek | Beatrice Aeros | 28 | 30 | 58 |
| Caroline Ouellette | Montreal | 21 | 32 | 53 |
| Karen Nystrom | Brampton | 18 | 30 | 48 |
| Vicky Sunohara | Brampton | 17 | 25 | 42 |
| Gillian Apps | Beatrice Aeros | 22 | 20 | 42 |
| Lori Dupuis | Brampton | 23 | 15 | 38 |
| Cherie Piper | Beatrice Aeros | 19 | 18 | 37 |
| Andria Hunter | Mississauga | 15 | 22 | 37 |
