= Steve West (ice hockey) =

Canadian ice hockey player

- Born: March 20, 1952 (age 74) Peterborough, Ontario, Canada
- Height: 5 ft 8 in (173 cm)
- Weight: 165 lb (75 kg; 11 st 11 lb)
- Position: Centre
- Shot: Left
- Played for: Michigan Stags; Baltimore Blades; Houston Aeros; Winnipeg Jets
- National team: Canada
- NHL draft: 92nd overall, 1972; Minnesota North Stars
- WHA draft: Undrafted
- Playing career: 1970–1981

Steve West (born March 20, 1952) is a Canadian former professional ice hockey forward. Born in Peterborough, Ontario, West played 142 games in the World Hockey Association with the Michigan Stags, Baltimore Blades, Houston Aeros and Winnipeg Jets.

== Personal ==
His daughter, Sommer West, was a Canadian Olympic softball player at the 2000 Summer Olympics and played for over a decade in the Canadian Women's Hockey League.

== Career statistics ==
=== Regular season and playoffs ===
			Regular season					Playoffs
Season	Team	League	GP	G	A	Pts	PIM	GP	G	A	Pts	PIM
1970–71	Oshawa Generals	OHA	2	2	0	2	0	––	––	––	––	––
1971–72	Oshawa Generals	OHA	63	30	43	73	40	––	––	––	––	––
1972–73	Cleveland/Jacksonville Barons	AHL	76	27	42	69	51	––	––	––	––	––
1973–74	New Haven Nighthawks	AHL	76	50	60	110	41	5	4	3	7	0
1974–75	Michigan Stags/Baltimore Blades	WHA	50	15	18	33	4	––	––	––	––	––
1975–76	Tucson Mavericks	CHL	51	25	40	65	29	––	––	––	––	––
1975–76	Greensboro Generals	SHL	1	0	0	0	2	––	––	––	––	––
1975–76	Houston Aeros	WHA	––	––	––	––	––	7	0	1	1	0
1976–77	Oklahoma City Blazers	CHL	76	33	63	96	42	––	––	––	––	––
1976–77	Houston Aeros	WHA	3	0	0	0	2	6	0	0	0	0
1977–78	Houston Aeros	WHA	71	11	21	32	23	6	1	0	1	0
1978–79	Rochester Americans	AHL	47	24	31	55	28	––	––	––	––	––
1978–79	Winnipeg Jets	WHA	18	3	11	14	6	6	2	3	5	2
1979–80	Syracuse Firebirds	AHL	14	4	14	18	4	4	1	0	1	0
1980–81	Port Huron Flags	IHL	9	9	5	14	6	––	––	––	––	––
WHA totals			142	29	50	79	35	25	3	4	7	2

Preceded by Jim Wiley	CHL Leading Scorer; 1976–77	Succeeded by Doug Palazzari
