= Gina Kingsbury =

Canadian ice hockey player, coach, and executive

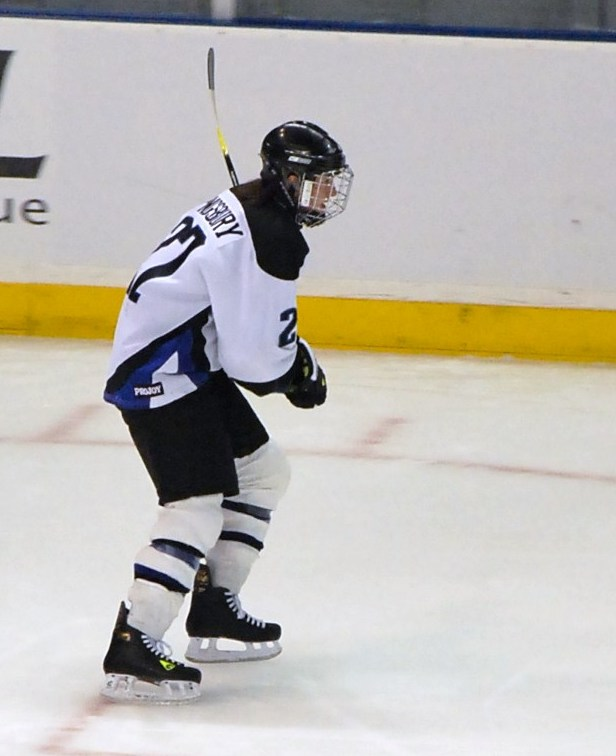
- Born: November 26, 1981 (age 44) Uranium City, Saskatchewan, Canada
- Height: 5 ft 8 in (173 cm)
- Weight: 137 lb (62 kg; 9 st 11 lb)
- Position: Centre
- Shot: Left
- ECAC team NWHL team WWHL team: St. Lawrence Saints; Montreal Axion; Calgary Oval X-Treme
- Coached for: as assistant coach; Calgary Inferno; France U18; Canada U18
- National team: Canada
- Playing career: 2000–2010
- Coaching career: 2013–present
Medal record
Women's ice hockey
Representing Canada
Olympic Games
Gold medal – first place	2006 Turin	Tournament
Gold medal – first place	2010 Vancouver	Tournament
IIHF World Women's Championships
Gold medal – first place	2001 United States	Tournament
Gold medal – first place	2004 Canada	Tournament
Gold medal – first place	2007 Canada	Tournament
Silver medal – second place	2005 Sweden	Tournament
Silver medal – second place	2008 China	Tournament
Silver medal – second place	2009 Finland	Tournament

Gina Kingsbury (born November 26, 1981) is a Canadian former professional ice hockey player and current general manager for the Toronto Sceptres of the Professional Women's Hockey League (PWHL).

== Playing career ==
Besides hockey, Kingsbury participated in field hockey and softball as a student at the Hotchkiss School in Lakeville, Connecticut. Kingsbury participated in the 1995 Canada Winter Games at the age of 13. She competed in the Games again four years later. In 2004–05, she played for the Montreal Axion with her Olympic teammate Charline Labonté.

=== St. Lawrence ===
She attended St. Lawrence University, where she graduated in 2004 with a degree in psychology, and was a key player with the St. Lawrence Skating Saints women's ice hockey program. Kingsbury earned All-America honors at St. Lawrence in her senior season of 2004. In addition, she was a two-time All-Conference player at St. Lawrence and remains in the university's top 5 in career points (152) and goals (74). In 2003–04, her senior year, she finished seventh in NCAA scoring (26 goals and 31 assists in 33 games). Kingsbury also holds the school record for most points in a game with nine points (4 goals, 5 assists).

=== Hockey Canada ===
Kingsbury joined the national program in 1999, as a member of the Under-22 team. At the age of 19, she joined the senior team for the IIHF 2001 World Championship. She had two goals and two assists in the tournament, winning the gold medal. In the middle of the second period of the gold medal game, Canada had a 2–1 lead and Kingsbury started to shed tears because she knew the team was close to winning gold. Head coach Danielle Sauvageau told her to hold back but she says was excited to be part of a gold medal team.

The 2006 Olympic Winter Games in Turin was Kingsbury's first Olympics. She played on Team Canada's "Kid Line" along with Meghan Agosta and Katie Weatherston. The members of the line were considered three of the most promising young prospects. Kingsbury finished the tournament with three assists, and winning her first Olympic gold.

Two subsequent appearances in the IIHF World's followed. Kingsbury contributed two goals over five games at the 2007 World Women's Hockey Championship in Winnipeg, where Team Canada won the World Championship gold medal. At the IIHF Worlds in Harbin, China, Kingsbury scored one goal and three assists in five games as Team Canada went on to take the silver medal.

When Kingsbury won her first gold medal with Canada in 2006, she became the third St. Lawrence alumnus athlete to win an Olympic gold medal. Her jersey number for Canada is 27, the same number that she had while skating for St. Lawrence. Fellow hockey player, Isabelle Chartrand was the second St. Lawrence alumnus who won an Olympic gold medal (doing so with Canada's women in 2002). The first St. Lawrence alum was Ed Rimkus, who won gold in 1932.

She has won two gold medals (in 2001 and 2004) and a silver (2005) in total at the women's world championships.

On September 14, 2010, Hockey Canada announced that Kingsbury, along with three other players retired from international hockey. As part of the IIHF Ambassador and Mentor Program, Kingsbury was a Hockey Canada athlete ambassador that travelled to Bratislava, Slovakia to participate in the 2011 IIHF High Performance Women's Camp from July 4–12.

=== CWHL ===
After graduating from St. Lawrence, played the 2004–05 season with the Montreal Axion of the National Women's Hockey League (NWHL). She led the team with 31 goals and added 29 assists, finishing the 30-game season with 60 points. Kingsbury joined the Calgary Oval X-Treme of the Western Women's Hockey League (WWHL) in 2006. She had 31 points (11 goals, 20 assists) in 19 games as the Oval X-Treme went on to win the Esso Women's National Championship. In 2007–08, Kingsbury was in her second season with the Calgary Oval X-Treme of the Western Women's Hockey League, Kingsbury scored 20 goals and added 25 assists in 23 games.

== Career stats ==
=== St. Lawrence ===
Year	Goals	Assists	Points	Power play goals
2000-01	14	15	29	5
2001-02	19	12	31	6
2002-03	15	20	35	3
2003-04	26	31	57	7

=== Hockey Canada ===
Event	Games	Goals	Assists	Points	PIM
2001 IIHF Worlds	4	2	2	4	0
2004 IIHF Worlds	5	1	1	2	4
2005 IIHF Worlds	5	2	0	2	4
2007 IIHF Worlds	5	2	0	2	0
2008 IIHF Worlds	5	1	3	4	0

== Coaching ==
After announcing her retirement from the national women's team, she became an assistant coach at the Okanagan Hockey Academy in Penticton, B.C. On July 10, 2014, she was named an assistant coach for the Minnesota Duluth Bulldogs women's ice hockey program in the Western Collegiate Hockey Association.

== Managerial ==
On July 26, 2018, it was announced that Kingsbury would take over the management role of the Canada women's national ice hockey team at Hockey Canada from Melody Davidson, who stepped out of the general manager's job after eight years to focus on scouting. Kingsbury was named the general manager of the Toronto Sceptres in the Professional Women's Hockey League in 2023.

== Awards and honours ==
- Top Forward, Pool A, 2007 Esso Canadian Women's Nationals
- 2002 ECAC North First Team

== Personal ==
Kingsbury was born in Uranium City, Saskatchewan, but when she was 8 months old, uranium mine closures prompted her family to move to Rouyn-Noranda, Quebec.
