= Central Ontario Women's Hockey League =

The Central Ontario Women's Hockey League (COWHL) is a defunct hockey league in Ontario, Canada. During the 1998–99 season, the COWHL was renamed the National Women's Hockey League as the teams from the former league began to compete against teams from Quebec.

== Teams ==
- Guelph Eagles
- Hamilton Golden Hawks
- London Devilettes
- Mississauga Chiefs
- Newtonbrook Panthers
- Peterborough Skyway
- Peterborough Pirates
- Junior Aeros
- Scarborough Firefighters
- Scarborough Sting
- North York Aeros
- Toronto Red Wings

== Final Standing year by year ==
=== 1992-93 ===
No.	Team	GP	W	L	OTL	GF	GA	Pts
1	Toronto Aeros	30	20	4	6	101	42	46
2	Scarborough Sting	30	10	12	8	49	64	28
3	Scarborough Firefighters	30	9	15	6	58	79	24

=== 1993-94 ===
No.	Team	GP	W	L	OTL	GF	GA	Pts
1	Toronto Aeros	30	26	2	2	152	32	54
2	Scarborough Firefighters	30	14	11	5	103	62	33
3	Junior Aeros	30	13	11	6	101	73	32
4	Scarborough Sting	30	13	12	5	63	67	31
5	Mississauga Chiefs	30	11	12	7	60	60	29
6	Hamilton Golden Hawks	30	0	29	1	28	223	1

=== 1994-95 ===
Non-available

=== 1995-96 ===
No.	Team	GP	W	L	OTL	GF	GA	Pts
1	North York Aeros	30	26	3	1	166	42	53
2	Toronto Red Wings	30	22	5	3	169	60	47
3	Mississauga Chiefs	30	18	10	2	98	57	38
4	Peterborough Skyway	30	10	14	6	82	115	26
5	London Devilettes	30	4	23	3	81	159	11
6	Hamilton Golden Hawks	30	2	27	1	45	208	5

=== 1996-97 ===
No.	Team	GP	W	L	OTL	GF	GA	Pts
1	North York Aeros	36	29	1	6	255	39	64
2	Newtonbrook Panthers	36	25	3	8	210	58	58
3	Mississauga Chiefs	36	26	5	5	213	37	57
4	Scarborough Sting	36	12	19	5	64	129	29
5	Peterborough Pirates	36	11	21	4	99	127	26
6	London Devilettes	36	7	27	2	81	204	16
7	Hamilton Golden Hawks	36	1	35	0	37	385	2

=== 1997-98 ===
For this last season, there was only three teams in the COWHL. The three teams played each other five times at home and five times on the road. In addition, they will play exhibition games against the Ottawa Senior AAA and the Brockvill Senior AAA teams.

No.	Team	GP	W	L	OTL	GF	GA	Pts
1	North York Aeros	20	16	1	3	94	29	35
2	Mississauga Chiefs	20	11	6	3	65	49	25
3	Scarborough Sting	20	0	20	0	25	101	0

== Players ==
- Geraldine Heaney began playing for the Toronto Aeros at the age of 13, winning six provincial championships.
- For the first 17 years of her participation in the COWHL, Cathy Phillips played for two different teams: Burlington and Hamilton. She was voted Top Goaltender 14 times and Most Valuable Player twice during her years of play in the COWHL.

== International ==
=== IIHF women's worlds ===
- Mirjam Baechler, Newtonbrook Panthers (Team Switzerland 1992–1997)
- Amanda Benoit, North York Aeros (Team Canada 1996)
- Cassie Campbell, North York Aeros (Team Canada 1994, 1995, 1996, 1997)
- Lori Dupuis, Newtonbrook Panthers (Team Canada 1995, 1996, 1997)
- Kelly Dyer, North York Aeros (Team USA 1990, 1992, 1994, 1995)
- Marianne Grnak, North York Aeros (Team Canada 1994, 1995, 1996)
- Geraldine Heaney, North York Aeros (Team Canada 1990, 1992, 1994, 1996, 1997)
- Jayna Hefford, Mississauga Chiefs (Team Canada 1997)
- Andria Hunter, Newtonbrook Panthers (Team Canada 1992, 1994)
- Angela James, Newtonbrook Panthers (Team Canada 1990, 1992, 1994, 1996, 1997)
- Sari Krooks, North York Aeros (Team Finland 1990, 1992, 1994, 1996)
- Sue Merz, Newtonbrook Panthers (Team USA 1990, 1992, 1994, 1995, 1996, 1997)
- Karen Nystrom, Newtonbrook Panthers (Team Canada 1992, 1994, 1996, 1997)
- Margot Page, Mississauga Chiefs (Team Canada 1990, 1992, 1994)
- Marion Pepels, London Devilettes (Team Netherlands 1990–1996)
- Cheryl Pounder, North York Aeros (Team Canada 1994, 1996)
- Nathalie Rivard, Mississauga Chiefs (Team Canada 1992)
- Laura Schuler, Newtonbrook Panthers (Team Canada 1990, 1992, 1995, 1996, 1997)
- Jeanine Sobek, Newtonbrook Panthers (Team USA 1990, 1992, 1994, 1995, 1996)
- Vicky Sunohara, Scarborough Firefighters (1990 to 1994), Toronto Red Wings (1994 to 1996), and the Newtonbrook Panthers (1996 to 1997) (Team Canada 1990, 1996, 1997)

=== Olympians ===
The following players from the COWHL represented Canada in ice hockey at the Winter Olympic games.

Player	COWHL Team	Event	Result
Cassie Campbell	North York Aeros	1998 Winter Olympics	Silver
Cassie Campbell	North York Aeros	2002 Winter Olympics	Gold
Cassie Campbell	North York Aeros	2006 Winter Olympics	Gold
Lori Dupuis	Newtonbrook Panthers	1998 Winter Olympics	Silver
Lori Dupuis	Newtonbrook Panthers	2002 Winter Olympics	Gold
Jayna Hefford	Mississauga Chiefs	1998 Winter Olympics	Silver
Jayna Hefford	Mississauga Chiefs	2002 Winter Olympics	Gold
Jayna Hefford	Mississauga Chiefs	2006 Winter Olympics	Gold
Jayna Hefford	Mississauga Chiefs	2010 Winter Olympics	Gold
Geraldine Heaney	North York Aeros	1998 Winter Olympics	Silver
Geraldine Heaney	North York Aeros	2002 Winter Olympics	Gold
Karen Nystrom	Scarborough Firefighters	1998 Winter Olympics	Silver
Laura Schuler	Scarborough Firefighters	1998 Winter Olympics	Silver
Vicky Sunohara	Newtonbrook Panthers	1998 Winter Olympics	Silver
Vicky Sunohara	Newtonbrook Panthers	2002 Winter Olympics	Gold
Vicky Sunohara	Newtonbrook Panthers	2006 Winter Olympics	Gold

== Awards and honours ==
- Angela James, Most Valuable Player, COWHL, 1991
- Karen Nystrom, Won COWHL scoring title in 1991-92 (runner-up in 1990–91, 1992–93 and

1996–97)

- Karen Nystrom, COWHL All-Star Team every year from 1989 to 1997
- Karen Nystrom, OWHA champion with Scarborough Firefighters, 1991

=== Esso Nationals ===
Over the years, teams from the COWHL represented the province of Ontario in the Canadian National Women's Hockey championships (also known as the Esso Nationals). The winner of the gold medal was also awarded the Abby Hoffman Cup.

- Beatrice Aeros, Silver medal, 1996
- Beatrice Aeros, Bronze Medal, 1999.

== See also ==
- National Women's Hockey League (1999) NWHL was in service between 1998 and 2007.
