= Scarborough Sting =

- City: Scarborough, Canada
- League: National Women's Hockey League
- Division: Western
- Founded: approximate in 1990's
- Folded: 2001
- Home arena: Mid Scarborough & Malvern
- Colours: Dark blue and white
- General manager: Karen Spence
- Head coach: Michael Crawford and Blake Broke in 1998-99, Merlind Bartley in 2000-01
- Captain: Heather Richardson

The Scarborough Sting was a professional women's ice hockey team in the National Women's Hockey League (NWHL). The team played its home games in Mid Scarborough & Malvern Arena at Scarborough, in Ontario.

== History ==
The Scarborough Sting was founded approximate in 1990's and played in Central Ontario Women's Hockey League (COWHL). The club played several seasons in COWHL. The Scarborough Sting joined the National Women's Hockey League (NWHL) in 1998-99. The first season was difficult: 1 victory, 4 tie and 21 defeats in 40 games. In 1999-2000, surprisingly, the Sting never won at home, collecting all of their points (3 wins and 3 ties) on the road. Thursday, March 30, 2000 Scarborough Sting was face off against Japan National Team in Stouffville, Ontario: Japan 6-1 Scarborough Sting. In 2000-01, the club re-organized and adopted the new name Toronto Sting .

== Season-by-season ==
Year by year
Year	GP	W	L	T	GF	GA	Pts
1998-99	40	1	37	2	32	224	4
1999-2000	40	3	34	3	49	170	9
2000–01	40	8	29	3	82	168	19

Note: GP = Games played, W = Wins, L = Losses, T = Ties, GF = Goals for, GA = Goals against, Pts = Points.

== Season standings ==
Year	Regular season	Playoffs
1998-99	4th, Western Division	no participation to playoff
1999-2000	5th, Western Division	no participation to playoff
2000-01	4th, Western Division	no participation to playoff

== Last current roster 2000-01 ==
Goalies
Number		Player
29	(Canada)	Tracy Cook
1	(Canada)	Keely Brown

Defense
Number		Player
58	(Canada)	Dee Dee Tanguay
23	(Canada)	Coley Dosser
21	(Canada)	Sue Ann Van Damme
19	(Canada)	Sandy Metzger
8	(Canada)	Diana Brown
6	(Canada)	Heather Morden

Forwards
Number		Player
91	(Canada)	Ashley Riggs
36	(Canada)	Heather Richardson
27	(Canada)	Christianne Tremills
16	(Canada)	Bussie Wood
14	(Canada)	Karen Spence
12	(Canada)	Sharon Williamson
11	(Canada)	Kate Foley
3	(Canada)	Deandra Locicero

== Former staff ==
- General Manager: Karen Spence
- Head Coach: in 1998 Michael Crawford and Blake Broker, in 2000 Merlind Bartley. Brad Williams and Gordon Bullock was assistant coaches

== See also ==
- National Women's Hockey League (1999–2007) (NWHL)
