= 2003–04 NWHL season =

== Final standings ==
Note: GP = Games played, W = Wins, L = Losses, T = Ties, OTL = Overtime losses, GF = Goals for, GA = Goals against, Pts = Points.

Eastern Division
No.	Team	GP	W	L	T	OTL	GF	GA	Pts
1	Montreal Axion	36	20	10	5	1	113	84	46
2	Ottawa Raiders	36	9	23	4	0	85	144	22
3	Quebec Avalanche	36	4	28	2	2	65	163	12

Central Division
No.	Team	GP	W	L	T	OTL	GF	GA	Pts
1	Toronto Aeros	36	33	2	1	0	197	42	67
2	Brampton Thunder	36	28	6	2	0	190	72	58
3	Oakville Ice	36	17	17	2	0	118	99	36
4	Telus Lightning	36	8	28	0	0	66	224	16

Western Division
No.	Team	GP	W	L	T	OTL	GF	GA	Pts
1	Calgary Oval X-Treme	12	11	1	0	0	64	9	22
2	Edmonton Chimos	12	1	11	0	0	9	64	2

== Playoffs ==
- Calgary Oval X-Treme 5, Brampton Thunder 4 (Overtime Shootout)

The Calgary Oval X-treme won the Championship of the NWHL.

== See also ==
- National Women's Hockey League (1999–2007) (NWHL)
