= 2004–05 NWHL season =

== Final standings ==
Note: GP = Games played, W = Wins, L = Losses, T = Ties, OTL = Overtime losses, GF = Goals for, GA = Goals against, Pts = Points.

Eastern Division
| No. | Team | GP | W | L | T | OTL | GF | GA | Pts |
|---|---|---|---|---|---|---|---|---|---|
| 1 | Montreal Axion | 36 | 24 | 9 | 2 | 1 | 140 | 85 | 51 |
| 2 | Ottawa Raiders | 36 | 14 | 19 | 2 | 1 | 101 | 128 | 31 |
| 3 | Quebec Avalanche | 36 | 5 | 25 | 4 | 2 | 53 | 132 | 16 |

Central Division
| No. | Team | GP | W | L | T | OTL | GF | GA | Pts |
|---|---|---|---|---|---|---|---|---|---|
| 1 | Brampton Thunder | 36 | 30 | 3 | 2 | 1 | 165 | 70 | 63 |
| 2 | Toronto Aeros | 36 | 24 | 6 | 4 | 2 | 142 | 68 | 54 |
| 3 | Oakville Ice | 36 | 13 | 15 | 6 | 2 | 97 | 99 | 34 |
| 4 | Telus Lightning | 36 | 4 | 28 | 4 | 0 | 72 | 189 | 12 |

== Playoffs ==
- Toronto Aeros 5, Montreal Axion 4 (OT)

The Toronto Aeros won the Championship of the NWHL.

== Notable players ==
Future two-time Olympic Gold Medalist Gina Kingsbury played the 2004-05 season with the Montreal Axion of the National Women's Hockey League. She led the team with 31 goals and added 29 assists, finishing the 30-game season with 60 points.

== See also ==
- National Women's Hockey League (1999–2007) (NWHL)
