= Toronto Aeros =

- City: Toronto, Ontario
- League: National Women's Hockey League
- Founded: 2003
- Folded: 2007
- Colours: white, blue

Franchise history
- 1999–2003: Beatrice Aeros
- 2003–2006: Toronto Aeros
- 2006–2007: Mississauga Aeros

The Toronto Aeros, often called Beatrice Aeros after their primary sponsor, the North York Aeros, and the Mississauga Aeros were a semi-professional women's ice hockey team that played in Toronto and Mississauga, Ontario. The team played its home games in Beatrice Ice Gardens in Toronto and Iceland Mississauga in Mississauga. In 2010, the Canadian Women's Hockey League (CWHL) placed an expansion team back in Toronto and was sometimes known as the Aeros among fans. In 2011, the CWHL team eventually took on the name of Toronto Furies.

== Team history ==
Originally from North York, Ontario, the senior Aeros were established in the Central Ontario Women's Hockey League and the Ontario Women's Hockey Association as the Aeros. The senior team was associated with an organization that operated several teams from youth to adult. Throughout the organization's history, the senior Aeros have also been known as the Toronto Aeros and North York Aeros. In 1999, the organization was renamed the Beatrice Aeros after their main sponsor, Beatrice Foods Canada, whose home rink was the Beatrice Ice Gardens at York University.

The senior Aeros joined the National Women's Hockey League (NWHL) upon its launch in 1998. On March 22, 1998, Dana Antal scored at 5:31 of a 10-minute overtime period on a pass from Jennifer Botterill as Team Alberta (represented by the Calgary Oval X-Treme) defeated Team Ontario (represented by the Beatrice Aeros) by a 3–2 mark to win the Esso Women's Nationals.

During the 1999–2000 NWHL season, the Beatrice Aeros played the Sainte-Julie Pantheres in the championship game. In the second game of the final, Cherie Piper scored the game-winning goal with 9:06 left to play in the first period, and Lauren Goldstein earned the shutout for the Aeros. With the 1–0 win, Beatrice earned the championship based on goal differential.

The team changed its name in 2003 to become the Toronto Aeros. In 2006–07 they relocated to Mississauga and changed their name to the Mississauga Aeros. They played their home games at the Beatrice Ice Gardens at York University in Toronto.

After one season in Mississauga, the NWHL and the senior Aeros ceased operations in 2007. The Canadian Women's Hockey League subsequently was created from the remnants of the NWHL. As part of the new league's reorganization, the NWHL's Oakville Ice returned to affiliating with the Mississauga Chiefs hockey organization and took the Mississauga Aeros place in the new league for 2007–08. The Mississauga Chiefs played for three seasons before the CWHL restructured completely, folding the Chiefs team while subsequently placing a new team in Toronto, which then acquired many of the former Chiefs' players including Jennifer Botterill and Sami Jo Small. While officially the 2010–11 Toronto CWHL team had no name, but would sometimes be called the "Toronto Aeros" in the media. The CWHL team adopted the name Toronto Furies after their appearance 2011 Clarkson Cup.

== Season-by-season ==
Year	GP	W	L	T	GF	GA	Pts	Finish	Playoffs
1998–99	40	37	2	1	189	39	75	1st West Div.	Eliminated in first round
1999–00	40	35	3	2	217	37	72	1st West Div.	Won NWHL Championship
2000–01	40	35	2	3	222	48	73	1st West Div.	Won NWHL Championship
2001–02	30	23	2	5	149	39	51	1st West Div.	Won NWHL Championship
2002–03	36	32	3	1	201	54	65	1st Central Div.	Lost NWHL Championship
2003–04	36	33	2	1	197	42	67	1st Central Div.	Eliminated in first round
2004–05	36	24	8	4	142	68	54	2nd Central Div.	Won NWHL Championship
2005–06	36	13	19	4	114	127	32	4th Central Div.	Did not qualify
2006–07	21	15	6	0	107	51	31	2nd NWHL	Eliminated in first round

== Notable former players ==
#	Player	Hometown	Tenure
17	(Canada) Jennifer Botterill (F)	Ottawa, Ontario	1998–1999, 2003–2007
77	(Canada) Cassie Campbell (F)	Brampton, Ontario	1998–2000
34	(Canada) Nicole Corriero (F)	Thornhill, Ontario	Played for the junior team
9	(Canada) Gillian Ferrari (D)	Thornhill, Ontario	1998–2004
91	(Canada) Geraldine Heaney (D)	Weston, Ontario	1998–2006
8	(Canada) Angela James (C)	Toronto, Ontario	1992–2000
71	(Canada) Becky Kellar (D)	Hagersville, Ontario	1998–2004
14	(Canada) Cherie Piper (F)	Scarborough, Ontario	1999–2001
11	(Canada) Cheryl Pounder (D)	Toronto, Ontario	1998–2007
17	(Finland) Sari Krooks (F)		1988–1999

== Honours ==
- The Abby Hoffman Cup (Canadian champions): 1990-91, 1992-93, 1999-2000, 2003-04, 2004-05
- Ontario Women's Hockey Association (Ontario AAA champions): 1988-89, 1989-90, 1990-91, 1991-92, 1992-93, 1993-94, 1995-96, 1996-97, 1997-98, 1998-99, 1999-2000, 2000-01, 2001-02, 2003-04, 2006-07
- NWHL Cup (playoff champion): 1999-2000, 2000-01, 2001-02, 2002-03, 2004-05
- NWHL Central Division (regular season): 1998-99, 1999-2000, 2000-01, 2001-02, 2002-03, 2003-04, 2006-07
