= 2005–06 NWHL season =

== Final standings ==
Note: GP = Games played, W = Wins, L = Losses, T = Ties, OTL = Overtime losses, GF = Goals for, GA = Goals against, Pts = Points.

Eastern Division
No.	Team	GP	W	L	T	OTL	GF	GA	Pts
1	Ottawa Raiders	36	21	8	4	3	122	77	49
2	Montreal Axion	36	14	17	3	2	100	122	33
3	Quebec Avalanche	36	4	28	2	2	58	135	12

Central Division
No.	Team	GP	W	L	T	OTL	GF	GA	Pts
1	Durham Lightning	36	23	6	5	2	107	74	53
2	Brampton Thunder	36	19	12	5	0	113	97	43
3	Oakville Ice	36	20	14	1	1	118	100	42
4	Toronto Aeros	36	13	17	4	2	114	127	32

== Playoffs ==
- Montreal Axion 1, Brampton Thunder 0

The Montreal Axion won the Championship of the NWHL.

== See also ==
- National Women's Hockey League (1999–2007) (NWHL)
