= Mississauga Chiefs =

Former Canadian NWHL and CWHL ice hockey team

- City: Mississauga, Ontario, Canada
- League: Central Ontario Women's Hockey League (1993–1998); National Women's Hockey League (1998–2007); Canadian Women's Hockey League (2007–2010)
- Founded: 1993
- Folded: 2010
- Home arena: Hershey Centre and Iceland Mississauga
- Colours: Dark blue, pale blue and white
- General manager: Jim Holman (last)
- Head coach: Rick Osborne (last)

Franchise history
- 1993–2000: Mississauga Chiefs
- 2000–2003: Mississauga Ice Bears
- 2003–2007: Oakville Ice
- 2007–2010: Mississauga Chiefs

The Mississauga Chiefs were a professional women's ice hockey team that played in the Canadian National Women's Hockey League (NWHL) and the Canadian Women's Hockey League (CWHL). They played in Mississauga, Ontario at the Hershey Centre and the Iceland Mississauga in the Greater Toronto Area. Founded as the Mississauga Chiefs in 1993, the team was known as the Mississauga Ice Bears during 2000 to 2003 and as the Oakville Ice during 2003 to 2007.

== History ==
The Mississauga Chiefs were founded in 1993 in the Central Ontario Women's Hockey League (COWHL) where they played for five seasons. In 1998, the COWHL was reorganized and became the National Women's Hockey League (NWHL). The team changed their name to Mississauga Ice Bears from 2000 to 2003 and the Oakville Ice from 2003 to 2007. In 2007–08, the NWHL disbanded and the clubs were re-organized to join the Canadian Women's Hockey League (CWHL). As part of the new league, the Oakville Ice merged with the Mississauga Aeros to re-affiliate with the Chiefs' hockey organization to become the Mississauga Chiefs again. In 2008, they were the CWHL championship runner-up to the Brampton Thunder. The Chiefs participated in the 2010 Clarkson Cup. In 2010–11, the CWHL was restructured and reduced the number of its teams to five, eliminating the Mississauga Chiefs and two other teams, and created a new Toronto team that acquired several former Chiefs players including Jennifer Botterill and Sami Jo Small.

The Chiefs' name continued to be used by the organization for their Mississauga Jr. Chiefs and youth girls' programs.

== Season-by-season ==
Year	GP	W	L	T	GF	GA	Pts	Finish	Playoffs
1998–99	40	23	15	2	117	75	48	3rd, Western Div.	Eliminated in first round
1999–00	40	21	13	6	133	79	48	3rd, Western Div.	Did not qualify
2000–01	40	21	16	3	107	97	45	3rd, Western Div.	Did not qualify
2001–02	30	12	10	8	82	81	32	2nd, Western Div.	
2002–03	26	19	14	3	122	111	42	3rd, Central Div.	
2003–04	36	17	17	2	118	99	36	3rd, Central Div.	
2004–05	36	13	17	6	97	99	34	3rd, Central Div.	
2005–06	36	20	15	1	118	100	42	3rd, Central Div.	
2006–07	21	15	6	0	107	51	31	5th, NWHL	Eliminated in first round
2007–08	30	21	8	1	115	61	43	2nd, Central Div.	Lost in finals
2008–09	26	16	8	2	—	—	34	3rd, CWHL	Lost in finals
2009–10	30	21	8	1	—	—	43	2nd, CWHL	Qualified for 2010 Clarkson Cup without playoffs

== Clarkson Cup 2010 ==
- 2010 Clarkson Cup semifinals

Date	Participants	Score
March 27, 2009	Minnesota Whitecaps vs. Mississauga Chiefs	Minnesota, 3–0

== Former staff ==
- General manager: Jim Holman
- Assistant general manager: Lori Friesen
- Head coach: Rick Osborne
- Assistant coaches: Bruce Rose and Bill Campbell

== Notable players ==
- Jennifer Botterill
- Cherie Piper
- Cheryl Pounder
- Sami Jo Small

== Awards winners ==
- Jennifer Botterill, Angela James Bowl (2008)
- Jennifer Botterill, Central Division All-Star (2008)
- Jennifer Botterill, CWHL Top Forward (2008)

== Honours ==
- The Abby Hoffman Cup (Canadian champions): 2007-08
- Ontario Women's Hockey Association (Ontario champions): 1994-95
