= Vaughan Flames =

The Vaughan Flames was a professional women's ice hockey team in the Canadian Women's Hockey League (CWHL). The team played its home games at Vaughan Sports Village in Vaughan, Ontario, Canada.

== History ==
In 1995 the Vaughan Flames joined the Ontario Women's Hockey Association (OWHA). Since 1995, the Vaughan Flames have grown to accommodate teams in all levels of play, including Senior. The club joined the National Women's Hockey League (NWHL) in 1999. The Team adopted different names: Clearnet Lightning (1999 to 2001), Telus Lightning (2001 to 2006), Durham Lightning (2005–2006) and Etobicoke Dolphins in 2006–07 (the last season of NWHL). In 2007 the Vaughan Flames joined the Canadian Women's Hockey League (CWHL). In 2010 it was announced that the CWHL would reduce the number of its teams to five. The Vaughan Flames team will no longer be playing in the CWHL, while the intermediates and other young level programs continue.

== Season-by-season ==
in National Women's Hockey League (NWHL):

in Canadian Women's Hockey League (CWHL):

Year by year
Year	GP	W	L	T	GF	GA	Pts
1999–2000	40	4	33	3	44	249	11
2000–01	40	5	34	1	77	219	11
2001–02	30	4	18	8	59	120	16
2002–03	36	0	35	1	54	236	2
2003–04	36	8	28	0	66	224	16
2004–05	36	4	28	4	72	189	12
2005–06	36	23	8	5	107	74	53
2006–07	20	15	3	2	87	66	64
2007–08	30	12	16	2	69	101	26
2008–09	25	4	19	2	n/a	n/a	10
2009–10	29	9	19	1	n/a	n/a	19

Note: GP = Games played, W = Wins, L = Losses, T = Ties, GF = Goals for, GA = Goals against, Pts = Points.

== Season standings ==
= Indicates First Place finish

= Indicates championship

Year	League	Regular season	Playoffs
1999–2000	National Women's Hockey League	4th, Western Division	no participation to playoff
2000–01	National Women's Hockey League	5th, Western Division	no participation to playoff
2001–02	National Women's Hockey League	4th, Western Division	no participation to playoff
2002–03	National Women's Hockey League	4th, Central Division	no participation to playoff
2003–04	National Women's Hockey League	4th, Central Division	no participation to playoff
2004–05	National Women's Hockey League	4th, Central Division	no participation to playoff
2005–06	National Women's Hockey League	1st, Central Division	eliminated in first round
2006–07	National Women's Hockey League	1st (only one division now)	eliminated in first round
2007–08	Canadian Women's Hockey League	3rd, Central Division	eliminated in first round
2008–09	Canadian Women's Hockey League	5th, last place	no participation to playoff
2009–10	Canadian Women's Hockey League	5th, last place	no participation to playoff

== Last roster (2009–10) ==
Goalies
Number		Player	Former Team	Hometown
33	(Canada)	Kendra Fischer		Kincardine, Ontario
29	(Canada)	Stephanie Lockert		Thunder Bay, Ontario

Defense
Number		Player	Former Team	Hometown
67	(Canada)	Lauren Meschino		Montreal, Quebec
42	(Canada)	Krista McArthur		Alliston, Ontario
5	(Canada)	Jess Clermont		Saugeen Shores, Ontario
4	(Canada)	Michelle Bonello		Mississauga, Ontario

Forwards
Number		Player	Former Team	Hometown
71	(Canada)	Samantha Shirley		Mississauga, Ontario
64	(Canada)	Danielle Ayearst		Whistler, British Columbia
27	(Canada)	Emily Berzins		Fort Mcmurray, ALberta
20	(Canada)	Claire Mckimm		
16	(Canada)	Amy Jack		Brampton, Ontario
15	(Canada)	Melanie Mills		Brampton, Ontario
14	(Canada)	LaToya Clarke		Pickering, Ontario
11	(Canada)	Danielle Blanchard		Newmarket, Ontario
9	(Canada)	Joanne Eustace		Torbay, Newfoundland
6	(Canada)	Meagan Aarts		Watford, Ontario
	(Canada)	Jenn Wakefield	Canada National Team	Pickering, Ontario

== Coaching staff 2009–10 ==
- General Manager: Barb Fisher and Brandon Smith,
- Head Coach: Bart Blair
- Assistant Coach: Gord Holdgate,
- Assistant Coach: Eric Love,
- Assistant Coach: Amanda Reid,
- Equipment Manager: Lester Tiu,
- Head Therapist: Sharlton Hercules
- Trainer: Jackie Raposo,

== Notable former players ==
- Kerry Weiland USA National Team

She played with Vaughan Flames in season 2007–08.

- Chloe Milano

York University
Rookie All Star Team – 2008/09

- Jenn Wakefield Canada National Team

She played with Vaughan Flames in season 2009–10.

== See also ==
- Canadian Women's Hockey League (CWHL)
- National Women's Hockey League (NWHL) was in service between 1998 and 2007.
