= National Women's Hockey League (1999–2007) =

North American women's hockey league

- Sport: Ice hockey
- Founded: 1999
- Folded: 2007
- Countries: Canada; United States

The National Women's Hockey League (NWHL) was a women's ice hockey league established in Canada in service from 1999 to 2007. In its final season the league was run by the Ontario Women's Hockey Association.

== History ==
The NWHL superseded the old Central Ontario Women's Hockey League in 1998–99. After the old COWHL dropped down to three teams in 1997–98, the new league expanded to Brampton, Ottawa and the Montreal area (Montreal, Bonaventure and Laval) in 1998–99. The league was officially renamed the National Women's Hockey League on February 16, 1999 with Susan Fennell as the league's first president/Commissioner. In the inaugural season, the Beatrice Aeros won the West Division while the Bonaventure Wingstar won the East Division. Under Commissioner Fennell, the NWHL transformed to independent owners with the League negotiating to have cross Canada live television broadcast for the finals. Michael Charbon (MAC Productions) worked with the Commissioner to secure broadcast times with WTN. Games were played in Brampton's Powerade Centre (now called "The CAA Centre"), coinciding with the Brampton Canadettes world's largest hockey tournament, which brought together teams from all ages and from across North America to compete. A special highlight was attending the Championship Cup games of the NWHL.

Michael Charbon designed the NWHL Logo in the same colors of the NHL logo. Commissioner Fennell sought the approval from Gary Bettman, the NHL Commissioner, and it was granted.

Commissioner Fennell was instrumental in having the Championship Cup purchased and engraved annually with the Champion Team players names, coaches, and even volunteers.

During the NHL strike there was talk that the women should be able to play for the Stanley Cup. Instead, Commissioner Fennell initiated talks with Governor General Adrianne Clarkson and requested consideration to rename the Championship Cup the "Clarkson Cup" as the late Governor General Lord Stanley had done for the NHL years before.

The NWHL league lasted nine years before it disbanded one year after Commissioner Fennell retired 2006 after balancing Mayoral duties and growing a professional sports league. Mayor Fennell signed over all legal instruments for the NWHL to the Ontario Women's Hockey Association (OWHA) to lead the next steps. However, one season later, following the 2006–07 season, all existing owners quit and it appeared there would be no league.

In 2007–08, players from the old NWHL joined new teams in similar markets in the newly formed Canadian Women's Hockey League.

== Structure ==
From the 1998–99 to the 2001–02 seasons, the NWHL consisted of two divisions: the Eastern Division with Quebec-based teams, and the Western Division with Ontario-based teams.

For the 2002–03 and 2003–04 seasons, the league had three divisions: the Eastern Division with Quebec-based teams, a renamed Central Division with Ontario-based teams, and a new Western Division with teams in Alberta (both seasons) and British Columbia (2002–03 only). The high travel costs for the two Alberta teams caused them to leave the NWHL to form the Western Women's Hockey League, reducing the NWHL to the Eastern and Central Divisions for the 2004–05 and 2005–06 seasons.

The WWHL had five teams, in Alberta, British Columbia, Saskatchewan and Minnesota, for its own 2004–05 and 2005–06 seasons. The WWHL agreed to merge with the NWHL for the 2006–07 NWHL season. The NWHL reverted to three divisions: Eastern Division with Quebec-based teams, the Central Division with Ontario-based teams, and a renewed Western Division with teams Alberta, British Columbia, Saskatchewan and Minnesota. The Eastern and Central Division teams scheduled a 35-game unbalanced but interlocking schedule, while the Western Division would only play within itself for the regular season - saving travel costs for all three divisions. The merger broke down midseason, with the WWHL teams treating it as the 2006–07 WWHL season and the remaining NWHL teams handling their playoffs with all four teams from the Central Division and the top two teams from the Eastern Division qualifying for the postseason. In the NWHL playoffs, teams played a best-of-three series to determine the Eastern and Central Division champions, who then met for the NWHL championship. By the end of the 2006–07 NWHL season, the league had fallen into disarray, season records are incomplete, and the league folded shortly after the Central Division's Brampton Thunder defeated the Eastern Division's Montreal Axion to win the last ever NWHL Championship.

== NWHL Franchises ==
The following is list of franchises which existed in all three divisions of the now defunct National Women's Hockey League.

=== Eastern Division ===
- Montreal Axion, Montreal, Quebec (2003–07)
  - Montreal Wingstar (1999–2003)
  - Bonaventure Wingstar (1998–99)
- Montreal Jofa Titan, Montreal, Quebec (1998–99)
- Ottawa Raiders, Ottawa, Ontario (1999–2007)
  - National Capital Raiders (1998–99)
  - note: to CWHL as Ottawa Capital Canucks
- Quebec Avalanche, Laval, Quebec (2002–07)
  - Metropol Le Cheyenne (2001–02)
  - Sainte-Julie Pantheres (1999–2001)
- Laval Le Mistral, Laval, Québec (1998–2001)

=== Western (1998–2002), Central (2002–2007) Division ===
- Brampton Thunder, Brampton, Ontario (1998–2007)
  - note: to CWHL as Brampton Canadette Thunder
- Oakville Ice, Oakville, Ontario (2003–07)
  - Mississauga Ice Bears (2000–2003)
  - Mississauga Chiefs (1998–2000)
  - note: to CWHL as Mississauga Chiefs
- Etobicoke Dolphins, Toronto, Ontario (2006–07)
  - Telus Lightning (2001–06)
  - Clearnet Lightning (1999–2001)
  - note: to CWHL as Vaughan Flames
- Mississauga Aeros, Mississauga, Ontario (2006–07)
  - Toronto Aeros (2003–06)
  - Beatrice Aeros (1998–2003)
- Toronto Sting (2000–01)
  - Scarborough Sting (1998–2000)

=== Western Division (2002–2004, 2006–2007) ===
- Vancouver Griffins (2002–03)
- Calgary Oval X-Treme, Calgary, Alberta (2002–04, partial 2006–07 season, reverted to WWHL)
- Edmonton Chimos, Edmonton, Alberta (2002–04, partial 2006–07 season, reverted to WWHL)
- British Columbia Breakers, Langley, British Columbia (partial 2006–07 season, reverted to WWHL)
- Strathmore Rockies, Strathmore, Alberta (partial 2006–07 season, reverted to WWHL)
- Saskatchewan Prairie Ice, Saskatoon, Saskatchewan (partial 2006–07 season, reverted to WWHL)
- Minnesota Whitecaps, Brooklyn Center, Minnesota (partial 2006–07 season, reverted to WWHL)

== Championship ==
During its inaugural 1998–99 season, a playoff tournament was held over three consecutive days, resulting in the presentation of a gold, silver and bronze medal.

For the next six seasons, the playoff champion was awarded the NWHL Champions Cup.

For its final two seasons, the championship winner was awarded the Clarkson Cup. Though the NWHL and the Western Women's Hockey League (WWHL) were considered merged for the 2006–07 season, the WWHL teams did not compete for the Clarkson Cup, instead playing for the WWHL Champions Cup.

After the 2007 disbanding of the NWHL, the Clarkson Cup was presented to the winner of a playoff between WWHL and Canadian Women's Hockey League (CWHL) teams, then solely to the CWHL champion after the WWHL merged with that league.

A list of NWHL Championship winners and the team they met in the final:

Season	Champion	Finalist	Place
1998–99	Brampton Thunder	Bonaventure Wingstar	Brampton
1999–2000	Beatrice Aeros	Sainte-Julie Pantheres	Brampton
2000–01	Beatrice Aeros	Sainte-Julie Pantheres	Brampton
2001–02	Beatrice Aeros	Brampton Thunder	Brampton
2002–03	Calgary Oval X-Treme	Beatrice Aeros	Brampton
2003–04	Calgary Oval X-Treme	Brampton Thunder	Brampton
2004–05	Toronto Aeros	Montreal Axion	Brampton
2005–06	Montreal Axion	Brampton Thunder	Brampton
2006–07	Brampton Thunder	Montreal Axion	Brampton

== Scoring champions ==
- 2006–07 – Jayna Hefford, Brampton Thunder
- 2005–06 – Sommer West, Toronto Aeros
- 2004–05 – Jayna Hefford, Brampton Thunder
- 2003–04 – Jayna Hefford, Brampton Thunder
- 2002–03 – Jayna Hefford, Brampton Thunder
- 2001–02 – Amy Turek, Beatrice Aeros
- 2000–01 – Jayna Hefford, Brampton Thunder & Amy Turek, Beatrice Aeros
- 1999–00 – Karen Nystrom, Brampton Thunder
- 1998–99 – Stephanie Boyd, Brampton Thunder

== Goal-scoring champions ==
- 2006–07 – Jayna Hefford, Brampton Thunder
- 2005–06 – Sommer West, Toronto Aeros
- 2004–05 – Jayna Hefford, Brampton Thunder
- 2003–04 – Jayna Hefford, Brampton Thunder
- 2002–03 – Jayna Hefford, Brampton Thunder
- 2001–02 – Amy Turek, Beatrice Aeros
- 2000–01 – Jayna Hefford, Brampton Thunder
- 1999–00 – Karen Nystrom, Brampton Thunder
- 1998–99 – Angela James, Beatrice Aeros

== See also ==
- Canadian Women's Hockey League
- Western Women's Hockey League
