= Ottawa Senators Women's Hockey Club =

Ottawa Senators Women's Hockey Club Intermediate AA
- City: Ottawa, Ontario
- League: OWHL
- Founded: 1998
- Home arena: Bell Sensplex
- Colours: Black, Red, Gold, White
- Head coach: Reagan Fischer
- Website: oswh.ca

Franchise history
- 1998-1999: National Capital Raiders
- 1999-2007: Ottawa Raiders
- 2007-2008: Ottawa Capital Canucks
- 2008-Present: Ottawa Senators Women's Hockey Club

The Ottawa Senators Women's Hockey Club is a women's ice hockey organization, based in Ottawa, Ontario, Canada. The organization organizes teams in several age divisions, including Intermediate in the Ontario Women's Hockey League (OWHL). The women's senior-level ice hockey team formerly played in the Canadian Women's Hockey League (CWHL), until 2010. The senior team was formerly known as the Ottawa Capital Canucks and the Ottawa Raiders.

== History ==
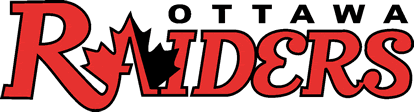
Logo of the Ottawa Raiders

The club began as the National Capital Raiders in 1998, becoming the Ottawa Raiders in 1999. The club played in the National Women's Hockey League (NWHL) from 1999 until 2007, when the league folded. In 2007-08, the club re-organized as the Ottawa Capital Canucks, playing in the CWHL. For the 2007–08 season, the team played at the Sandy Hill Arena in central Ottawa.

In 2008, the Canucks team merged its operations with the Kanata Girls Hockey Association. The new organization was named the Ottawa Senators Women's Hockey Club, was partly sponsored by the Ottawa Senators NHL club, and operated three teams. The Senior AAA team played in the CWHL, the Intermediate team was the first to join the Provincial Women's Hockey League, and there is a Midget AA team that plays a tournament schedule. The new organization is based out of the Bell Sensplex in the Kanata suburb of Ottawa.

In 2010, it was announced that the CWHL would reduce its number of teams to five. The Senior AAA Ottawa Senators were disbanded and are no longer playing in the CWHL. The Intermediates and other level programs continue, and the Intermediate AA team became a member of the Provincial Women's Hockey League. The Provincial Women's Hockey League is now called the Ontario Women's Hockey League U22 Elite.

== Notable alumni ==
At the Intermediate AA level; (Canada) denotes senior national team alumnus

- (Czech Republic) Kateřina Bukolská – HC Berounské Lvice, HC Slavia Praha, HC Příbram, Leksands IF
- Fannie Desforges – Montreal Stars
- (Canada) Erica Howe – Markham Thunder, PWHL Toronto
- Rebecca Leslie – Calgary Inferno, PWHL Toronto, Ottawa Charge
- Amanda Leveille – Buffalo Beauts, Minnesota Whitecaps, Minnesota Frost
- Stefanie McKeough
- (Canada) Jamie Lee Rattray – Markham Thunder, Boston Fleet
