= 2010–11 Montreal Stars season =

Season of Canadian ice hockey team

The 2010–11 Montreal Stars season is the fourth in the history of the franchise. The Stars compete in the Canadian Women's Hockey League and will attempt to win its second Clarkson Cup in franchise history.

== Offseason ==
- September 11: The Centre Etienne Desmarteau in Montreal, Québec, named one of the rinks in the arena in Caroline Ouellette's honour.

== News and notes ==
- November 20–21: Montreal swept Brampton in a 2-game series. The battle between the top two teams in the Canadian Women's Hockey League resulted in Montreal remaining undefeated. The November 20 game involved a pre-game salute. Montreal recognized Angela James, the Head Coach of Brampton for her historic induction into the Hockey Hall of Fame, and held a minute of silence for the passing of Pat Burns at the Étienne Desmarteau Arena.
- December 19: The Blades came from behind to defeat Montreal. In doing so, they broke up Montreal's bid for an undefeated season. Boston goalie Mandy Cronin stopped 74 shots to lead Boston to victory. Montreal had an early 2–0 lead. In the 2nd period, Blades player Sam Faber scored on an assist by Jess Koizumi. In the third period, Koizumi would tie the game. With 3:24 to play in the game, Angela Ruggiero scored the game-winning goal. She was assisted by Sam Faber and Haley Moore.
- Mélodie Daoust was called up as an emergency fill-in with the Montreal Stars. The nineteen-year-old scored three points in her CWHL debut on January 8 (versus the Burlington Barracudas).
- January 18, 2011: The Brampton Thunder competed against the Montreal Stars at the Invista Centre in Kingston, Ontario. This is team captain Jayna Hefford's hometown and she scored a goal in front of her closest friends, family and fans. In addition, her number 15 was raised to the rafters of the Invista Centre on behalf of the Kingston Area Minor Hockey Association. As of 2012, no sweaters bearing Hefford's number will be used in Kingston Minor Hockey.
- January 25: Lisa-Marie Breton-Lebreux was named to the CWHL Board of Directors for 2011.

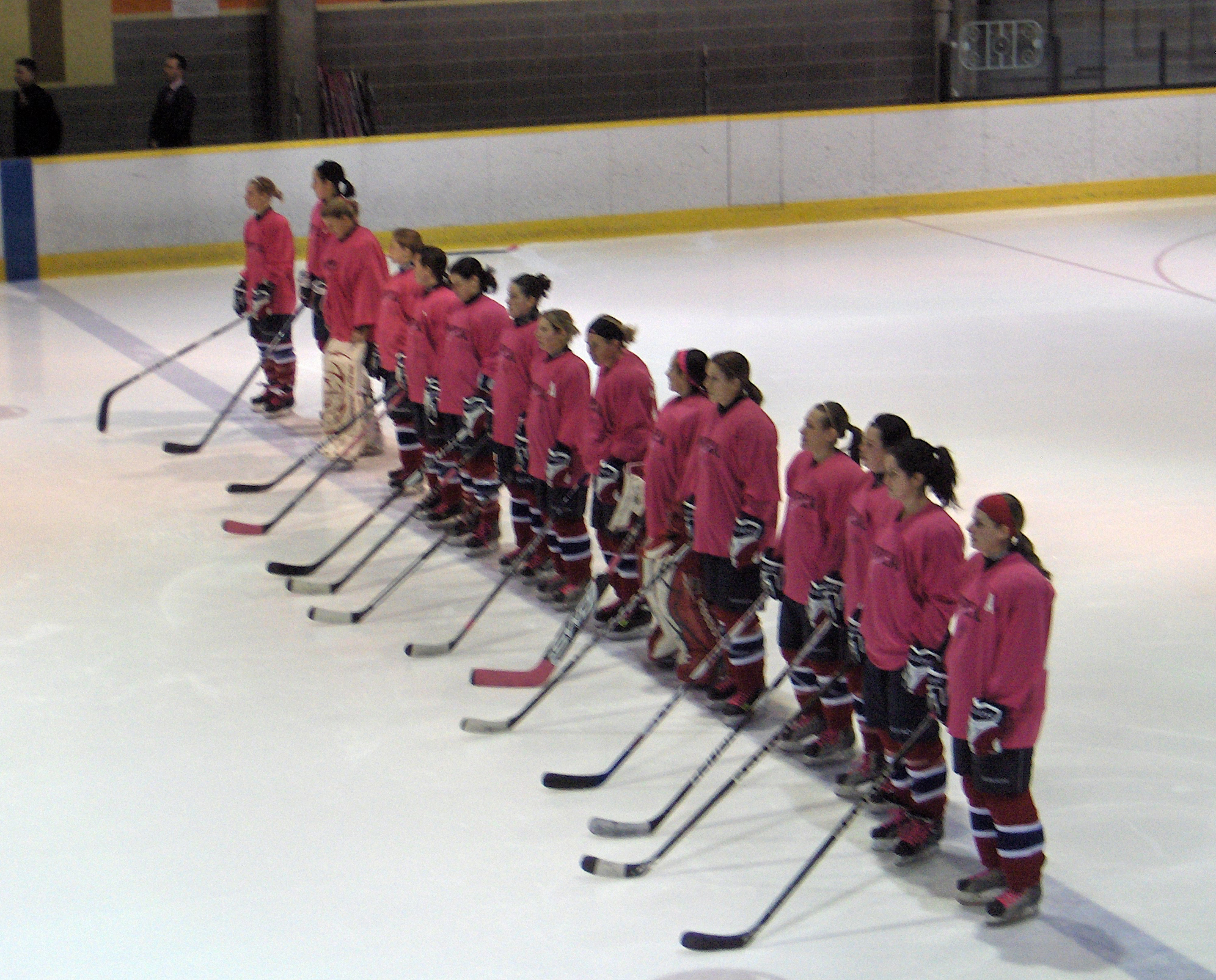
Montreal Stars played to beat breast cancer

- January 29: Montreal raised awareness and funds for the Fondation du cancer du sein du Québec (FCSQ). The game featured the Montreal club in pink at Centre Etienne Desmarteau versus the Boston Blades. Montreal prevailed by a 3–0 score (goals scored by: Stephanie Denino, Sarah Vaillancourt and Tawnya Davis). 800 persons came to support the cause: A record of attendance for a match of Montreal Stars at Montreal. 5000 $ were amassed for the Foundation of the breast cancer during this match.
- February 5, 6, 12 and 13: Montreal Stars played a series of home games at the Centre multisports de Châteauguay (arena Léo-Crépin), hometown of Kim St-Pierre.

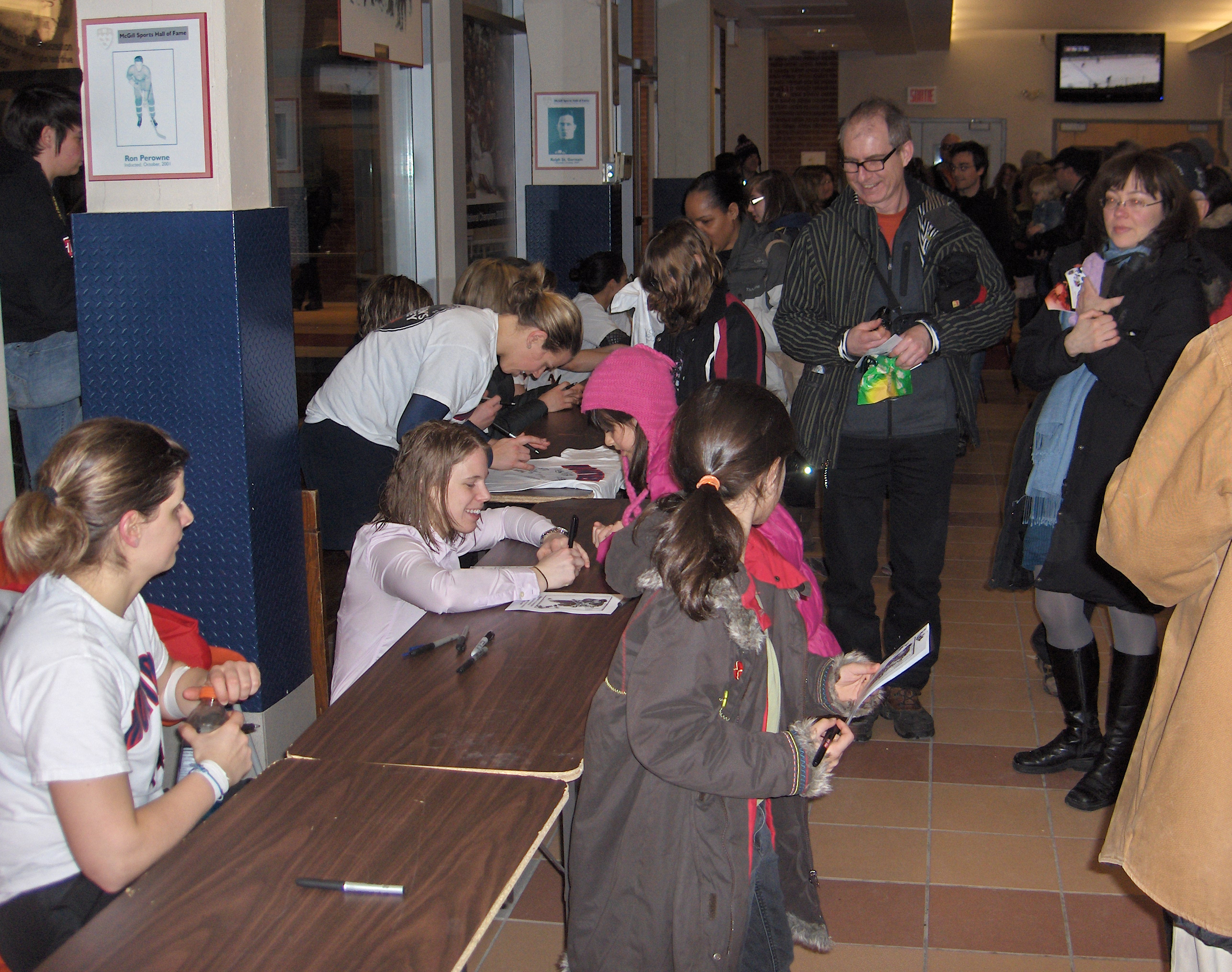
To acknowledge the support of their fans throughout the season, Montreal Stars dedicated Saturday 12 March to them

- February 26 & 27: Montreal Stars finished their regular season with two exciting wins against Boston this weekend, solidifying their fifth consecutive victory and the top spot in the league. The final score Saturday was 5–4, and Sunday, 4–1
- March 11, 12 & 13: Montreal Stars will host the first playoff round of the season in Montreal on March 11, 12 and 13. The locations for the games are Friday March 11, 4:30 PM at Ed Meagher Arena (Concordia University), Saturday March 12, 6:00 PM at McConnell Arena (McGill University), and Sunday March 13 1:30 PM at Leo Crepin Arena, Châteauguay (near Montreal).
- Saturday 12 March, Montreal Stars are celebrating Fan Appreciation Night! The team will be thanking fans for an awesome season with free souvenir programs, cool prizes to win, and an autograph session with players, after the game!

== Regular season ==
=== Schedule ===
Date	Teams	Score
October 23, 2010	Montreal @ Burlington	Montreal, 7–0
October 24, 2010	Montreal @ Brampton	Montreal, 6–5
October 30, 2010	Toronto @ Montreal	Montreal, 5–3
October 31, 2010	Toronto @ Montreal	Montreal, 5–4
November 27, 2010	Montreal @ Boston	Montreal, 3–2
November 28, 2010	Montreal @ Boston	Montreal, 4–2
December 12, 2010	Montreal @ Brampton	Montreal 7–0
December 18, 2010	Boston @ Montreal	Montreal, 10–2
December 19, 2010	Boston @ Montreal	Boston, 3–2
January 8, 2011	Burlington @ Montreal	Montreal 9–3
January 9, 2011	Burlington @ Montreal	Montreal 3–1
January 15, 2011	Montreal @ Toronto	Toronto 3–2
January 16, 2011	Montreal @ Burlington	Montreal 4–3
January 29, 2011	Boston @ Montreal	Montreal 3–0
January 30, 2011	Boston @ Montreal	Boston 6–5
February 5, 2011	Burlington @ Montreal	Montreal 6–3
February 6, 2011	Burlington @ Montreal	Montreal 5–4
February 12, 2011	Toronto @ Montreal	Toronto 5–4
February 13, 2011	Toronto @ Montreal	Montreal 3–0
February 19, 2011	Montreal @ Toronto	Montreal 4–2
February 20, 2011	Montreal @ Brampton	Montreal 6–5
February 26, 2011	Montreal @ Boston	Montreal 5–4
February 20, 2011	Montreal @ Boston	Montreal 4–1

=== Standings ===
Note: GP = Games played, W = Wins, L = Losses, T = Ties, OTL = Overtime losses, GF = Goals for, GA = Goals against, Pts = Points.

February 28, 2011
No.	Team	GP	W	L	OTL	GF	GA	Pts
1	Montreal	26	22	2	2	125	70	46
2	Brampton	26	19	6	1	111	69	39
3	Boston	26	10	15	1	73	101	21
4	Toronto	26	8	13	5	83	98	21
5	Burlington	26	6	18	2	54	108	14

=== Notables players 2010–11 ===
- Kim St-Pierre – Best goalie in the CWHL
- Caroline Ouellette – First Leading scorer in the CWHL
- Noemie Marin – 4th leading scorer in the CWHL
- Emmanuelle Blais – 5th leading scorer in the CWHL
- Julie Chu – 5th leading scorer in the CWHL
- Annie Guay – 7th leading scorer and only Defencemen in the top 10 scoring leaders
- Sarah Vaillancourt – 9th leading scorer in the CWHL

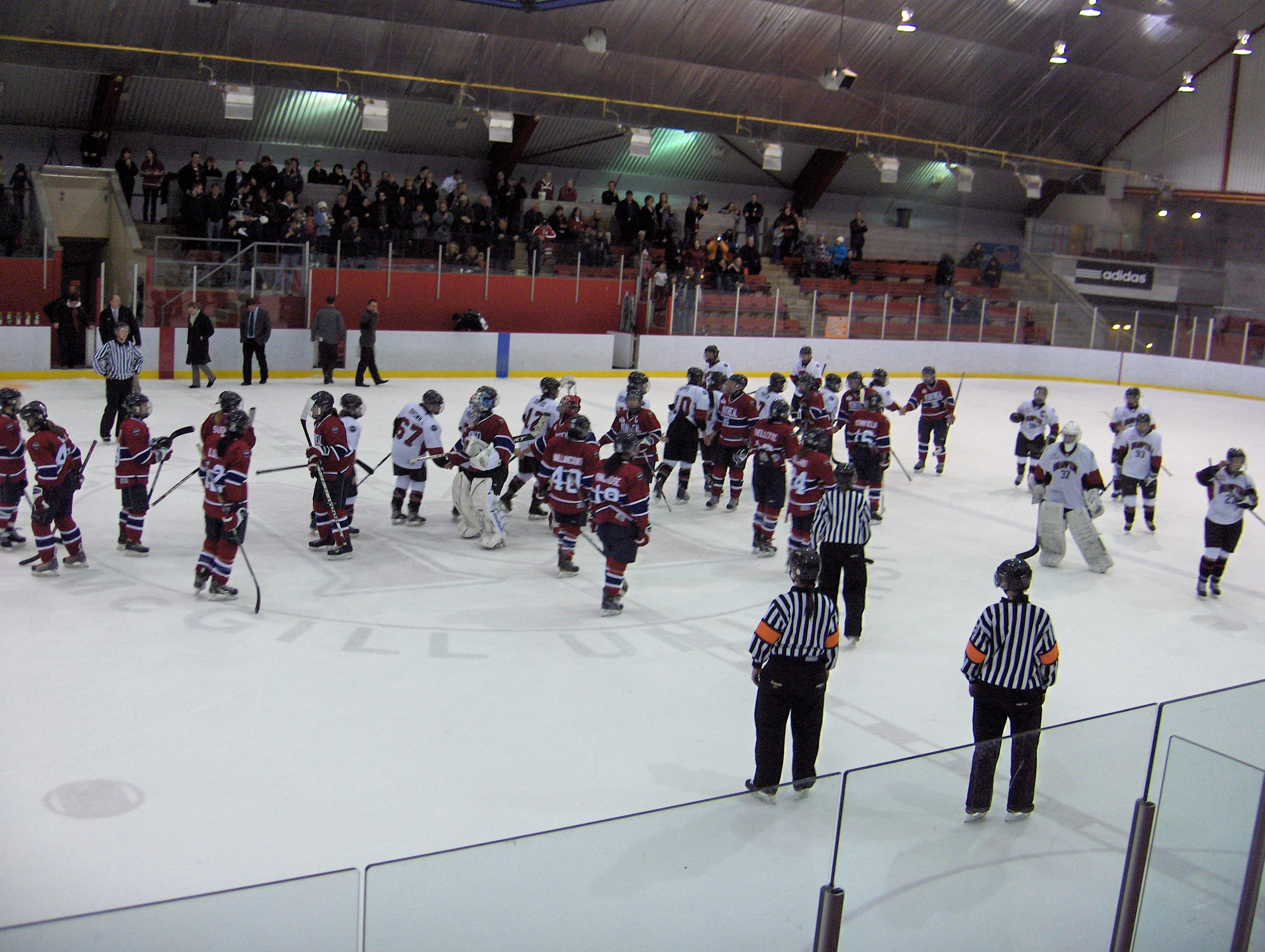
Brampton – Montreal: 2 matches with fast rhythm

== Postseason ==
The Montreal team defeated Brampton in the 2011 playoffs to win the CWHL Championship. Montreal then advanced to play in the Clarkson Cup Championship.

Date	Opponent	Score	Attendance
March 11, 2011	Brampton	Montreal wins 2–1 (in Shootout time)	100 supporters
March 12, 2011	Brampton	Montreal wins 4–3	200 supporters
March 13, 2011	Brampton	a 3rd match is non-necessary . Montreal gains the first 2 matches	–

== Clarkson cup ==
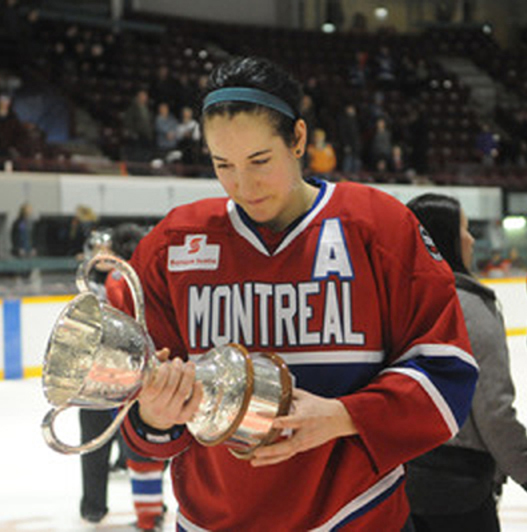
Caroline Ouellette with Clarkson Cup on March 27, 2011

This year, the Clarkson Cup Championship include three teams from the Canadian Women's Hockey League and the champion team of the Western Women's Hockey League.

Montreal first game: The Stars wins 5 to 1 against Minnesota Whitecaps. In the second game, Sarah Vaillancourt scored 3 goals to lead Montreal to a 7–4 victory over Brampton. Saturday, the third day of the tournament, Montreal Stars scored a crucial victory 2–1 against Toronto. This win guarantees Montreal a place in the Clarkson Cup final, on Sunday against Toronto, who also recorded two victories in the tournament.

Date	Time	Teams	Final score	Attendance
March 24	12:00 noon	Toronto vs Brampton	Toronto 3–2	100 supporters
March 24	6:00 pm	Minnesota vs Montreal	Montreal 5–1	240 supporteurs
March 25	12:00 noon	Minnesota vs Toronto	Toronto 6–0	300 supporters
March 25	7:00 pm	Brampton vs Montreal	Montreal 7–4	1 000 supporters
March 26	11:00 am	Minnesota vs Brampton	Brampton 7–2	500 supporters
March 26	3:00 pm	Toronto vs Montreal	Montreal 2–1	1000 supporters
March 27	1:00 pm	Championship Final game	Montreal 5–0	2 300 supporters

=== Championship game ===
March 27 Sunday: The final Game concluded with the powerful Montreal team defeating Toronto 5 -0. Montreal got off to a 2 – 0 lead in the first period, The first goal was scored by Noémie Marin on a backhand from her off wing at 14:47 minute as she converted a pass from Caroline Ouellette. The second goal was scored at 7:29 minute from a face off in the Toronto end as Dominique Thibault took the draw and Vanessa Davidson skated off the boards, picked up the puck and put a quick shot behind goaltender Sami Jo Small. The lone goal of the second period was scored at 10:36 by Sabrina Harbec on a nice outside drive cutting by Annie Guay. Sabrina Harbec pulled the goalie across the crease and put the puck in the top corner. The shots at the end of the second period were 34 to 17 in favour of Montreal Stars.

Montreal added two more goals in the third period to capture the 5–0 win Final game. At the 5:33 minute, Julie Chu feathered a pass to Caroline Ouellette. Ouellette making a perfect low shot to score. The final goal of the game was scored with 2:42 left as Sarah Vaillancourt picked up a pass from Caroline Ouellette and she hit the mark on a quick shot from about five feet out. Toronto goalie Sami Jo Small played well in defeat as Montreal controlled the game outshooting Toronto 51 to 26. Toronto did threaten offensively early in the game and could have turned the contest around but Montreal goalie, Kim St-Pierre, came up with exceptional saves to earn the shutout and ultimately crown Montreal Stars the Clarkson Cup Champions 2011.

Playoff Records	Games won	Games lost
Montreal	4	0
Toronto	2	2
Brampton	1	2
Minnesota	0	3

== Hockey Canada Selection Camp ==
Five Montreal Stars players invited: Caroline Ouellette, Kim St-Pierre, Sarah Vaillancourt, Emmanuelle Blais and Noemie Marin have been invited to Canada's National Team selection camp. The chosen players will represent women's national team at the 2011 World Women's Championships held in Switzerland, on April 16–25, 2011. The Hockey Canada selection camp, which takes place from April 2 to 5 at the Toronto MasterCard Centre.

== See also ==
- 2010–11 CWHL season
- Montreal Stars
- Canadian Women's Hockey League
- 2011 Clarkson Cup

== External news story ==
- Trying to get the message out by Stephanie Myles, The Gazette, March 24, 2011.
- Montreal beats Toronto to win the Clarkson Cup in official blog of Montreal Stars, March 27, 2011.
- Montreal hopes Clarkson Cup win promotes women's hockey league in Globe and Mail, March 27, 2011.
