= St. Lawrence Saints women's ice hockey =

- Current season
- University: St. Lawrence University
- Conference: ECAC
- Head coach: Chris Wells; 13th season, 221–161–57
- Arena: Appleton Arena; Canton, New York
- Colors: Scarlet and brown

NCAA tournament runner-up
- 2001

NCAA tournament Frozen Four
- 2001, 2004, 2005, 2006, 2007

NCAA tournament appearances
- 2001, 2004, 2005, 2006, 2007, 2008, 2009, 2012, 2017, 2024, 2025

Conference tournament champions
- 2012

The St. Lawrence Saints women's ice hockey program represents St. Lawrence University in Canton, New York. The Saints play at Appleton Arena and are part of the Eastern College Athletic Conference. In 2001, St. Lawrence participated in the inaugural NCAA Championship tournament. Their current head coach is St. Lawrence alumnus Chris Wells, who played for the 1992 men's championship ice hockey team.

== History ==
Beginning as a club team, the women's program has seen great success since entering Division I in 1997. Currently, the team has made five Frozen Four appearances in the eight years since the creation of a Women's NCAA Division I tournament. With the women's appearance in inaugural Frozen Four (2001), St. Lawrence became the first school to have both their men and women's programs in the NCAA Division I ice hockey tournament in the same year. The women's team also recorded the first ever win in the history of the NCAA Women's Frozen Four.

The first women's hockey game was played in 1974, as a club program. The women's team transitioned to a Division III program in 1979, and won three consecutive ECAC Division III tournaments in 1990, 1991, and 1992.

Following the 2007–08 season, Head Coach Paul Flanagan left St. Lawrence to a position with Syracuse University. Flanagan was the women's program's all-time winningest coach with a nine-season record of 230–83–24. Then Men's Associate Head Coach, Chris Wells was appointed to replace him and in his first season coached the team to a berth in the national championship tournament with a record of 24–11–3.

== Year by year ==
Won championship	Lost championship	Conference champions	League leader

Year	Coach	W	L	T	Conference	Conf. W	Conf. L	Conf. T	Finish	Conference Tournament	NCAA Tournament
2024–25	Chris Wells	22	12	5	ECAC	13	6	3	3rd ECAC	Won Quarterfinals vs. Yale (3–2, 4–3); Lost Semifinals vs. Colgate (2-4)	Lost Quarterfinals vs. Ohio State (1-6)
2023–24	Chris Wells	28	11	0	ECAC	18	4	0	3rd ECAC	Won Quarterfinals vs. Yale (4–1, 3–1); Lost Semifinals vs. Clarkson (1-3)	Lost Quarterfinals vs. Wisconsin (0-4)
2022–23	Chris Wells	17	19	3	ECAC	10	9	3	6th ECAC	Lost Quarterfinals vs. Quinnipiac (1–2, 3–2, 1–2 OT)	Did not qualify
2021–22	Chris Wells	15	15	7	ECAC	10	8	4	7th ECAC	Lost Quarterfinals vs. Yale (4–2, 2–4, 2–3)	Did not qualify
2020–21	Chris Wells	6	7	0	ECAC	5	5	0	2nd ECAC	Won Semifinals vs. Clarkson (4–3 OT); Lost Championship vs. Colgate (3–2)	Did not qualify
2019–20	Chris Wells	13	16	7	ECAC	8	10	4	8th ECAC	Lost Quarterfinals vs. Cornell (2–7, 2–3)	Did not qualify
2018–19	Chris Wells	14	15	7	ECAC	9	7	6	5th ECAC	Lost Quarterfinals vs. Princeton (1–4, 2–6)	Did not qualify
2017–18	Chris Wells	20	11	4	ECAC	14	6	2	4th ECAC	Won Quarterfinals vs. Quinnipic (3–1, 2–1); Lost Semifinals vs. Clarkson (2–4)	Did not qualify
2016–17	Chris Wells	26	6	4	ECAC	16	3	3	2nd ECAC	Won Quarterfinals vs. Yale (4–1, 4–0); Lost Semifinals vs. Cornell (3–1)	Lost Quarterfinals vs. Boston College (6–0)
2015–16	Chris Wells	17	15	6	ECAC	9	8	5	6th ECAC	Won Quarterfinals vs. Princeton (1–0, 3–4, 4–3 OT); Lost Semifinals vs. Quinnipiac (1–2)	Did not qualify
2014–15	Chris Wells	19	12	5	ECAC	13	5	4	5th ECAC	Lost Quarterfinals vs. Cornell (1–3, 2–3)	Did not qualify
2013–14	Chris Wells	13	19	3	ECAC	12	7	3	5th ECAC	Lost Quarterfinals vs. Quinnipiac (0–5, 1–2)	Did not qualify
2012–13	Chris Wells	19	14	5	ECAC	12	6	4	5th ECAC	Won Quarterfinals vs. Quinnipiac (1–0 OT, 2–3 3OT, 2–0); Lost Semifinals vs. Cornell (2–4)	Did not qualify
2011–12	Chris Wells	24	10	4	ECAC	14	6	2	5th ECAC	Won Quarterfinals vs. Dartmouth (4–3 OT, 2–0); Won Semifinals vs. Harvard (2–1 OT); Won Championship vs. Cornell (3–1)	Lost First Round vs. Boston College (3–6)
2010–11	Chris Wells	16	18	2	ECAC	11	11	0	7th ECAC	Lost Quarterfinals vs. Harvard (1–6, 3–8)	Did not qualify
2009–10	Chris Wells	16	14	7	ECAC	11	8	3	7th ECAC	Lost Quarterfinals vs. Clarkson (0–5, 2–1, 1–4)	Did not qualify
2008–09	Chris Wells	24	11	3	ECAC	16	5	1	2nd ECAC	Won Quarterfinals vs. Clarkson (4–3 OT, 2–1); Lost Semifinals vs. Dartmouth (2–5)	Lost First Round vs. Mercyhurst (1–3)
2007–08	Paul Flanagan	28	10	1	ECAC	18	3	1	2nd ECAC	Won Quarterfinals vs. Yale (2–1 OT, 3–2 OT); Won Semifinals vs. Dartmouth (3–1); Lost Championship vs. Harvard (2–3 OT)	Lost First Round vs. New Hampshire (2–3 OT)
2006–07	Paul Flanagan	29	8	3	ECAC	17	4	1	3rd ECAC	Won Quarterfinals vs. Clarkson (3–2, 3–1); Won Semifinals vs. Harvard (4–3); Lost Championship vs. Dartmouth (3–7)	Won First Round vs. New Hampshire (6–2); Lost Frozen Four vs. Wisconsin (0–4)
2005–06	Paul Flanagan	31	5	2	ECAC	16	2	2	1st ECAC	Won Quarterfinals vs. Yale (6–3, 6–2); Lost Semifinals vs. Harvard (1–3)	Won First Round vs. Minnesota-Duluth (1–0); Lost Frozen Four vs. Wisconsin (0–1)
2004–05	Paul Flanagan	28	8	5	ECAC	14	3	3	3rd ECAC	Won Quarterfinals vs. Brown (0–3, 3–0, 5–2); Lost Semifinals vs. Dartmouth (2–4)	Won First Round vs. Minnesota-Duluth (3–2 OT); Lost Frozen Four vs. Harvard (1–4)
2003–04	Paul Flanagan	28	10	1	ECAC	15	3	0	2nd ECAC	Won Quarterfinals vs. Colgate (5–1, 0–1, 7–1); Won Semifinals vs. Dartmouth (4–2); Lost Championship vs. Harvard (1–6)	Lost First Round vs. Harvard (1–2)
2002–03	Paul Flanagan	22	9	4	ECAC	10	4	2	4th ECAC	Lost Quarterfinals vs. Brown (4–1, 1–3, 1–3)	Did not qualify
2001–02	Paul Flanagan	22	10	4	ECAC	12	3	1	3rd ECAC	Won Quarterfinals vs. Cornell (4–3, 2–1 OT); Lost Semifinals vs. Brown (1–3)	Did not qualify
2000–01	Paul Flanagan	24	8	3	ECAC	18	4	2	3rd ECAC	Won Quarterfinals vs. New Hampshire (1–0); Lost Semifinals vs. Harvard (1–7)	Won First Round vs. Dartmouth (3–1); Lost Championship vs. Minnesota-Duluth (2–4)
1999–2000	Paul Flanagan	18	15	1	ECAC	11	12	1	7th ECAC	Lost Quarterfinals vs. Harvard (3–7)	Did not qualify
1998–99	Ron Waske	11	17	2	ECAC	8	16	2	10th ECAC	Did not qualify	Did not qualify
1997–98	Ron Waske	8	16	3							
1996–97	Pam Mahoney	7	19	0							
1995–96	Bernie McKinnon	6	15	2							
1994–95	Bernie McKinnon	9	10	0							
1993–94	Bernie McKinnon	10	9	1							
1992–93	Bernie McKinnon	10	8	2							
1991–92	Bernie McKinnon	8	9	1							
1990–91	Bernie McKinnon	5	11	3							
1989–90	Bernie McKinnon	4	13	1							
1988–89	Bernie McKinnon	7	16	0							
1987–88	Bernie McKinnon	7	11	0							
1986–87	Bernie McKinnon	14	9	0							
1985–86	Bernie McKinnon	9	10	1							
1984–85	Bernie McKinnon	12	7	0							
1983–84	Bernie McKinnon	14	5	0							
1982–83	Bernie McKinnon	12	7	1							
1981–82	Bernie McKinnon	12	5	1							
1980–81	Bernie McKinnon	8	10	1							
1979–80	Bernie McKinnon	12	4	0							
1978–79	Bernie McKinnon	11	5	0							

=== Coaches ===
Years	Coach	Record
1974	Bill Coakley	1–1–1
1974–77	Tom McDonald	
1978–1997	Bernie McKinnon	170–164–14
1996–97	Ron Waske/Pam Seaborn	17–19–0
1997–99	Ron Waske	19–34–5
1999–2008	Paul Flanagan	230–83–24
2008–present	Chris Wells	131–98–29

== Current roster ==
=== 2025-26 Saints ===
As of February 14, 2026.

No.	Nat.	Player	Class	Pos	Height	DoB	Hometown	Previous team
2	(Canada)	Rylan Haslam	Freshman	F	5' 6" (1.68 m)	2006-12-11	Oshawa, Ontario	Etobicoke Jr Dolphins
3	(Canada)	Ella Nancarrow	Freshman	D	5' 5" (1.65 m)		Ottawa, Ontario	Nepean Jr Wildcats
4	(United States)	Kennedy Wilson (C)	Senior	F	5' 5" (1.65 m)	2003-09-05	Hannawa Falls, New York	Northwood School
7	(United States)	Kiley Mastel (C)	Senior	F	5' 10" (1.78 m)	2002-04-28	Hamden, Connecticut	Philadelphia Jr Flyers
9	(Canada)	Mave O'Hagan	Sophomore	F	5' 7" (1.7 m)	2005-01-18	North Bay, Ontario	Cambridge Rivulettes
12	(Canada)	Cheyenne Degeer	Freshman	F	5' 3" (1.6 m)	2007-12-03	Tory Hill, Ontario	Central York Jr Panthers
13	(United States)	Riley Reeves	Junior	D	5' 8" (1.73 m)	2005-01-26	Woodbury, Minnesota	Bemidji State University
14	(Slovakia)	Lilien Benakova	Freshman	F	5' 5" (1.65 m)	2006-06-15	Banská Bystrica, Slovakia	Ontario Hockey Academy
17	(South Korea)	Taeyeon Kim	Freshman	D	5' 4" (1.63 m)	2006-03-04	Gwangjin-gu, Seoul, South Korea	Northwood School
18	(United States)	Kennedy Emerson	Junior	D	5' 5" (1.65 m)	2004-12-17	Potsdam, New York	Nepean Jr Wildcats
19	(Canada)	Hayden Summers	Freshman	D	5' 9" (1.75 m)	2007-04-08	Oneida Nation, Ontario	Stoney Creek Jr Sabres
20	(Canada)	Alexia Côté	Sophomore	D	5' 5" (1.65 m)		Saint-Rosaire, Québec	Limoilou (Cégep)
21	(United States)	Halle Mules	Sophomore	F	5' 2" (1.57 m)	2005-03-26	Abington, Massachusetts	Northwood School
22	(United States)	Alexa Davis	Graduate	D/F	5' 7" (1.7 m)	2003-03-12	Philadelphia, Pennsylvania	Cornell
24	(United States)	Hanna Olson	Freshman	F	5' 8" (1.73 m)	2007-02-24	Andover, Minnesota	Andover High School
28	(United States)	Meghan Crowley	Freshman	F	5' 10" (1.78 m)	2006-11-26	Baldwinsville, New York	Northwood School
31	(United States)	Sami Phelan	Sophomore	G	5' 3" (1.6 m)	2006-05-02	Laguna Beach, California	Anaheim Lady Ducks
33	(Denmark)	Emma-Sofie Nordström (A)	Senior	G	5' 10" (1.78 m)	2002-11-05	Herning, Denmark	Linköping HC
34	(Canada)	Kassidy Lawrence	Junior	G	5' 6" (1.68 m)		Cobourg, Ontario	Ottawa Jr Lady Senators
36	(Canada)	Brooke Mulvihill	Freshman	F	5' 4" (1.63 m)	2006-05-21	Ottawa, Ontario	Ottawa Jr Lady Senators
82	(United States)	Abby Hehl (A)	Junior	D	5' 4" (1.63 m)	2005-02-28	Burlington, New Jersey	New Jersey Titans
92	(Canada)	MacKenzie Clarke	Sophomore	D	5' 8" (1.73 m)	2005-09-07	Ottawa, Ontario	Ottawa Jr Lady Senators

== Notable players ==
- Isabelle Chartrand
- Sabrina Harbec
- Gina Kingsbury, (remains in the university's top-5 in career points (152) and goals (74)) and holds the school record with nine points in a game (4 goals, 5 assists)

== Olympians ==
- Isabelle Chartrand Canada: Ice hockey at the 2002 Winter Olympics – Women's tournament
- Gina Kingsbury, Canada: 2006 and 2010 Olympics
- Kristen Guerriero, Italy: 2026 Winter Olympics
- Justine Reyes, Italy: 2026 Winter Olympics.
- Former St. Lawrence University women's hockey assistant coach Jodi McKenna was an assistant for Team USA at the 2010 Olympics, which won the silver medal.
- When Gina Kingsbury won her first gold medal with Canada in 2006, she became the third St. Lawrence alumnus-athlete to win an Olympic gold medal. Her jersey number for Canada is 27, the same number that she had while skating for St. Lawrence. Fellow hockey player, Isabelle Chartrand was the second St. Lawrence alumnus who won an Olympic gold medal (doing so with Canada's women in 2002). The first St. Lawrence alum was Ed Rimkus, who won gold in 1932.

=== International ===
- Grace Harrison, Goaltender New Zealand: 2019 IIHF Women's World Championship Division II, Group B – Silver Medal

=== Scoring leaders ===
Player	Years played	Points
Sabrina Harbec	2004–08	217
Rebecca Russell	2001–05	178
Chelsea Grills	2003–08	167
Carson Duggan	2000–04	159
Gina Kingsbury	2000–04	152

== Awards and honors ==
- Rachel Barrie, 2003 Sarah Devens Award
- Brittony Chartier, 2010 Frozen Four Skills Competition participant
- Marianna Locke, 2009 Sarah Devens Award
- Britni Smith, 2010 Frozen Four Skills Competition participant
- Grace Harrison: Women's Hockey Commissioners Association Division I Goaltender of the Month for January 2019
- Sarah Thompson, 2025 Hockey Humanitarian Award

=== ECAC awards ===
- Meghan Maguire, Defense, 2002 ECAC North Second Team
- Britni Smith, Defense, 2009 Second Team All-ECAC
- Britni Smith, Pre-Season 2009–10 All-ECAC Team
- Rachel Barrie, Goalie, 2002 ECAC North First Team
- Rachel Barrie, 2002 ECAC-North Goalie of the Year
- Alison Domenico, Forward, 2009 Second Team All-ECAC
- Alison Domenico, 2009 ECAC Best Defensive Forward
- Gina Kingsbury, Forward, 2002 ECAC North First Team
- Gina Kingsbury, two-time ECAC All-Conference

==== ECAC All-Rookie Team ====
- Lucy Morgan, 2019–20 ECAC All-Rookie Team Selection

==== ECAC All-Tournament Team ====
- Sabrina Harbec, 2007 ECAC All-Tournament team

==== ECAC Monthly awards ====
- Taylor Lum, ECAC Adirondack Health Rookie of the Month (March 2021)

==== ECAC Weekly awards ====
- Jamie Goldsmith, ECAC Rookie of the Week (Week of October 12, 2009)
- Kelly Sabatine, ECAC Rookie of the Week (Week of October 19, 2009)
- Kayla Sullivan, ECAC Rookie of the Week (Week of October 26, 2009)
- Rachel Bjorgan, Adirondack Health Rookie of the Week (Awarded March 8, 2021)
- Kayla Vespa, ECAC Hockey Player of the Week (St. Lawrence) (awarded October 21, 2019)

=== All-America honors ===
- Isabelle Chartrand, Second Team All-America honors (2001)
- Gina Kingsbury, All-America honors (2004)
- Rebecca Russell, All-America honors (2005)
- Sabrina Harbec, First Team All-America selection (2006)
- Annie Guay, Second Team All-America selection (2006)
- Sabrina Harbec, All-America honors (2007, 2008)
- Annie Guay, All-America honors (2007, 2008)
- Brooke Webster, ACHA Women's CCM Hockey Division I Second Team All-America

=== Patty Kazmaier Award finalists ===
Year	Player	Position
2008	Sabrina Harbec	Forward
2007	Sabrina Harbec	Forward
2006	Sabrina Harbec Jessica Moffat	Forward Goalie 2005 Forward

In 2005, Harbec was a top three finalist for the Patty Kazmaier Memorial Award. She was the first St. Lawrence player to be a finalist for the award.

== Saints in professional hockey ==
= CWHL All-Star	= NWHL All-Star	= Clarkson Cup Champion	= Isobel Cup Champion	= Walter Cup Champion

Player	Position	Team(s)	League(s)	Years	Championships
Mae Batherson	Defense	Minnesota Frost	PWHL	2	2025 Walter Cup
Amanda Boulier	Defense	Connecticut Whale Minnesota Whitecaps Boston Pride Ottawa Charge Montreal Victoire	PHF PWHL		
Nadine Edney		Sydney Sirens; EHV Sabres Wien	AWIHL; EWHL	2	2020 Joan McKowen Memorial Trophy; 2021 Austrian women's league championship
Julia Gosling	Forward	Toronto Sceptres Seattle Torrent	PWHL	2	
Annie Guay	Defense	Montreal Stars	CWHL		2011 Clarkson Cup
Sabrina Harbec	Forward	Montreal Stars	CWHL		2009 Clarkson Cup
Grace Harrison	Goaltender	Botany Swarm	NZIHL	3	
Gina Kingsbury	Forward	Montreal Axion; Calgary Oval X-Treme	NWHL; WWHL		Gold Medal: 2007 Esso Women's Nationals; 2016 Clarkson Cup asst. coach
Kennedy Marchment	Forward	Connecticut Whale Montreal Victoire	PHF PWHL		
Hannah Miller	Forward	Shenzhen KRS Vanke Rays; Dream Gap Tour Toronto Sceptres Vancouver Goldeneyes	CWHL; PWHPA PWHL		
Kayla Nielsen		Sydney Sirens; EHV Sabres Wien	AWIHL; EWHL	2	2020 Joan McKowen Memorial Trophy; 2021 Austrian women's league championship
Anna Segedi	Forward	Vancouver Goldeneyes	PWHL	1	
Britni Smith	Defense	Toronto Furies	CWHL		2014 Clarkson Cup scored GWG
Kayla Vespa	Forward	New York Sirens	PWHL		
Brooke Webster	Forward	Vanke Rays; Markham Thunder	CWHL	2	

== See also ==
- List of college women's ice hockey coaches with 250 wins (Paul Flanagan ranks ninth on all-time list)
- St. Lawrence Saints men's ice hockey
