= Annie Guay =

Canadian ice hockey player

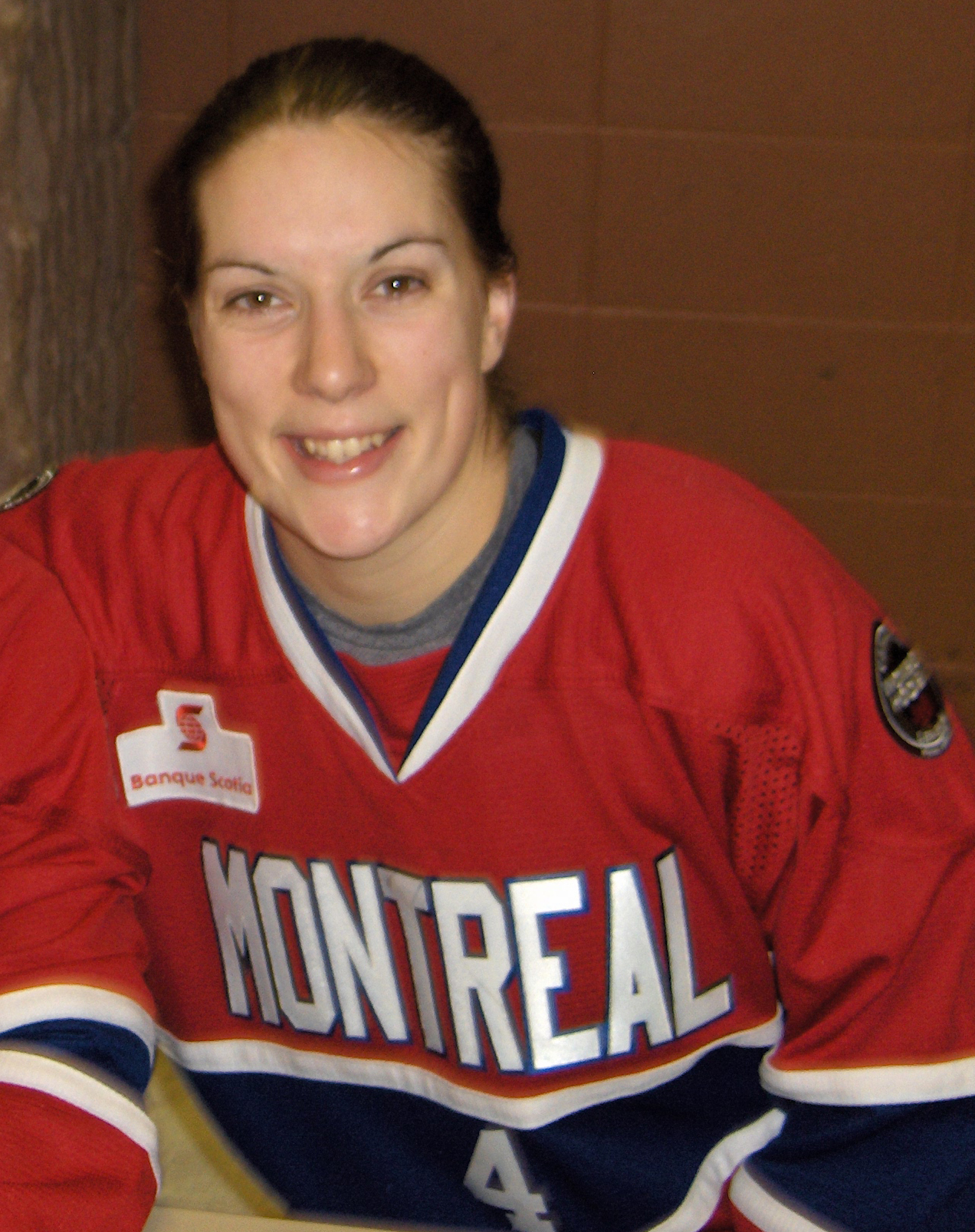
- Born: June 29, 1985 (age 41) Rouyn-Noranda, Quebec, Canada
- Height: 5 ft 8 in (173 cm)
- Weight: 174 lb (79 kg; 12 st 6 lb)
- Position: Defence
- Shot: Left
- Played for: Montreal Stars (CWHL); St. Lawrence Skating Saints (ECAC)
- National team: Canada
- Playing career: 2003–2011
Medal record
Women's ice hockey
Representing Canada
4 Nations Cup
Gold medal – first place	2010 Canada	Tournament
MLP Nations Cup
Gold medal – first place	2004 Germany	Tournament
Gold medal – first place	2005 Germany	Tournament
Gold medal – first place	2006 Germany	Tournament
Gold medal – first place	2007 Germany	Tournament
Gold medal – first place	2010 Germany	Tournament

Annie Guay (born June 29, 1985) is a Canadian ice hockey player. She is a member of the Canadian national women's hockey team and a member of Montreal Stars (CWHL). Her first tournament for the senior Canada women's national ice hockey team was at the 2010 Four Nations Cup where she won the gold medal. At the age of 25, she retired from the competitive hockey.

== Playing career ==
Born in Rouyn-Noranda, Guay made her amateur hockey in the region of Abitibi-Témiscamingue in Quebec. She was selected for the national camp Under-22 years and she played for the under-22 Canadian National Team (2003 to 2009). Also since 2008, she is a member of Montreal Stars in the Canadian Women's Hockey League (CWHL). In season 2010–11, She is 7th leading scorer and only Defencemen in the top 10 scoring leaders.

=== NCAA ===
Guay was an important key to the Saints' defensive success in the 2005–06 season. The St. Lawrence Saints held league opponents to an average of 1.10 goals per game. In addition, Guay contributed on with 21 points (seven goals, fourteen assists) in ECAC league games, which led all ECAC defenders. In her senior year at St. Lawrence (2007–08), Guay, along with teammate Sabrina Harbec capped their senior years by earning All-America honors for the third straight year.

=== Hockey Canada ===
The retirement of three defenders (Becky Kellar, Colleen Sostorics and Carla MacLeod) created room on defense for Canada's senior women's team. Guay was selected to Canada's team at the 2010 4 Nations Cup. Guay was not called by Hockey Canada for the selection camp for the 2011 World Women's Championships held in Switzerland, on April 16–25, 2011.

== Career stats ==
Annie Guay is the all-time leader in games played for Canada's Under 22 National women's team with 37 games played.

years	Games	Goals	Assists	Pts	Pen
2003 at 2007 and 2009–10	37	8	10	18	20

=== Hockey Canada ===
Event	GP	G	A	Pts
August 2003; Exhibition vs. US	3	0	0	0
2004 Air Canada Cup	4	1	2	3
August 2004; Exhibition vs. US	3	0	0	0
2005 Air Canada Cup	4	1	0	1
2005 U22 Selection Camp; Canada White squad	2	1	1	2
2006 Air Canada Cup	4	0	1	1
2006 U22 Selection Camp; Canada White squad	2	1	0	1
August 2006; Exhibition vs. US	3	0	0	0
2007 Air Canada Cup	5	1	3	4
2009 U22 Selection Camp; Canada White squad	2	0	1	1
2010 MLP Nations Cup	5	3	2	5
2010 Four Nations Cup	4	0	0	0

=== CWHL ===
Year	Team	GP	G	A	PTS	PIM
2008–09	Montreal Stars	n/a	n/a	n/a	n/a	n/a
2009–10	Montreal Stars	22	7	25	32	12
2010–11	Montreal Stars	26	13	18	31	16

=== NCAA ===
Season	Games played	Goals	Assists	Points
2004–05	39	2	5	7
2005–06	36	8	26	34
2006–07	36	11	22	33
2007–08	32	4	25	29

== Retirement from hockey ==
Annie Guay retired from competitive hockey in April 2011. She now lives in Abitibi. She appears at school hockey for L'École de hockey du Nord-Ouest (at Rouyn-Noranda), and she coaches the young girls.

== Awards and honours ==
- Second Team All-America selection (2006)
- 2006 First Team All-ECAC
- 2006 ECAC Tournament team
- 2006–07 ECAC Coaches Preseason All-League Selection
- 2006–07 ECAC Media Preseason All-League Selection
- 2007 European Air Canada Cup, Top Defenceman Award (awarded by the Directorate)
- All-America honors (2007)
- All-America honors (2008)
- 2008 First Team All-ECAC
- Winner of Clarkson Cup in 2008–09 with Montreal Stars
- First Team All-Stars 2009–10 in CWHL
- CWHL Top Defender 2009–10
