= 2008–09 CWHL season =

The 2008–09 CWHL season is the second season of the Canadian Women's Hockey League (CWHL). The Montreal Stars repeated as regular season champions, winning 25 of 30 games, and won CWHL Championship. Caroline Ouellette was voted the league's regular-season Most Valuable Player. Jayna Hefford won the Angela James Bowl with 69 points and was also voted the CWHL Top Forward. Becky Kellar was voted the CWHL Top Defender, Kim St-Pierre was voted the CWHL Top Goaltender, and Laura Hosier was voted the CWHL Outstanding Rookie.

== Regular season ==
- En route to winning this season's Angela James Bowl as the scoring champion, Jayna Hefford became the first player in CWHL history to record 100 career points (having finished second in the previous, inaugural CWHL season's scoring race) She recorded the milestone on January 17, 2009, in a win over the Montreal Stars.

== Final standings ==
Note: GP = Games played, W = Wins, L = Losses, OTL = Overtime Losses, SOL = Shootout Losses, GF = Goals for, GA = Goals against, Pts = Points.

CWHL Division
No.	Team	GP	W	L	OTL	SOL	Pts	GF	GA
1	Montreal Stars	30	25	4	0	1	51	135	66
2	Brampton Thunder	30	22	7	0	1	45	136	65
3	Mississauga Chiefs	30	19	9	1	1	40	101	69
4	Burlington Barracudas	30	11	16	1	2	25	82	99
5	Vaughan Flames	30	9	19	0	2	20	82	127
6	Ottawa Senators	30	4	26	0	0	8	57	167

== Playoffs ==
=== Brampton vs. Mississauga ===
- March 14: Brampton 3, Mississauga 2
- March 15: Mississauga 4, Brampton 1

=== Burlington vs. Montreal ===
- March 14: Montreal 6, Burlington 1
- March 15: Burlington 3, Montreal 1

Montreal Stars won the CWHL Championship

== Awards and honours ==
- Most Valuable Player: Caroline Ouellette, Montreal
- Angela James Bowl: Top Scorer Jayna Hefford, Brampton
- Outstanding Rookie: Laura Hosier, Brampton

=== CWHL Top Players ===
- Top Forward: Jayna Hefford, Brampton
- Top Defender: Becky Kellar, Burlington
- Top Goaltender: Kim St-Pierre, Montreal

=== CWHL All-Stars ===
First Team All-Stars

- Goaltender: Kim St-Pierre, Montreal
- Defender: Cheryl Pounder, Mississauga
- Defender: Becky Kellar, Burlington
- Forward: Jayna Hefford, Brampton
- Forward: Caroline Ouellette, Montreal
- Forward: Jennifer Botterill, Mississauga

Second Team All-Stars

- Goaltender: Sami Jo Small, Mississauga
- Defender: Bobbi Jo Slusar, Brampton
- Defender: Ashley Pendleton, Brampton
- Forward: Jana Harrigan, Burlington
- Forward: Lara Perks, Mississauga
- Forward: Sabrina Harbec, Montreal

=== CWHL All-Rookie Team ===
- Goaltender: Laura Hosier, Brampton
- Defender: Annie Guay, Montreal
- Defender: Shannon Moulson, Mississauga
- Forward: Noemie Marin, Montreal
- Forward: Brooke Beazer, Brampton
- Forward: Amanda Parkins, Burlington

=== Monthly Top Scorers ===
- October: Sabrina Harbec, Montreal (8+11=19 points, 6 games)
- November: Caroline Ouellette, Montreal (8+11=19 points, 6 games)
- December: Caroline Ouellette, Montreal (7+10=17 points, 6 games)
- January: Noemie Marin, Montreal (10+9=19 points, 9 games)
- February: Jennifer Botterill, Mississauga (10+7=17 points, 6 games)

== Clarkson Cup ==
Montreal Stars won the Clarkson Cup by defeating 3–1 the Minnesota Whitecaps (WWHL)

== See also ==
- Canadian Women's Hockey League
- Clarkson Cup
