= Kelly Sudia =

Canadian ice hockey player

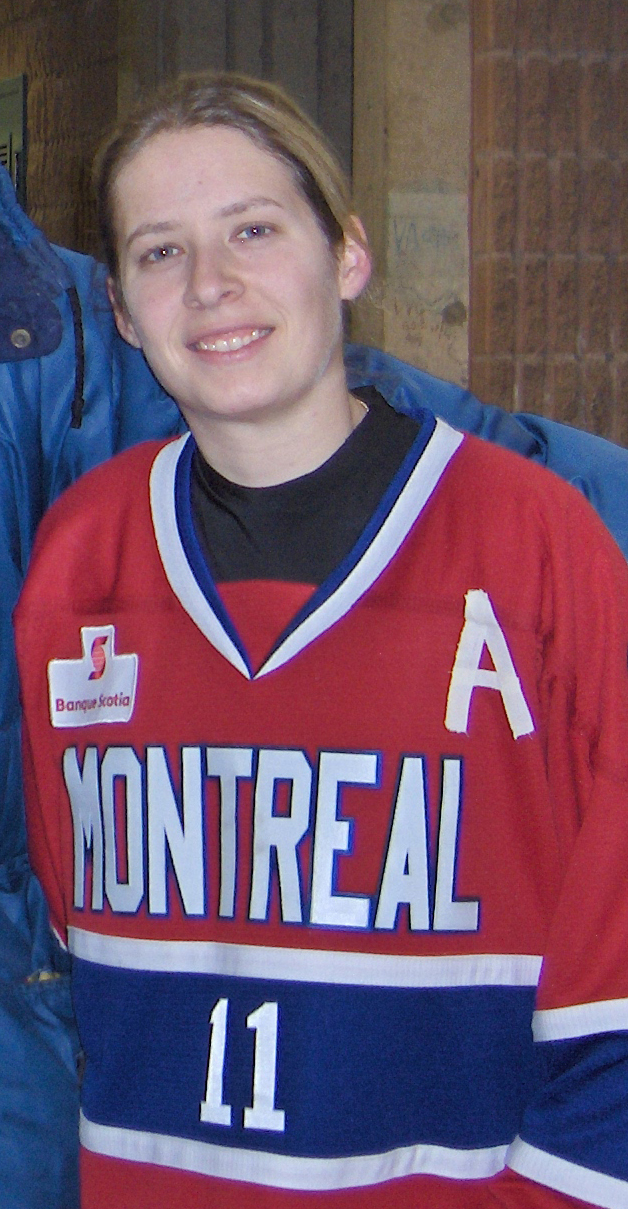
- Born: 3 July 1980 (age 46) Pointe-Claire, Quebec, Canada
- Height: 157 cm (5 ft 2 in)
- Weight: 59 kg (130 lb; 9 st 4 lb)
- Position: Centre/Defence
- Shot: Left
- Played for: Concordia Stingers; Montreal Axion; Montreal Stars
- Playing career: 2000–2012

Kelly Sudia (born 3 July 1980 in Pointe-Claire, Quebec) is a former professional ice hockey player from Canada. She played in five consecutive Canadian Women's Hockey League championships and won three Clarkson Cup championships. After retiring as a player in 2012, she has been the operations manager and technical coach of the Montreal Canadiennes.

== Early life ==
Sudia began playing hockey at age 8. She played on amateur teams of the Lakeshore Hockey Association in the West Island area of (Montreal), then joined the Islanders, the John Abbott College women's hockey team in the AA College Women's Hockey League.

== Career ==
=== Concordia Stingers ===
Sudia played five seasons (2000–2005) for the Concordia Stingers in the Canadian Interuniversity Sport (CIAU) Championship. Considered to be one of the top defensive players on the university circuit, Sudia helped the Stingers compete in the national women's college hockey tournaments in the 2000–01, 2001–02 and 2004–05 seasons. She was captain of the Stingers in 2004–05.

=== Montreal Axion ===
In 2005–06, Sudia joined the Montreal Axion in the National Women's Hockey League (NWHL). She excelled in defence and particularly in playing shorthanded. She helped the Axion win the league championship in 2005–06 and the following season the team advanced to the championship but lost to the Brampton Thunder. Due to financial difficulties, the NWHL ceased operations in 2007.

== Team Quebec ==
Sudia was chosen as a defenceman for the Quebec team at the 2006 Esso Canadian National Championship and helped the team win second place to Ontario, earning a silver medal.

=== Montreal Stars ===
In the formation of the Canadian Women's Hockey League (CWHL), Sudia joined the Montreal Stars. She was a member of the team starting in the 2007–08 season, and helped the Stars win three CWHL Championships (playing in the tournament in five consecutive years) and three Clarkson Cups. She became assistant captain of the Stars in 2009. A defensive player, she finished the 2010–11 season with a record of three goals and four assists. In the 2011–12 season, Sudia scored two goals and five assists for a total of seven points in 26 games. After winning the 2012 Clarkson Cup, Sudia retired from professional hockey.

== Coaching ==
Sudia's retirement from the Montreal Stars (along with Stephanie Denino) represented a loss of leadership for the team. Sudia returned as an assistant coach for the Stars in 2013 and assisted general manager Meg Hewings with the team's logistics and operations. For five years she has acted as the operations manager, video coach and technical coach of the Stars, which were renamed the Canadiennes in 2015.

Sudia graduated from Concordia University with a bachelor's degree in leisure sciences. She is an academic advisor at John Abbott College.

== Awards and honours ==
- 3-time Clarkson Cup champion (2009, 2011 and 2012)
- 5 consecutive championships in the CWHL
- Silver medalist at the 2006 Esso Women's National Championship in Sydney, Nova Scotia
- Distinction Award (2005) for her university career at the end of her last CIS season
- 2-time MVP of John Abbott Islanders and elected to the first all-star team in the Quebec College Women's AA Hockey League (1999–2000 season).
