= 2012–13 CWHL season =

The 2012–13 CWHL season (Canadian Women's Hockey League) was the league's sixth. The Boston Blades defeated the defending champions Montreal Stars at the finals in Markham, Ontario.

== Teams and statistics ==
Final standings:

Team	GP	W	L	OTL	PTS	PCT	GF	GA	PIM	Home	Away
Boston Blades	24	19	4	1	39	.813	72	39	252	10–3–0	9–1–1
Montreal Stars	24	18	5	1	37	.771	105	58	222	11–3–1	7–2–0
Brampton Thunder	24	10	12	2	22	.458	71	83	352	5–4–2	5–8–0
Toronto Furies	24	10	13	1	21	.438	60	72	266	4–4–1	6–9–0
Alberta	24	3	21	0	6	.125	30	86	294	2–10–0	1–11–0

Team Alberta was captained by Bobbi-Jo Slusar with alternates Meaghan Mikkelson, Jenna Cunningham and Erin Duggan. Boston was captained by Caitlin Cahow. Brampton was captained by Jayna Hefford with alternates Gillian Apps and Lori Dupuis. Montreal was captained by Lisa-Marie Breton, with alternates Caroline Ouellette, Noemie Marin and Catherine Ward. Toronto was captained by Tessa Bonhomme with alternates Mallory Deluce, Shannon Moulson and Britni Smith.

== Awards and honours ==
The 2013 CWHL Awards Gala was held on Mar. 21, 2013 in Markham, ON (during the Clarkson Cup weekend). That night, the league formally recognized the CWHL regular-season champions, the Angela James Bowl winner, the Most Valuable Player, the Goaltender of the Year, the Rookie of the Year, the Coach of the Year, the Defenceman of the Year, and the Humanitarian Award winner. The all-star teams (as voted by the five head coaches) and annual all-rookie team were announced before the start of the 2013–14 season.

- Most Valuable Player: Hilary Knight, Boston
- Angela James Bowl: Top Scorer Meghan Agosta, Montreal
- Outstanding Rookie: Ann-Sophie Bettez, Montreal
- Coach of the Year: Digit Murphy, Boston
- Humanitarian Award: Samantha Holmes-Domagala

=== CWHL Top Players ===
- Top Forward: Hilary Knight, Boston
- Top Defender: Catherine Ward, Montreal
- Top Goaltender: Genevieve Lacasse, Boston

=== CWHL All-Stars ===
First Team All-Stars

- Goaltender: Genevieve Lacasse, Boston
- Defender: Gigi Marvin, Boston
- Defender: Catherine Ward, Montreal
- Forward: Hilary Knight, Boston
- Forward: Meghan Agosta, Montréal
- Forward: Caroline Ouellette, Montreal

Second Team All-Stars

- Goaltender: Charline Labonte, Montreal
- Defender: Kacey Bellamy, Boston
- Defender: Tessa Bonhomme, Toronto
- Forward: Jayna Hefford, Brampton
- Forward: Rebecca Johnston, Toronto
- Forward: Meghan Duggan, Boston

=== CWHL All-Rookie Team ===
- Goaltender: Genevieve Lacasse, Boston
- Defender: Tara Watchorn, Alberta
- Defender: Anne Schleper, Boston
- Forward: Hilary Knight, Boston
- Forward: Ann-Sophie Bettez, Montreal
- Forward: Rebecca Johnston, Toronto

=== CWHL Monthly Top Scorer ===
- October: Vicki Bendus, Brampton
- November: Meghan Agosta, Montreal
- December: Meghan Agosta, Montreal
- January: Meghan Agosta, Montreal
- February: Jayna Hefford, Brampton
- March: Meghan Agosta, Montreal
