= 2004–05 St. Lawrence Saints women's ice hockey season =

2005 Frozen Four, Lost, Semifinals
- Conference: ECAC
- Home ice: Appleton Arena

Record
- Overall: 28-8-5

Coaches and captains
- Head coach: Paul Flanagan

The 2004–05 St. Lawrence Saints women's hockey team represented St. Lawrence University in the 2004–05 NCAA Division I women's hockey season. The Saints were coached by Paul Flanagan and play their home games at Appleton Arena. The Saints were a member of the Eastern College Athletic Conference and were unable to win the NCAA Women's Ice Hockey Championship

== Player stats ==
Player	Games played	Goals	Assists	Points
Rebecca Russell	41	32	38	70
Emilie Berlinguette	39	22	25	47
Chelsea Grills	32	20	23	43
Crystal Connors	41	12	26	38
Sabrina Harbec	37	16	20	36

== Frozen Four ==
National Quarterfinals; Home Sites; March 18-March 20
1	Minnesota	6
8	Providence	1
Higher seed hosts
5	Wisconsin	3
4	Dartmouth	4
3	Harvard	5***
6	Mercyhurst	4
Higher seed hosts
7	St Lawrence	3*
2	Minnesota-Duluth	2

National Semifinals; Durham, New Hampshire; March 25
1	Minnesota	7
4	Dartmouth	2
3	Harvard	4
7	St Lawrence	1

National Championship; Durham, New Hampshire; March 27
1	Minnesota	4
3	Harvard	3

* Overtime

*** 3rd Overtime

St Lawrence defeated Dartmouth 5–1 in the Consolation Game.

== Awards and honors ==
- Rebecca Russell, Senior Athlete of the Year
- Rebecca Russell, All-America selection

== See also ==
- St. Lawrence Saints women's ice hockey
