= 2007–08 St. Lawrence Saints women's ice hockey season =

- Conference: ECAC
- Home ice: Appleton Arena

Record
- Overall: 28-10-1

Coaches and captains
- Head coach: Paul Flanagan

The 2007–08 St. Lawrence Saints women's hockey team represented St. Lawrence University in the 2007–08 NCAA Division I women's hockey season. The Saints were coached by Paul Flanagan and played their home games at Appleton Arena. The Saints were a member of the Eastern College Athletic Conference and were unable to win the NCAA Women's Ice Hockey Championship.

== Player stats ==
Player	Games played	Goals	Assists	Points
Sabrina Harbec	37	18	34	52
Chelsea Grills	36	17	26	43
Tara Akstull	39	14	28	42
Carson Duggan	39	21	15	36

== Awards and honors ==
- Sabrina Harbec, All-America honors (2008)
- Annie Guay, All-America honors (2008)

== See also ==
- St. Lawrence Saints women's ice hockey
