= 2006–07 St. Lawrence Saints women's ice hockey season =

2007 Frozen Four, Lost, Semifinals
- Conference: ECAC
- Home ice: Appleton Arena

Record
- Overall: 29-8-3

Coaches and captains
- Head coach: Paul Flanagan

The 2006–07 St. Lawrence Saints women's hockey team represented St. Lawrence University in the 2006–07 NCAA Division I women's hockey season. The Saints were coached by Paul Flanagan and play their home games at Appleton Arena. The Saints were a member of the Eastern College Athletic Conference and were unable to win the NCAA Women's Ice Hockey Championship

== Player stats ==
Player	Games played	Goals	Assists	Points
Sabrina Harbec	38	26	44	70
Chelsea Grills	35	16	29	45
Carson Duggan	40	30	14	44

== Awards and honors ==
- Sabrina Harbec, All-America honors (2007)
- Sabrina Harbec, 2007 ECAC All-Tournament team
- Annie Guay, All-America honors (2007)

== NCAA Frozen Four ==
National Semifinals March 16
1	Wisconsin	4
Not seeded	St. Lawrence	2
Not seeded	Minnesota-Duluth	4
Not seeded	Boston College	3

National Championship March 18
1	Wisconsin	4
Not seeded	Minnesota-Duluth	1

== See also ==
- St. Lawrence Saints women's ice hockey
