= 2011 Clarkson Cup =

2011 ice hockey championship series

	1	Total
Montreal Stars	5	5
Toronto CWHL	0	0
- Location(s): Barrie, Ontario
- Dates: March 27, 2011
- Hall of Famers: Stars: Caroline Ouellette (2023); Kim St-Pierre (2020)

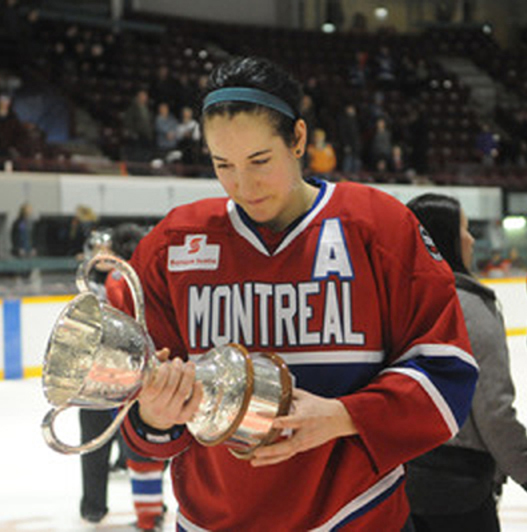
Caroline Ouellette with Clarkson Cup on March 27, 2011

The 2011 Clarkson Cup was contested at the Barrie Molson Centre in Barrie, Ontario, Canada. The four competing teams included three from the Canadian Women's Hockey League and one from the Western Women's Hockey League. All teams played each other in a round robin Thursday March 24 through Saturday March 26, with the top two teams meeting in the final Sunday March 27. In 2010 the tournament consisted of just two semi-finals and a final. A change to the format this year has made the tournament longer.

== Qualification ==
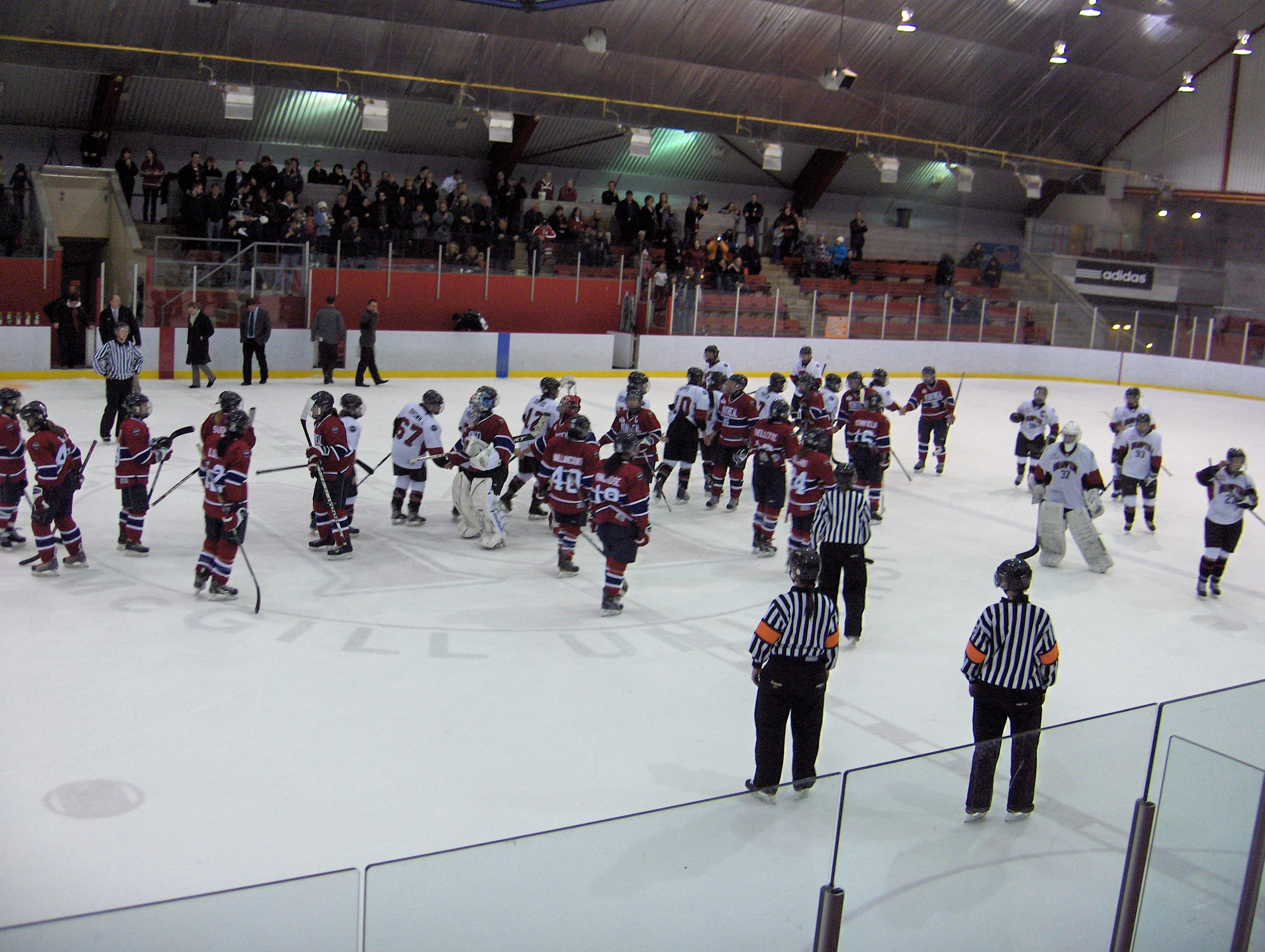
Brampton vs. Montreal

The top four teams from the CWHL competed in a tournament based on seedings. Seeds were determined by standings at end of regular season play. On March 11 and 12, the number 1 seed played against the number 2 seed while the number 3 seed challenged the number 4 seed. The victors competed on March 13 to determine the CWHL champion. The WWHL champion was the lone WWHL team to compete in the Clarkson Cup.

Date	Opponent	Score	Attendance
March 11, 2011	Toronto @ Boston	Toronto wins 4-2	280
March 11, 2011	Brampton @ Montreal	Montreal wins 2-1 (shootout)	100
March 12, 2011	Toronto @ Boston	Toronto wins 3-1	184
March 12, 2011	Brampton @ Montreal	Montreal wins 4-3	200

Boston Blades is eliminated and cannot participate in the Clarkson Cup Championship. Montreal Stars, Brampton Thunder and Toronto HC participated in the final tournament. The Minnesota Whitecaps of the WWHL complete the four teams.

== Rosters ==
=== Brampton Thunder ===
Goaltenders
Number	Country	Player	Hometown
37	(Canada)	Kira Hurley	Toronto, Ontario
35	(Canada)	Laura Hosier	Sharon, Ontario

Defensemen
Number	Country	Player	Hometown
43	(Canada)	Ashley Pendleton	Orton, Ontario
34	(Canada)	Delaney Collins, Assistant Captain	Pilot Mound, Manitoba
27	(Canada)	Kerri Palmer	Holland Landing, Ontario
24	(Canada)	Amber Bowman	Orton, Ontario
20	(Canada)	Allyson Fox	Toronto, Ontario
17	(Canada)	Melanie Rothon	Newmarket, Ontario
9	(United States)	Molly Engstrom	Grantsburg, Wisconsin

Forwards
Number	Country	Player	Hometown
93	(Canada)	Mandy Cole	Peterborough, Ontario
77	(Canada)	Brooke Beazer	Kingston, Ontario
71	(Canada)	Jennifer Kirk	Brampton, Ontario
67	(Canada)	Lindsay Brown	Hamilton, Ontario
66	(Canada)	Andrea Ironside	Collingwood, Ontario
16	(Canada)	Jayna Hefford, captain	Kingston, Ontario
12	(Canada)	Lori Dupuis	Cornwall, Ontario
10	(Canada)	Gillian Apps, Assistant Captain	Unionville, Ontario
7	(Canada)	Cherie Piper, Assistant Captain	Toronto, Ontario
4	(Canada)	Elysia Desmier	Ottawa, Ontario
2	(Canada)	Bree Polci	London, Ontario

==== Coaching staff ====
- General Manager: Maria Quinto and Jody Katz
- Head Coach: Peter Crosby
- Assistant Coach: Phil Bateman
- Assistant Coach: Kristi Alcorn

=== Montreal Stars ===
Goaltenders
Number	Country	Player	Hometown
35	(Canada)	Jenny Lavigne	Lac au Saumon, Quebec
33	(Canada)	Kim St-Pierre	Châteauguay, Quebec
27	(Canada)	Valerie Charbonneau	Sudbury, Ontario

Defensemen
Number	Country	Player	Hometown
44	(Canada)	Nathalie Dery, Assistant Captain	Cap Santé, Quebec
24	(Canada)	Stephanie Denino	Saint-Laurent, Quebec
19	(Canada)	Sharon Kelly	Riverview, New Brunswick
16	(Canada)	Gillian Merrifield	London, Ontario
8	(Canada)	Tawnya Danis	Pointe-Claire, Quebec
4	(Canada)	Annie Guay	Rouyn-Noranda, Quebec

Forwards
Number	Country	Player	Hometown
96	(Canada)	Sabrina Harbec	Saint-Hubert, Quebec
86	(Canada)	Dominique Thibault	L'Original, Ontario
47	(Canada)	Emmanuelle Blais	Montreal, Quebec
40	(Canada)	Sarah Vaillancourt	Sherbrooke, Quebec
26	(Canada)	Lisa-Marie Breton, Captain	Saint-Zacharie, Quebec
25	(Canada)	Vanessa Davidson	Kirkland, Quebec
21	(United States)	Julie Chu	Fairfield, Connecticut
18	(Canada)	Donna Ringrose	Campbell's Bay, Quebec
13	(Canada)	Caroline Ouellette, Assistant captain	Montreal, Quebec
12	(Canada)	Emilie Luck	Pointe-Claire, Quebec
11	(Canada)	Kelly Sudia, Assistant Captain	Pointe-Claire, Quebec
10	(Canada)	Noemie Marin	Acton Vale, Quebec

==== Coaching staff ====
- General Manager: Megh Hewings
- Head Coach:Patrick Rankine
- Assistant Coach: Philipe Trahan

=== Minnesota Whitecaps ===
Goaltenders
Number	Country	Player	Hometown
39	(United States)	Megan Van Beusekom	Loretto, Minnesota
30	(United States)	Kim Hanlon	Blaine, Minnesota
20	(United States)	Sanya Sandahl	Duluth, Minnesota

Defensemen
Number	Country	Player	Hometown
33	(United States)	Rachael Drazan	Orono, Minnesota
21	(United States)	Allie Sanchez	St. Paul, Minnesota
12	(United States)	Jenny Schnickel	Coon Rapids, Minnesota
7	(United States)	Briana Jentner	Akron, Ohio
5	(United States)	Winny Brodt, Captain	Roseville, Minnesota
2	(United States)	Chelsey Brodt	Roseville, Minnesota

Forwards
Number	Country	Player	Hometown
77	(United States)	Amy Stech	Duluth, Minnesota
29	(United States)	Christina Lee	Maple Plain, Minnesota
27	(United States)	Maggie Fisher	South St. Paul, Minnesota
25	(Russia)	Iya Gavrilova	Krasnoyarsk, Russia
22	(United States)	Megan McCarthy	Eden Prairie, Minnesota
19	(United States)	Erin Keys	St. Paul, Minnesota
16	(United States)	Jenny Potter	Edina, Minnesota
15	(United States)	Allie Thunstrom	Maplewood, Minnesota
11	(United States)	Krissy Wendell-Pohl	Brooklyn Park, Minnesota
10	(United States)	Brooke White-Lancette	Berkeley, California
9	(United States)	Gisele Marvin	Warroad, Minnesota
8	(United States)	Meaghan Pezon	Eden Prairie, Minnesota
6	(United States)	Kelli Blankenship	Miami, Florida
2	(United States)	Sammy Nixon	Blaine, Minnesota

==== Coaching staff ====
- Head Coach: Jack Brodt
- Assistant Coach: Dwayne Schmidgall
- Assistant Coach: Jim Minkoff

=== Toronto ===
Goaltenders
Number	Country	Player	Hometown
31	(Canada)	Allison Cubberley	Bracebridge, Ontario
30	(Canada)	Kendra Fisher	Kincardine, Ontario
1	(Canada)	Sami Jo Small	Winnipeg, Manitoba

Defensemen
Number	Country	Player	Hometown
25	(Canada)	Tessa Bonhomme	Sudbury, Ontario
19	(Canada)	Britni Smith	Port Perry, Ontario
18	(United States)	Alexandra Hoffmeyer	Detroit, Michigan
12	(Canada)	Martine Garland	Toronto, Ontario
5	(Canada)	Jessica Clermont	Port Elgin, Ontario
4	(Canada)	Michelle Bonello	Mississauga, Ontario
2	(Canada)	Haleigh Callison	Smithers, British Columbia

Forwards
Number	Country	Player	Hometown
96	(Canada)	Kelly Zamora	Oshawa, Ontario
67	(Canada)	Rebecca Davies	Toronto, Ontario
44	(Canada)	Kori Cheverie	Truro, Nova Scotia
27	(Canada)	Kristy Zamora	Oshawa, Ontario
17	(Canada)	Jennifer Botterill	Winnipeg, Manitoba
16	(Canada)	Frances McPhail	Vancouver, British Columbia
15	(Canada)	Angela Di Stasi	Toronto, Ontario
14	(Canada)	LaToya Clarke	Pickering, Ontario
11	(Canada)	Melanie Mills	Pusclinsh, Ontario
9	(Canada)	Jennifer Brine	Truro, Nova Scotia
6	(Canada)	Meagan Aarts	Wattford, Ontario
	(Canada)	Carly Haggard	Port Alberni, British Columbia

==== Coaching staff ====
- General Manager: Barb Fisher
- Head coach: Dan Lichterman
- Assistant coach: Joanne Eustace
- Assistant coach: Bartley Blair

== Tournament ==
In the first games, Toronto and Montreal earned victories over Brampton and Minnesota . In the second day, Sarah Vaillancourt scored 3 goals during the game to lead Montreal to a 7-4 victory over Brampton. In another match, Sami Jo Small celebrated her 35th birthday by stopping 40 shots to lead Toronto to a 6-0 win over Minnesota. The Championships tournament ran over the weekend. Saturday, Montreal scored a crucial victory 2-1 against Toronto. This win guaranteed Montreal a place in the Clarkson Cup final on Sunday against Toronto, who also recorded two victories in the tournament.

Date	Time	Teams	Final score	Attendance
March 24	12:00 noon	Toronto vs Brampton	Toronto 3-2	100
March 24	6:00 pm	Minnesota vs Montreal	Montreal 5-1	240
March 25	12:00 noon	Minnesota vs Toronto	Toronto 6-0	300
March 25	7:00 pm	Brampton vs Montreal	Montreal 7-4	1,000
March 26	11:00 am	Minnesota vs Brampton	Brampton 7-2	500
March 26	3:00 pm	Toronto vs Montreal	Montreal 2-1	1,000
March 27	1:00 pm	Championship Final game	Montreal 5-0	2,300

== Championship game ==
The final game on March 27 concluded with Montreal defeating Toronto 5–0. Montreal had a 2–0 lead in the first period, The first goal was scored by Noémie Marin on a backhand from her off wing at 14:47 as she converted a pass from Caroline Ouellette. The second goal was scored at 7:29 minute from a face off in the Toronto end as Dominique Thibault took the draw and Vanessa Davidson skated off the boards, picked up the puck and put a quick shot behind goaltender Sami Jo Small. The lone goal of the second period was scored at 10:36 by Sabrina Harbec on a nice outside drive cutting by Annie Guay. Sabrina Harbec pulled the goalie across the crease and put the puck in the top corner. The shots at the end of the second period were 34 to 17 in favour of the Montreal Stars.

Montreal added two more goals in the third period to win 5–0. At the 5:33 minute, Julie Chu feathered a pass to Caroline Ouellette, who made a perfect low shot to score. The final goal of the game was scored with 2:42 left as Sarah Vaillancourt picked up a pass from Caroline Ouellette and she hit the mark on a quick shot from about five feet out. Toronto goalie Sami Jo Small played well in defeat as Montreal controlled the game outshooting Toronto 51 to 26. Toronto did threaten offensively early in the game and could have turned the contest around but Montreal goalie, Kim St-Pierre, came up with exceptional saves to earn the shutout and ultimately crown Montreal Stars the Clarkson Cup Champions 2011.

- The Three Stars of the Game: First Star - Dominique Thibault, Montreal. Second Star - Vanessa Davidson, Montreal. Third Start - Jennifer Botterill, Toronto.

Playoff records	Games won	Games lost
Montreal	4	0
Toronto	2	2
Brampton	1	2
Minnesota	0	3

== Awards and honours ==
Award	Winner
Top goaltender in the tournament	
Player of the Game, Winning team, Clarkson Cup Final	Dominique Thibault
Player of the Game, Losing team, Clarkson Cup Final	Jennifer Botterill
Tournament Most Valuable Player	Sarah Vaillancourt
Top forward in the tournament	
Top defender in the tournament	

== See also ==
- Clarkson Cup
- 2010 Clarkson Cup
