= 2009 Clarkson Cup =

2009 ice hockey championship series

	1	Total
Montreal Stars	3	3
Minnesota Whitecaps	1	1
- Location(s): Kingston, Ontario
- Dates: March 21, 2009
- Hall of Famers: Stars: Caroline Ouellette (2023); Kim St-Pierre (2020); Whitecaps: Angela Ruggiero (2015)

The 2009 Clarkson Cup was contested at the K-Rock Centre in Kingston, Ontario. The Minnesota Whitecaps competed versus the Montreal Stars in the championship game. It was the first time that the Clarkson Cup was contested. At the time of the NHL lockout, Adrienne Clarkson suggested that women should play for the Stanley Cup.

== Championship game ==
Montreal beat the Minnesota Whitecaps by a 3-1 tally at the K-Rock Centre. The Stars goal scorers included Shauna Denis, Sabrina Harbec, and Caroline Ouellette. Three-time American Olympian Angela Ruggiero logged the lone tally for the defeated Whitecaps. Harbec scored the game-winning goal against Minnesota goalie Sanya Sandahl. Ouellette's goal was assisted by Marie-Philip Poulin.

== Olympians in the Clarkson Cup ==
- The following players also played for their respective countries in ice hockey at the 2010 Winter Olympics.

Player	Team	Nationality
Julie Chu	Minnesota Whitecaps	United States
Caroline Ouellette	Montreal Stars	Canada
Jenny Potter	Minnesota Whitecaps	United States
Kim St. Pierre	Montreal Stars	Canada

== See also ==
- Clarkson Cup
- Minnesota Whitecaps
