= 2005–06 St. Lawrence Saints women's ice hockey season =

St. Lawrence University

2006 Frozen Four, Lost, Semifinals
- Conference: ECAC
- Home ice: Appleton Arena

Record
- Overall: 31-5-2

Coaches and captains
- Head coach: Paul Flanagan

The 2005–06 St. Lawrence Saints women's hockey team represented St. Lawrence University in the 2005–06 NCAA Division I women's hockey season. The Saints were coached by Paul Flanagan and play their home games at Appleton Arena. The Saints were a member of the Eastern College Athletic Conference and were unable to win the NCAA Women's Ice Hockey Championship.

== Player stats ==
Player	Games played	Goals	Assists	Points
Sabrina Harbec	36	25	36	61
Carson Duggan	36	28	14	42
Emile Berlinguette	37	18	18	36
Annie Guay	36	8	26	34

== Awards and honors ==
- Sabrina Harbec, First Team All-America selection (2006)
- Annie Guay, Second Team All-America selection (2006)
- In 2006, Harbec was a top three finalist for the Patty Kazmaier Memorial Award. She was the first St. Lawrence player to be a finalist for the award.

== NCAA Frozen Four ==
National Semifinals March 24
1	New Hampshire	4
4	Minnesota	5
2	Wisconsin	2
3	St. Lawrence	1

National Championship March 26
4	Minnesota	0
2	Wisconsin	3

== See also ==
- St. Lawrence Saints women's ice hockey
