= Sarah Vaillancourt =

Canadian women's ice hockey player (born 1985)

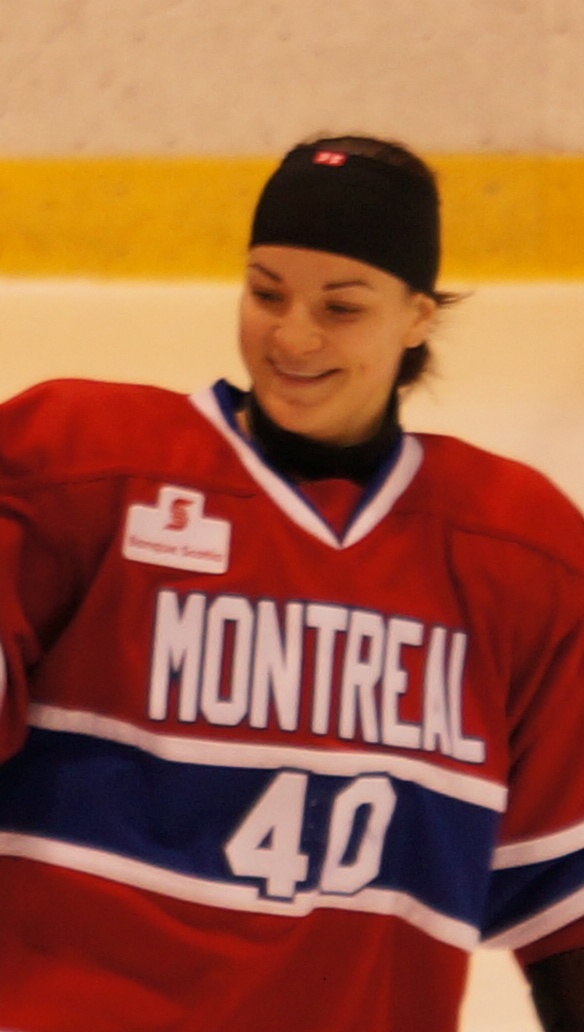
- Born: May 8, 1985 (age 41) Sherbrooke, Quebec, Canada
- Height: 5 ft 6 in (168 cm)
- Weight: 139 lb (63 kg; 9 st 13 lb)
- Position: Forward
- Shot: Right
- ECAC CWHL team: Harvard Crimson (2004-2009); Montreal Stars (2010-2013)
- National team: Canada
- Playing career: 2003–2013
Medal record
Representing Canada
Women's ice hockey
Olympic Games
| Gold medal – first place | 2006 Turin | Tournament |
| Gold medal – first place | 2010 Vancouver | Tournament |
IIHF World Women's Championships
| Gold medal – first place | 2007 Canada | Tournament |
| Silver medal – second place | 2005 Sweden | Tournament |
| Silver medal – second place | 2008 China | Tournament |
| Silver medal – second place | 2009 Finland | Tournament |
| Silver medal – second place | 2011 Switzerland | Tournament |
| Silver medal – second place | 2013 Canada | Tournament |
Women's 4 Nations Cup
| Gold medal – first place | 2010 Canada | Tournament |
MLP Nations Cup
| Gold medal – first place | 2005 Germany | Tournament |
| Gold medal – first place | 2007 Germany | Tournament |

Sarah Marie Vaillancourt (born May 8, 1985) is a Canadian ice hockey player who is a member of the Canada women's national team and a member of Montreal Stars (CWHL).

She is a two-time Olympic gold medalist, a World Championships gold medalist, a four-time World Championships silver medalist and a Clarkson Cup Champion (2010–11). From 2003 to 2009 Vaillancourt played 88 international games for Team Canada and scored 36 goals adding 39 assists. She won 2 Olympic gold medals for Canada, in 2006 and 2010. While playing for Harvard University she was named the Ivy League and ECAC Hockey Player of the Year. She led Harvard in scoring, and was ranked fourth overall in the NCAA in 2007–08. In 2008, she won the coveted Patty Kazmaier Award.

Vaillancourt started skating at the age of two years and a half and playing hockey at five years. She made the national team when she was 18 and one of her favourite hockey moments is winning gold on home soil at the Vancouver 2010 Olympic Games. She studied psychology at Harvard University and works as a skills coach. Vaillancourt is openly lesbian.

== Playing career ==
Vaillancourt was the captain of Canada's under-22 team at the 2007 Air Canada Cup. In 2003, she was the captain of Team Québec at the Canada Winter Games that won the silver medal. One of her teammates was future Olympian Catherine Ward. She graduated from high school as a tri-varsity captain and athlete from Pomfret School in Pomfret, Connecticut, as a member of the class of 2004.

=== Harvard Crimson ===
She was a star for the Harvard Crimson women's ice hockey program and won the Patty Kazmaier Award in 2008. Her freshman year was in 2004–05, and she finished fifth in the nation, and first among freshmen, in scoring with 2.31 points per game.

=== Hockey Canada ===
In 2005, she made the Canadian national women's hockey team, where she would go on to play at the 2005 Women's World Ice Hockey Championships in Sweden. In her first game ever, she led Canada with 6 points in a 13–0 win over the Kazakhstani national women's ice hockey team. This tied a record for most points in a game on the Canadian national team. She would finish the tournament with 8 points. On February 20, 2006, Vaillancourt, as the second youngest member of the team, won a team gold medal in Turin with the Canadian women's hockey team beating Sweden in the final game and outscoring their opponents 46 to 2.

=== Montreal Stars ===
At 2010–11 season, Vaillancourt joined the Montreal Stars midway through the season and instantly become a fan favourite, managing to crack the league's top-10 leading scorers, with an impressive 28 points (11 goals and 17 assists) in only 15 games. In the championship game of the 2011 Clarkson Cup, Vaillancourt scored a goal in the third period. By winning the 2011 Clarkson Cup, Vaillancourt became an unofficial member of the Triple Gold Club (the accomplishment by women is not yet officially recognized by the IIHF), as she became one of only four women to win the Clarkson Cup, a gold medal in the Winter Olympics, and a gold medal at the IIHF World Women's Championships. The other women include Caroline Ouellette, Jenny Potter and Kim St-Pierre. Surgery in the left hip held her outside the action this 2011–12 season.

== Personal life ==
Vaillancourt is openly lesbian.

== Career stats ==
=== Hockey Canada ===
| Event | Games played | Goals | Assists | Points | PIM |
| 2005 Women's World Championships | 5 | 3 | 5 | 8 | 2 |
| 2006 Olympics | 5 | 2 | 4 | 6 | 2 |
| 2007 Women's World Championships | 5 | 2 | 4 | 6 | 4 |
| 2008 Women's World Championships | 5 | 4 | 2 | 6 | 8 |
| 2009 Women's World Championships | 5 | 3 | 4 | 7 | 8 |
| 2010 Olympics | 5 | 3 | 5 | 8 | 6 |

== Awards and honours ==
- 2004-05 All USCHO.com Rookie Team
- Top 10 Finalist for 2007 Patty Kazmaier Award
- First Team All-Ivy League, 2007–08, Harvard (junior), unanimous selection
- Ivy League Player of the Year 2007–08, Harvard (junior), unanimous selection
- 2009 First Team All-Ivy League
- 2009 First Team All-ECAC
- 2009 ECAC Player of the Year
- 2011 Clarkson Cup Tournament Most Valuable Player

Awards and achievements
| Preceded by Julie Chu | Patty Kazmaier Award; 2007–08 | Succeeded by Jessie Vetter |
