= Angela James Bowl =

Women's ice hockey trophy

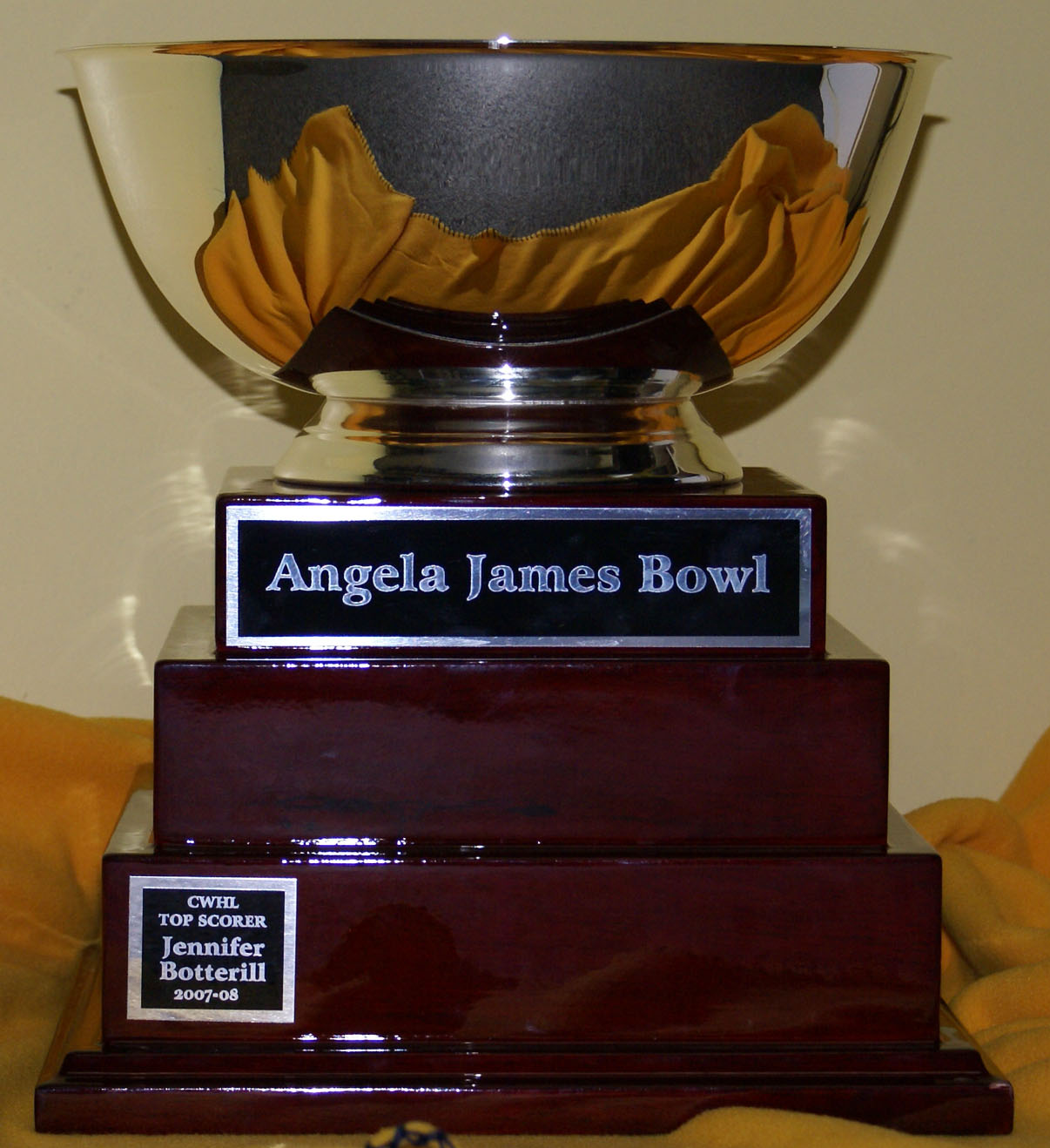
- Sport: Ice hockey

History
- First award: 2007–08
- Final award: 2018–19
- Most recent: Marie-Philip Poulin

The Angela James Bowl was a women's ice hockey trophy introduced in 2007-08 to recognize the top points scorer in the newly formed Canadian Women's Hockey League (CWHL). The trophy was donated in order to help preserve the statistical history of the new league and to help tell the story of women's ice hockey at the club level. The trophy was named in honour of Angela James, a former women's hockey standout who played in the old Central Ontario Women’s Hockey League and National Women's Hockey League. On March 22, 2008, Ms. James was on hand at the first CWHL Final to present the Angela James Bowl to CWHL's first scoring champion, Jennifer Botterill.

== Angela James ==
Angela James was a long-time member of the North York/Beatrice Aeros. She also played for the Hamilton Golden Hawks and Newtonbrook Panthers. She was a three-time scoring champion in the Central Ontario Women’s Hockey League and the first-ever goal-scoring champion in the National Women's Hockey League. At the international level, she won four-straight gold medals at the IIHF Women’s World Championships, leading Canada with 34 points after those first four IIHF tournaments. In 2008, she was one of the first women players inducted into the IIHF Hockey Hall of Fame. In 2010, she was one of the first women players inducted into the Hockey Hall of Fame.

== Winners ==
Jennifer Botterill was the inaugural 2007–08 scoring champion, overtaking runner-up Jayna Hefford in the final weekend of the regular season. Botterill scored 61 points, three more than Hefford who had led the scoring race for much of the season. Hefford then won the 2008–09 scoring title, setting a league record with 69 points after a 10-point lead on runner-up Caroline Ouellette, who had led the race for much of the season. In 2009–10, Sabrina Harbec won the title with an 11-point lead over runner-up Lindsay Vine.

In 2010–11, Caroline Ouellette won the trophy, scoring 68 points and had a 23-point margin over runner-up Jayna Hefford. In 2011–12, teammate Meghan Agosta became the first rookie to win the scoring title with a new record of 80 points and winning the race by 14 points over Ouellette. Agosta was the third different Montreal Stars player to win the title in three successive seasons.

In 2012–13, Meghan Agosta became the first two-time winner of the Angela James Bowl, winning her second-straight CWHL scoring title by a 13-point margin over rookie teammate Ann-Sophie Bettez. One year later, Bettez won the title, winning by a five-point margin over teammate Sarah Vaillancourt.

In 2016–17, both Jess Jones and Marie-Philip Poulin finished even with 37 points, marking the first tie in the Angela James Bowl scoring race. Ann-Sophie Bettez finished in third with 36 points, making it the closest race in the history of the league. In 2017–18, Kelli Stack became the first American to win the trophy, finishing the season with 49 points, eight points ahead of Bettez. In 2018–19, Marie-Philip Poulin became the first three-time winner.

Season	Winner	Team	GP	Pts	Pts/GP	Win #
2007–08	Jennifer Botterill	Mississauga Chiefs	26	61	2.35	1
2008–09	Jayna Hefford	Brampton Canadette-Thunder	28	69	2.46	1
2009–10	Sabrina Harbec	Stars de Montréal	29	55	1.90	1
2010–11	Caroline Ouellette	Stars de Montréal	26	68	2.62	1
2011–12	Meghan Agosta	Stars de Montréal	27	80	2.96	1
2012–13	Meghan Agosta	Stars de Montréal	23	46	2.00	2
2013–14	Ann-Sophie Bettez	Stars de Montréal	23	40	1.74	1
2014–15	Rebecca Johnston	Calgary Inferno	24	37	1.54	1
2015–16	Marie-Philip Poulin	Les Canadiennes	22	46	2.09	1
2016–17	Jess Jones	Brampton Thunder	24	37	1.54	1
2016–17	Marie-Philip Poulin	Les Canadiennes	23	37	1.61	2
2017–18	Kelli Stack	Kunlun Red Star WIH	28	49	1.75	1
2018–19	Marie-Philip Poulin	Les Canadiennes	26	50	1.92	3

== The Trophy ==
Incidentally, the Angela James Bowl is the oldest trophy associated with the Canadian Women's Hockey League, initiated in the league's inaugural 2007–08 season. The trophy is 28.8 centimeters tall. Each season's winner is recognized on a small black plaque that reads "CWHL Top Scorer" with the player's name and season.

A small personal trophy has also been created for each winner. The player trophy reads "Angela James Bowl" with the winner's name and winning season.
