= Noémie Marin =

Canadian ice hockey and softball player

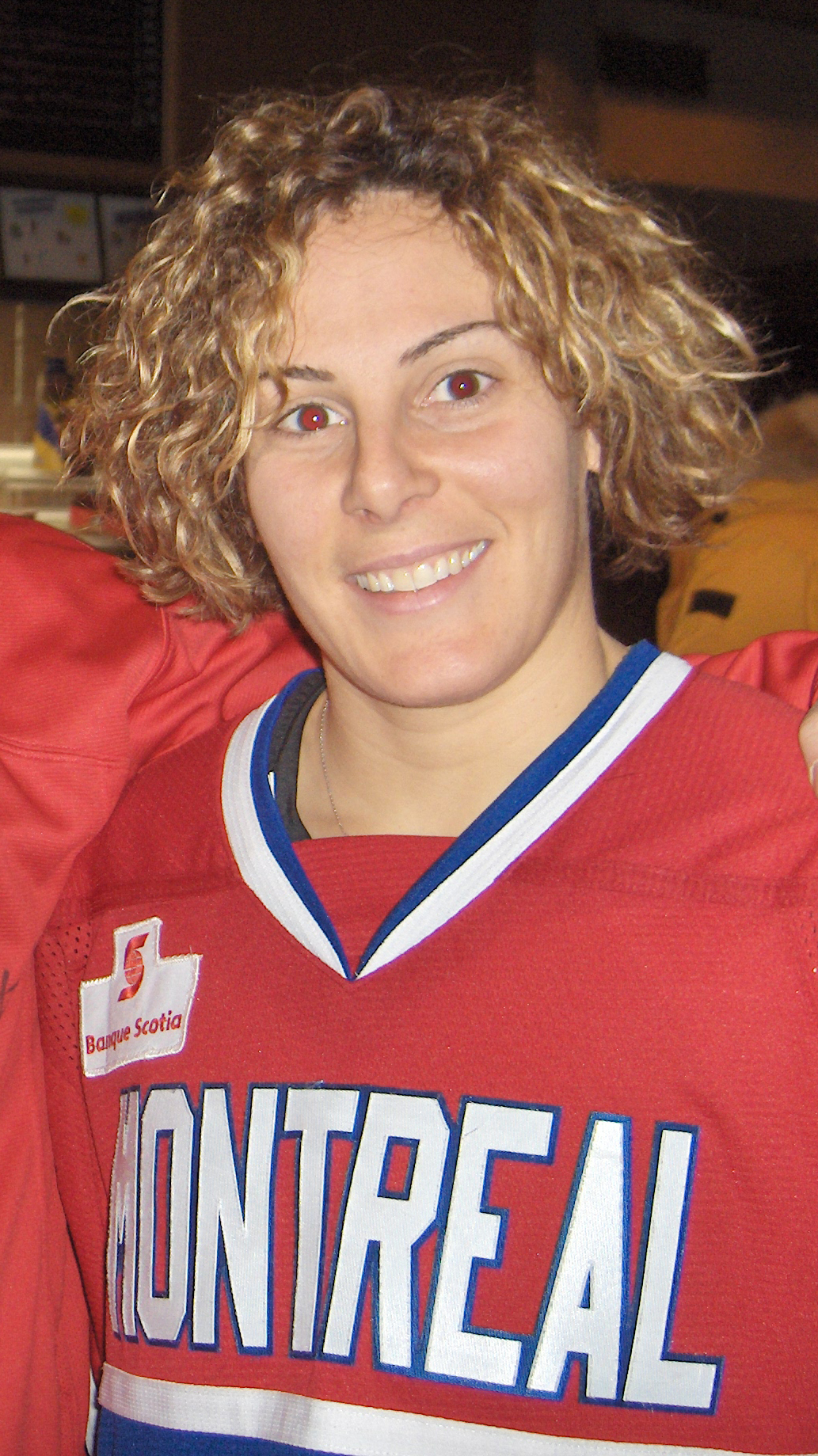
- Born: April 5, 1984 (age 42) Acton Vale, Quebec, Canada
- Height: 5 ft 6 in (168 cm)
- Weight: 145 lb (66 kg; 10 st 5 lb)
- Position: Forward
- Shoots: Left
- Played for: Canadiennes de Montreal; Montréal Wingstar; Minnesota Duluth Bulldogs
- National team: Canada

Noémie Marin
Medal record

Representing Canada

MLP Nations Cup
Gold medal – first place	2005 Germany	2005 Tournament
Gold medal – first place	2006 Germany	2006 Tournament

Noémie Marin (born April 5, 1984 in Acton Vale, Quebec) is a former two-sport athlete that played ice hockey and softball. She was a four-time Clarkson Cup winner and she retired as the CWHL's all-time leading goalscorer.

== Softball ==
In softball, Marin was the only player from Quebec to qualify for the 2008 Olympic softball roster. She played in three Canadian softball championships with the Québec Rebelles. In 2001 and 2002, she won the Canadian championships MVP award. Marin was part of the silver medal-winning squad at the 2007 Pan-American games in Rio de Janeiro. At the 2008 Beijing Olympics, Marin was part of the team that finished in fourth place. She was honoured with the Claudette Bergeron Trophy for Female Athlete of the Year in 2000 and 2001.

== Playing Hockey career ==
=== NCAA ===
Noémie Marin played hockey at the University of Minnesota Duluth on a scholarship, leading the team in points in 2006–2007. She received WCHA All-Rookie honours, was named to the inaugural group of WCHA Scholar-Athletes, and was twice named a top-10 finalist for the Patty Kazmaier Memorial Award. Marin set the team record for fastest two goals and shorthanded goals (0:27).

=== CWHL ===
Marin made her debut in 2008–09 with the Montreal Stars. Midway through the year, she set a CWHL single-game record by scoring 10 points (five goals and five assists) in a 12–3 win over the Ottawa Senators (January 3, 2009). She finished the year with 49 points (fourth overall in the Angela James Bowl scoring race) and was named to the CWHL All-Rookie Team. In 2009–2010, she scored 25 goals and was named a CWHL Second Team All-Star. In 2010–11 season, she finish 4th leading scorers, despite having been out of action with an injury for several weeks( missing 10 games due to an injury). In the championship game of the 2011 Clarkson Cup, Marin scored a goal.

Against the Brampton Thunder on December 13, 2015, Marin scored the 200th point in her CWHL career. Of note, Marin recorded an assist on a first period goal for Montreal scored by Karell Emard.

=== Hockey Canada ===
She is a former member of the Canadian U22 hockey team. In March 2011, she was invited to the Canadian national women's ice hockey team selection camp to determine the final roster for the 2011 IIHF Women's World Championships, from April 2 to 5 2011 at the Toronto MasterCard Centre

== Coaching career ==
Noemie Marin was named head coach of Canada's National Women's Development Team for the 2016–17 season. Currently, she serves as the women's hockey head coach at John Abbott College. In addition, she served as an assistant coach with the Canadian National Women's Under-18 Team that competed at the 2015 IIHF U18 Women's World Championship and with Team Quebec at the 2015 National Women's Under-18 Championship.

== Career stats ==
=== CWHL ===
Year	Team	Games Played	Goals	Assists	Points	+/-	PIM	PPG	SHG	GWG
2008–09	Montreal Stars	26	23	26	49					
2009–10	Montreal Stars	28	25	18	43		6			
2010–11	Montreal Stars	20	22	15	37	+27	10	6	2	7
2011–12	Montreal Stars									
2012–13	Montreal Stars									
2013–14	Montreal Stars	7	1	3	4	−2	2	0	0	0
2014–15	Montreal Stars	18	13	5	18	−1	2	7	0	1

=== Hockey Canada ===
Event	Games	Goals	Assists	Points	PIM
2004 U22 Exhibition vs. US	3	0	1	1	2
2005 MLP Cup	4	4	1	5	2
2005 Under-22 Development Camp	2	1	0	1	0
2006 MLP Cup	4	3	4	7	8
2007 National Evaluation Camp	2	0	0	0	2

== Awards and honours ==
=== Softball ===
- 2007 Pan American Games, silver
- Played in three Canadian championships with the Quebec Rebelles
- Canadian championships MVP, 2001 and 2002
- Claudette Bergeron Trophy for Female Athlete of the Year, 2000 and 2001

=== Ice hockey ===
- 2004 WCHA All-Rookie honours
- 2004–05 second team All-WCHA
- 2005–06 WCHA All-Academic Team
- 2005–06 second team All-WCHA
- Frozen Four Skills Challenge, Winner, 2007 Fastest Skater
- Frozen Four Skills Challenge, Winner, 2007 Hardest Shot (76.7 mph)
- Top-10 finalist for 2006 Patty Kazmaier Award
- Top-10 finalist for 2007 Patty Kazmaier Award
- USCHO.com Offensive Player of the Week (Week of January 12, 2004)
- USCHO.com Offensive Player of the Week (Week of November 29, 2005
- CWHL Player of the Month Award (March 2015)
