= Dominique Thibault =

Canadian ice hockey player

- Born: August 26, 1988 (age 37) L'Original, Ontario, Canada
- Height: 5 ft 11 in (180 cm)
- Position: Forward
- Shoots: Left
- Hockey East ECAC CWHL team: Connecticut Huskies; Clarkson Golden Knights; Montreal Stars

Dominique Thibault (born August 26, 1988) is an ice hockey player for the Montreal Stars and a former reality tv contestant.

== Playing career ==
=== NCAA ===
Thibault spent the first three years of her NCAA career with the Connecticut Huskies women's ice hockey program. In 2009-10, she played her senior season with the Clarkson Golden Knights women's ice hockey program. As part of her only season with the Golden Knights, she helped Clarkson reach the ECAC Championship Tournament for the second time in the program’s history and made its first ever NCAA Tournament appearance in 2010. In addition, Thibault was the Golden Knights leading scorer. She was part of the ECAC All-Star team that played the US National women's ice hockey team in fall 2010.

=== Montreal Stars ===
Thibault was part of the Montreal Stars 2011 Clarkson Cup championship team. In the championship game, she was named the First Star of the Game. She would also be part of the 2012 Clarkson Cup title team.

== Career stats ==
=== NCAA ===
Year	Team	Games Played	Goals	Assists	Points	+/-	PIM
2006-07	Connecticut	33	14	11	25	+6	32
2007-08	Connecticut	33	24	25	49	+29	18
2008-09	Connecticut	33	24	14	38	+18	18
2009-10	Clarkson	39	21	19	40	+6	28

=== CWHL ===
Year	Team	Games Played	Goals	Assists	Points	+/-	PIM
2010-11	Montreal						

=== Hockey Canada ===
Year	Event	Team	Games Played	Goals	Assists	Points	+/-	PIM
2007	National Under 22 vs. USA	3	1	0	1	0	0	

== Awards and honours ==
- 2007 Hockey East All-Rookie team
- 2008 Second Team RBK All-American
- 2007-08 Hockey East First Team All-Star
- 2008 Hockey East Player of the Year
- 2008 New England Hockey Writers Division I Women's All-Star team
- 2009 All-Hockey East Second-Team
- 2010 ECAC Third-Team All-Star

== Personal ==
Thibault appeared in the hockey reality show titled La série Montréal-Québec. She helped Team Quebec to hoist the television championship for an audience of over 1.5 million viewers. Stars teammate Jenny Lavigne also participated with Team Quebec.
