= Les Canadiennes de Montréal =

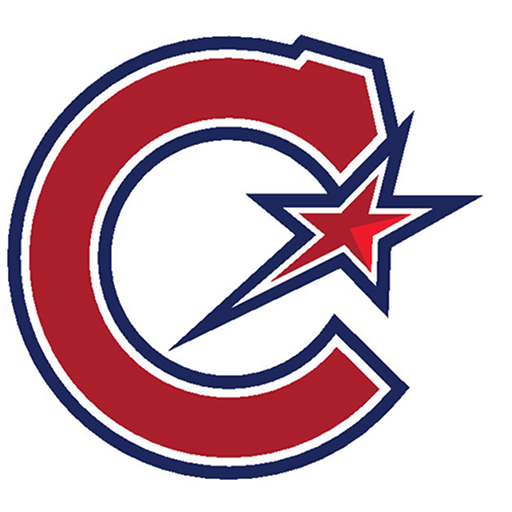
- City: Montreal, Quebec
- League: Canadian Women's Hockey League
- Founded: 2007; 19 years ago
- Folded: 2019; 7 years ago
- Home arena: Centre Étienne Desmarteau
- Colours: Red, blue, white
- General manager: Meg Hewings
- Head coach: Caroline Ouellette and Danièle Sauvageau
- Captain: Marie-Philip Poulin
- Website: montreal.thecwhl.com

Franchise history
- 2007–2015: Montréal Stars
- 2015–2019: Les Canadiennes

Championships
- Playoff championships: 4 (2008–09, 2010–11, 2011–12, 2016–17)

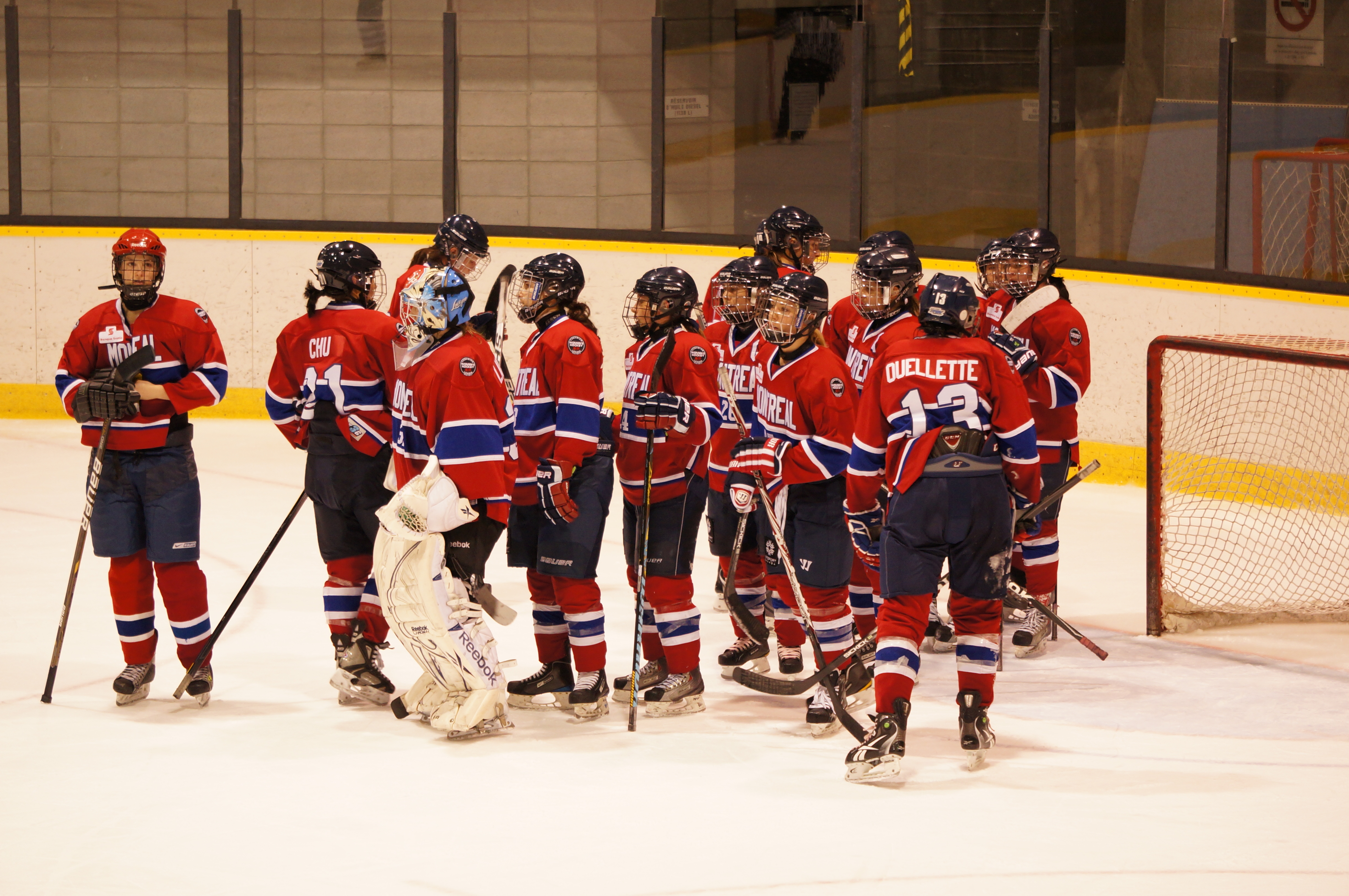
Montreal Stars 2012 championship team

Les Canadiennes de Montréal were a professional women's ice hockey team based in Montreal, Quebec, Canada. Founded in 2007 as the Montreal Stars (Stars de Montréal), they competed in the Canadian Women's Hockey League (CWHL) in every season. The team appeared in and won the Clarkson Cup the most times out of any CWHL teams with four championships.

In 2015, the team became an affiliate of the Montreal Canadiens of the National Hockey League, with the franchise providing resources and marketing support to the team as part of their efforts to help promote women's hockey. This affiliation also led to its re-branding as Les Canadiennes for the 2015–16 CWHL season, adopting colours and jerseys resembling those of their men's counterpart. In December 2015, the Canadiennes and the Boston Pride played the first outdoor game in women's professional hockey as part of festivities for the 2016 NHL Winter Classic in Foxborough, Massachusetts.

In 2019, the CWHL ceased operations, as well as all teams that it directly owned including Les Canadiennes.

== Team history ==
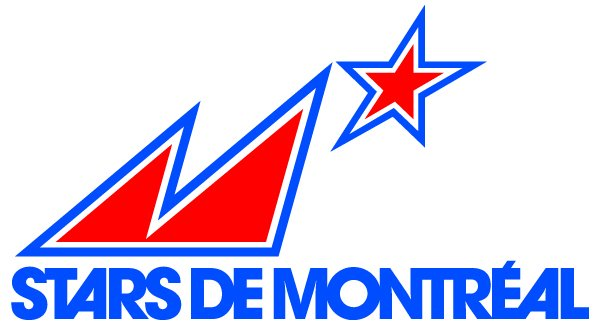
Original team logo as the Montreal Stars

=== Team origins ===
The Montreal Stars joined the CWHL during its formation in 2007. The Stars were formed from players from the Montreal Axion, a team that played in the National Women's Hockey League before its demise.

In their first season, 2007–08, Montreal won 23 games out of 30 regular season contests and finished first overall in the regular season, but lost to Mississauga Chiefs in the playoffs that year in a two-game contest.

In 2008–09, the Stars won the Clarkson Cup on March 19, 2009, in Kingston, Ontario, the first year that the Clarkson Cup was openly played for between competitive professional women's hockey clubs rather than national teams such as before with Team Canada and Team Sweden in 2006. The Clarkson Cup was won by Montreal by defeating the Minnesota Whitecaps in the final. Initially, the game was tied at one goal apiece until Montreal scored two goals. Sabrina Habrec ultimately scored the game winner, in a 3–1 final score. Former Canadian Governor General Adrienne Clarkson was on hand to present the trophy to team captain Lisa-Marie Breton-Lebreux. It was Adrienne Clarkson's hope that the Clarkson Cup be the women's equivalent to the Stanley Cup. That same season, three players were named to the First and Second team all stars: Caroline Ouellette, Kim St.Pierre and Sabrina Habrec.

The team had early success with league awards to its players. Kim St. Pierre won the CHWL's award for top goaltender in back-to-back seasons, 2007–08 and 2008–09. Caroline Ouellette was the CWHL MVP for the 2008–09, Marie-Phillip Poulin was the CWHL's rookie of the year in 2007–08 at the age of 16 scoring over 40 points in 16 games, and Sabrina Harbec led the CWHL in scoring with 54 points in 29 games that into the 2009–10 season. In 2009–10, the team finished in first place but did not defend the Clarkson Cup in the playoffs.

During the 2013–14 CWHL season, three members of the Stars reached the milestone of 100 career points during the season. It marks the first time in CWHL history that three players from the same franchise reach the century mark in the same season. It began on January 11, when CWHL co-founder Lisa-Marie Breton registered the 100th point of her career. On February 8, Vanessa Davidson earned the 100th point in her CWHL career and Emmanuelle Blais became the third in a March 8 match against the Boston Blades.

=== Montreal Canadiens partnership ===
In March 2015, the Montreal Canadiens of the National Hockey League entered into a resource-sharing and marketing partnership with the Stars. Team CEO Geoff Molson explained that given the Canadiens' support of minor hockey in Quebec and the growth of Women's hockey, he felt that it "[was] the right time to concretely support women who play professional hockey, and, at the same time, promote the sport among up-and-coming players". Brenda Andress, commissioner of the CWHL, also stated that the partnership "affords the CWHL an opportunity to grow women's hockey hand in hand with one of the most storied franchises in professional sport."

In September 2015, the team unveiled a new identity as Les Canadiennes, adopting a rounded "C" and star as its logo (alluding to the Canadiens' logo, and the team's former name), and a blue-white-red kit similar to that of the Canadiens.

In a game against the Brampton Thunder on December 13, 2015, Noemie Marin registered the 200th point of her CWHL career. She would record two assists in the game, including one on the game-winning tally, to reach the milestone.

On December 10, 2016, Les Canadiennes played a regular season game against the Calgary Inferno at the Bell Centre. They beat the Inferno 1–0, with the goal by captain Marie-Philip Poulin, in regulation in front of nearly 6000 spectators, marking a great success for the first ever CWHL hockey game to be played at the home of the Montreal Canadiens.

On December 11, 2016, Caroline Ouellette, already the league's all-time leader in points and assists, registered her 300th career point. She then tied Jayna Hefford's league record of 130 goals on January 29, 2017, finishing the season with 309 career points and 130 career goals.

In 2018, Les Canadiennes moved team operations to the home arena of the Montreal Canadiens' American Hockey League affiliate, the Laval Rocket. Les Canadiennes then scheduled some of their home games at Place Bell for the 2018–19 season.

=== 2016 Outdoor Women's Winter Classic ===
On December 31, 2015, the Canadiennes participated in an outdoor game, the 2016 Outdoor Women's Classic, against the Boston Pride of the National Women's Hockey League (NWHL) at Gillette Stadium in Foxborough, Massachusetts. The game was held as an undercard to the following day's NHL Winter Classic, which featured their teams' NHL counterparts—the Canadiens and the Boston Bruins, and was the first ever outdoor professional women's hockey game.

== Olympics ==
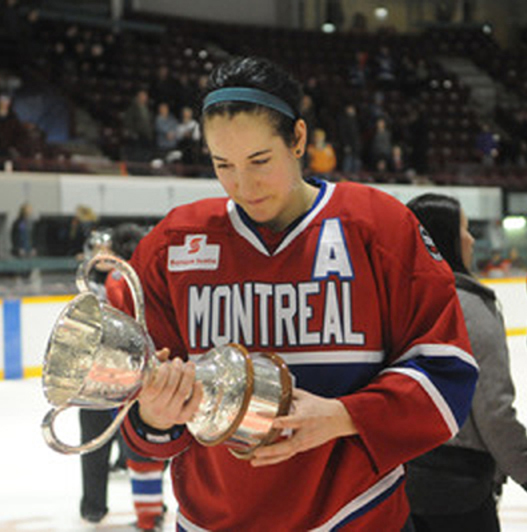
Caroline Ouellette with Clarkson Cup on March 27, 2011

The team included notable forwards Caroline Ouellette, Sarah Vaillancourt and goaltender Kim St. Pierre, all members of the 2010 Canadian Women's Hockey Olympic team who won the Olympic gold medal in Vancouver.

For the 2014 Sochi Winter Games, Stars players Ouellette, Haley Irwin, Charline Labonté and Catherine Ward competed for Team Canada, while Julie Chu was a member of Team USA.

After the 2018 Winter Games, Hilary Knight signed as a free agent with Les Canadiennes on March 8, 2018, joining the team for the 2018 Clarkson Cup playoffs.

== Social work ==
Les Canadiennes supported the fight against breast cancer with a Breast Cancer Fundraising event. For the occasion, Les Canadiennes played with pink jerseys at their annual breast cancer fundraisers. Les Canadiennes were also committed to supporting amateur girls' hockey teams, and aimed to be examples to the young girls growing up playing the sport. The "Canadiennes Camps" were one of many ways that the athletes connected with young players. They were also available to meet the girls at the autograph sessions following most of their games, and were accessible through social media, and had involvement in various community outreach events and girls' school hockey teams.

== Seasons ==
Les Canadiennes won a total of eight regular season championships and four Clarkson Cups in 12 seasons. From 2012 to 2019, the Clarkson Cup has been awarded to the CWHL playoff champion after previously being awarded to the top women's hockey team in Canada when there was multiple leagues.

=== Season-by-season ===
Year	GP	W	L	T/OTL	GF	GA	Pts	Finish	Playoffs	Clarkson Cup
2007–08	30	23	6	1	112	55	48	1st	Lost in second round	Not awarded
2008–09	30	25	4	1	135	65	51	1st	Won CWHL championship	Won 2009 Clarkson Cup
2009–10	30	23	5	2	122	70	48	1st	Won CWHL championship	Lost 2010 Clarkson Cup semifinal
2010–11	26	22	2	2	125	70	46	1st	Won CWHL championship	Won 2011 Clarkson Cup
2011–12	27	22	4	1	160	66	51	1st	Won 2012 Clarkson Cup championship game, 4–2 vs. Brampton Thunder	
2012–13	24	18	5	1	105	58	37	2nd	Lost 2013 Clarkson Cup championship game, 2–5 vs. Boston Blades	
2013–14	23	19	2	2	96	47	42	1st	Eliminated in 2014 Clarkson Cup round-robin	
2014–15	24	14	9	1	67	49	29	3rd	Lost 2015 Clarkson Cup championship game, 2–3 (OT) vs. Boston Blades	
2015–16	24	21	3	0	114	36	42	1st	Lost 2016 Clarkson Cup championship game, 3–8 vs. Calgary Inferno	
2016–17	24	17	5	2	91	48	36	2nd	Won 2017 Clarkson Cup championship game, 3–1 vs. Calgary Inferno	
2017–18	28	22	5	1	117	59	45	1st	Lost 2018 Clarkson Cup semifinals, 0–2 vs. Markham Thunder	
2018–19	28	21	6	1	118	45	43	2nd	Lost 2019 Clarkson Cup championship game, 2–5 vs. Calgary Inferno	

Note: GP = Games played, W = Wins, L = Losses, T = Ties, OTL = Overtime losses, GF = Goals for, GA = Goals against, Pts = Points.

== 2018–19 roster ==
Updated October 2, 2018.

No.	Nat	Player	Pos	S/G	Age	Acquired	Birthplace
20	(Canada)	Marie-Joelle Allard	D	L	33	2018	Victoriaville, Quebec
14	(Canada)	Erin Ambrose (A)	D	R	32	2017	Keswick, Ontario
2	(Canada)	Olivia Atkinson	F	L	29	2018	Oakville, Ontario
18	(Canada)	Genevieve Bannon	F	R	31	2018	Châteauguay, Quebec
24	(Canada)	Ann-Sophie Bettez (A)	F	L	38	2012	Sept-Îles, Quebec
47	(Canada)	Emmanuelle Blais	F	R	38	2010	Lasalle, Quebec
23	(Canada)	Sophie Brault	D	L	38	2014	Saint-Jean-sur-Richelieu, Quebec
19	(Canada)	Katia Clement-Heydra	F	L	36	2015	Saint-Bruno-de-Montarville, Quebec
12	(Canada)	Catherine Daoust	D	R	31	2018	Montreal, Quebec
15	(Canada)	Melodie Daoust (A)	F	R	33	2017	Salaberry-de-Valleyfield, Quebec
17	(Canada)	Melanie Desrochers	D	L	34	2016	Welland, Ontario
9	(Canada)	Kim Deschenes	F	L	34	2014	Saint-Quentin, New Brunswick
35	(Canada)	Marie-Soleil Deschenes	G	L	32	2017	Île Bizard, Quebec
76	(Canada)	Karell Emard	D	L	38	2015	Marieville, Quebec
22	(Canada)	Maude Gelinas	F	L	34	2018	Montreal, Quebec
21	(United States)	Hilary Knight	F	R	37	2018	Palo Alto, California
60	(Canada)	Genevieve Lacasse	G	L	37	2018	Kingston, Ontario
78	(Canada)	Tracy-Ann Lavigne	F	L	34	2017	Montreal, Quebec
16	(Canada)	Sarah Lefort	F	L	32	2016	Ormstown, Quebec
72	(Canada)	Emma Martin	D	L	30	2018	Winsloe, Prince Edward Island
38	(Canada)	Emerance Maschmeyer	G	L	31	2017	Bruderheim, Alberta
89	(Canada)	Maude Nicol	G	R	28–29	2018	Sherbrooke, Quebec
29	(Canada)	Marie-Philip Poulin (C)	F	L	35	2015	Beauceville, Quebec
5	(Canada)	Lauriane Rougeau	D	L	36	2014	Beaconsfield, Quebec
11	(Canada)	Jillian Saulnier	F	L	34	2018	Halifax, Nova Scotia
88	(Canada)	Kayla Tutino	F	R	33	2017	Lorraine, Quebec
27	(United States)	Taylor Willard	D	R	30	2018	Bolingbrook, Illinois

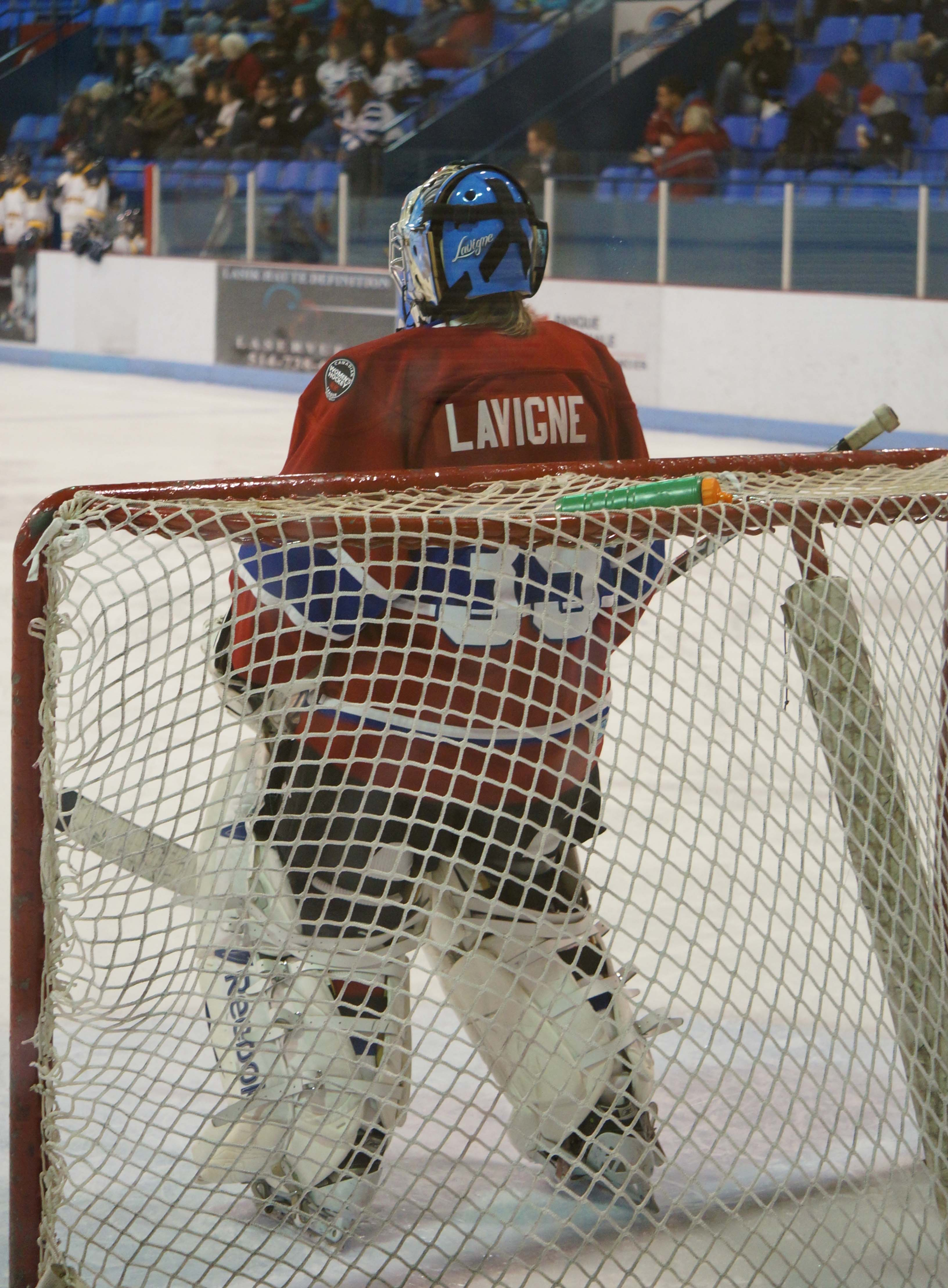
Jenny Lavigne, the Star's long-time starting goaltender, later served as an assistant coach for the team

== Awards and honours ==
- CWHL Chairman's Trophy: 2007–08, 2008–09, 2009–10, 2010–11, 2011–12, 2013–14, 2015–16.
- Jayna Hefford Trophy:
  - 2015–16, 2016–17: Marie-Philip Poulin
- CWHL Most Valuable Player:
  - 2008–09, 2010–11: Caroline Ouellette
  - 2009–10: Sabrina Harbec
  - 2011–12: Meghan Agosta
  - 2013–14: Ann-Sophie Bettez
  - 2015–16, 2016-17: Marie-Philip Poulin
- Angela James Bowl :
  - 2009–10: Sabrina Harbec
  - 2010–11: Caroline Ouellette
  - 2011–12, 2012-13: Meghan Agosta
  - 2013–14: Ann-Sophie Bettez
  - 2015–16, 2016–17 (co-winner): Marie-Philip Poulin
- CWHL Coach of the Year:
  - 2014–15: Dany Brunet
- CWHL Goals Leader:
  - 2009–10: Noemie Marin
  - 2012–13, 2013–14, 2016–17: Ann-Sophie Bettez
  - 2015–16: Marie-Philip Poulin
- CWHL Assists Leader:
  - 2008–09, 2010-11: Caroline Ouellette
  - 2009–10: Sabrina Harbec
  - 2011–12, 2012-13: Meghan Agosta
  - 2013–14, 2015-16: Ann-Sophie Bettez
  - 2016–17: Marie-Philip Poulin
- CWHL Top Forward:
  - 2009–10: Sabrina Harbec
  - 2010–11: Caroline Ouellette
  - 2011–12: Meghan Agosta
  - 2013–14: Ann-Sophie Bettez
  - 2015–16, 2016–17: Marie-Philip Poulin
- CWHL Top Defender:
  - 2009–10: Annie Guay
  - 2011–12, 2012-13: Catherine Ward
  - 2013–14: Cathy Chartrand
- CWHL Top Goaltender:
  - 2007–08, 2008–09, 2010–11: Kim St-Pierre
  - 2014–15, 2015–16, 2016–17: Charline Labonté
- CWHL Outstanding Rookie:
  - 2007–08: Marie-Philip Poulin
  - 2010–11: Sarah Vaillancourt
  - 2012–13: Ann-Sophie Bettez
- Humanitarian of the Year Award:
  - 2015–16: Lisa-Marie Breton-Lebreux
- Cathy Chartrand, 2012–13 and 2013–14 leading scorer among CWHL defenders

== Captains ==
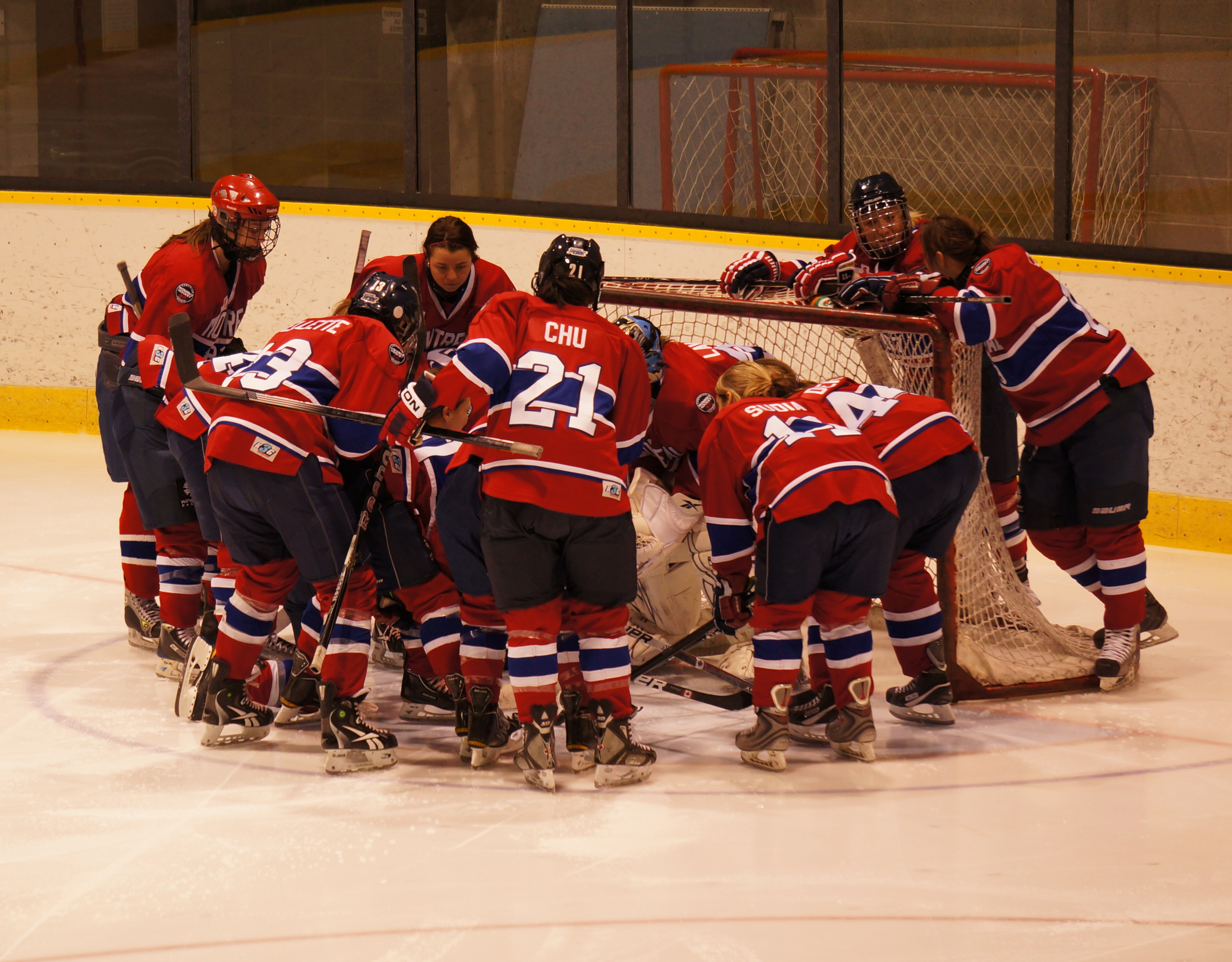
The Stars discussing strategy

Season	Captain	Alternate captains
2007–08	Lisa-Marie Breton	
2008–09	Lisa-Marie Breton	
2009–10	Lisa-Marie Breton	
2010–11	Lisa-Marie Breton	Nathalie Dery, Caroline Ouellette, Kelly Sudia
2011–12	Lisa-Marie Breton	Nathalie Dery, Caroline Ouellette, Kelly Sudia
2012–13	Lisa-Marie Breton	
2013–14	Cathy Chartrand	
2014–15	Cathy Chartrand	
2015–16	Cathy Chartrand	Caroline Ouellette, Ann-Sophie Bettez, Noémie Marin
2016–17	Marie-Philip Poulin	Caroline Ouellette, Cathy Chartrand, Ann-Sophie Bettez

== Scoring leaders ==
=== Season-by-season ===
Season	Leader (F)	GP	G	A	Pts	Leader (D)	GP	G	A	Pts	PPG	SHG	GWG
2010–11	Caroline Ouellette	29	24	47	71	Annie Guay	29	13	19	32	Noemie Marin (6)	Three tied with 2	Noemie Marin (7)
2011–12	Meghan Agosta	27	41	39	80	Catherine Ward	27	2	29	31	Four tied with 5	Agosta (2)	Agosta (5)
2012–13	Meghan Agosta	23	16	30	46	Cathy Chartrand	23	5	15	20	Emmanuelle Blais (4)	Three tied with 1	Five tied with 3
2013–14	Ann-Sophie Bettez	23	16	24	40	Cathy Chartrand	23	9	21	30	Vinny Davidson (8)	Two tied with 2	Bettez (7)
2014–15	Caroline Ouellette	22	8	18	26	Cathy Chartrand	22	5	12	17	Noemie Marin (7)		Ouellette (2)
2015–16	Marie-Philip Poulin	22	23	23	46	Lauriane Rougeau	22	2	17	19	Ann-Sophie Bettez (7)	Caroline Ouellette (2)	Ouellette (7)
2016–17	Marie-Philip Poulin	23	15	22	37	Cathy Chartrand	24	3	15	18	Caroline Ouellette tied with Jess Jones (5)	Ann-Sophie Bettez (3)	Marie-Philip Poulin (6)

=== See also ===
- 2010–11 Montreal Stars season
- 2011–12 Montreal Stars season
- Montreal Axion

== Other sources ==
- Montreal 2011 Clarkson Cup Champions, March 27, 2011.
- Montreal wins Clarkson Cup. March 28, 2011.
- St-Pierre backstops Montreal to Clarkson Cup title in CBC news, March 27, 2011.
- Montreal Stars win women's national hockey championship, in CBC news, March 21, 2009.
- First Clarkson Cup stays in Canada, Slam sports, March 22, 2009.
- McGill grads help Stars capture Clarkson Cup McGill newspaper, March 21, 2009
- (in French) Stars de Montréal old blog
