= Sabrina Harbec =

Canadian ice hockey player

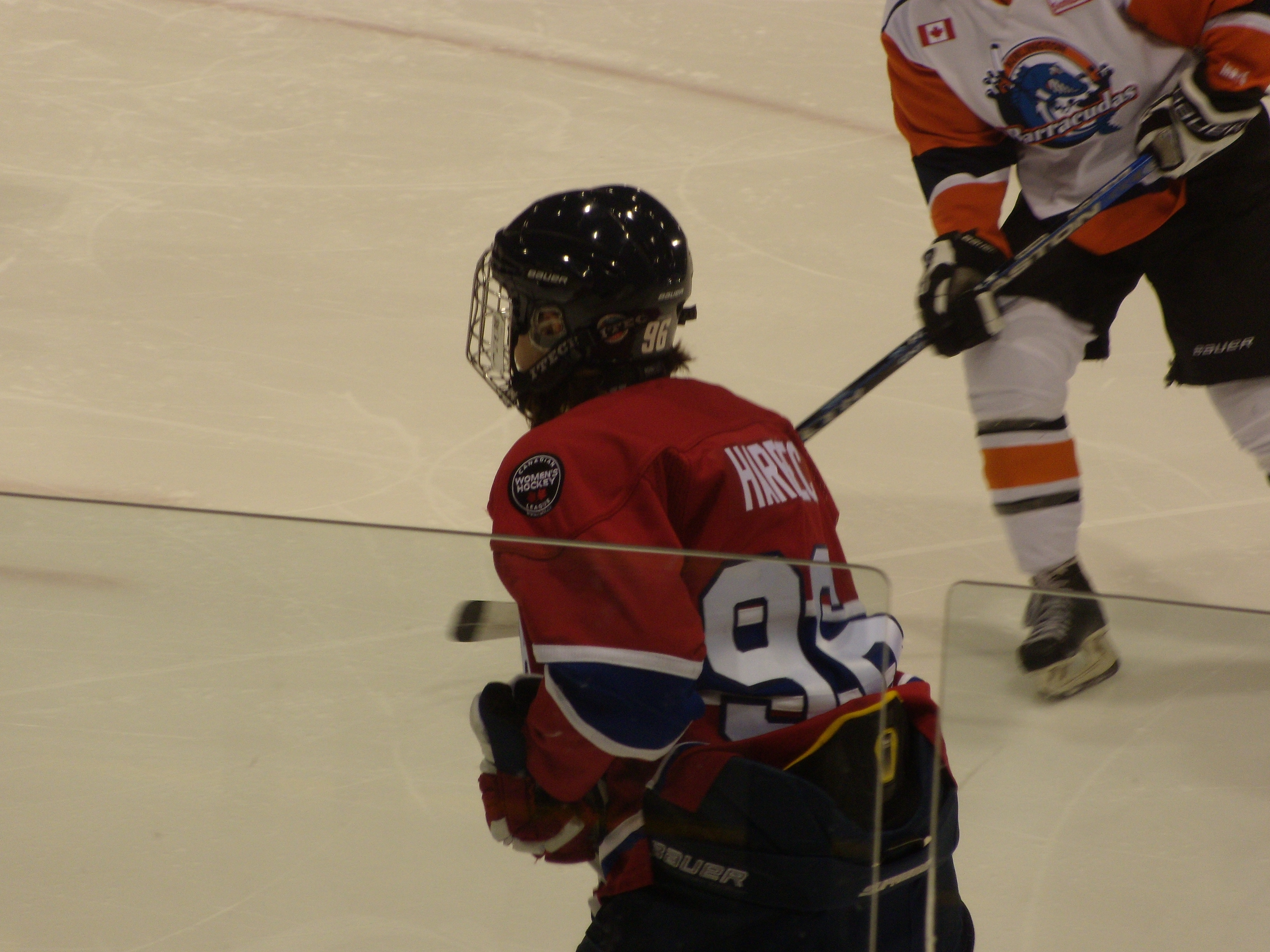
- Born: March 20, 1985 (age 40) Saint-Hubert, Quebec, Canada
- Height: 5 ft 8 in (173 cm)
- Weight: 150 lb (68 kg; 10 st 10 lb)
- Position: Forward
- Shoots: Left
- NCAA CWHL team: St. Lawrence; Montreal Stars
- National team: Canada
- Playing career: 2004–present

Sabrina Harbec
Medal record

Women's ice hockey

Representing Canada

Air Canada Cup
Gold medal – first place	2005 Germany	2005 Tournament
Gold medal – first place	2006 Germany	2006 Tournament

Sabrina Harbec (born March 20, 1985) is a hockey player and the third winner of the Angela James Bowl after leading the CWHL with 15 goals and 39 assists in 29 games. Her performance helped the Stars finish first overall in league standings for the third straight season (2009–2010) and she became the fifth CWHL player to break the career 100-point barrier, in 2010, when she was selected as the league's Most Valuable Player (as voted by captains), the CWHL Top Forward (by captains and coaches), and a CWHL First Team All-Star (unanimous selection). Prior to playing for the Montreal Stars, Harbec competed in NCAA hockey for the St. Lawrence Skating Saints women's ice hockey program. She is currently in the Top 10 in all-time NCAA scoring with 219 career points. She was the 2006 ECAC player of the year. Known by many as one of the few female player-contestants on La série Montréal-Québec 2010 on French-Canadian television, Harbec wears the number 96 with the Montreal Stars as a tribute to Wayne Gretzky and Mario Lemieux.

Nicknamed Sab by her teammates, she started playing at the age of 5, accompanied on the ice by her father and two brothers. She worked in 2010 and 2011 as an assistant with the Syracuse University Division 1 women's hockey team, started her working career in the mining industry thanks to a master's degree in math and education. She then pursued a career in the energy transition, serving as a Director at Hydro-Québec in Montréal, and more recently at Nordex, a German wind turbine manufacturing company.

== Playing career ==
=== St. Lawrence ===
In 2006, Harbec was a top three finalist for the Patty Kazmaier Memorial Award. She was the first St. Lawrence player to be a finalist for the award. She is the Saints all-time leading scorer with 217 career points.

=== Hockey Canada ===
- Harbec tried out for the 2008 Canadian National team and was part of the Hockey Canada Fall Festival in the autumn of 2007.

=== Montreal Stars ===
At the 2009 Clarkson Cup, Harbec scored the game-winning goal in the second game of the two game series against the Minnesota Whitecaps. In 2009-10, Harbec won the Angela James Bowl after leading the CWHL in scoring with 55 points. She won the league scoring race by 11 points, finishing ahead of runner-up Lindsay Vine. She helped the Stars finish first overall in league standings for the third-straight season. Before season's end, she became the fifth CWHL player to break the career 100-point barrier. At year's end, she was selected the league's Most Valuable Player (as voted by captains), the CWHL Top Forward (by captains and coaches), and a CWHL First Team All-Star (unanimous selection). In the championship game of the 2011 Clarkson Cup, Harbec scored a goal.

== Coaching career ==
Harbec was hired as an assistant coach for the Syracuse Orange women's ice hockey program. She was an assistant for the 2010-11 season.

== Career stats ==
=== St. Lawrence ===
Year	Games Played	Goals	Assists	Points	Power Play Goals	Shorthanded Goals
2004-2005	37	16	20	36	3	1
2005-2006	36	25	36	61	9	2
2006-2007	38	26	44	70	4	3
2007-2008	37	18	34	52	6	2

== Awards and honours ==
- Angela James Bowl winner, 2009–10
- CWHL Most Valuable Player, 2009–10
- CWHL Top Forward, 2009–10
- Top three finalist for the 2006 Patty Kazmaier Memorial Award.
- Sabrina Harbec, First Team All-America selection (2006)
- Sabrina Harbec, All-America honors (2007)
- Sabrina Harbec, All-America honors (2008)
- Sabrina Harbec, 2007 ECAC All-Tournament team

Preceded by Jayna Hefford (2009)	Angela James Bowl; 2010	Succeeded by Caroline Ouellette (2011)
