= Canada women's national inline hockey team =

Canada
- Nickname: Team Canada (Équipe Canada)
- Association: Canada Inline
- Team colors: Red, black, white

World Championships
- Appearances: 16 (first in 2002)
- Best result: (gold) (2002, 2004, 2005, 2012, 2016)

Medal record

World Championships
Gold medal – first place	2016 Italy	
Gold medal – first place	2012 Colombia	
Gold medal – first place	2005 France	
Gold medal – first place	2004 Canada	
Gold medal – first place	2002 United States	
Silver medal – second place	2014 France	
Silver medal – second place	2013 United States	
Silver medal – second place	2011 Italy	
Silver medal – second place	2010 Germany	
Silver medal – second place	2008 Germany	
Silver medal – second place	2006 United States	
Silver medal – second place	2003 Czech Republic	
Bronze medal – third place	2017 China	
Bronze medal – third place	2009 Italy	

Canada women's national inline hockey team is the national team for Canada, which participates at the FIRS Inline Hockey World Championships, an event by the Comité International de Roller In-Line Hockey (CIRILH), an organization and discipline of the Fédération Internationale de Roller Sports (FIRS). The national team has captured five world championships (2002, 2004, 2005, 2012 and 2016). Canada has enjoyed 14 podium finishes in the FIRS Inline Hockey World Championships from 2002 to 2025. The first tournament without a podium finish took place in 2007.

== History ==
The team finished second at the 2011 Women's World Inline Hockey Championships. The team competed in the 2013 Women's World Inline Hockey Championships. Winning a gold medal at the 2016 Worlds, hosted in Asiago and Roana, Veneto region, Italy, between June 12–25, 2016, it marked the last gold medal currently won by Canada.

=== Former coaches ===
- Jeff Danylyk (2002)
- Robert Insley (2003)
- Gino Delmonte (2004-08)
- Kendra Magnus-Sobotka (2009-11)
- Donna Forbes (2012-present)

=== General managers ===
- Sandy Nimmo (2002)
- Robert Coughlin (2003-04)
- Gino Delmonte (2006-08)
- Donna Forbes

== Competition achievements ==
=== World Championships ===
Year	Location	Result
2002	Rochester, New York, United States	Champions
2003	Pisek, Czech Republic	Runners-up
2004	London, Ontario, Canada	Champions
2005	Paris, France	Champions
2006	Detroit, Michigan, United States	Runners-up
2008	Ratingen, Germany	Runners-up
2009	Varese, Italy	Third place
2010	Beroun, Czech Republic	Runners-up
2011	Roccaraso, Italy	Runners-up
2012	Bucaramanga, Colombia	Champions
2013	Huntington Beach, California, United States	Runners-up
2014	Toulouse, France	Runners-up
2016	Asiago and Roana, Veneto region, Italy	Champions
2017	Nanjing, China	Third place

== Gold Medal Winning Rosters ==
=== 2002 ===
2002 Team Canada - FIRS World Champions
Roster
Forwards: Annie Desrosier; Andria Hunter; Leslie MacFarlane; Kate MacNamara; Teresa Marchese; Cherie Piper	Defense: Cathy Chartrand; Ingrid Danylyk; Nicole Dosser; Donna Forbes	Goaltenders: Keely Brown	Administration: Jeff Danylyk (head coach); Karol Vudgrag (Therapist); Sandy Nimmo (general manager)

=== 2004 ===
2004 Team Canada - FIRS World Champions
Roster
Forwards: Meghan Agosta; Shannon Bowman; Annie Desrosier; Katherine Deveraux; Nancy MacDonald; Teresa Marchese; Caroline Ouellette; Cherie Piper; Amanda Shaw; Amy Turek	Defense: Amanda Benoit-Wark; Isabelle Chartrand; Ingrid Danylyk; Nicole Dosser; Donna Forbes	Goaltenders: Keely Brown; Charline Labonte	Administration: Gino Delmonte (head coach); Kendra Magnus (assistant coach); Kirsten Krepps (trainer); Robert Coughlin (general manager)

=== 2005 ===
2005 Team Canada - FIRS World Champions
Roster
Forwards: Lisa-Marie Breton; Latoya Clarke; Katherine Deveraux; Teresa Marchese; Samantha Shirley	Defense: Kristie Carneiro; Isabelle Chartrand; Nicole Dosser; Donna Forbes	Goaltenders: Keely Brown; Quinn Caggiula	Administration: Kendra Magnus (coach); Gino Delmonte (general manager)

=== 2012 ===
2012 Team Canada - FIRS World Champions
Roster
Forwards: Michelle Bonello; Latoya Clarke; Nicole Collier; Joanne Eustace; Jackie Jarrell; Brooke Ludolph; Montana Merante; Amanda Parkins; Dana Somerville; Jessica Sorensen	Defense: Katherine Deveraux-Simoes; Lindsay Grigg; Amanda Reid	Goaltenders: Kendra Fisher; Amanda Squire	Administration: Donna Forbes (coach); Keely Brown (assistant coach); Stephen Marcoux (assistant coach)

=== 2016 ===
Incomplete list

2016 Team Canada - FIRS World Champions
Roster
Forwards: Alyssa Andres; Alyssa Baldin; Michelle Bonello; LaToya Clarke; Brayden Ferguson; Jackie Jarrell; Brooke Ludolph; Montana Merante; Sarah Power; Dana Somerville; Jessica Sorensen	Defense: Lindsay Grigg; Amanda Reid; Christina Sorbara	Goaltenders: Kendra Fisher; Alexandra Frisk	Administration: Dave Hammond (head coach); Keely Brown (assistant coach); Michael Hunt (assistant coach); Donna Forbes (team manager); Meka Trepanier (team manager); Ben Frank (Canada Inline President)

== Awards and honors ==
- 2012 World Inline Championship Leading Scorer: Jackie Jarrell
