= Kori Cheverie =

Canadian ice hockey player and coach

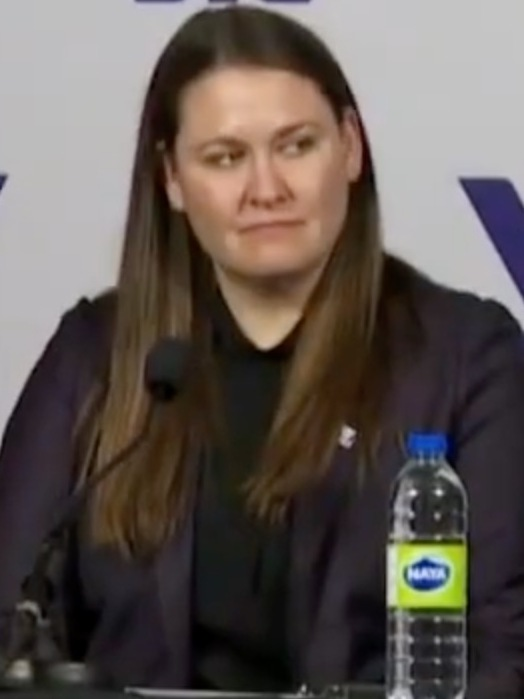
- Cheverie in 2024

Current position
- Title: Head coach
- Team: Montreal Victoire
- Conference: Professional Women's Hockey League

Biographical details
- Born: June 18, 1987 (age 39); New Glasgow, Nova Scotia, Canada
- Education: Saint Mary's University

Playing career
- 2005–2010: Saint Mary's Huskies
- 2010–2016: Toronto Furies
- Position: Forward

Coaching career (HC unless noted)
- 2016–2023: Ryerson Rams (assistant)
- 2018–19: Canada U18 women's (assistant)
- 2021–present: Canada women's (assistant)
- 2024–present: Montreal Victoire
Medal record
Women's ice hockey
Representing Canada
Universiade
Gold medal – first place	2009 Harbin	Ice hockey
Representing Canada (as coach)
World U18 Championship
Gold medal – first place	2019 Japan
World Championships
Gold medal – first place	2021 Canada

Kori Cheverie (born June 18, 1987) is a Canadian former professional ice hockey player, currently serving as the head coach for the Montreal Victoire of the Professional Women's Hockey League (PWHL). She is also the head coach of the Canadian national women's ice hockey team. She was previously the assistant coach for the TMU Bold men's ice hockey team. She was the first woman to be hired to a full-time coaching role in U Sports men's ice hockey history.

Cheverie's playing career was spent with the Saint Mary's Huskies women's ice hockey team in the Atlantic University Sport conference of Canadian Interuniversity Sport (CIS; renamed U Sports in 2016) and with the Toronto Furies of the Canadian Women's Hockey League (CWHL), with whom she won the 2014 Clarkson Cup.

== Playing career ==
=== CIS ===
With the St. Mary's Huskies women's ice hockey program, Cheverie was an Academic All-Canadian, team captain and multiple conference nominee for the Marion Hillard Award.

=== CWHL ===
A charter member of the Toronto Furies, Cheverie spent six years with the franchise, starting in their inaugural season of 2010-11.

Cheverie made her CWHL debut on October 23, 2010, in a 7–3 loss against the Brampton Thunder. In the second period, Cheverie scored a power play goal, assisted by LaToya Clarke and fellow rookie Tessa Bonhomme . She scored on Erika Vanderveer, who would become a future Furies teammate during the 2012–13 season.

Twice during her rookie season, she registered a pair of three point performances, both against the Boston Blades. The first occurred on January 9, 2011, in 9–4 final, while the second took place on March 11, 2011.

She would finish her rookie season third on the team in scoring, behind fellow rookie Britni Smith (who went on to win the 2011 CWHL Rookie of the Year Award) and Jennifer Botterill.

She played for the Furies until 2016 and retired with three franchise records: points (82), games played (152) and power play goals (14). In addition, she holds the league record for most consecutive games played with 152.

The final points of her CWHL career occurred in her final regular season game, a February 14, 2016 contest against the Brampton Thunder. Cheverie logged a pair of power play goals in the third period to force overtime. Her final goal was scored at the 18:39 mark of the third period, with Natalie Spooner and Kelly Terry earning the assists. Cheverie would finish the 2015–16 season leading the Furies in game-winning goals while ranking second to Spooner in team scoring, respectively.

=== International hockey ===
In January 2009, Cheverie was named to the team that competed at the International University Sports Federation (FISU) Winter Universiade in Harbin, China. She would be part of the Canadian squad that would claim the gold medal in the women's ice hockey event.

Cheverie also competed internationally with the Italian women's national ball hockey team. Participating at the 2015 World Championship, she led the tournament in penalty minutes and tallied three points.

As a walk-on member of the Italian team, she appeared in all of the team's seven games. Her first point came on a June 23 match against Switzerland, a 6–2 victory for Italy. During the second period, Cheverie scored a power play goal as Annalisa Mazzarello and Nicole Corriero earned the assists.

On June 27, Cheverie registered her only multi-point game at the event, logging a goal and an assist in a 3–1 victory against Great Britain. She would assist on a goal scored by Corriero, while scoring Italy's final goal of the game.

== Coaching career ==
In addition to her coaching role with the TMU Bold (previously Ryerson Rams) men's ice hockey team, Cheverie has also worked as Ryerson's Skate Training Specialist. Her work as a specialist was implemented as part of the Ryerson Hockey Development program.

Cheverie joined the Scarborough Sharks Midget AA girls team during the 2015–16 season as an assistant coach. She was appointed the Sharks head coach in the summer of 2016. During the summer of 2016, she also worked with referee Vanessa Stratton in New Zealand, working with the coaching staff of the New Zealand women's national ice hockey team to help develop the game there.

Prior to Ryerson and Midget AA, Cheverie served as a coach with Hockey Nova Scotia from April to August 2012, coaching youth aged 15–17 years old. In the summer of 2014, Cheverie went to Shanghai and Beijing to participate in a hockey camp for kids. From August 2013 to August 2014, Cheverie also held a position with Maple Leaf Sports & Entertainment in Hockey Development and Community Relations.

On January 18, 2021, Hockey Canada announced that Cheverie had been named to the coaching staff of the Canadian national women's team.

In September 2023, she was named the inaugural head coach of PWHL Montreal of the PWHL.

On May 20, 2026, she coached the Montreal Victoire to their first Walter Cup championship in the 2026 Walter Cup playoffs, becoming the first female head coach to win the trophy. This was also the first time the Cup was won by a Canadian team.

On September 24, 2026, Cheverie was named the head coach of the Canadian national women's ice hockey team for the 2026-27 season.

== Career stats ==
Season/Year	Team	League/Event	GP	G	A	PTS	PIM	+/-
2005	Nova Scotia	Esso Women's Nationals	5	6	1	7	8
2007	Nova Scotia	Esso Women's Nationals	7	3	1	4	4
2008	Nova Scotia	Esso Women's Nationals	5	1	4	5	6
2010-11	Toronto Furies	CWHL	30	10	14	24	20	+11
2011-12	Toronto Furies	CWHL	27	14	6	20	16	+13
2012-13	Toronto Furies	CWHL	24	0	2	2	22	-7
2013-14	Toronto Furies	CWHL	23	5	11	16	12	+9
2014-15	Toronto Furies	CWHL	24	0	2	2	6	-10
2015-16	Toronto Furies	CWHL	24	8	10	18	20	-5
2015	Italia	ISBHF Worlds	7	2	1	3	34

== Awards and honours ==
- 2006-07 AUS First Team All-Star
- 2007-08 AUS First Team All-Star
- 2009-10 AUS First Team All-Star
- 2006-07 CIS Academic All-Canadian
- 2006-07 AUS Marion Hilliard Award winner, nominee CIS Marion Hilliard Award
- 2007-08 AUS Marion Hilliard Award winner, nominee CIS Marion Hilliard Award
- 2008-09 AUS Marion Hilliard Award winner, nominee CIS Marion Hilliard Award
- 2006-07 Saint Mary's Female Athlete of the Year
- 2007-08 Saint Mary's Female Athlete of the Year
- 2006-07 Most Valuable Player for St. Mary's women's hockey
- 2007-08 Most Valuable Player for St. Mary's women's hockey
- 2008-09 Most Valuable Player for St. Mary's women's hockey
- 2025 PWHL Coach of the Year
