= Samantha Shirley =

Canadian ice hockey and inline hockey player (born 1983)

Personal information
- Born: 2 May 1983 (age 43) Mississauga, Ontario, Canada
- Education: Mercyhurst University

Sport
- Sport: Inline hockey
- Position: Forward
- Shoots: Right
- Team: Canada
Ice hockey career
- Position: Forward
- Shot: Right
- Played for: Mercyhurst Lakers; EV Zug Damen; Vaughan Flames; Burlington Barracudas
- Playing career: 2001–2012
Medal record
Women's inline hockey
World Championship
Gold medal – first place	2005 France
Silver medal – second place	2011 Italy
Silver medal – second place	2010 Germany
Silver medal – second place	2008 Germany
Silver medal – second place	2006 United States
Bronze medal – third place	2009 Italy

Samantha Shirley (born 2 May 1983) is a Canadian retired ice hockey and inline hockey player. She won medals at six FIRS Inline Hockey World Championships with the Canadian women's national inline hockey team.

== Playing career ==
=== Ice hockey ===
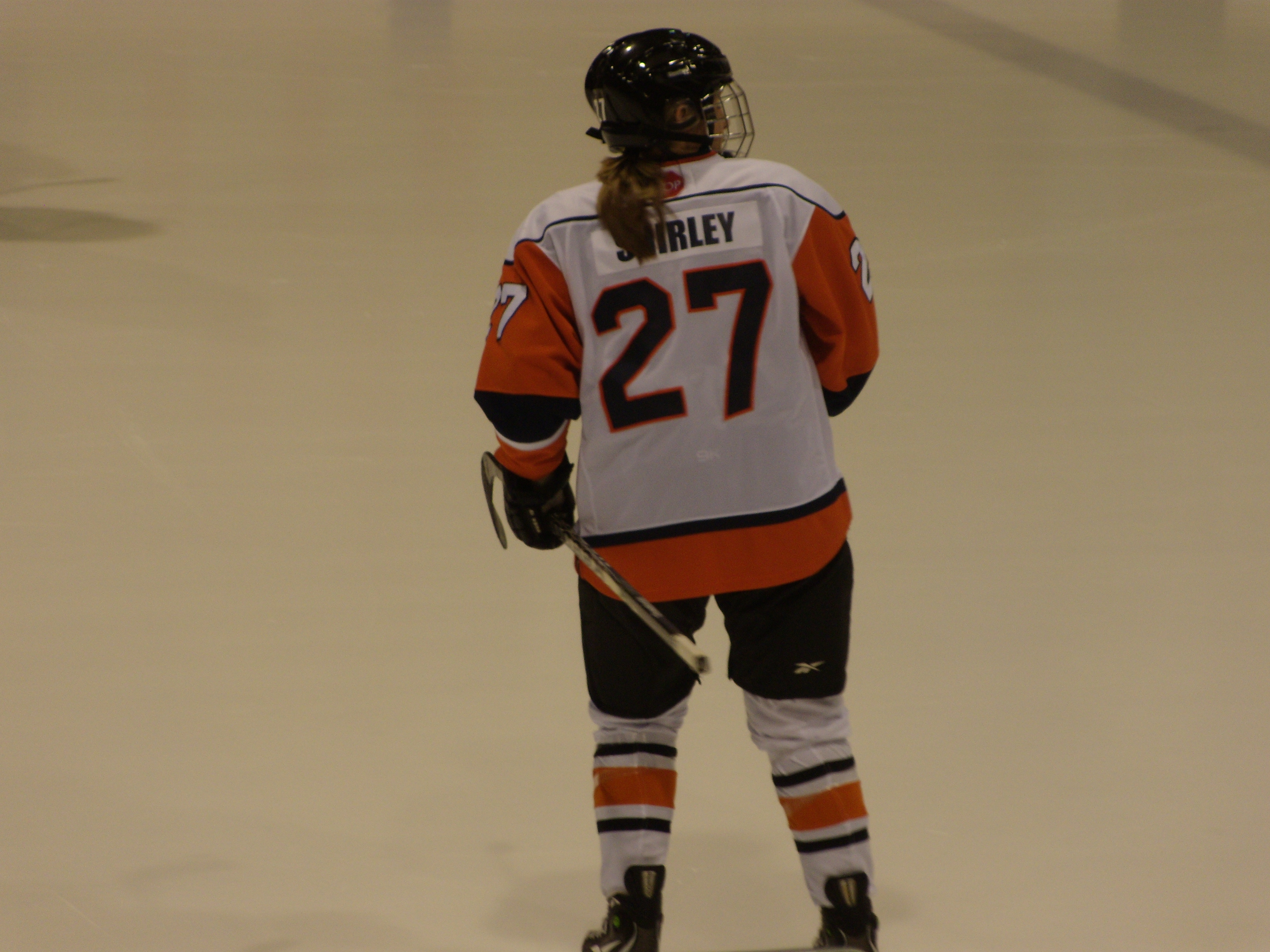
Samantha Shirley in action with the Burlington Barracudas

Shirley joined the Mercyhurst Lakers women's ice hockey program in the autumn of 2002. Tying for the team lead in the 2002–03 Mercyhurst Lakers women's ice hockey season, Shirley captured the College Hockey America Rookie of the Year Award. Serving as team captain for the 2005–06 Mercyhurst Lakers women's ice hockey season, gracing the ice in all 37 games. Her 11 goals ranked fourth while her 26 points ranked fifth on the Lakers. Of her 11 goals, three were game winners.

Following Mercyhurst, Shirley turned professional, joining the Switzerland women's ice hockey league EV Zug Damen for their 2006–07 season. The following season, she would join the Vaughan Flames of the newly formed Canadian Women's Hockey League. Of note, she would spend the last two seasons of her CWHL career competing for the Burlington Barracudas. Shirley appeared in 121 regular season games in CWHL play.

On 18 November 2011, Shirley was one of several Burlington Barracudas players (including Christina Kessler, Shannon Moulson, Ashley Stephenson, Jana Harrigan, Amanda Shaw, Annina Rajahuhta, Amanda Parkins, and Lindsay Vine) that competed in the first ever Hockey Helps the Homeless Women's Tournament. Said tournament was held at the Magna Centre in Newmarket, Ontario.

=== Inline hockey ===
Debuting with the national team in 2005, Shirley captured her first gold medal at the FIRS Inline Hockey World Championships.

Versus host Italy at the 2009 FIRS Worlds, Shirley scored a pair of goals in a 6-0 Canadian victory, clinching a semi-final berth.

Earlier in the tournament, Shirley registered a goal and two assists in a convincing 13–2 rout of Australia. A Canada Day 2009 contest versus Team Finland resulted in a 15–3 victory, as Shirley scored twice.

At the 2010 FIRS Worlds, it marked Shirley's fifth consecutive appearance with the Canadian contingent.

As a side note, former Mercyhurst Lakers teammates, Michelle Bonello and Jackie Jarrell, also spent time with the Inline National Team.

== Awards and honors ==
=== NCAA ===
- 2003 All-CHA Rookie Team
- 2003 CHA All-Tournament Team
- 2003 CHA Rookie-of-the-Year
- CHA Offensive Player of the Week (week of November 10, 2003)
- CHA Offensive Player of the Week (week of December 8, 2003)
- CHA Offensive Player of the Week (week of January 13, 2004)
- CHA Offensive Player of the Week (week of January 27, 2004)
- 2004 CHA First Team All-Star
- 2004 CHA All-Academic Team
- 2005 CHA All-Conference Second Team

=== Other ===
- Samantha Shirley, Toronto Orange Crush: Top Scorer – 2007 CBHA Women's Nationals
