= Jackie Jarrell =

Canadian ice hockey player

- Born: May 16, 1985 (age 41) Corbyville, Ontario, Canada
- Height: 5 ft 5 in (165 cm)
- Position: Forward
- Shot: Left
- team: Canada women's national inline hockey team
- Played for: Durham Lightning; Mercyhurst Lakers
- Playing career: 2002–2024
Medal record
FIRS Inline Hockey World Championships
Gold medal – first place	2016 Italy
Gold medal – first place	2012 Colombia
Silver medal – second place	2014 France
Silver medal – second place	2013 United States
Silver medal – second place	2011 Italy
Silver medal – second place	2010 Germany
Silver medal – second place	2008 Germany
Silver medal – second place	2006 United States
Bronze medal – third place	2017 China
Bronze medal – third place	2009 Italy

Jackie Jarrell (born May 16, 1985) is a former women's ice hockey player and current member of the Canada women's national inline hockey team, having debuted in 2006.

== Playing career ==
=== Ice hockey ===
Having played minor hockey with a pair of boys teams, the Belleville Bobcats (AA level) and the Quinte Red Devils (AAA level), she would join the Durham Lightning of the original NWHL at 16 years young. In addition, Jarrell would win a gold medal at the 2003 Canada Winter Games, playing for Team Ontario.

Jarrell joined the Mercyhurst Lakers women's ice hockey program in the autumn of 2003. Amassing 19 points in her freshman campaign (2003–04), she would miss the 2005–06 season due to concussion. Named an alternate captain for the 2006-07 campaign, she would graduate in 2008, having appeared in 99 games for the Lakers, winning four conference championships.

=== Inline hockey ===
Introduced to inline hockey as a means of training for her ice hockey endeavors, Jarrell first joined the national team in 2006, becoming an assistant captain in 2011. Having played for Canada at 10 FIRS Inline Hockey World Championships, she has captured two gold medals, six silver medals and two bronze medals. As a side note, former Mercyhurst Lakers teammates, Michelle Bonello and Samantha Shirley, also spent time with the Inline National Team.

Jarrell's first gold medal came at the 2012 World Championships in Bucaramanga, Colombia, with the squad enjoying a 6–0 record. As a side note, Bonello was also a member of the Canadian contingent.

Four years later, at the 2016 FIRS World Inline Hockey Championships, contested at the Hodegart Arena Asiago in Italy, Canada defeated the United States to capture the gold medal. In the championship game, Jarrell recorded a goal and an assist. Four minutes into the contest, she assisted on a goal by Montana Merante, while she recorded a third period goal.

The 2017 edition of the World Championships, hosted in Nanjing, China, marked Jarrell's tenth appearance at the Worlds. Opposing the Czech Republic in the bronze medal game, prevailing in a 3–1 final, it also signified her tenth podium finish in Worlds play. Having retired from the national team due to back injuries, Jarrell served as the team's Strength and Conditioning Coach in 2018.

Coming out of retirement in 2019, Jarrell had 10 points in Canada's first three games at the 2019 World Women's In-Line Hockey Championship in Barcelona, Spain. Logging a goal and an assist in an 8–0 win over Sweden, with Canada improving to 3–0, she also contributed a hat-trick in a victory against India.

2012 Team Canada - FIRS World Champions
Roster
Forwards: Michelle Bonello; Latoya Clarke; Nicole Collier; Joanne Eustace; Jackie Jarrell; Brooke Ludolph; Montana Merante; Amanda Parkins; Dana Somerville; Jessica Sorensen	Defense: Katherine Deveraux-Simoes; Lindsay Grigg; Amanda Reid	Goaltenders: Kendra Fisher; Amanda Squire	Administration: Donna Forbes (coach); Keely Brown (assistant coach); Stephen Marcoux (assistant coach)

2016 Team Canada - FIRS World Champions
Roster
Forwards: Alyssa Andres; Alyssa Baldin; Michelle Bonello; LaToya Clarke; Brayden Ferguson; Jackie Jarrell; Brooke Ludolph; Montana Merante; Sarah Power; Dana Somerville; Jessica Sorensen	Defense: Lindsay Grigg; Amanda Reid; Christina Sorbara	Goaltenders: Kendra Fisher; Alexandra Frisk	Administration: Dave Hammond (head coach); Keely Brown (assistant coach); Michael Hunt (assistant coach); Donna Forbes (team manager); Meka Trepanier (team manager); Ben Frank (Canada Inline President)

== Training ==
Jarrell became the province of Ontario's first ever Trained ImPACT Athletic Trainer. In the Quinte area, Jarrell has developed ImPACT Baseline and Post-Injury Concussion Testing for numerous organizations. Additionally, she returned to her competitive roots, serving as a trainer for the Quinte Red Devils, also implementing her Concussion program to ensure a safe return to play. In 2016, she was one of three members from the Red Devils to attend the OHL Combine at Oshawa's General Motors Centre.

For more than a decade, Jarrell also worked with the now defunct Belleville Bulls of the Ontario Hockey League in the capacity of head female trainer at their annual summer hockey camps. Among the athletes she worked with at said camps included future CWHL All-Star Hanna Bunton. Named a Fitness Consultant with the NHL Officials Academy, Jarrell was also featured by the NHL Network, named a "female who is breaking barriers".

== Career statistics ==
			Regular season
Season	Team	League	GP	G	A	Pts	PIM
2002-03	Durham Lightning	NWHL	29	8	14	22	2
2003-04	Mercyhurst Lakers	CHA	36	10	9	19	8
2004-05	Mercyhurst Lakers	CHA	10	5	2	7	4
2006-07	Mercyhurst Lakers	CHA	31	3	6	9	4
2007-08	Mercyhurst Lakers	CHA	22	3	1	4	4

== Awards and honors ==
Winning the Robinson-Kelleher Memorial Award as Belleville's Athlete of the Year for 2012, Jarrell was only the tenth woman to win the award.

- 2012 World Inline Championship Leading Scorer
- 2012 Robinson Kelleher Memorial Award: given to Belleville's Athlete of the Year
- 2019 Quinte Region Young Entrepreneur of the Year: Jackie Jarrell – Gold Performance Training

== Personal ==
Graduating with a Bachelor of Science Degree in Sports Medicine at Mercyhurst, she would also complete a master's degree in Exercise Science in 2013. Also earning an Education Degree from Queen's University at Kingston, Jarrell is an entrepreneur. Building a 6400 square foot facility in Belleville, Ontario, in close proximity to her parents dairy farm, Jarrell opened Gold Performance Training in August 2015. Ten years later, Jarrell married on August 1, 2025.
