= 2010–11 Toronto CWHL season =

Women's hockey team season

The 2010–11 Toronto CWHL season was the first season for the team that became known as the Toronto Furies at the end of the season. The Canadian Women's Hockey League underwent a restructuring prior to the 2010–11 CWHL season that led to the folding of three teams and the creation of a new Toronto team. It also head held its first draft in 2010 for its three Greater Toronto Area teams, where the Toronto CWHL team protected former Mississauga Chiefs' players Jennifer Botterill and Sami Jo Small. The Toronto team then proceeded to pick many other former Chiefs' players to make up the majority of the new team.

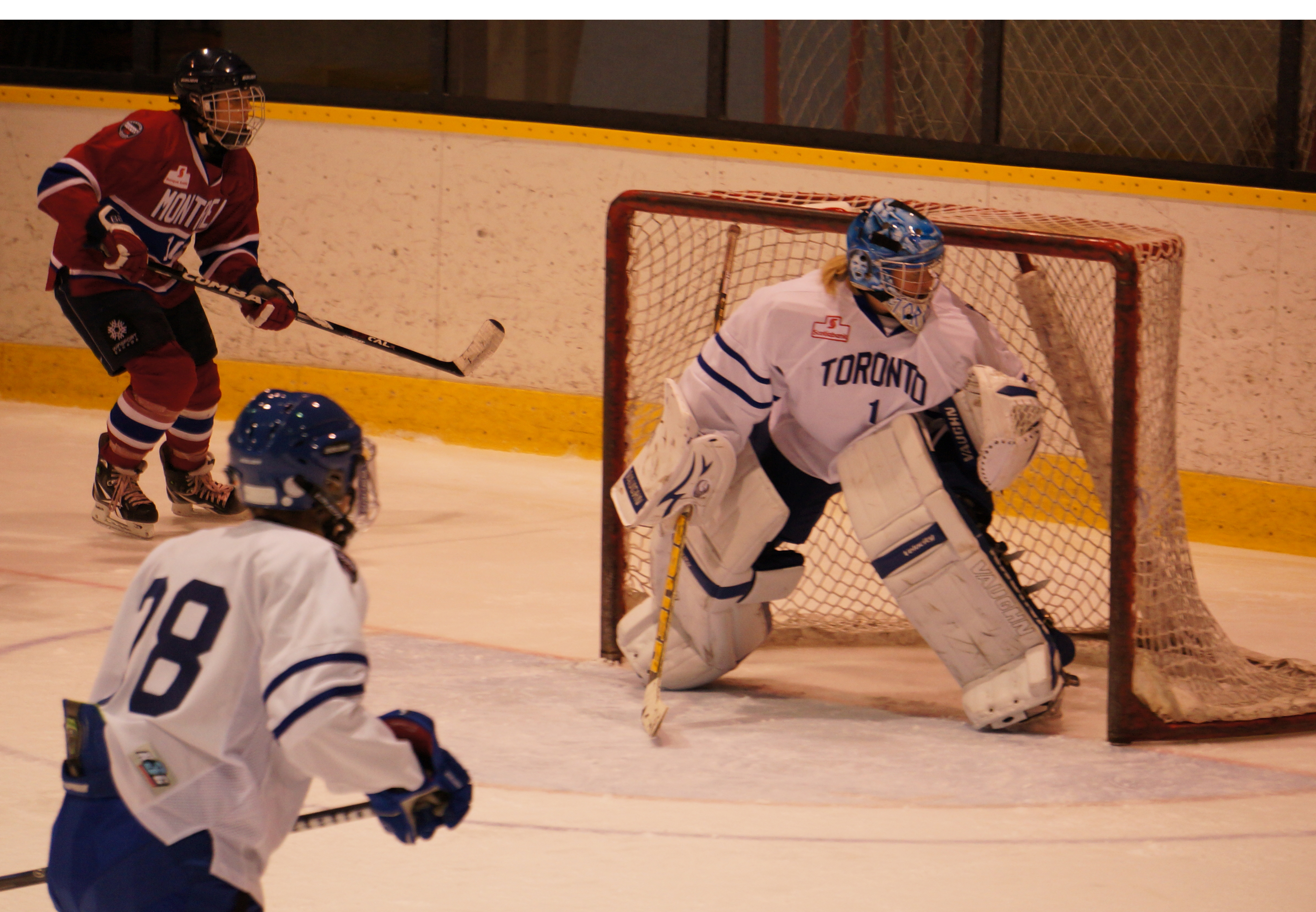

== Draft ==
= Indicates Olympian

= Indicates former NCAA player

= Indicates former CIS player

#	Player	Hometown	College
1	Tessa Bonhomme (D)	(Canada) Sudbury, Ontario	Ohio State Buckeyes (WCHA)
3	Britni Smith (D)	(Canada) Port Perry, Ontario	St. Lawrence Skating Saints (ECAC Hockey)
4	Carly Haggard (F)	(Canada) Port Alberni, British Columbia	Dartmouth Big Green (ECAC Hockey)
9	Kendra Fisher (G)	(Canada) Kincardine, Ontario	Humber Hawks (OCAA)
10	Michelle Bonello (D)	(Canada) Mississauga, Ontario	Mercyhurst Lakers (CHA)
15	Jennifer Brine (F)	(Canada) Truro, Nova Scotia	Harvard Crimson (ECAC Hockey)
16	LaToya Clarke (F)	(Canada) Pickering, Ontario	Minnesota Golden Golphers (WCHA)
21	Rebecca Davies (F)	(Canada) Toronto, Ontario	St. Francis Xavier X-Women (AUS)
22	Frances McPhail (F)	(Canada) Vancouver, British Columbia	Niagara Purple Eagles (CHA)
27	Meagan Aarts (F)	(Canada) Watford, Ontario	Maine Black Bears (HEA)
28	Alexandra Hoffmeyer (D)	(United States) Detroit, Michigan	Mercyhurst Lakers (CHA)
33	Kelly Zamora (F)	(Canada) Oshawa, Ontario	Wayne State Warriors (CHA)
34	Angela Di Stasi (F)	(Canada) Toronto, Ontario	Concordia Stingers (QSSF)
39	Mary Modeste (D)	(Canada) Oshawa, Ontario	Toronto Lady Blues (OUA)
42	Laura Watt (D)	(Canada) Ajax, Ontario	Princeton Tigers (ECAC Hockey)
43	Jessica Clermont (D)	(Canada) Port Elgin, Ontario	Niagara Purple Eagles (CHA)
48	Kristy Zamora (F)	(Canada) Oshawa, Ontario	Brown Bears (ECAC Hockey)
49	Emily Berzins (F)	(Canada) Fort McMurray, Alberta	Wayne State Warriors (CHA)
54	Melissa Boal (F)	(Canada) Pakenham, Ontario	Wayne State Warriors (CHA)

=== Protected players ===
Player	Hometown	College
Jennifer Botterill (F)	(Canada) Winnipeg, Manitoba	Harvard Crimson (ECAC Hockey)
Martine Garland (D)	(Canada) Toronto, Ontario	New Hampshire Wildcats (ECAC East)
Sami Jo Small (G)	(Canada) Winnipeg, Manitoba	Stanford University

== Roster ==
Goalies
Number		Player	Former Team	Hometown
31	(Canada)	Allison Cubberley	Elmira College	Bracebridge, Ontario
30	(Canada)	Kendra Fisher	Humber College	Kincardine, Ontario
1	(Canada)	Sami Jo Small	Canadian National Team	Winnipeg, Manitoba

Defense
Number		Player	Former Team	Hometown
25	(Canada)	Tessa Bonhomme	Canadian National Team	Sudbury, Ontario
19	(Canada)	Britni Smith		Port Perry, Ontario
18	(United States)	Alexandra Hoffmeyer	Maine Black Bears	Detroit, Michigan
12	(Canada)	Martine Garland	University of New Hampshire	Toronto, Ontario
5	(Canada)	Jessica Clermont	Niagara University	Port Elgin, Ontario
4	(Canada)	Michelle Bonello	Mercyhurst College	Mississauga, Ontario
2	(Canada)	Haleigh Callison	University of British Columbia	Smithers, British Columbia

Forwards
Number		Player	Former Team	Hometown
96	(Canada)	Kelly Zamora	Wayne State University	Oshawa, Ontario
67	(Canada)	Rebecca Davies	St. Francis Xavier University	Toronto, Ontario
44	(Canada)	Kori Cheverie	St. Mary's Huskies	Truro, Nova Scotia
27	(Canada)	Kristy Zamora	Brown Bears	Oshawa, Ontario
17	(Canada)	Jennifer Botterill	Canadian National Team	Winnipeg, Manitoba
16	(Canada)	Frances McPhail		Vancouver, British Columbia
15	(Canada)	Angela Di Stasi	Concordia University	Toronto, Ontario
14	(Canada)	LaToya Clarke	University of Minnesota	Pickering, Ontario
11	(Canada)	Melanie Mills		Pusclinsh, Ontario
9	(Canada)	Jennifer Brine	Harvard University	Truro, Nova Scotia
6	(Canada)	Meagan Aarts	Maine University	Wattford, Ontario
	(Canada)	Carly Haggard		Port Alberni, British Columbia

== Coaching staff ==
- General Manager: Barb Fisher
- Head Coach: Dan Lichterman
- Assistant Coach: Joanne Eustace
- Assistant Coach: Bartley Blair
- Equipment Manager: Lester Tiu
- Head Athletic Therapist : Jennifer Bushell
- Assistant Athletic Therapist: Sharon Welsby
- Student Athletic Therapist: Carrie Alderdice

== Regular season ==
=== Final standings ===
Note: GP = Games played, W = Wins, L = Losses, T = Ties, OTL = Overtime losses, GF = Goals for, GA = Goals against, Pts = Points.

February 28, 2011
No.	Team	GP	W	L	OTL	GF	GA	Pts
1	Montreal	26	22	2	2	125	70	46
2	Brampton	26	19	6	1	111	69	39
3	Boston	26	10	15	1	73	101	21
4	Toronto	26	8	13	5	83	98	21
5	Burlington	26	6	18	2	54	108	14

=== Schedule ===
Date	Teams	Score
October 23, 2010	Toronto @ Brampton	Brampton, 7-3
October 24, 2010	Burlington @ Toronto	Toronto, 2-1
October 30, 2010	Toronto @ Montreal	Montreal, 5-3
October 31, 2010	Toronto @ Montreal	Montreal, 5-4
November 21, 2010	Boston @ Toronto	Boston, 4-2
December 5, 2010	Toronto @ Brampton	Brampton,4-2
December 11, 2010	Toronto @ Boston	Boston, 6-4
December 12, 2010	Toronto @ Boston	Boston, 4-3
December 18, 2010	Toronto @ Brampton	Brampton 5-2
January 9, 2011	Boston @ Toronto	Toronto, 9-4
January 15, 2011	Montreal @ Toronto	Toronto 3-2
January 21, 2011	Brampton @ Toronto	Brampton 5-2
January 30, 2011	Burlington @ Toronto	Toronto 1-0
February 5, 2011	Toronto @ Boston	Boston 5-4
February 6, 2011	Toronto @ Boston	Boston 4-2
February 12, 2011	Toronto @ Montreal	Toronto 5-4
February 13, 2011	Toronto @ Montreal	Montreal 3-0
February 19, 2011	Montreal @ Toronto	Montreal 4-2
February 20, 2011	Toronto @ Burlington	Burlington 5-4
February 23, 2011	Burlington @ Toronto	Burlington 5-4

== Postseason ==
March 27 Sunday: The final Game concluded with the Montreal Stars defeating Toronto 5 -0. Montreal got off to a 2 - 0 lead in the first period, The first goal was scored by Noémie Marin on a backhand from her off wing at the 14:47 minute mark, as she converted a pass from Caroline Ouellette. The second goal was scored at the 7:29 minute mark off a face off in the Toronto end. Toronto goalie Sami Jo Small played well in defeat as Montreal controlled the game outshooting Toronto 51 to 26. Toronto did threaten offensively early in the game and could have turned the contest around but Montreal goalie, Kim St-Pierre, came up with exceptional saves to earn the shutout and ultimately crown Montreal Stars as the 2011 Clarkson Cup Champions.

== See also ==
- 2010–11 CWHL season
- 2011 Clarkson Cup
- Toronto Furies
- Toronto Aeros
- Canadian Women's Hockey League
