= Michelle Bonello =

Canadian ice hockey player

- Born: March 10, 1985 (age 41) Mississauga, Ontario, Canada
- Height: 5 ft 4 in (163 cm)
- Weight: 150 lb (68 kg; 10 st 10 lb)
- Position: Defense
- Catches: Left
- CHA CWHL FIRS team: Mercyhurst Lakers; Vaughan Flames (2009–10); Toronto Furies (2010–2019); Canada women's national inline hockey team
- Playing career: 2003–present
Medal record
Inline World Championships
Gold medal – first place	2016 Italy
Silver medal – second place	2014 France
Gold medal – first place	2012 Colombia
Silver medal – second place	2011 Italy
Bronze medal – third place	2009 Italy
Silver medal – second place	2008 Germany
Silver medal – second place	2006 United States

Michelle Bonello (born March 10, 1985) is a women's ice hockey player who has also competed for the Canada women's national inline hockey team, having participated at seven FIRS Inline Hockey World Championships With regards to Bonello's women's ice hockey career, she has competed at the university level with the Mercyhurst Lakers women's ice hockey program in the NCAA. Acquired by the Toronto Furies in the 2010 CWHL Draft, the first in league history, she was on the Clarkson Cup winning team in 2014.

== Playing career ==
=== Ice hockey ===
Bonello joined the Mercyhurst Lakers in 2003. As a freshman, she played in all 36 games. In her freshman year, she had five goals and 12 assists for 17 points. Her four power play goals tied for first on the Lakers. On October 25, 2003, Bonello had her only multiple-goal game came of the season in a contest against St. Lawrence. In the CHA semi-finals, she notched the game-winning goal versus Wayne State. The following season, she played in 37 games and accumulated 17 points while being named to the CHA All-Conference First Team.

A member of the Toronto Furies in their inaugural season, Bonello played in their first two seasons. After being inactive for 2012-13, Bonello returned for the 2013-14 campaign, which culminated with a Clarkson Cup victory. In the autumn of 2014, Bonello was named captain of the Furies. She also holds the rare distinction of having played in both the first and second CWHL All-Star Games. Both games were contested at Toronto's Air Canada Centre.

=== Inline hockey ===
Bonello made her debut for the Canadian national team at the 2006 FIRS Women's World Championships, emerging with a silver medal. Of note, three of her teammates on the roster had also played with her at Mercyhurst; Meghan Agosta, Teresa Marchese and Samantha Shirley.

At the 2009 FIRS Worlds, Bonello enjoyed some stellar performances. Contributing two goals and an assist, Bonello placed her name on the scoresheet during a 13-2 defeat of Australia. Challenging Finland on Canada Day 2009, Bonello contributed a three point performance (one goal, two assists) in a 15-3 triumph.

Bonello was part of the gold medal roster at the 2012 World Championships, hosted in Bucaramanga, Colombia. With the squad enjoying a 6-0 record, former Mercyhurst Lakers teammate Jackie Jarrell, plus Toronto Furies teammate Kendra Fisher, played for the Canadian contingent.

Among the veteran players that helped Canada win the gold medal at the 2016 FIRS Inline Hockey World Championship, Bonello enjoyed her seventh podium finish and the second gold medal in her career. Bonello finished the tournament as one of Canada's five leading scorers. As a side note, Furies teammate Alyssa Baldin was also part of the Canadian gold medal winning roster.

== Career stats ==
=== NCAA ===
Year	Team	GP	G	A	PTS	PPG	SHG	GWG
2003-04	Mercyhurst	36	5	12	17	4	0	2
2004-05	Mercyhurst	37	4	13	17	3	0	0
2005-06	Mercyhurst	35	2	8	10	1	0	0
2006-07	Mercyhurst	35	1	6	7	0	0	0

=== CWHL ===
Year	Team	GP	G	A	PTS	+/-	PIM	PPG	SHG	GWG
2010-11	Toronto	24	6	7	13	+5	52	1	0	1
2011-12	Toronto	20	2	1	3	+3	12	0	0	0
2013-14	Toronto	22	2	10	12	+3	39	2	0	0
2014-15	Toronto	24	0	4	4	-13	38	0	0	0
2015-16	Toronto	24	0	8	8	-11	38	0	0	0

=== FIRS Worlds ===
Year	Event	GP	G	A	PTS	PIM
2016	FIRS Inline Hockey Worlds	7	4	1	5	4

== Awards and honours ==
- CHA All-Rookie Team (2003–04)
- CHA All-Tournament Team (2003–04)
- All-CHA First Team (2004–05)
- All-CHA Second Team (2006–07)
- 2009-10 CWHL First Team All-Star
- 2014 Clarkson Cup

Preceded by Jenelle Kohanchuk (2013-2014)	Captain, Toronto Furies (2014-present)	Succeeded by To Be Determined
