= 2007–08 Mercyhurst Lakers women's ice hockey season =

CHA Regular season co-champions CHA Playoff champions NCAA Women's Ice Hockey championship, Lost Quarterfinals
- Conference: CHA
- Home ice: Mercyhurst Ice Center

Rankings
- USA Today/USA Hockey Magazine: 7
- USCHO.com/CBS College Sports: 7

Record
- Overall: 27-8-3
- Home: 17-2-1
- Road: 10-6-2
- Neutral: 0-0

Coaches and captains
- Head coach: Michael Sisti
- Captain: Stephanie Jones
- Alternate captain(s): Meghan Agosta, Danielle Ayearst, Valerie Chouinard, Natalie Payne

The 2007–08 Mercyhurst Lakers women's ice hockey team represented Mercyhurst College in the 2007–08 NCAA Division I women's ice hockey season. The Lakers were coached by Michael Sisti and had a 9-2-1 conference record. Assisting Sisti was Paul Colontino and Louis Goulet. Mike Folga was the Head Equipment Manager. Mercyhurst featured eight newcomers in 2007-2008 as the Lakers lost 10 players from the 2006–2007, 32-win team. Seven of those players were lost to graduation.

== Exhibition ==
Date	Opponent	Location	Score
9/28/2007	Vaughan Flames	Erie, Pa.	W 3-1

== Recruiting ==
- December 21, 2007: Forwards Bailey Bram, Kelley Steadman, and Jessica Jones have committed next season to play for the Lakers. In addition, defender Pam Zgoda and goaltender Hillary Pattenden have also committed to the program. Forward Lauren Ragen, a transfer from Brown University, will be eligible to play next season.

== Regular season ==
- October 12: Valerie Chouinard registered a hat trick against Boston University
- October 27: Stephanie Jones had a 4-assist game vs. the Colgate Raiders women's ice hockey program
- January 26: Valerie Chouinard had 4 assists Quinnipiac
- During the 2007–08 season, Meghan Agosta tied Krissy Wendell’s record for most shorthanded goals in one season with 7.

=== Players ===
- Senior Danielle Ayearst was an assistant captain. Her Mercyhurst career included 146 games played (8 goals and 41 assists).
- Offensively, Valerie Chouinard was second on the team in goals (16) and points (50), while ranking first in assists (34). Chouinard tied for first in power play goals with 10. She tied for second on the club with 3 game-winning goals. Chouinard would end the season

ended 3rd year with team as all-time leader in points (155, since broken) and power play goals (34).

- Laura Hosier had 21 wins, compared to seven losses and three ties. She finished her Mercyhurst career as the program's all-time leader in games played (105), wins (74), and saves (1925), while finishing second in career shutouts with 24. Nationally, Hosier ranked seventh in winning percentage (.726), while placing 13th in goals-against average (2.17).
- Stephanie Jones was the team captain in her senior year. She finished her career with 54 goals and 75 assists in 138 games played. In addition, she ranked 5th in career points, tied for 5th in goals, 4th in assists and tied for 4th in game-winning goals. In addition, to playing for Mercyhurst, she played for Team Canada at European Air Canada Cup in January. Offensively, she accumulated 15 goals and 23 assists. Her 15 goals were third on the Lakers, and her 38 points were fourth. In the CHA, her 15 conference points tied for 7th overall. Jones finished her Mercyhurst playing career with 54 goals and 75 assists in 138 games played.
- Meghan Agosta had five-point games against Quinnipiac and Colgate and four-goal games against Brown and Colgate. In addition, she had a dozen multiple-goal games and 18 multiple-point games. At the conclusion of her second season at Mercyhurst, Agosta ranked first all-time in goals (78), shorthanded goals (13), and game-winning goals (20). She would end her sophomore second in points (139) and power play goals (26).

=== Roster ===
Number	Name	Height	Position	Shoots	Class
1	Nicole Nelson	5-8	G	L	Sr.
2	Kristen Erickson	5-4	F	L	SR
5	Danielle Ayearst	5-5	D	L	SR
6	Johanna Malmstrom	5-8	D	L	SO
7	Natalie Payne	5-2	D	L	JR
8	Melissa Lacroix	5-9	D	R	FR
9	Jackie Jarrell	5-5	F	L	SR
10	Cheyenne Bojeski	5-6	F	L	FR
11	Vicki Bendus	5-1	F	R	FR
16	Hayley McMeekin	5-5	F	L	JR
18	Valerie Chouinard	5-5	F	R	JR
20	Sherilyn Fraser	5-5	F	L	SR
21	Ashley Cockell	5-8	F	R	FR
23	Jesse Scanzano	6-0	F	R	FR
26	Geena Prough	5-2	F/D	R	FR
27	Stephanie Jones	5-4	F	R	SR
28	Cassea Schols	5-9	D	R	FR
29	Laura Hosier	5-7	G	L	SR
35	Courtney Drennen	5-7	G	L	JR
87	Meghan Agosta	5-6	F	L	SO

=== Schedule ===
Date	Opponent	Location	Score
10/2/2007	Robert Morris	Moon Township, Pa.	3-0
10/5/2007	MAINE	Erie, Pa.	4-0
10/6/2007	MAINE	Erie, Pa.	5-0
10/12/2007	Boston University	Erie, Pa.	6-5
10/13/2007	Boston University	Erie, Pa.	4-1
10/20/2007	Minnesota-Duluth	Duluth, Minn.	1-1 (OT)
10/21/2007	Minnesota-Duluth	Duluth, Minn.	1-3
10/26/2007	COLGATE	Erie, Pa.	5-1
10/27/2007	COLGATE	Erie, Pa.	6-4
10/30/2007	Robert Morris	Erie, Pa.	6-1
11/16/2007	CLARKSON	Potsdam, N.Y.	2-2 (OT)
11/17/2007	CLARKSON	Potsdam, N.Y.	2-3
11/23/2007	PRINCETON	Princeton, N.J.	3-1
11/24/2007	PRINCETON	Princeton, N.J.	1-0
12/1/2007	NIAGARA	Niagara University, N.Y.	6-1
12/2/2007	NIAGARA	Niagara University, N.Y.	5-0
12/7/2007	New Hampshire	Erie, Pa.	4-3
12/8/2007	New Hampshire	Erie, Pa.	2-5
12/15/2007	DARTMOUTH	Hanover, N.H.	7-0
12/16/2007	DARTMOUTH	Hanover, N.H.	4-6
1/12/2008	PROVIDENCE	Providence, R.I.	3-7
1/13/2008	PROVIDENCE	Providence, R.I.	3-0
1/18/2008	YALE	Erie, Pa.	5-3
1/19/2008	BROWN	Erie, Pa.	4-2
1/25/2008	QUINNIPIAC	Erie, Pa.	7-1
1/26/2008	QUINNIPIAC	Erie, Pa.	7-0
2/8/2008	WAYNE STATE	Erie, Pa.	4-5 (OT)
2/9/2008	WAYNE STATE	Erie, Pa.	2-2 (OT)
2/15/2008	NIAGARA	Erie, Pa.	5-2
2/16/2008	NIAGARA	Erie, Pa.	5-1
2/22/2008	WAYNE STATE	Detroit, Mich.	4-1
2/23/2008	WAYNE STATE	Detroit, Mich.	2-3 (OT)
2/29/2008	Robert Morris	Erie, Pa.	5-2
3/1/2008	Robert Morris	Moon Township, Pa.	5-4 (OT)
3/7/2008	NIAGARA	Niagara University, N.Y.	4-2
3/8/2008	WAYNE STATE	Niagara University, N.Y.	2-1 (OT)
3/15/2008	Minnesota-Duluth	Duluth, Minn.	4-5

== Player stats ==
=== Skaters ===
Player	Games Played	Goals	Assists	Points	Shots	+/-	PIM
Meghan Agosta	33	40	25	65	284	+29	26
Valerie Chouinard	37	16	34	50	221	+19	10
Jesse Scanzano	37	13	27	40	106	+17	66
Stephanie Jones	37	15	23	38	111	+24	20
Vicki Bendus	37	11	21	32	136	+15	26
Natalie Payne	37	5	23	28	55	+23	44
Geena Prough	37	9	12	21	81	+13	24
Cassea Schols	37	5	12	17	61	+19	38
Hayley McMeekin	19	9	6	15	46	+8	12
Ashley Cockell	37	6	9	15	85	+15	63
Kristen Erickson	36	5	6	11	48	+7	58
Sherilyn Fraser	33	4	7	11	35	+12	18
Danielle Ayearst	35	2	8	10	58	+13	36
Melissa Dianoski	24	2	6	8	59	+5	18
Melissa Lacroix	37	2	4	6	46	+31	38
Jackie Jarrell	22	3	1	4	21	-1	4
Johanna Malmstrom	37	0	3	3	12	+13	26
Cheyenne Bojeski	33	1	1	2	6	+1	2
Laura Hosier	33	0	1	1	0	+1	2

=== Goaltenders ===
Player	Games Played	Minutes	Goals Against	Wins	Losses	Ties	Shutouts	Save %	Goals Against Average
Courtney Drennen	6	295:21	7	5	1	0	2	.929	1.42
Laura Hosier	33	1921:08	69	21	7	3	6	.910	2.15
Nicole Nelson	1	40:00	1	0	0	0	0	.889	1.50

== Postseason ==
=== CHA Tournament ===
- After tying with Wayne State for the regular season title, the Lakers won their 6th straight College Hockey America Playoff with a 2–1 overtime win over Wayne State on March 8 at Niagara University. Stephanie Jones would score the game-winning goal.

=== NCAA Hockey tournament ===
- On Saturday, March 15, the Lakers season ended with a 5–4 loss at Minnesota Duluth in the NCAA Quarterfinals.

== Awards and honors ==
- Meghan Agosta, RBK Hockey/AHCA First Team All-American
- Meghan Agosta, Patty Kazmaier Memorial Award Top Three Finalist
- Meghan Agosta, CHA Player of the Year
- Meghan Agosta, All-CHA First Team
- Meghan Agosta, 2008 CHA All-Tournament Team
- Meghan Agosta, 2008 CHA Tournament MVP
- Meghan Agosta was a member of Team Canada at 2008 European Air Canada Cup where she made All-Tournament Team. In addition, she was chosen to play for Team Canada at Women's World Championship In China in April 2008.
- Meghan Agosta set a Mercyhurst record with a 20-game scoring streak. She set a one-game record with 17 shots on goal against Brown. In addition, she had a single-season record in shorthanded goals with seven.
- Danielle Ayearst, CHA Defensive Player of the Week, (Week of November 26)
- Danielle Ayearst CHA All-Academic Team
- Vicki Bendus, 2008 CHA Rookie of the Year
- Vicki Bendus, 2008 CHA All-Rookie Team
- Valerie Chouinard, Patty Kazmaier Award nominee
- Valerie Chouinard, CHA Offensive POTW October 15
- Valerie Chouinard, CHA All-Academic Team
- Valerie Chouinard, Second Team All-Conference
- Laura Hosier, first in CHA in goals-against-average (1.88)
- Laura Hosier, CHA All-Tournament Team
- Laura Hosier, CHA All-Academic Team
- Laura Hosier, Frozen Four Skills Challenge participant
- Stephanie Jones, CHA All-Tournament Team
- Stephanie Jones, CHA Student Athlete of the Year
- Stephanie Jones, Bill Smith Award (an in-house honor for meritorious service on-and-off-the ice)
- Johanna Malmstrom, CHA All-Academic Team
- Jesse Scanzano, 2008 CHA All-Rookie Team

== International ==
Valerie Chouinard played for Team Canada at European Air Canada Cup in January 2008 and was selected as an alternate for Team Canada at the 2008 Women's World Ice Hockey Championships in China in April.

- Meghan Agosta, Laura Hosier, and Stephanie Jones, were all members of Canada's Under-22 Team at the 2008 European Air Canada Cup.
