= Amanda Benoit-Wark =

Canadian ice hockey player

- Born: January 22, 1976 (age 50) Welland, Ontario, Canada
- Height: 5 ft 2 in (157 cm)
- Weight: 135 lb (61 kg; 9 st 9 lb)
- Position: Centre
- NWHL team: Beatrice Aeros
- National team: Canada
- Playing career: 1997–2004
Medal record
Representing Canada
Women's ice hockey
IIHF World Women's Championships
Gold medal – first place	1999 Finland	Tournament
Gold medal – first place	2000 Canada	Tournament
Women's inline hockey
FIRS World Championship
Gold medal – first place	2004 Canada

Amanda Benoit-Wark (born January 22, 1976) is a Canadian ice hockey player. Benoit-Wark played for the Canada women's national ice hockey team from 1996 to 2004. Benoit is a two-time World Champion playing in both 1999 and 2000 World Championships.

== Playing career ==
During the 1980s, she played organized hockey in Welland, Ontario and with the Stoney Creek Minor Hockey Association, capturing MVP honours at Stoney Creek in 1988.

In 1993, she was selected to play with Team Ontario Red at the 1993 Canadian national women's under-18 championship. Not only would she emerge with the gold medal, but she was recognized as the tournament's Most Valuable Player.

With the Beatrice Aeros of the former Central Ontario Women's Hockey League (COWHL), Benoit-Wark appeared at the Esso Women's National Championships on seven occasions. She would enjoy six podium finished, including the gold medal in 2000 and 2004, along with three silver medals (1996, 1998, 2002) and one bronze (1999). Complementing this stellar run was tournament MVP honours in 1998.

=== Hockey Canada ===
Benoit-Wark's first appearance with the Canadian National Women's Team was at the 1996 4 Nations Cup. Hosted in Ottawa, Ontario (the host city for the inaugural IIHF Women's World Championships), she would win gold with Team Canada. Two years later, she would appear once again in the 4 Nations Cup (contested in Kuortane, Finland), capturing another gold medal. In 1999, Benoit-Wark would make her first appearance at the IIHF Women's World Championships, helping Canada to a gold medal, avenging their loss to the United States at the 1998 Nagano Winter Games. Benoit would capture another gold medal at the IIHF Women's Worlds in 2000, as the event was contested on Canadian ice in Mississauga, Ontario. Later that year, Benoit-Wark would play in her third 4 Nations Cup (played in Provo, Utah), obtaining another gold medal. Attending Canada's centralization training camp in advance of the 2002 Salt Lake Winter Games, she was released from the roster on December 15, 2001 with Gillian Apps. Benoit was asked to stay and train with the team, and was later added as an alternate player.

=== Other ===
Also a member of the Canada women's national inline hockey team, winning a gold medal at the 2004 FIRS Inline Hockey World Championships in London, Ontario.

== Coaching career ==
Benoit-Wark was named an assistant coach of Canada's National Women's Development Team for the 2016-17 season.

She has served as the head coach of the girls' hockey team at Ridley College since 2008. She would capture a gold medal as a member of the coaching staff for Canada's National Women's Development Team at the 2015 Nations Cup. In 2012 and 2013, Wark served as one of the camp coaches with Canada's National Women's Development Team in 2012 and 2013.

== Awards and honours ==
- 1993, Most Valuable Player, Canadian women's U18 championship
- 1997-98, COWHL Most Valuable Player
- Best Forward, 1998 Esso National championships
