= Andria Hunter =

Canadian ice hockey player (born 1967)

- Born: December 22, 1967 (age 58) Peterborough, Ontario, Canada
- Height: 5 ft 6 in (168 cm)
- Weight: 137 lb (62 kg; 9 st 11 lb)
- Position: Forward
- Shot: Left
- Played for: ECAC; New Hampshire Wildcats; CIS; Toronto Varsity Blues; COWHL; Scarborough Firefighters; Toronto Red Wings; Newtonbrook Panthers; Mississauga Chiefs; NWHL; Mississauga; LKA; DHC Langenthal
- National team: Canada
- Playing career: 1986–2007
- Website: whockey.com
Medal record
Representing Canada
Women's ice hockey
IIHF World Championship
Gold medal – first place	1992 Finland
Gold medal – first place	1994 United States
Women's inline hockey
FIRS World Championship
Gold medal – first place	2002 United States

Andria Hunter (born December 22, 1967) is a Canadian retired ice hockey player and former member of the Canadian women's national ice hockey team and national inline hockey team. In 1994, she created the website whockey.com, one of the earliest sites dedicated to women's ice hockey on the web, which remains one of the few digital records of women's ice hockey during the 1990s and early 2000s.

== Playing career ==
=== Early years ===
As a student at Thomas A. Stewart Secondary School in her hometown of Peterborough, Ontario, Hunter was a standout athlete and scholar. She received the school's Junior Athlete Award in 1983 and the Senior Athlete Award in 1985. In grade thirteen, she played on seven different school teams – cross country, field hockey, badminton, ice hockey, volleyball, track, and soccer – in addition to playing ice hockey with Tri Counties Hockey (presently run as Keene Wolverines) senior women's team. She graduated in 1986 as the class valedictorian and was the recipient of the 1996 Graduating Athlete Award.

=== University ===
In her final year of secondary school, Hunter received an offer for and accepted a full-tuition athletic scholarship to the University of New Hampshire (UNH). As a member of the New Hampshire Wildcats women's ice hockey program, she was the team point leader in three of her four seasons and served as captain in her senior year. The Wildcats claimed the ECAC Championship twice during Hunter's tenure, first in 1987 and under her captaincy in 1990, and placed second in the conference in the other two years.

After graduating from UNH in 1990, Hunter opted to pursue a Master of Science degree at the University of Toronto and joined the Toronto Varsity Blues women's ice hockey program, playing 5 years (1990–92,1993–96). During that time, the Varsity Blues won four Ontario Women's Intercollegiate Athletics Association Ice Hockey Championships, Hunter was named to the First Team All-Star every year, and she recorded 123 points in 55 games. At the time of her retirement, Hunter topped the Ontario league's career scoring list.

=== National Women's Hockey League ===
Hunter played a total of 10 seasons in the Central Ontario Women's Hockey League and the National Women's Hockey League (1999–2007):

- 3 seasons with the Scarborough Firefighters (1990–91, 1991–92, 1993-94)
- 1 season with the Toronto Red Wings (1995-96)
- 1 season with the Newtonbrook Panthers (1996-97
- 3 seasons with the Mississauga Chiefs (1997-98), 1998–99, 1999-2000)
- 2 seasons with the Mississauga Ice Bears (2000–01, 2001-02)

Hunter finished 3rd overall in league scoring in her tenth and final year (17 goals, 21 assists, 38 points)

=== Swiss Women's Hockey League A ===
During the 1992–93 season, Hunter competed for DHC Langenthal in the Swiss Leistungsklasse A (LKA). With DHC Langenthal, Hunter led the league in scoring, netting 59 goals and tallying 28 assists in 20 games.

=== International play ===
At the 1992 IIHF Women's World Championship in Tampere, Finland, Hunter played on a line with Angela James and Margot Page. She was the third-highest overall scorer in the tournament, collecting five goals and four assists across five games.

She was also part of Team Canada's gold winning entry at the 1994 IIHF Women's World Championship.

== Other ==
Hunter was also an accomplished ball hockey player. Hunter competed with the Toronto Dragons that won the ball hockey National Championships in 1991, and placed second in 1992 and 1994. Hunter was also a member of the Canada women's national inline hockey team, winning a gold medal at the 2002 FIRS Inline Hockey World Championships.

== Personal life ==
Hunter holds a BSc in computer science from the University of New Hampshire and a MSc in computer science from the University of Toronto.

== Career statistics ==
=== University of New Hampshire ===
University of New Hampshire
Year	Games played	Goals	Assists	Points
1986-87		20	19	39
1987-88		20	17	37
1988-89		28	20	48
1989-90		23	23	46
Career	90	91	79	170

=== National Women's Hockey League ===
NWHL - Regular Season
Year	Team	Games played	Goals	Assists	Points	PIM
1993-94	Scarborough Firefighters	24	13	19	32	4
1995-96	Toronto Red Wings	10	1	6	7	2
1996-97	Newtonbrook Panthers	6	6	9	15	0
1997-98	Mississauga Chiefs	17	7	7	14	0
1998-99	Mississauga Chiefs	40	20	21	41	2
1999-2000	Mississauga Chiefs	37	20	29	49	0
2000-01	Mississauga Ice Bears	39	18	27	45	0
2001-02	Mississauga Ice Bears	30	17	21	38	8

=== Hockey Canada ===
Tournament	Games Played	Goals	Assists	Points	PIM	+/-
1992 WWC	5	5	4	9	0	+6
1994 WWC	4	0	2	2	0	

== Awards and honours ==
- 2002 Isobel Gathorne-Hardy Award, Hockey Canada
- All-Star First Team, Ontario University Athletics women's ice hockey
  - 1995–96
  - 1994–95
  - 1993–94
  - 1991–92
  - 1990–91
- 1993–94 Toronto Blues Most Sportsmanlike Player, University of Toronto
- T-Holders Academic Excellence Award, University of Toronto
  - 1991–92
  - 1993–94
