= 2006–07 Mercyhurst Lakers women's ice hockey season =

CHA Regular season champions CHA Playoff champions NCAA Women's Ice Hockey championship, Lost Quarterfinals
- Conference: CHA

Rankings
- USA Today/USA Hockey Magazine: TBD
- USCHO.com/CBS College Sports: TBD

Record
- Overall: 33-2-3
- Home: 19-1-2
- Road: 14-1-1
- Neutral: 0-0

Coaches and captains
- Head coach: Michael Sisti

The 2006–07 Mercyhurst Lakers women's ice hockey team represented Mercyhurst College in the 2006–07 NCAA Division I women's ice hockey season. The Lakers were coached by Michael Sisti and went 11-0-1 in their conference. Mercyhurst had the second-best scoring defense in Division I in 2006-2007. It would be the rookie season of Meghan Agosta. She was the first freshman ever to be in the Final 3 for the Patty Kazmaier Award. No other freshman had made it that far in voting.

== Regular season ==
The Lakers made local, regional and national headlines (features in the USA Today and New York Times). In late November, the Lakers were ranked #1 and stayed there for 11 consecutive weeks. In addition, the Lakers accumulated a 24-game unbeaten streak to finish the season (twenty two wins and two losses).

=== Highlights ===
- October 1: In a game against the Maine Black Bears women's ice hockey program, Valerie Chouinard accumulated five points. In that same game, Julia Colizza accumulated four points.
- October 13: Laura Hosier got her first career assist in 5-2 win over the Clarkson Golden Knights women's ice hockey program
- October 21: Against the Dartmouth Big Green women's ice hockey program, Stephanie Bourbeau scored a hat trick.
- October 28: Against the Providence Friars women's ice hockey program, Jill Nugent scored her only goal of the season. The Lakers prevailed 4-3. Danielle Ayearst scored the unassisted game-winning goal.
- November 17: Laura Hosier had a season best 31 saves in 4-2 victory over the St. Lawrence Skating Saints women's ice hockey program
- January 12: Valerie Chouinard registered a hat trick against CHA rival Wayne State. In that same game, Julia Colizza registered four points versus Wayne State.
- February 3: Against CHA rival Niagara, Valerie Chouinard had a five-point game
- February 9: In a game against CHA opponent Robert Morris, Stephanie Jones had a multiple-goal game

=== Players ===
- Stephanie Bourbeau appeared in all 37 games. Statistically, Bourbeau’s 5 game-winning goals were tied for 13th nationally. Her 8 power play goals were tied for 17th. Bourbeau finished the season tied for first all-time in Lakers career points with 130 and finished first in career goals with 67 (both marks since broken). In the CHA, she tied for first in shorthanded goals, and tied for 2nd in game-winning goals. In addition, she was 3d in the CHA in points, tied for 3rd in power play goals, 4th in assists, and tied for 4th in goals.
- Laura Hosier appeared in 32 games and managed seven shutouts. Hosier’s 27 wins set a new one-season mark for her career. Nationally, Laura Hosier ranked 2nd in winning percentage (.903), 4th in goals-against-average (1.52), and 10th in save percentage (.921). After losing to the St. Lawrence Saints on November 18, Hosier went 17-1-2 the rest of the season. Her conference record was 8-0-1.
- Jackie Jarrell rejoined the team after a year and-a-half absence due to injury. She played in 31 games, and other than goaltender Laura Hosier, had fewest penalties on team (2 for 4).
- Stephanie Jones played in 35 games and tied for 20th nationally by scoring four game-winning goals. In the CHA, she ranked 8th in points, while tying for fourth in goals, and tying for ninth in assists.

=== Roster ===
Number	Name	Height	Position	Shoots	Class
1	Nicole Nelson	5-8	G	L	Jr.
2	Kristen Erickson	5-4	F	L	JR
5	Danielle Ayearst	5-5	D	L	JR
6	Johanna Malmstrom	5-8	D	L	Fr
7	Natalie Payne	5-2	D	L	So
9	Jackie Jarrell	5-5	F	L	JR
16	Hayley McMeekin	5-5	F	L	So
18	Valerie Chouinard	5-5	F	R	So
20	Sherilyn Fraser	5-5	F	L	JR
27	Stephanie Jones	5-4	F	R	Jr
29	Laura Hosier	5-7	G	L	JR
35	Courtney Drennen	5-7	G	L	So
87	Meghan Agosta	5-6	F	L	Fr

=== Schedule ===
Date	Opponent	Location	Score
9/30/2006	Maine	Orono, Maine	5-2
10/1/2006	Maine	Orono, Maine	8-1
10/13/2006	CLARKSON	Erie, Pa.	5-2
10/14/2006	CLARKSON	Erie, Pa.	3-3 (OT)
10/21/2006	DARTMOUTH	Erie, Pa.	5-3
10/22/2006	DARTMOUTH	Erie, Pa.	1-0
10/28/2006	PROVIDENCE	Erie, Pa.	4-3
10/29/2006	PROVIDENCE	Erie, Pa.	3-0
11/3/2006	COLGATE	Hamilton, N.Y.	4-2
11/4/2006	COLGATE	Hamilton, N.Y.	3-1
11/17/2006	St. Lawrence	Canton, N.Y.	4-2
11/18/2006	St. Lawrence	Canton, N.Y.	2-3
11/24/2006	Boston College	Durham, N.H.	4-0
11/25/2006	New Hampshire	Durham, N.H.	2-1
12/1/2006	PRINCETON	Erie, Pa.	6-1
12/2/2006	PRINCETON	Erie, Pa.	1-0 (OT)
12/9/2006	Robert Morris	Moon Township, Pa.	3-0
12/10/2006	Robert Morris	Moon Township, Pa.	5-0
1/5/2007	CORNELL	Erie, Pa.	2-1
1/6/2007	CORNELL	Erie, Pa.	6-2
1/12/2007	WAYNE STATE	Detroit, Mich.	8-0
1/13/2007	WAYNE STATE	Detroit, Mich.	7-5
1/19/2007	Connecticut	Erie, Pa.	3-3
1/20/2007	Connecticut	Erie, Pa.	5-0
1/26/2007	YALE	New Haven, Conn.	5-4
1/27/2007	QUINNIPIAC	Hamden, Conn.	3-0
2/2/2007	NIAGARA	Erie, Pa.	3-1
2/3/2007	NIAGARA	Erie, Pa.	7-2
2/9/2007	Robert Morris	Erie, Pa.	7-0
2/10/2007	Robert Morris	Erie, Pa.	6-0
2/16/2007	WAYNE STATE	Erie, Pa.	3-1
2/17/2007	WAYNE STATE	Erie, Pa.	4-2
2/23/2007	NIAGARA	Niagara University, N.Y.	2-1
2/24/2007	NIAGARA	Niagara University, N.Y.	3-3 (OT)
3/2/2007	Robert Morris	Moon Township, Pa.	5-2
3/3/2007	WAYNE STATE	Moon Township, Pa.	4-1
3/9/2007	Minnesota-Duluth	Erie, Pa.	2-3 (OT)

== Player stats ==
Player	GP	Goals	Assists	Points	Shots	+/-	PIM
Meghan Agosta	35	38	36	74	260	35	26
Valerie Chouinard	35	28	26	54	208	31	24
Julia Colizza	37	13	35	48	123	24	44
Stefanie Bourbeau	37	20	25	45	139	30	60
Stephanie Jones	35	16	19	35	106	19	32
Natalie Payne	37	4	23	27	73	21	38
Ashley Pendleton	37	6	16	22	119	23	66
Angelica Lorsell	37	7	12	19	53	8	34
Melissa Dianoski	18					10	16
Danielle Ayearst	37					20	44
Jackie Jarrell	32	3	6	9		5	4
Jill Nugent	37					26	46
Kristen Erickson	36					7	22
Michelle Bonello	35					25	26
Lesley McArthur	36					3	8
Sherilyn Fraser	35					3	42
Alexandra Hoffmeyer	27					1	16
Laura Mosier	32					0	4
Katarina Soikkanen	28						
Sarah Kurth	24						
Johanna Malmstrom	28	0	0	0	7	5	10

=== Goaltenders ===
Player	Games Played	Minutes	Goals Against	Wins	Losses	Ties	Shutouts	Save %	Goals Against Average
Courtney Drennen	7	267:09	8	5	0	1	2	.892	1.31
Laura Mosier	32	1856:51	47	27	2	2	7	.921	1.52
Nicole Nelson	1	20:00	0	0	0	0	0	1.000	0.00

== Notable players ==
- In addition to playing for the Lakers, Meghan Agosta was a member of Canada’s Under-22 Team at the 2007 European Air Canada Cup. She was also selected to play for Team Canada at Women’s World Championship in Winnipeg, Alberta. She had a four-goal and five-point game (season bests) against Yale on January 26, and scored a hat trick against Connecticut on January 20. She had at least one point in 31 of 35 games played and had 23 multiple point games and nine multiple-goal games. In addition, she set team one-season marks for goals (38), points (74), game-winning goals (11), and shorthanded goals (6). She was first nationally in goals-per-game (1.09), game-winning goals (11), and points-per-game by a rookie (2.11)
- Valerie Chouinard ranked first nationally in power play goals with 17. For the season, Chouinard played in 35 games and ranked second on the team in goals, third in assists, and second in points. With her 17 power play goals, she moved into first place on Mercyhurst’s all-timelist with 24. She had at least one point in 26 games, highlighted by a seven-game point scoring streak. In the CHA, Chouinard ranked second in points, and goals.
- Julia Colizza finished her Lakers career by never missing a game in her career. In addition, she was the team captain. She finished her career third all-time at Mercyhurst in points (126) and second all-time in assists (79). In her final season, she tied for first in the CHA in assists, 4th in points (tied), and 5th in power play goals (tied).
- Ashley Pendleton played in all 37 games during the season. In addition, she never missed a contest in her career. As one of the seniors on the team, she finished with 147 games played (25 goals, 53 assists, 78 points). In team scoring, she ranked second among defenders (she led defenders in goals)

== Postseason ==
Mercyhurst hosted its first-ever Division I NCAA playoff game on March 9, 2007, and, for the third straight year, lost in the quarterfinals, this time to Minnesota Duluth 3-2 in overtime. Once again, the Lakers never trailed until the final horn.

== International ==
The following players represented their country in international tournaments.

- Valerie Chouinard, Laura Hosier, and Stephanie Jones were members of Canada's Under-22 Team at the 2007 European Air Canada Cup

== Awards and honors ==
- Meghan Agosta was a Three-time CHA Offensive Player of the Week and seven-time Rookie of the Week. She set Mercyhurst records with a 13-game goal-scoring streak and 16-game point-scoring streak.
- Meghan Agosta, led CHA in points
- Meghan Agosta, led CHA in goals, and power play goals
- Meghan Agosta, Merchyhurst single season record, goals (38), game-winning goals (11), and shorthanded goals (6).
- Meghan Agosta, Merchyhurst single season record, points (74)
- Meghan Agosta, RBK Hockey/AHCA First Team All-American
- Meghan Agosta, Patty Kazmaier Memorial Award Top Three Finalist
- Meghan Agosta, CHA Player of the Year
- Meghan Agosta, CHA Three Star Player of the Year
- Meghan Agosta, All-CHA First Team
- Meghan Agosta, 2007 CHA Tournament MVP
- Meghan Agosta, USCHO First Team
- Meghan Agosta, USCHO All-Rookie Team
- Meghan Agosta, USCHO Rookie of the Year
- Meghan Agosta, 2007 CHA Rookie of the Year
- Meghan Agosta, 2007 CHA All-Rookie Team
- Danielle Ayearst, CHA All-Academic Team
- Stephanie Bourbeau: CHA Offensive Player of the Week (Week of October 23)
- Stephanie Bourbeau, CHA All-Academic Team
- Stephanie Bourbeau, Frozen Four Skills Challenge alternate
- Valerie Chouinard, All-USCHO Second Team
- Valerie Chouinard, CHA First Team
- Valerie Chouinard, CHA All-Tournament Team
- Valerie Chouinard, CHA All-Academic Team
- Valerie Chouinard, USCHO.com Offensive Player of the Week (Week of October 3)
- Julia Colizza Named Mercyhurst College Senior Female Athlete of the Year
- Julia Colizza Second Team All-Conference
- Julia Colizza Frozen Four Skills Challenge selection
- Julia Colizza CHA All-Academic Team
- Julia Colizza Co-CHA Student Athlete of the Year.
- Julia Colizza won 2007 Bill Smith Award
- Laura Hosier, USCHO.com Defensive Player of the Week (Week of October 24)
- Laura Hosier, All-USCHO First Team
- Laura Hosier, Patty Kazmaier Award nominee
- Laura Hosier, led the CHA in goals-against-average, save percentage, and winning percentage
- Laura Hosier, CHA All-Academic Team
- Stephanie Jones, CHA All Academic Team
- Jill Nugent, CHA All-Academic Team
- Ashley Pendleton: 2007 First Team All-CHA
- Michael Sisti, USCHO.com Coach of the Year
