= Italy women's national ball hockey team =

Italy
- Nickname: Italia
- Association: Italian National Ball Hockey Federation
- General manager: Flora Pannunzio (2017)
- Head coach: Rick DiBiase (2017)
- Captain: Christina D'Ambrogio (2017)

First international
- United States (United States) 3–2 Italy (St. John's, Canada • 4 June 2013)

Biggest win
- Italy 6–2 Switzerland (Zug, Switzerland • 23 June 2015)

Biggest defeat
- Czech Republic (Czech Republic) 11–0 Italy (St. John's, Canada • 7 June 2013)

World Championship
- Appearances: 3 (first in 2013)
- Best result: 5th (2017)

The Italy women's national ball hockey team represents Italy in international ball hockey competition. The team is organized by the Italian National Ball Hockey Federation (INBHF; Federazione Italiana di Ball Hockey) – a member of the International Street and Ball Hockey Federation (ISBHF) – and participates in the Ball Hockey World Championship. Italy most recently fielded a women's national ball hockey team for the 2017 World Championship.

== History ==
Italy made its debut at the 2013 World Championship, hosted in St. John's, Newfoundland and Labrador, Canada. Diana Brown was the head coach for Italy's inaugural entry in the ball hockey worlds, with Michel Bodaly served as an assistant coach. Serving as team captain at the 2013 Worlds was Flora Fioccola (Pannunzio), who served as Italy's general manager at the 2017 Worlds. As a side note, Brown would serve as the head coach for Team Canada in a gold medal effort at the 2015 ISBHF Women's Worlds, also winning a Canadian ball hockey national championship with the Toronto Shamrocks in the same calendar year.

Italy's inaugural game was played against the United States on 4 June 2013 and resulted in a 3–2 loss. Danielle Orgera was Italy's starting goaltender and Annalisa Mazzarello scored the team's first international goal at 10:52 in the first period, assisted by Analisa Romano and Christina Cappnecchia.

The team earned their first international victory a day later, on 5 June 2013, in a 2–1 game against Switzerland. Goalkeeper Trina Pirone put on a masterclass in net, turning away 37 of 38 shots against. Elisabetta Carnavale opened scoring on a power play goal assisted by Lianne Foti, and Christina Carney (Lee) secured the win with a third period goal assisted by Jen Mormile. Carney and Mormile were Italy's leading scorers in the round-robin stage.

Goalie Danielle Orgera recorded Italy's first international shutout during the playoff round of the 2013 Worlds, blanking Great Britain in a 6–0 final. Orgera finished the tournament with 3.23 goals against average.

Italy concluded the 2013 World Championship in sixth place, with a 2–4 win–loss record.

At the 2015 World Championship, Italy earned its second sixth-place finish. Nicole Corriero was Italy's leading scorer and ranked tenth overall in tournament scoring, with four goals and eight points. Goalkeeper Trina Pirone faced the greatest number of shots on goal and recorded the most saves of all goalies in the tournament, with 103 saves on 118 shots on goal. The tournament leader in penalty minutes was Italy's Kori Cheverie, who amassed 34 penalty minutes across seven games. As a side note, Cheverie was one of two Canadian Women's Hockey League (CWHL) ice hockey players to suit up for Team Italia in 2015, the other being Liz Knox of the Brampton Thunder.

Italy registered the biggest win in team history on 23 June 2015 in a 6–2 win over Switzerland. Goals were scored by Frances Russo at 1:10, Michelle Perosin-Durante at 11:13, Kori Cheverie on the power play at 20:30, Nicole Corriero at 23:29, Annalisa Mazzarello on the power play at 29:56, and Corriero on the power play at 36:24.

=== World Championship ===
Year	Location	Result
2013	St. John's, Canada	6th place
2015	Zug, Switzerland	6th place
2017	Pardubice, Czech Republic	5th place

== Team ==
=== Head coaches ===
- 2013: Michael Iustini
- 2015: Rick DiBiase
- 2017: Rick DiBiase

=== Captains ===
- 2013: Flora Fioccola
- 2015: Christina D'Ambrogio
- 2017: Christina D'Ambrogio

== Awards and honors ==
=== World Championship ===
==== All Star selections ====
The tournament organizing committee of each Ball Hockey World Championship also announces five players selected to the All-Star Team – one goalkeeper, two defenders, and three forwards.

- 2017: Alicia Furletti Blomberg (F)
