= Meghan Agosta =

Canadian ice hockey player (born 1987)

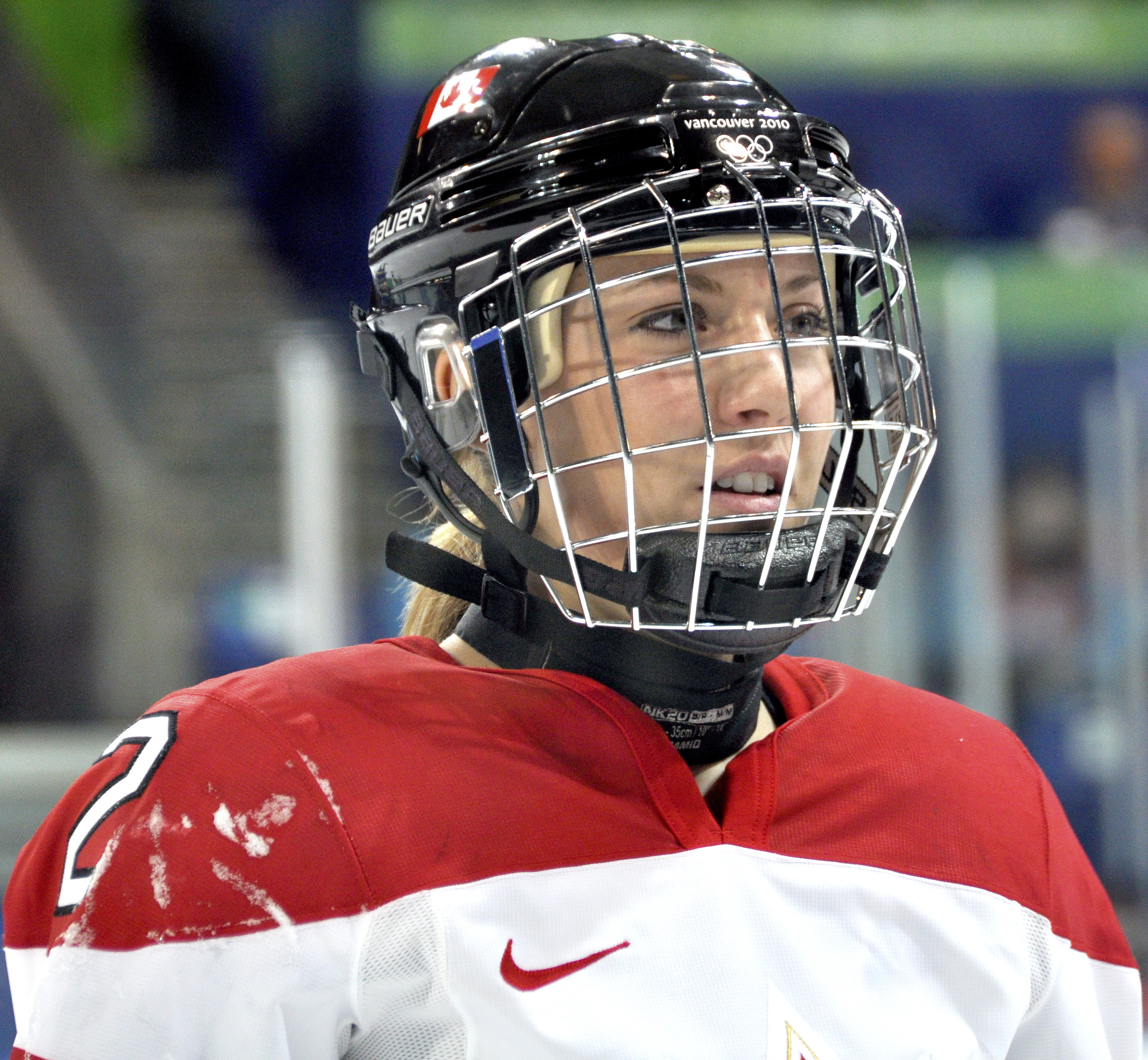
- Born: February 12, 1987 (age 39) Windsor, Ontario, Canada
- Height: 5 ft 7 in (170 cm)
- Weight: 148 lb (67 kg; 10 st 8 lb)
- Position: Forward
- Shot: Left
- Played for: Les Canadiennes de Montreal; Mercyhurst Univ.
- National team: Canada
- Playing career: 2006–2024
Medal record
Olympic Games
Gold medal – first place	2006 Turin	Team
Gold medal – first place	2010 Vancouver	Team
Gold medal – first place	2014 Sochi	Team
Silver medal – second place	2018 Pyeongchang	Team
World Championships
Gold medal – first place	2007 Canada
Gold medal – first place	2012 United States
Silver medal – second place	2008 China
Silver medal – second place	2009 Finland
Silver medal – second place	2011 Switzerland
Silver medal – second place	2013 Canada
Silver medal – second place	2016 Canada
Silver medal – second place	2017 United States

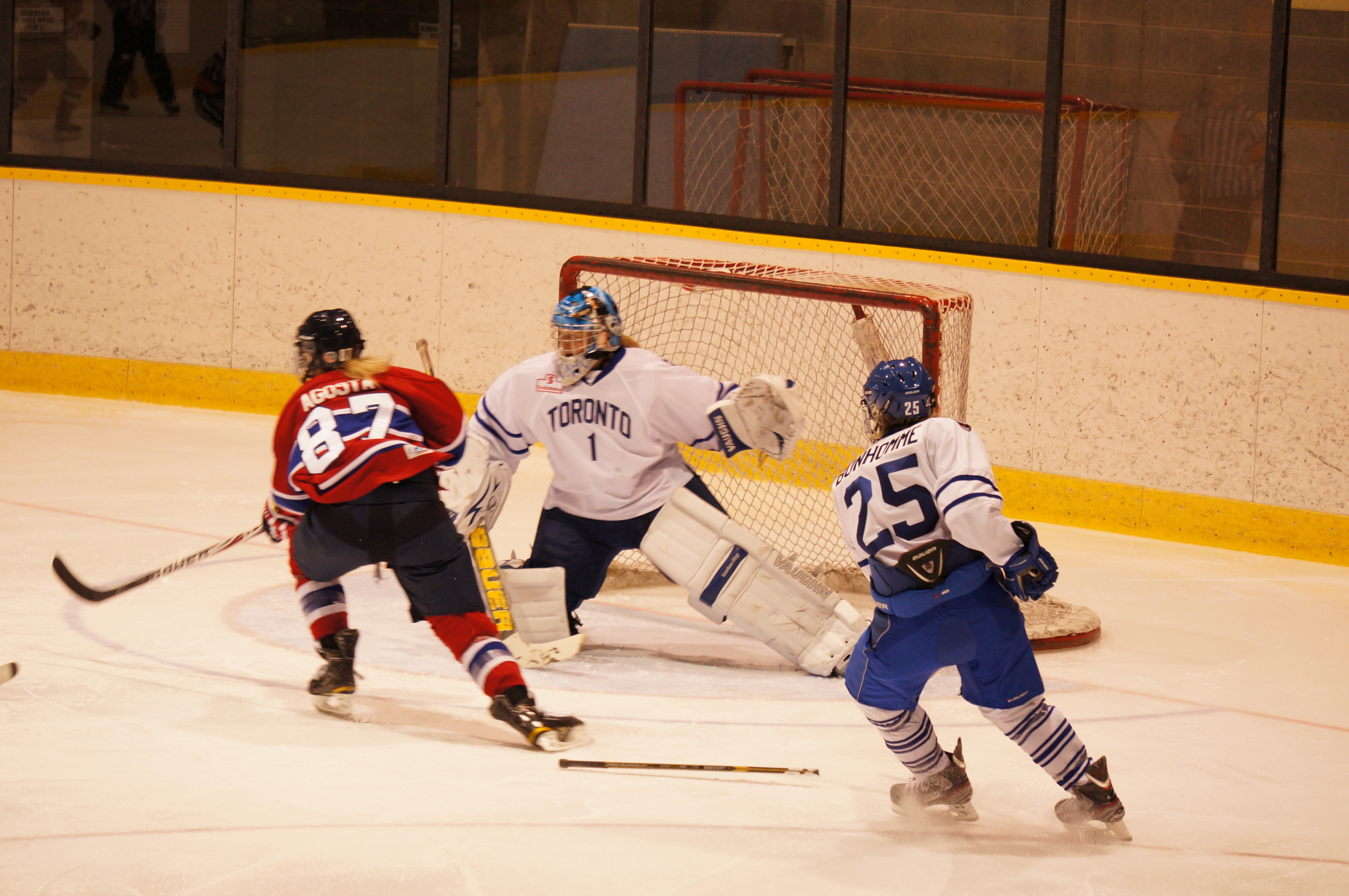
In 2011–12 season, Agosta plays for Montreal Stars

Meghan Christina Agosta (born February 12, 1987) is a Canadian women's ice hockey forward, who last played for the Montreal Stars of the Canadian Women's Hockey League. Agosta played for the Canada women's national ice hockey team and is a three-time gold medallist from the 2006, 2010 and 2014 Winter Olympics. At the 2010 Winter Olympics, Agosta was named MVP of the Women's Hockey Tournament. She is a multi-medallist at the Women's World Championships with two gold medals and six silvers.

During the 2006–07 season at Mercyhurst College in NCAA Division I hockey, Agosta was the first freshman named as a finalist for the Patty Kazmaier Award. She was also named a First Team All-American and unanimously chosen for CHA Player of the Year. Agosta led the 2008–09 Mercyhurst Lakers to the finals of the NCAA women's hockey championship and as captain that season, earned numerous accolades, including being selected as a 2009 First Team All-American, a Patty Kazmaier Award Final Three, College Hockey America Player of the Year, the CHA Three-Star Player of the Year, to the CHA All-Tournament Team, and to the Frozen Four All-Tournament Team.

== Hockey career ==
=== Minor ===
Agosta switched from figure skating to hockey at age 6. As a teenager, Agosta participated in AAA boys hockey with the Chatham-Kent Cyclones. With the Cyclones, Agosta was part of Alliance Championship teams. She later competed for the AA Windsor Wildcats of the Ontario Provincial Women's Hockey League. At the 2003 Canada Winter Games, her goal clinched the win for Team Ontario. A teammate was Haley Irwin. She was a gold medallist for Team Ontario Red at the National Under 18 championships in 2005. Agosta is an accomplished inline hockey player. She was a gold medallist for Canada at the 2004 World Inline Hockey Championship.

=== College ===
Agosta distinguished herself at Mercyhurst College as a freshman in NCAA Division I hockey during the 2006–07 season. She became the first freshman ever to make the final three for the Patty Kazmaier Award. She was also a First Team All-American and a unanimous choice for CHA Player of the Year. She helped lead Mercyhurst to the NCAA quarterfinals and to its inaugural No. 1 national ranking.

During the 2007–08 season, Agosta tied Krissy Wendell's single season record of 7 shorthanded goals. In the 2008–09 season, Agosta would tie Wendell's career mark of 16 shorthanded goals. She led the 2008–09 Mercyhurst Lakers women's ice hockey team to the finals of the NCAA women's hockey championship. She was captain of the Lakers that season, as she earned numerous accolades. These included being selected as a 2009 First Team All-American, a Patty Kazmaier Award Final Three, College Hockey America Player of the Year, CHA Three-Star Player of the Year, CHA All-Tournament Team, and the Frozen Four All-Tournament Team. For the month of October 2010 (her first month back to the NCAA), Agosta scored 10 goals and had 19 points. On January 21 and 22, Agosta recorded five points on two goals and three assists in a two-game sweep of Robert Morris. On January 21, she scored a goal and dished out two assists in a 6–3 win. The next day, she scored her 26th goal of the season while the Lakers were short-handed, and added an assist. On February 4, 2011, Meghan Agosta became the all-time leading scorer in NCAA women's hockey history with three goals and one assist in Mercyhurst College's 6–2 win over Wayne State. Wayne State goalie DeLayne Brian was the goaltender in net when Agosta broke the record. Agosta's four points gave her 286 career points, one more than ex-Harvard forward Julie Chu's record of 285 set in 2006–07. Agosta, who also owns the record for most short-handed goals and game-winning goals, added three assists in the Lakers' 3–1 win over Wayne State on February 5. On February 25, 2011, Agosta scored her 151st career goal to become all-time leading goal scorer in NCAA history.

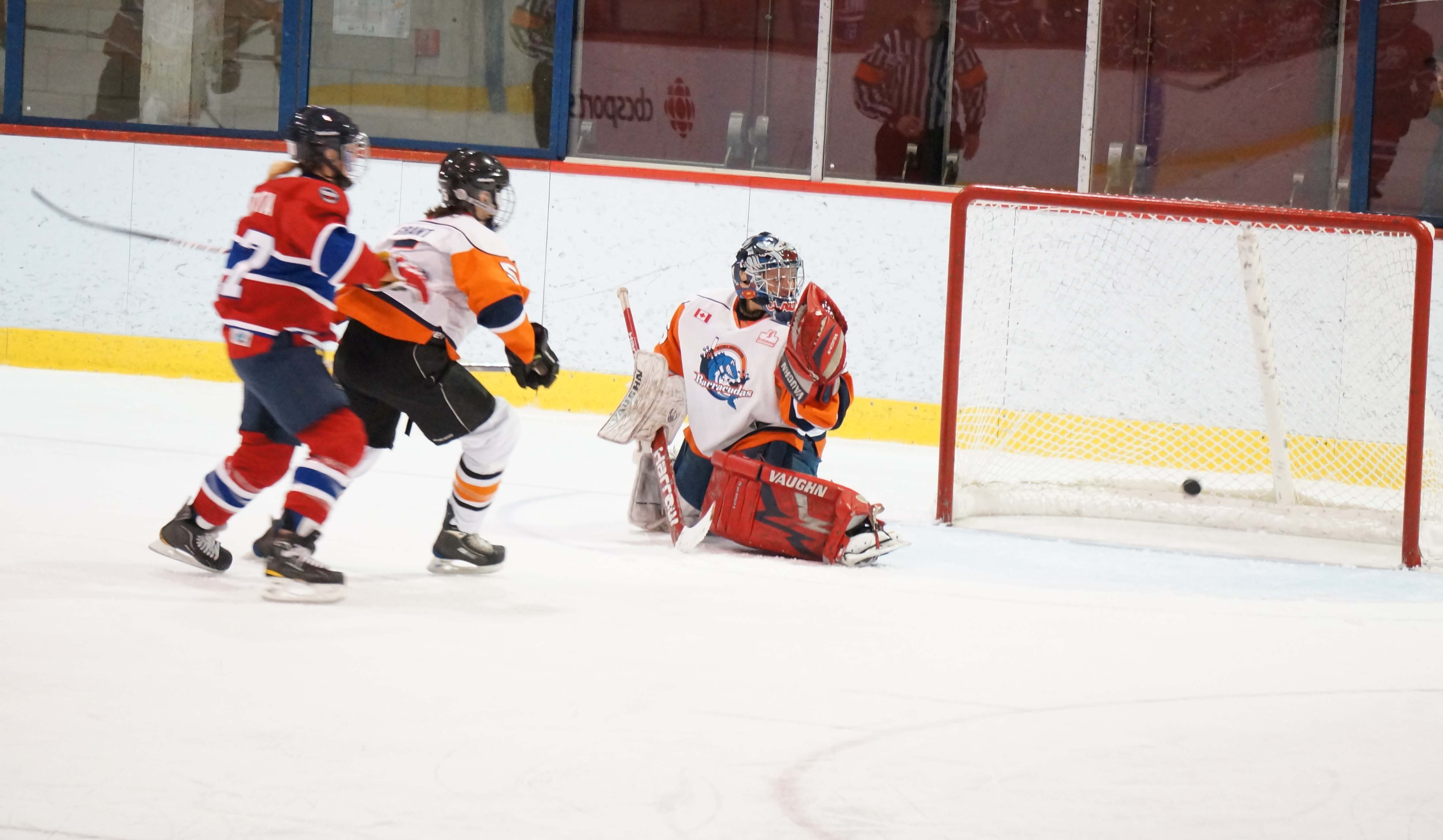
Meghan Agosta scores

She accomplished this in a 6–2 victory over the Robert Morris Colonials women's ice hockey program at the Mercyhurst Ice Center. She surpassed Harvard's Nicole Corriero, who set the record at 150 during the 2004–05 season. The goal was scored on the power play at 15:18 of the second period with the assist going to Bailey Bram. She later added her 152nd goal in the third period. Agosta was featured in Sports Illustrated's Faces in the Crowd feature in the February 21, 2011 issue (in recognition of becoming the all-time NCAA scorer). In 2011, Agosta was named CHA Player of the Year as well as a First Team All-CHA selection, marking the fourth time in her career she captured both accolades. On March 5, 2011, Agosta scored three goals in the CHA championship game. With the hat trick, she topped 300 points for her NCAA career as the Lakers defeated Syracuse 5–4 and captured its ninth straight College Hockey America title. On March 12, 2011, Agosta scored two goals in her final NCAA game, in what would be a 4–2 loss to the Boston University Terriers in the NCAA regional playoffs.

=== CWHL ===
In the 2011–12 season, Stars forward Agosta won the Angela James Bowl while breaking the league's single-season scoring record. Her 80 points (41 goals and 39 assists) broke the previous record of 69 points held by Jayna Hefford. By winning the 2012 Clarkson Cup, she became an unofficial member of the Triple Gold Club (the accomplishment by women is not yet officially recognized by the IIHF), as she became one of only five women to win the Clarkson Cup, a gold medal in Winter Olympics, and a gold medal at the IIHF World Women's Championships. She joined Caroline Ouellette, Jenny Potter, Kim St-Pierre, and Sarah Vaillancourt.

In the 2012–13 season, Agosta became the first two-winner of the Angela James Bowl.

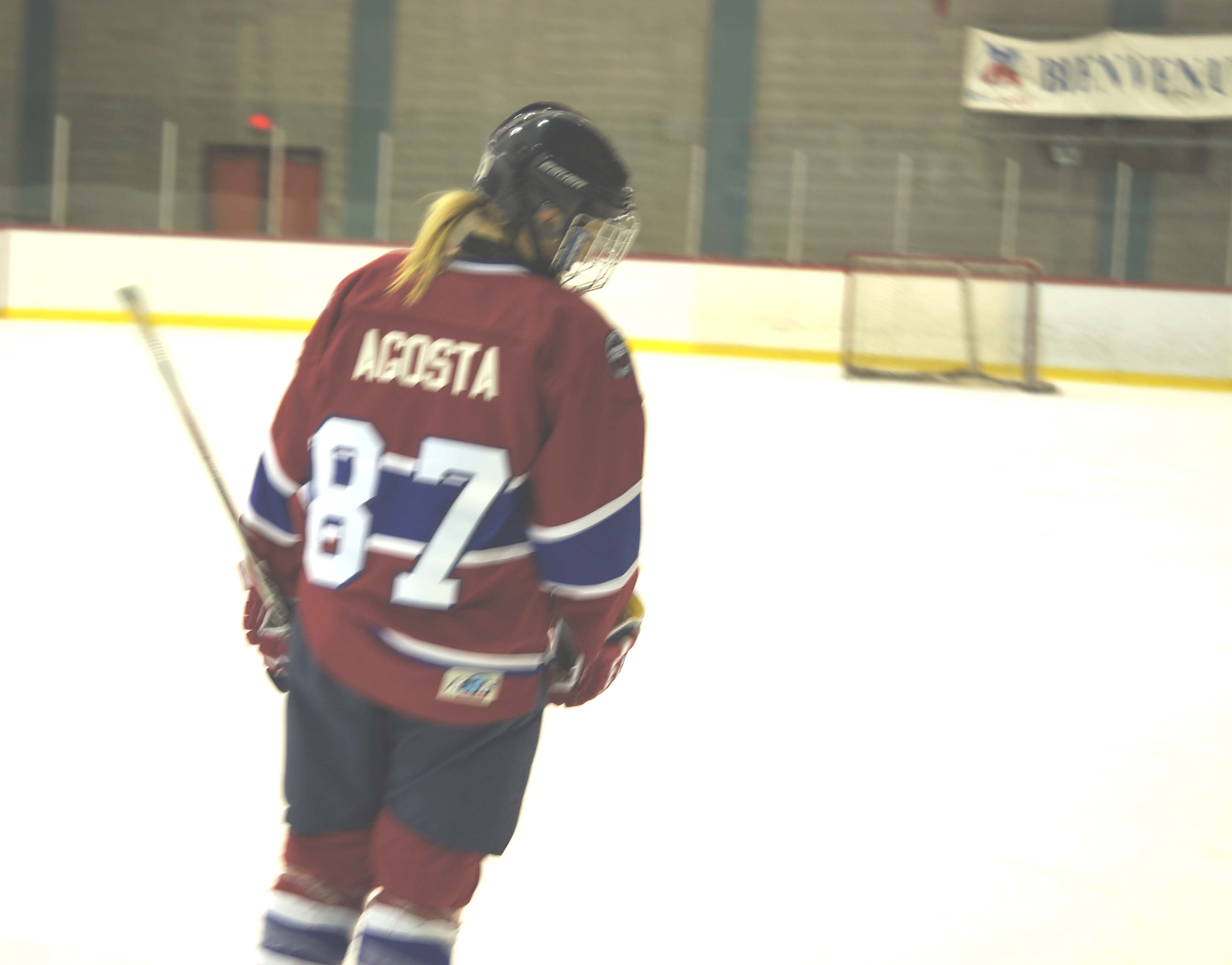
Agosta while playing in the CWHL

== International play ==
- In August 2004, she moved to Calgary to train with the national team. Agosta was an alternate for the team that finished second at the 2005 women's world championship in April. She played for the national team for the first time in August 2005 at the Four Nations Cup, and was one of the leading scorers during the exhibition phase prior to the Winter Olympics.
- On her 19th birthday, during the 2006 Winter Olympic Games in Turin, she scored a hat trick for Team Canada against the Russian national women's ice hockey team. She was the youngest member of Canada's gold medal-winning team in Turin. 2006 Winter Olympic Games
- On February 17, 2010, Agosta scored a record third Olympic hat-trick in the match against Sweden to move on to eight goals in this tournament, equalling Danielle Goyette's record for most goals in one Olympic tournament, set in 1998. Agosta went on to score 9 goals and 6 assists and two penalty minutes while helping Canada to a gold medal in the Vancouver Olympics. She was named tournament MVP at 2010 Winter Olympic Games.
- In the second game of the 2011 IIHF Eight Nations Tournament, Agosta registered a hat trick and added two assists in a 14–1 triumph over Russia. On August 31, 2011, Agosta scored a hat trick as Canada lost for just the second time in 66 all-time international meetings against Sweden by a 6–4 mark.
- With a little over two minutes left in the third period of the 2012 IIHF Women's World Championship, Agosta scored to tie the game at 4–4. She would assist on the game winner in overtime.
- Agosta was named to the 2014 Olympic roster for Canada. At the 2014 Winter Olympic Games, Meghan won her 3rd consecutive Olympic gold medal in a thrilling championship game with Canada scoring twice in the final 3 minutes to force overtime and then winning the game on a power play goal from Marie-Philip Poulin.
- Agosta was named to the 2018 Winter Olympics roster for Canada. At the Olympics, she won a silver medal after a 6-round shootout loss to the United States.
- She announced her retirement from Canada's national team in February 2024; at that time she ranked sixth all-time in goals (85) and points (176) and seventh in assists (91) in 178 career games for Team Canada.

== Personal life ==
Agosta grew up in an Italian household, in Ruthven, Ontario; a community of the town of Kingsville. She represented Canada at the 2006 World Inline Hockey Championship in Taylor, Michigan. She earned an assist in the gold medal game in a loss to the United States. Her parents' names are Nino and Char. She has three siblings, Kara, Jeric and Jade. Her brother Jeric received a full scholarship to play hockey at the University of Nebraska Omaha. She majored in criminal justice at Mercyhurst. On August 31, 2012, Agosta married Marco Marciano, the Canadian national women's team goaltending and video coach. Marciano is also the goaltending coach of the Blainville-Boisbriand Armada of the QMJHL. Agosta separated from Marciano in the fall of 2014 and changed her name back to Agosta shortly thereafter.

In fall 2014, Agosta took a break from hockey and joined the Vancouver Police Department as a probationary constable. Agosta graduated from the Vancouver Police Department Police Academy in May 2015. She took a year leave from the Vancouver Police Department to train and play with the Canadian national team before the 2018 Olympics.

In 2020 she took part in the televised reality competition show "Battle of Blades" with figure skater Andrew Poje.

Agosta and Vancouver police officer Jason Robillard have two children together — Chance and Rylan.

== Career statistics ==
=== Regular season and playoffs ===
			Regular season					Playoffs
Season	Team	League	GP	G	A	Pts	PIM	GP	G	A	Pts	PIM
2006–07	Mercyhurst University	CHA	35	38	36	74	26	—	—	—	—	—
2007–08	Mercyhurst University	CHA	33	40	25	65	26	—	—	—	—	—
2008–09	Mercyhurst University	CHA	32	41	37	78	36	—	—	—	—	—
2009–10	Mercyhurst University	CHA	—	—	—	—	—	—	—	—	—	—
2010–11	Mercyhurst University	CHA	34	38	47	85	30	—	—	—	—	—
2011–12	Montréal Stars	CWHL	27	41	39	80	16	4	4	2	6	0
2012–13	Montréal Stars	CWHL	23	16	30	46	14	4	1	2	3	2
CWHL totals			50	57	69	126	30	8	5	4	9	2

=== International ===
Year	Team	Event	Result	GP	G	A	Pts	PIM
2006	Canada	OG	1st place, gold medalist(s)	5	3	1	4	2
2007	Canada	WC	1st place, gold medalist(s)	5	0	4	4	4
2008	Canada	WC	2nd place, silver medalist(s)	5	3	0	3	8
2009	Canada	WC	2nd place, silver medalist(s)	5	2	2	4	2
2010	Canada	OG	1st place, gold medalist(s)	5	9	6	15	2
2011	Canada	WC	2nd place, silver medalist(s)	5	0	5	5	2
2012	Canada	WC	1st place, gold medalist(s)	5	4	4	8	8
2013	Canada	WC	2nd place, silver medalist(s)	5	4	2	6	0
2014	Canada	OG	1st place, gold medalist(s)	5	3	1	4	0
2016	Canada	WC	2nd place, silver medalist(s)	5	1	1	2	2
2017	Canada	WC	2nd place, silver medalist(s)	5	2	1	3	0
2018	Canada	OG	2nd place, silver medalist(s)	5	2	3	5	4
Senior totals				60	33	30	63	34

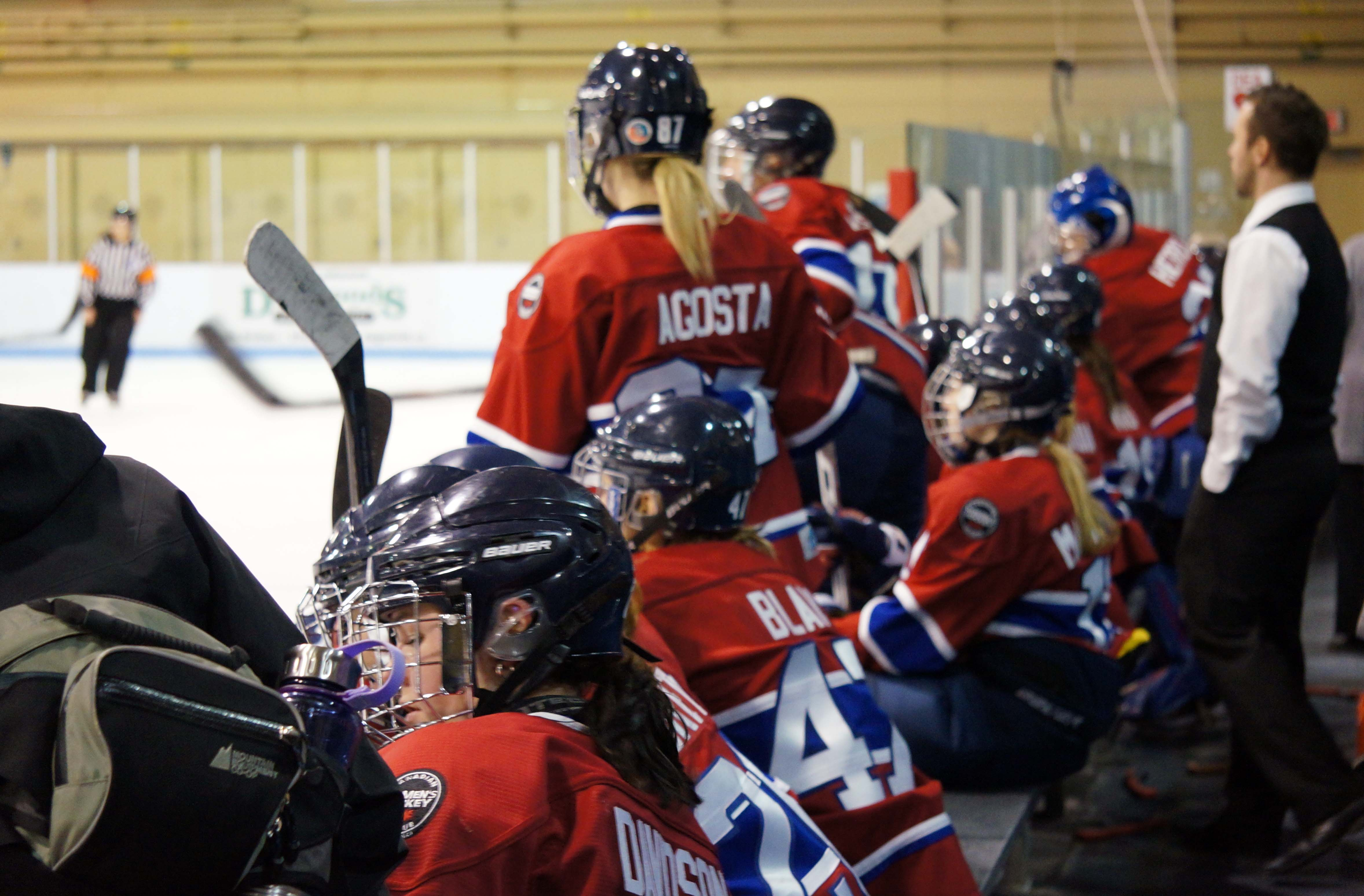
Agosta with Montreal Stars in CWHL

== Awards and honours ==
=== IIHF ===
- Vancouver 2010 Olympics, Media All-Star Team
- Vancouver 2010 Olympics, Directorate Award, Best Forward
- Vancouver 2010 Olympics, Most Valuable Player, Women's Hockey Tournament

=== CWHL ===
- CWHL Most Valuable Player, 2011–12
- Angela James Bowl, 2011–12 and 2012–13
- CWHL First All-Star Team, 2011–12 and 2012–13
- CWHL All-Rookie Team, 2011–12

=== NCAA ===
- College Hockey America, Player of the Month, October 2010
- College Hockey America, Player of the Month, January 2011
- CHA Player of the Year (2007–2009, 2011)
- First Team All-CHA selection (2007–2009, 2011)
- 2011 CHA Tournament Most Valuable Player
- 2011 First Team All-America selection
- Finalist, Patty Kazmaier Memorial Award (2007, 2008, 2009, 2011)

=== Other ===
- Finalist for the Women's Sports Foundation's 2010 Sportswoman of the Year Team Award
- 2011 Top collegiate female athlete, 47th Annual Erie Charity Sports Banquet

== See also ==
- 2006–07 Mercyhurst Lakers women's ice hockey season
- 2007–08 Mercyhurst Lakers women's ice hockey season
- 2008–09 Mercyhurst Lakers women's ice hockey season
- 2010–11 Mercyhurst Lakers women's ice hockey season
- Ice hockey at the 2006 Winter Olympics
- Ice hockey at the 2010 Winter Olympics
- Ice hockey at the 2014 Winter Olympics

Awards and achievements
Preceded by Tessa Bonhomme	CWHL first overall draft pick 2011	Succeeded by Hillary Pattenden
