= Kendra Fisher =

Canadian ice hockey player

- Born: October 20, 1979 (age 46) Kincardine, Ontario, Canada
- Height: 5 ft 11 in (180 cm)
- Position: Goaltender
- Catches: Left
- NWHL CWHL team: Toronto Aeros; Vaughan Flames (2009-10); Toronto Furies (2010-11)
- Playing career: 1998–present
Medal record
Representing Canada
Inline World Championships
Gold medal – first place	2016 Italy
Silver medal – second place	2014 France
Gold medal – first place	2012 Colombia
Silver medal – second place	2010 Czech Republic

Kendra Fisher (born October 20, 1979) is a women's ice hockey goaltender who has competed for the Canada women's national inline hockey team, having participated at four FIRS Inline Hockey World Championships. In addition, Fisher also competed in women's ice hockey with the first NWHL, followed by a stint in the CWHL, including with the Toronto Furies in their inaugural season.

== Playing career ==
=== Ice hockey ===
Fisher was the first female player in the history of the Grey-Bruce Highlanders Minor "AAA" program during the 1995-96 season.

She competed in the Esso Women's Nationals in 2002, 2004 and 2005, respectively. At the 2005 tournament, she was part of the Host Ontario team that played in Sarnia, Ontario. In the first game of said tournament, she posted a shutout in a 15-0 victory over Alberta. Fisher was part of the gold medal winning team in the tournament. During the 2009-10 season, Fisher competed for the Vaughan Flames. One of the highlights of her season was a 4-1 victory over the Mississauga Chiefs on December 13, 2009. The following season, she was selected ninth overall in the 2010 CWHL Draft by the Toronto Furies. She would compete for the club in their inaugural season of 2010-11, sharing goaltending duties with Sami Jo Small.

=== Inline hockey ===
In the gold medal game at the 2016 World Inline Hockey Championships, Fisher gained the start in net for Canada, a 3-1 final against the United States.

== Career stats ==
This is an incomplete list

=== Esso Women's Nationals ===
Year	Event	GP	MIN	GA	SO	GAA	W	L	T	Sv %
2004	Esso Women's Nationals	2	40	4	1	2.00	2	0	0	.938

== Awards and honours ==
- Top Goaltender, 2002 Esso Women's Nationals

== Personal ==
Fisher was invited to a tryout for the Canadian national women's ice hockey team in 1999. Unfortunately, a case of anxiety disorder prevented her from finishing the tryout camp.

Fisher now speaks publicly to various school boards to promote greater awareness on mental health. She shares her story on her personal social media accounts as a means of helping others to cope with their own mental health woes. In 2015, Kendra revealed in an interview that she was gay.
