= 2002–03 Mercyhurst Lakers women's ice hockey season =

CHA Regular season champions CHA Playoff champions
- Conference: CHA

Rankings
- USA Today/USA Hockey Magazine: 10
- USCHO.com/CBS College Sports: 10

Record
- Overall: 25-8-1

Coaches and captains
- Head coach: Michael Sisti
- Alternate captain: Chrissy Yule

The Mercyhurst Lakers women's ice hockey team represented Mercyhurst College. The Lakers played in the first season of College Hockey America and CJ Ireland was team captain. In the Lakers first CHA season, the Lakers were 25-8-1. During the regular season, the Lakers finished first in the CHA. The Lakers would proceed to win the conference's playoffs, and finish the year ranked 10th in the national polls. Mercyhurst won the regular-season CHA title with a conference record of 6 wins and 0 losses. In the 6 conference games, the Lakers outscored its opposition by a 26-9 mark.

== Regular season ==
=== Players ===
- Desi Clark started eleven games while appearing in twelve. She had eight wins, two losses and one tie. Her goals against average was 1.64 and she had two shutouts. In addition, Clark was a four-time CHA Defensive Player of the Week.
- Captain CJ Ireland was in her senior year. She scored 43 goals and set a record for most goals scored in one season by a Lakers player (since broken). Her exploits were featured in Sport's Illustrated's Faces in the Crowd section (week of April 13). Ireland graduated as the career leader in goals, assists, and points (since broken).
- Danielle Lansing appeared in 34 games and registered twelve points (five goals and seven assists). During the season, she was honoured as CHA Rookie of the Week on three separate occasions.
- Sara McDonald appeared in 34 games. Statiscally, she led the Lakers with 16 goals. Overall, she had 26 points and tied for the team lead.
- Samantha Shirley appeared in 34 games and tied for the team lead with 26 points (15 goals and 11 assists). Statistically, Shirley led the Lakers squad in power play goals (5) and game-winning goals (4). Shirley was named CHA Rookie of the Year and during the season, she was named CHA Rookie of the Week six times.

== Player stats ==
Note: GP= Games played; G= Goals; A= Assists; PTS = Points; PIM = Penalties in minutes; GW = Game winning goals; PPL = Power-play goals; SHG = Short-handed goals

Player	GP	G	A	Pts	GW	PPL	SHG
Sara McDonald	34	16	10	26	3	3	0
Samantha Shirley	33	15	11	26	4	5	0
Jessica Dillabough	34	7	18	25	1	1	0
Chrissy Yule	34	8	16	24	1	3	0
Jennifer Jeffrey	34	7	17	24	2	1	0
C.J. Ireland	34	11	12	23	2	3	1
Lyndsay Barch	34	10	8	18	3	2	0
Randi Pilger	32	6	7	13	2	3	0
Lindsay Dellow	33	3	10	13	0	0	0
Danielle Lansing	34	5	7	12	2	1	0
Britney Millar	34	4	8	12	1	2	0
K.C. Gallo	31	4	5	9	3	2	0
Aimee Collins	33	3	5	8	1	0	0
Tracy Logan	32	2	1	3	0	0	0
Seanna Murphy	25	1	1	2	0	0	0
Christy Vinge	13	0	2	2	0	0	0
Mariann MacDougall	33	0	1	1	0	0	0
Rachelle Haight	6	0	1	1	0	0	0
Elizabeth Betteridge	33	0	1	1	0	0	0
Tiffany Ribble	23	0	0	0	0	0	0
Natalie Schembri	14	0	0	0	0	0	0
Kerry Ryan	22	0	0	0	0	0	0
Shivaun Siegl	1	0	0	0	0	0	0
Desirae Clark	12	0	0	0	0	0	0

== Awards and honors ==
- Desi Clark, CHA All-Academic Team.
- CJ Ireland, CHA All-First Team
- CJ Ireland, CHA All-Academic Team.
- CJ Ireland, Mercyhurst College Female Student Athlete of the Year.
- Danielle Lansing, All-CHA Rookie Team.
- Sara McDonald, CHA Offensive Player of the Week (Week of February 11)
- Sara McDonald, CHA All-Academic Team
- Sara McDonald, First Team All-CHA
- Sara McDonald, Division I Academic All-American
- Tiffany Ribble, NCAA leader, 2002-03 season, Save percentage, .932
- Tiffany Ribble, NCAA leader, 2002-03 season, Goals Against Average, .932
- Samantha Shirley, All-CHA Rookie Team
- Samantha Shirley, CHA All-Tournament Team
- Samantha Shirley, CHA Rookie-of-the-Year.
- Chrissy Yule, CHA Offensive Player of the Week (Week of January 14)
- Chrissy Yule, CHA All-Tournament Team
