= Nicole Corriero =

Canadian ice hockey forward

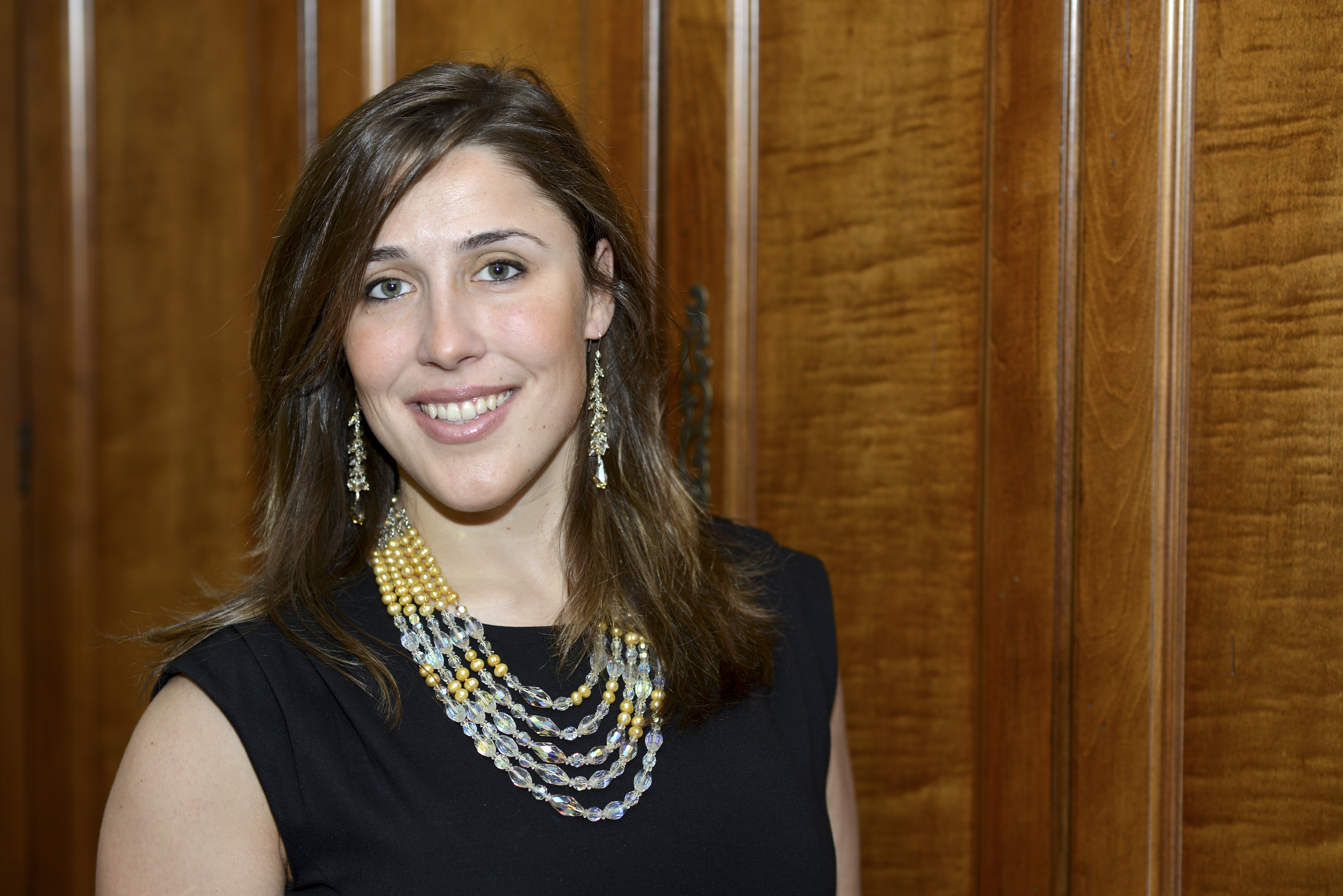
- Born: 27 October 1983 (age 42) Thornhill, Ontario, Canada
- Height: 5 ft 5 in (165 cm)
- Weight: 155 lb (70 kg; 11 st 1 lb)
- Position: Forward
- Shoots: Right
- ECAC team: Harvard Crimson
- National team: Canada
- Playing career: 2001–present

Mary Nicole Corriero (born 27 October 1983) is a Canadian 3-time All-American ice hockey forward and former captain of the Harvard Crimson women's ice hockey team.

Corriero tied former Crimson player Jennifer Botterill's record for most points (10) in one NCAA game on November 7, 2003, during the Union Dutchwomen vs. Harvard Crimson game. She continues to hold the NCAA record for Goals Per Game in a season with 1.64, set in the 2004–05 season, where she scored 59 goals in 36 games.

Corriero was nominated for an ESPN 'ESPY' Award in 2005 for Best Female Collegiate Athlete.

Corriero became Premier Hockey Federation (PHF)'s Player Association Executive Director in 2022.

== Education ==
Corriero graduated from Harvard in 2005 with a B.A. in Sociology.

Corriero attended Law School at the University of Detroit Mercy and the University of Windsor in their joint JD/LLB Program and graduated with both her JD and LLB degrees in June 2008 in Toronto, Ontario. She has been a member of the Ontario Trial Lawyers Association since 2008 and served two terms as Chair of the Women's Trial Lawyers Caucus.

After her articles, Corriero was called to the bar on 19 June 2009. She practiced Personal Injury Law and was a partner with the law firm Lofranco-Corriero.

== Playing career ==
Before attending Harvard, Corriero captained the North York Junior Aeros and the Scarborough Sharks.

Corriero represented Ontario at the 1999 Canada Winter Games in Corner Brook, Newfoundland, where the team went on to win a gold medal.

Corriero served as Assistant Captain to Team Ontario 'Red,' that took gold at the 2001 National Women's Under-18 Championship.

=== NCAA ===
Corriero played at Harvard University on their Varsity Women's Ice Hockey Team from 2001 to 2005.

During the 2004-05 season, Corriero was the captain of the Harvard Crimson women’s ice hockey team. In that season she became the all-time women's collegiate record holder for goals in a single season by scoring her 52nd goal on 5 March 2005, breaking the previous record of 51, shared by Harvard's Tammy Shewchuk and Northeastern's Vicky Sunohara, both of whom are Canadian Olympic Gold Medalists.

On 27 March 2005, Corriero tied the all-time collegiate record of 59 goals in a season, set by Michigan State's Mike Donnelly in 1986, with her first goal against St. Lawrence in the Frozen Four.

=== International hockey ===
She was invited to Hockey Canada's National Women's Under 22 Development Camp in July 2003. Corriero was one of several players of Italian Canadian heritage that competed for the Italy women's national ball hockey team at the 2015 world championship. She would finish the tournament as Italy's leading scorer with eight points, ranking tenth overall, respectively.

== Records ==
As of the 2020–21 NCAA Women's Ice Hockey Season, Corriero holds the following NCAA Individual Records:

- Points scored in a game – 10 points (7 November 2003, Harvard v. Union), tied with Jennifer Botterill
- Goals scored in a game – 6 goals (7 November 2003, Harvard v. Union), tied with Jenny Schmidgall-Potter
- Goals scored in a season – 59 goals (2004–05 season)
- Goals per game (average) in a season – 1.64 goals per game (2004–05 season; 59 goals in 36 games)

Honors and awards

- 2002 Ivy League Rookie of the Year
- Top-10 Finalist in 2004 and 2005 for the Patty Kazmaier Award.
- In 2005, she was a nominee in ESPN's ESPY category of Best Female College Athlete.
- She was the first Harvard Women's hockey player to be awarded the Sarah Devens Award
- 2005 ECAC Tournament Most Valuable Player
- The Mary G. Paget Prize for Outstanding Contribution to Women's Athletics at Harvard University
- In November 2005, Nicole was honoured in Toronto, Ontario, by the National Congress of Italian Canadians for their annual Youth Achievement Award, recognizing scholastic and athletic excellence as well as community involvement.
- Inducted into the Beanpot Hall of Fame in 2012
