= York Lions women's ice hockey =

Canadian university ice hockey team

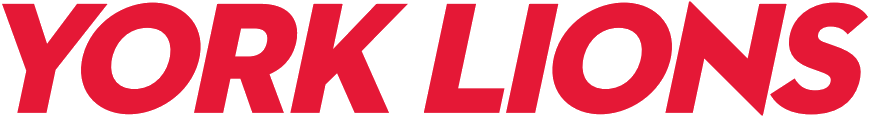
- University: York University
- Conference: OUA; West Division
- Head coach: Dan Church; Since 2004–05 season
- Arena: NFP Athletic Centre; Toronto, Ontario
- Colors: Red, Black, and White

U Sports tournament appearances
- 2020

Conference tournament champions
- 1983, 1987, 1997

The York Lions women's ice hockey team is an active ice hockey program representing the York Lions athletic department of York University in the Ontario University Athletics conference under the authority of U Sports. The Lions have won three OUA championships in their program history while making one appearance in the U Sports women's ice hockey championship tournament since their inception in 1998. The Lions play their home games at the NFP Athletic Centre in Toronto, Ontario.

== History ==
On February 11, 2000, the Ontario University Athletics women's ice hockey program saw its longest game take place. The University of Toronto's Rhonda Mitchell scored on a 35-foot slap shot. It was the 5:07 mark of the eighth period and the Varsity Blues defeated York University. Although the victory allowed the U of T to advance to the OUA gold medal game, it was the longest in the history of Canadian women's hockey (since broken). The game lasted over five hours and ten minutes. York's player of the game was goaltender Debra Ferguson, as she valiantly made 63 saves over 125 minutes.

On February 5, 2011, two Lions players, forward Courtney Unruh and defender Kelsey Webster (and assistant coach Stacey Colarossi) were part of the Team Canada roster that captured gold at the 2011 Winter Universiade title as Canada defeated Finland 4–1 in the gold-medal final. Autumn Mills was the Ontario University Athletics (OUA) nominee for the 2011 Canadian Interuniversity Sport (CIS) Marion Hillard Award.

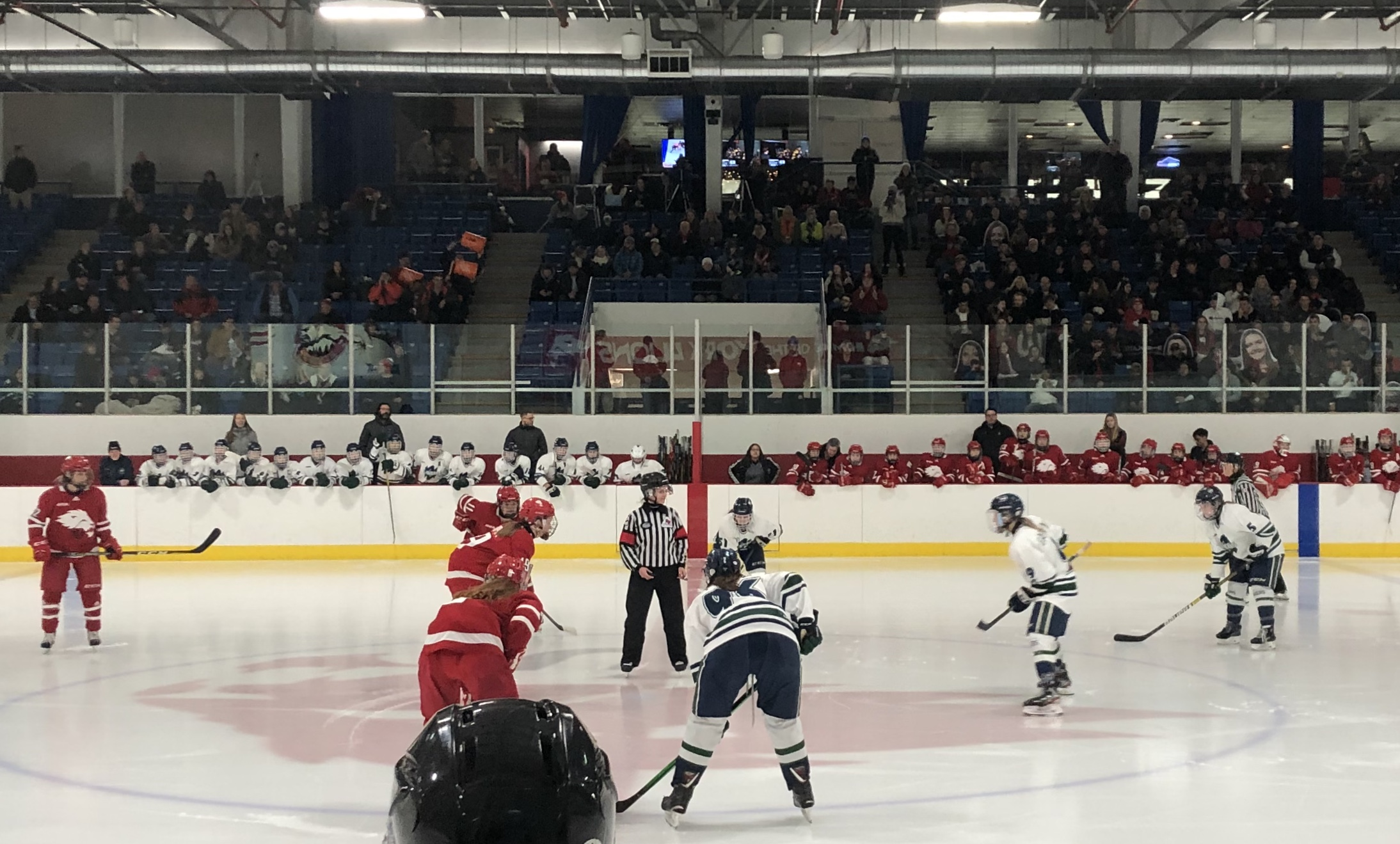
The Lions hosted and defeated the Nipissing Lakers in game 2 of the 2020 OUA Semi-Final.

After seven years of finishing out of the playoffs, the 2019–20 Lions team finished with a 14–0–8–2 record and a third-place finish in the OUA. The Lions swept both the Waterloo Warriors and Nipissing Lakers in the OUA playoffs before losing the McCaw Cup championship to the Toronto Varsity Blues in a sudden death 1–3 loss. Because the Lions were an OUA finalist, the team qualified for the U Sports women's ice hockey championship for the first time in program history in 2020. However, because of the COVID-19 pandemic in Canada, the tournament was cancelled on the day that the Lions were scheduled to play against the McGill Martlets in the opening round game. The 2020–21 season was cancelled due to the pandemic and the Lions finished last in their division following their return to play in 2021–22.

=== Recent results ===
Year	GP	W	OTW	T	L	OTL	P	Standing	Postseason
2003–04	22	2	–	1	19	–	5	4th in OUA East	Did not qualify for playoffs
2004–05	22	1	–	2	19	0	4	4th in OUA East	Did not qualify for playoffs
2005–06	24	6	–	8	10	0	20	7th in OUA	Did not qualify for playoffs
2006–07	24	9	–	1	14	0	19	7th in OUA	Did not qualify for playoffs
2007–08	27	11	–	4	11	1	27	6th in OUA	Lost OUA Quarter-Final (0–1 (SO)) vs. Guelph
2008–09	27	15	–	0	12	0	30	4th in OUA	Lost OUA Quarter-Final (0–2) vs. Brock
2009–10	27	13	4	–	9	1	45	3rd in OUA	Lost OUA Quarter-Final (2–3) vs. Windsor
2010–11	27	7	4	–	16	0	22	7th in OUA	Lost OUA Quarter-Final vs. Brock (0–2 series)
2011–12	26	12	1	–	12	1	28	6th in OUA	Won OUA Quarter-Final vs. Queen's (2–1 series); Lost OUA Semi-Final vs. Western (1–2 series)
2012–13	26	6	2	–	15	3	22	9th in OUA	Did not qualify for playoffs
2013–14	24	4	2	–	16	2	16	11th in OUA	Did not qualify for playoffs
2014–15	24	11	–	–	10	3	25	10th in OUA	Did not qualify for playoffs
2015–16	24	8	1	–	11	4	27	10th in OUA	Did not qualify for playoffs
2016–17	24	6	0	–	15	3	20	12th in OUA	Did not qualify for playoffs
2017–18	24	8	0	–	14	2	28	10th in OUA	Did not qualify for playoffs
2018–19	24	8	3	–	12	1	31	9th in OUA	Did not qualify for playoffs
2019–20	24	14	0	–	8	2	44	3rd in OUA	Won OUA Quarter-Final vs. Waterloo (2–0 series); Won OUA Semi-Final vs. Nipissing (2–0 series); Lost OUA Championship (1–3) vs. Toronto; U Sports championship cancelled due to COVID-19 pandemic
2020–21	Cancelled due to the COVID-19 pandemic								
2021–22	17	3	1	–	12	1	12	11th in OUA	Did not qualify for playoffs
2022–23	27	7	2	–	18	0	12	6th in OUA East	Did not qualify for playoffs
2023–24	28	8	1	–	17	2	44	4th in OUA East	Won OUA Quarter-Final vs. Nipissing (2–0 series); Lost OUA Semi-Final vs. Waterloo (1–2 series)
2024–25	26	7	4	–	13	2	31	5th in OUA West	Won OUA West Play-In vs. Windsor 5–3; Lost OUA Quarter-Final vs. Guelph (0–2 series)
2025–26	26	6	2	–	16	2	24	6th in OUA West	Did not qualify for playoffs

==== International contests ====
Season	Date	Opponent	Score
2009–10	October 3, 2009	Chinese Olympic hockey team	1–4
2009–10	October 4, 2009	Chinese Olympic hockey team	2–6

=== Season team scoring champion ===
Year	Player	GP	G	A	PTS	PIM
2025-26	Alexa Giantsopoulos	26	6	7	13	18
2024-25	Alexa Giantsopoulos	24	8	13	21	16
2023-24	Alexa Giantsopoulos	28	10	6	16	14
2022-23	Brooke Anderson	24	6	5	11	8
2021-22	Courtney Gardiner	17	5	7	12	16
2019-20	Taylor Davison	24	4	16	20	28
2018-19	Erin Locke	14	9	11	20	0

== Lions in pro hockey ==
= CWHL All-Star	= NWHL All-Star	= Clarkson Cup Champion	= Isobel Cup Champion

Player	Position	Team	League	Accomplishments
Kristen Barbara	Defense	Markham Thunder; PWHPA GTA; Toronto Six; Metropolitan Riveters	CWHL; PWHPA; NWHL	2018 Clarkson Cup champion
Mandy Cole	Forward	Brampton Thunder	CWHL	
Allyson Fox	Forward	Brampton Thunder (2007–2012)	CWHL	Participated in the 2010 Clarkson Cup
Courtney Gardiner	Forward	Toronto Six	PHF	Won 2023 Isobel Cup
Kerri Palmer	Defense	Brampton Thunder	CWHL	
Kelsey Webster	Defense	Strathmore Rockies (2009–10); Calgary Inferno (2011–2016)	WWHL; CWHL	Won the 2016 Clarkson Cup with the Calgary Inferno

=== Lions selected in the CWHL Draft ===
Player	Year	Position	Team	Selection
Courtney Unruh	2010 CWHL Draft	Forward	Brampton Thunder	#29
Allyson Fox	2010	Forward	Brampton Thunder	#38
Michelle Daniels	2010	Defense	Brampton Thunder	#47
Kelsey Webster	2010	Defense	Brampton Thunder	#53
Mandy Cole	2010	Forward	Brampton Thunder	#59
Kerri Palmer	2010	Defense	Brampton Thunder	#77
Kristen Barbara	2016 CWHL Draft	Defense	Brampton Thunder	#28

=== Lions selected in the NWHL Draft ===
Taylor Davison made U Sports history, becoming the highest drafted player from a U Sports team to be taken in the NWHL Draft. As a side note, Davison's selection was announced by Angela James.

Player	Year	Team	Selection
Erin Locke	2020 NWHL Draft	Toronto Six	#15
Taylor Davison	2021 NWHL Draft	Toronto Six	#5

== Awards and honours ==
=== Team MVP ===
This is an incomplete list

- 2009–10: Kelsey Webster
- 2010–11: Courtney Unruh
- 2011–12: Lisa Stathopulos
- 2012–13: Lisa Stathopulos
- 2013–14: Megan Lee
- 2014–15: Lisa Stathopulos
- 2015–16: Megan Lee
- 2016–17: Erin Locke
- 2017–18: Erin Locke
- 2018–19: Erin Locke
- 2019–20:

=== School honours ===
- Autumn Mills, York University female athlete of the week for the period ending Jan. 30, 2011.
- 2011 York Lions Athletics Bryce M. Taylor Award: Autumn Mills
- 2012 York Lions Athletics Female Rookie of the Year, Kristen Barbara
- 2015 Charles Saundercook Memorial Trophy: Lisa Stathopulos
- 2016 Roar Cup
- 2021 Sport Council Award: Lauren Dubie (co-winner with rugby player Lauren Walter)

==== Lions Legacy Awards ====
- 2015 Lions Legacy Awards: Kiri Langford Co-winner
- 2016 Lions Legacy Awards: Megan Lee
- 2017 Lions Legacy Awards: Rianna Langford and Amy Locke (co-winner with soccer player Marilyn Grammenopoulos and track & field competitor Muad Issa)
- 2019 Lions Legacy Awards: Jenna Gray (co-winner with volleyball player Cadence Currie and track & field athlete Bailey Francis)
- 2021 Lions Legacy Awards: Kaleb Dahlgren and Lauren Dubie (co-winner with soccer player Teni Odetoyinbo)

=== U Sports honours ===
- Kelsey Webster, 2010 All-CIS Second Team
- Kristen Barbara, CIS All-Rookie Team (2011–12)

=== OUA honours ===
- Lisa Stathopulos, OUA Most Valuable Player (2014–15)
- Erin Locke, OUA Marion Hilliard Award (2019–20)
- Ava Ricker-Singh, OUA Marion Hilliard Award (2024–25)
- Abby Hicks, 2025-26 OUA West Champion of EDI (Equity, Diversity, Inclusion) Award
- Abby Hicks, 2025-26 OUA West Marion Hilliard Award

=== OUA in-season ===
- Autumn Mills, Pioneer Petroleums Ontario University Athletics (OUA) female athlete of the week for the period ending Jan. 30, 2011.

=== OUA All-Stars ===
==== First Team ====
- Marnie Barow, First Team (1990–91)
- Marnie Barow, Second Team (1991–92)
- Marnie Barow, First Team (1992–93)
- Michelle Clayton, First Team (1993–94)
- Michelle Clayton, First Team (1995–96)
- Taylor Davison, First Team (2019–20)
- Allyson Fox, First Team (1996–97)
- Debra Ferguson, First Team (1996–97)
- Sari Krooks, First Team (1996–97)
- Sari Krooks, First Team (1999–2000)
- Katie Quinn, First Team (1995–96)
- Melanie Roach, First Team (1998–99)
- Melanie Roach, First Team (1999–2000)
- Kelsey Webster, 2010 All-OUA First Team

==== Second Team ====
- Heather Balbraith, Second Team (1996–97)
- Michelle Campbell, Second Team (1989–90)
- Michelle Clayton, Second Team (1994–95)
- Allyson Fox, Second Team (1995–96)
- Allyson Fox, Second Team (1997–98)
- Collette Good, Second Team (1997–98)
- Karent Kett, Second Team (1998–99)
- Katie Quinn, Second Team (1993–94)
- Katie Quinn, Second Team (1994–95)
- Shanley White, Second Team (1997–98)

=== Postseason awards ===
- Debra Ferguson, Player of the Game, OWIAA Final (February 25, 1997)
- Debra Ferguson, Player of the Game, OUA Semifinal (February 11, 2000)
- Collette Good, Player of the Game, OWIAA Semi-final (February 24, 1997)

== International ==
- In April 2011, Lions player Kiri Langford was a member of the New Zealand national team that won the gold medal at the 2011 IIHF World Women's Championship Division IV competition in Reykjavik, Iceland.
- During the month of August 2011, it was announced that Lions head coach Dan Church would also serve as the head coach during the 2011–12 Canada women's national ice hockey team.

Player	Event	Result
Courtney Unruh	2011 Winter Universiade	Gold
Kelsey Webster	2009 Winter Universiade	Gold
Kelsey Webster	2011 Winter Universiade	Gold

- Dan Church Head Coach Canada: 2009 Winter Universiade
