= Nipissing Lakers women's ice hockey =

Nipissing Lakers women's ice hockey program

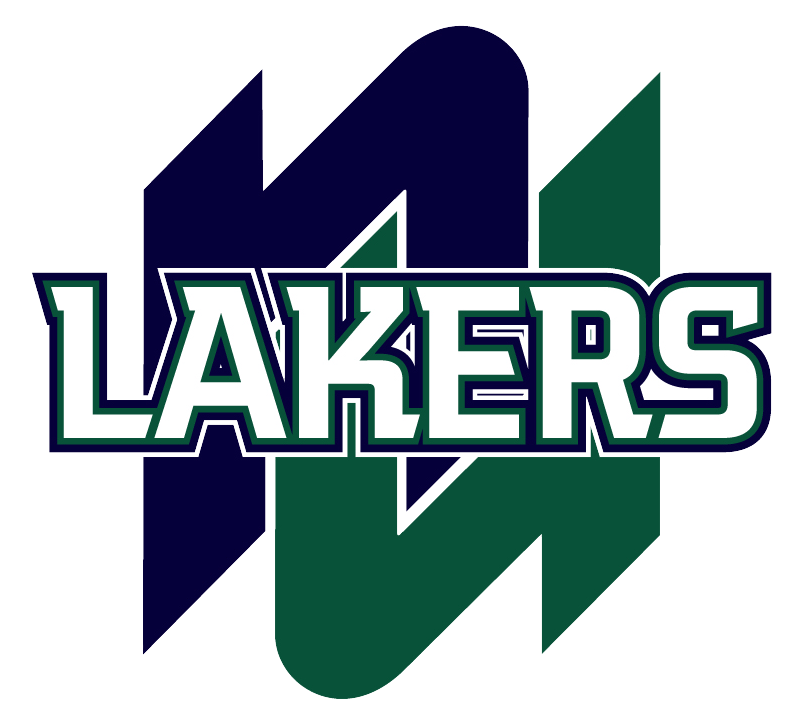
- University: Nipissing University
- Conference: OUA; East Division
- Governing Body: U Sports
- Head coach: Darren Turcotte; Since 2013-14 season
- Assistant coaches: Madison Solie; Kiara Jefferies; Patrick Rochefort
- Arena: North Bay Memorial Gardens; North Bay
- Colors: Blue and Green

U Sports tournament appearances
- 2022, 2023

The Nipissing Lakers women's ice hockey program represents Nipissing University in the Ontario University Athletics (OUA) conference of U Sports. The Lakers first competed in OUA women's ice hockey in the 2013-14 season and qualified for the OUA playoffs in their second season. The team has played in three McCaw Cup finals and in two U Sports national tournaments, in 2022 and 2023. The team is led by head coach Darren Turcotte, a former NHL forward and North Bay Sports Hall of Fame member.

== History ==
Nipissing Lakers women's ice hockey players in 2026.

Prior to their entry to U Sports (formerly Canadian Interuniversity Sport), the Lakers had fielded a women's ice hockey team that played in the Ontario Colleges Athletic Association. On June 26, 2012, it was announced that the women's ice hockey team would compete in Ontario University Athletics beginning with the 2013-14 season. After conducting a search for a head coach for the team's first foray into the OUA, it was announced on August 16, 2012, that Darren Turcotte had been hired for the position for the 2013-14 season. The Nipissing Lakers advanced to the U Sports National Championship for the first time in 2022, where they returned to North Bay as National Silver Medalists.

=== OUA results ===
Year	GP	W	OTW	L	OTL	P	Standing	Postseason
2013-14	24	5	0	17	2	12	12th in OUA	Did not qualify for playoffs
2014-15	24	6	6	9	3	27	7th in OUA	Lost OUA Quarter-Final vs. Western (0–2 series)
2015-16	24	12	1	6	5	44	5th in OUA	Won OUA Quarter-Final vs. Queen's (2–0 series); Lost OUA Semi-Final vs. Western (1–2 series)
2016-17	24	15	2	5	2	51	2nd in OUA	Won OUA Quarter-Final vs. Laurentian (2–1 series); Won OUA Semi-Final vs. Toronto (2–0 series); Lost McCaw Cup Championship (6–1) vs. Guelph
2017-18	24	15	1	6	2	47	4th in OUA	Won OUA Quarter-Final vs. Ryerson (2–1 series); Lost OUA Semi-Final vs. Queen's (0–2 series)
2018-19	24	11	3	7	3	40	6th in OUA	Lost OUA Quarter-Final vs. Toronto (1–2 series)
2019-20	24	16	0	7	1	47	2nd in OUA	Won OUA Quarter-Final vs. Queen's (2–0 series); Lost OUA Semi-Final vs. York (0–2 series)
2020-21	Cancelled due to the COVID-19 pandemic							
2021-22	14	8	2	4	0	28	4th in OUA	Won OUA Quarter-Final (3–1) vs. Ryerson; Won OUA Semi-Final (3–2) vs. Toronto; Lost McCaw Cup Championship (1–2) vs. Brock
2022-23	26	14	5	4	3	55	4th in OUA	Won OUA Quarter-Final vs. Queen's (2–0 series); Won OUA Semi-Final vs. Waterloo (2–0 series); Lost McCaw Cup Championship (1–2) vs. Toronto
2023-24	24	16	6	2	4	62	2nd in OUA	Lost OUA Quarter-Final vs. York (0–2 series)

=== U Sports Tournament results ===
Year	Seed	Round	Opponent	Result
2022	#6	First Round; Semi-Finals; Gold Medal Game	#3 UBC Thunderbirds #2 UNB Reds #1 Concordia Stingers	W 1–0; W 4–0; L 4-0
2023	#6	First Round; Consolation Semi-Finals	#3 Concordia Stingers #7 St. Francis Xavier X-Women	L 5–1; L 7–3

=== 705 Challenge Cup ===
First established as a challenge between the varsity soccer teams of two Northern Ontario universities (Laurentian vs. Nipissing), in which the winning team was awarded the Riley Gallo Cup, the rivalry expanded. Introducing the 705 Challenge Cup in 2016, the results of all regular season games between the Lakers and the Voyageurs varsity teams for men’s and women’s basketball, ice hockey and soccer, comprised the overall won-loss record in determining the annual Cup winner. The Lakers would win their first 705 Challenge Cup during the 2019-20 athletics season. Of note, the scores below reflect the women's ice hockey matchups since the 705 Challenge Cup was introduced. The series ended following the discontinuation of the Laurentian Voyageurs women's ice hockey team in 2021.

Nipissing victories	Laurentian victories	Tie games

No.	Date	Location	Winning team		Losing team	
1	November 12, 2016	Sudbury	Nipissing	4	Laurentian	1
2	November 26, 2016	North Bay	Nipissing	3	Laurentian	2
3	October 28, 2017	Sudbury	Nipissing	3	Laurentian	0
4	January 27, 2018	North Bay	Nipissing	7	Laurentian	1
5	November 2, 2018	North Bay	Laurentian	2	Nipissing	1
6	November 25, 2018	Sudbury	Nipissing	4	Laurentian	2
7	October 17, 2019	Sudbury	Nipissing	3	Laurentian	1
8	January 11, 2020	North Bay	Nipissing	4	Laurentian	0
Series: Nipissing leads 7–1

=== Team captains ===
- 2015-16: Carly Marchment
- 2016-17: Kaley Tienhaara
- 2017-18: Kaley Tienhaara and Jackie Rochefort (Co-captains), Zosia Davis and Brooklyn Irwin, (assistant captains)
- 2018-19: Kaley Tienhaara
- 2019-20: Jetta Derenoski (captain), Ava Keis, Katelyn Heppner, Madison Solie and Danika Ranger (assistant captains)
- 2021-22: Katelyn Heppner (captain), Madison Solie, Madison Laberge, Maggie McKee and Brianna Gaffney (assistant captains).
- 2022-23: Ally Hayhurst (captain), Madison Laberge, Maggie McKee, Maria Dominico and Katie Chomiak (assistant captains).
- 2023-24: Ally Hayhurst (captain), Madison Laberge, Maggie McKee, Ashley Taciuk and Katie Chomiak (assistant captains).
- 2024-25: Ally Hayhurst (captain), Madison Laberge, Maggie McKee, and Ashley Taciuk (assistant captains).

== International ==
- Danika Ranger, Goaltender Canada: 2017 IIHF World Women's U18 Championship (silver)
- Katelyn Heppner, Defence 2021-22 FISU Games Team Canada (event cancelled due to COVID-19)
- Maria Dominico, Forward 2021-22 FISU Games Team Canada (event cancelled due to COVID-19)
- Marilyn Fortin, Forward 2021-22 FISU Games Team Switzerland (event cancelled due to COVID-19)
- Madison Desmarais, Forward Canada: Ice hockey at the 2025 Winter World University Games (silver)
- Mallory Domenico, Forward Canada: Ice hockey at the 2025 Winter World University Games (silver)

== Awards and honours ==
- Jackie Rochefort, 2016 Nipissing Lakers Athletics Female Athlete of the Year
- Maria Dominico, 2022 Nipissing Lakers Athletics Female Athlete of the Year

=== OUA honours ===
- Maria Dominico, 2017-18 OUA Rookie of the Year
- Zosia Davis, 2017-18 OUA Defensive Player of the Year
- Malory Dominico, 2019-20 OUA Rookie of the Year
- Maria Dominico, 2021-22 OUA East Player of the Year

==== OUA All-Stars ====
- Jacquline Rochefort, 2016-17 OUA Second Team All-Star
- Maria Dominico, 2019-20 OUA Second Team All-Star
- Katelyn Heppner, 2019-20 OUA Second Team All-Star
- Maria Dominico, 2021-22 OUA First Team All-Star
- Madison Laberge, 2021-22 OUA First Team All-Star
- Brianna Gaffney, 2021-22 OUA Second Team All-Star

=== OUA All-Rookie ===
- Malory Dominico, 2019-20 OUA All-Rookie
- Allison Hayhurst, 2019-20 OUA All-Rookie
- Maggie McKee, 2019-20 OUA All-Rookie
- Katie Chomiak, 2021-22 OUA All-Rookie Team

==== U Sports All Canadians ====
- Maria Dominico, 2021-22 U Sports First Team All Canadian

==== U Sports Performers of the Game ====
- Chloe Marshall, 2021-22 Quarter-Finals vs UBC (1-0 win)
- Ashlyn Zaharia, 2021-22 Semi-Finals vs UNB (4-0 win)
- Maria Dominico, 2021-22 Finals vs Concordia (4-0 loss)

==== U Sports Championship All-Star Team ====
- Madison Solie, 2021-22 U Sports All-Star Team (defence)
- Maria Dominico, 2021-22 U Sports All-Star Team (forward)
