= Karolina Urban =

Ice hockey player

- Born: December 16, 1989 (age 36) Wrocław, Poland
- Height: 5 ft 6 in (168 cm)
- Weight: 132 lb (60 kg; 9 st 6 lb)
- Position: Forward
- Shoots: Left
- Played for: Toronto Furies; Calgary Inferno; Markham Thunder
- Playing career: 2007–present
Medal record
Women's street hockey
Representing Canada
ISBHF Women World Championships
Gold medal – first place	2015 Switzerland

Karolina Urban (born December 16, 1989) is a Canadian ice hockey and street (ball) hockey player. Selected by the Toronto Furies in the 2012 CWHL Draft, she was also a member of the Canada women's national ball hockey team that won a gold medal at the International Street and Ball Hockey Federation (ISBHF) 2015 Women's World Championships in Zug, Switzerland. Urban also played with the Markham Thunder in the 2017–18 CWHL season, winning the Clarkson Cup with the team.

== Playing career ==
Born in Poland, Urban's family emigrated to Canada when she was four years old. Raised in Kamloops, British Columbia, Urban played both soccer and ice hockey during her high school years. Winning a gold medal in ice hockey at the 2006 British Columbia Winter Games, Urban was named to the provincial team that competed at the 2007 Canada Winter Games in Whitehorse, Yukon.

=== CIS ===
Having joined the Toronto Varsity Blues women's ice hockey program in autumn 2007, Urban played for head coach (and former Winter Games gold medalist) Vicky Sunohara from 2010 to 2012. In her final three seasons, Urban served as team captain and finished top ten all time in points.

On January 4, 2010, Urban notched four points in one game versus the Guelph Gryphons. Urban was only the fifth player in Lady Blues history to be a three-time captain. In her rookie year, the Blues finished with Ontario University Athletics (OUA) silver falling to Laurier in a best-of-three OUA final. She helped the Varsity Blues jump from a sixth-place finish in the OUA in 2010–11 to a third-place finish the following year. In addition, the Blues finished tenth in the national rankings. Statistically, she recorded 41 goals and 46 assists, for a U Sports career total of 85 points.

In her final season with the Varsity Blues, Urban was a nominee for the 2012 University of Toronto Female Athlete of the Year Award.

=== CWHL ===
Selected by the Toronto Furies in the 5th round of the 2012 CWHL Draft, Urban would play one season (2012–13) for the Furies. Wearing number 67, Urban made her debut on October 20, 2012 against the Brampton Thunder.

A 4-1 home win on November 18, 2012 saw Urban log the first assist and goal in her CWHL career, subsequently logging the first multi-point game in her career. She would earn an assist on the first goal of the game, scored by Shannon Moulson. In the third period, Urban would score at the 18:19 mark, with Kristy Zamora gaining credit for the assist.

The following season, Urban joined the Calgary Inferno, helping the squad qualify for the postseason for the first time in franchise history. With the Inferno, Urban registered an assist on January 19, 2014. Along with Laura Dostaler, the two assisted on Erin Duggan’s first-period goal, part of a 5–1 win against the Brampton Thunder.

After taking a short break from the CWHL, Karolina was signed as a free agent with the Markham Thunder for the 2017-2018 inaugural season. The Markham Thunder went on to win the Clarkson Cup after upsetting the Montreal Les Cannadiennes in the first round and beating the Kunlun Red Star 2-1.

=== Europe ===
At the 2014 European Women’s Champions Cup, Urban competed with Kazakh team Aisulu Almaty. In the second round of Group G play, Urban accumulated three points.

For the 2015–16 women’s ice hockey season, Urban joined the Aisulu Almaty women’s ice hockey team, competing in the European Women’s Hockey League. She was one of three Canadians on the roster, joining Rayne Cruickshank and Chelsea Purcell. Urban and Purcell had previously been teammates on the Calgary Inferno during the 2013–14 CWHL season.

=== Ball hockey ===
As a member of the Canada women's national ball hockey team, Urban played in seven games. The Canadian team went on to capture the gold medal, posting an undefeated mark.

Urban’s first appearance for Canada in the tournament was a 10-0 win against Italy on June 22. A 9–1 win against Switzerland on June 24 saw Urban and Chelsea Purcell both gain the assist on a goal scored by April Drake. In the semifinals, Urban and Drake would both log assists on a goal scored by Purcell, Canada's second of the game.

== Career stats ==
Season	Team	League	GP	G	A	Pts	+/-	PIM
2007-08	Toronto Varsity Blues	OUA	26	12	3	15		24
2008–09	Toronto Varsity Blues	OUA	27	8	8	16		16
2009–10	Toronto Varsity Blues	OUA	27	10	18	28		26
2010–11	Toronto Varsity Blues	OUA	27	5	9	14		34
2011–12	Toronto Varsity Blues	OUA	26	5	8	13		24
2012-13	Toronto Furies	CWHL	23	2	1	3	+1	0
2013-14	Calgary Inferno	CWHL	23	0	1	1	-16	24
2014–15	Aisulu Almaty	EWHL	3	1	1	2	4	2
2015–16	Aisulu Almaty	EWHL	20	5	4	9	+7	16

== Personal ==
Urban became a Canadian citizen in 1998.

In 2012, Urban graduated from the University of Toronto with a Bachelor of Physical Health and Education in Kinesiology and Exercise Science. Urban would also earn a Master of Science (MSc) in Neuroscience at the University of Calgary in 2014. She completed her Doctor of Philosophy (PhD) in Rehabilitation Science at the University of Toronto.
