= Mount Royal Cougars women's ice hockey =

Canadian university ice hockey team

- University: Mount Royal University
- Conference: Canada West
- Head coach: Scott Rivett; Since 2012-13 season
- Assistant coaches: Lauren Williams, Kelsey Leifson
- Arena: Flames Community Arena; Calgary, Alberta
- Colors: Kerby Blue, Historic Silver, and White

U Sports tournament champions
- 2023

U Sports tournament appearances
- 2020, 2023

Conference regular season champions
- (as part of Alberta Colleges Athletics Conference): 2003, 2004, 2005, 2010, 2012

The Mount Royal Cougars women's ice hockey program represents Mount Royal University in Calgary, Alberta in the sport of ice hockey in the Canada West Universities Athletic Association conference of U Sports. The Cougars have won one national championship, in 2023. Prior to joining Canada West, the Cougars were a member of the Alberta Colleges Athletics Conference, winning five conference championships.

== History ==
The Cougars women's ice hockey program first began play for the 2001–02 season and won five conference titles in their 11 years in the Alberta Colleges Athletics Conference. The team plays home games at the Flames Community Arena. After seeing initial challenges upon moving to the Canada West conference of CIS, the Cougars first qualified for the playoffs in 2017 where they lost in a quarterfinal sweep to the Manitoba Bisons. The team won their first playoffs series in 2020 after defeating the Saskatchewan Huskies in the quarter-final and then went on to beat the Calgary Dinos in the semi-final before losing the Canada West final to the Alberta Pandas. As a conference finalist, the Cougars qualified for their first U Sports women's ice hockey championship tournament in 2020 and won their opening game, but the remainder of the tournament was cancelled due to the COVID-19 pandemic in Canada. The Cougars won the 2023 U Sports Women's Ice Hockey Championship as the 8-seed in the tournament, capturing their first national title.

== National championships ==
Year	Winner	Score	Runner-up
2023	Mount Royal Cougars	4–3 (OT)	Concordia Stingers

=== U Sports Tournament results ===
Year	Seed	Round	Opponent	Result
2020	#7	First Round; Semi-Finals	#2 Toronto #3 SFX	W 2–1; Cancelled
2023	#8	First Round; Semi-Finals; Gold Medal Game	#1 Toronto #5 Montréal #3 Concordia	W 3–2; W 3–1; W 4–3

=== Canada West awards ===
Season	Award	Winner
2018–19	Canada West Rookie of the Year	Breanne Trotter
2021–22	Canada West Most Valuable Player	Tianna Ko
2021–22	Canada West Goaltender of the Year	Zoe DeBeauville
2021–22	Canada West Coach of the Year	Scott Rivett
2022–23	Canada West Most Valuable Player	Tatum Amy
2022–23	Canada West Defencemen of the Year	Emma Bergesen
2023–24	Canada West Defencemen of the Year	Emma Bergesen
2023–24	Canada West Coach of the Year	Scott Rivett
2025–26	Canada West Rookie of the Year	Isa MacPhee

==== Canada West All-Stars ====
- Summer Fomradas, 2025-26 Canada West First Team All-Star
- Allee Gerrard, 2025-26 Canada West Second Team All-Star
- Aliya Jomha, 2024-25 Canada West First Team All-Star
- Alex Spence, 2024-25 Canada West First Team All-Star
- Kaitlyn Ross, 2024-25 Canada West Second Team All-Star
- Emma Bergesen, 2023-24 Canada West First Team All-Star
- Emma Bergesen, 2022-23 Canada West First Team All-Star
- Tatum Amy, 2022-23 Canada West First Team All-Star
- Courtney Kollman, 2022-23 Canada West Second Team All-Star
- Zoe DeBeauville, 2021-22 Canada West First Team All-Star
- Tianna Ko, 2021-22 Canada West First Team All-Star
- Mackenzie Butz, 2021-22 Canada West First Team All-Star
- Courtney Kollman, 2021-22 Canada West Second Team All-Star
- Anna Purschke, 2019-20 Canada West Second Team All-Star
- Tatum Amy, 2018-19 Canada West Second Team All-Star

== Cougars in professional hockey ==
As of August 2025

= PWHL All-Star	= PWHL Champion

Player	Position	Team(s)	League(s)	Years	Titles
Emma Bergesen	Defence	Ottawa Charge	PWHL	1	

=== International ===
- Kaitlyn Ross, Goaltender, Canada: Ice hockey at the 2025 Winter World University Games (silver)
- Alex Spence, Defense, Canada: Ice hockey at the 2025 Winter World University Games (silver)
- Aliya Jomha, Forward, Canada: Ice hockey at the 2025 Winter World University Games (silver)
