= UPEI Panthers women's ice hockey =

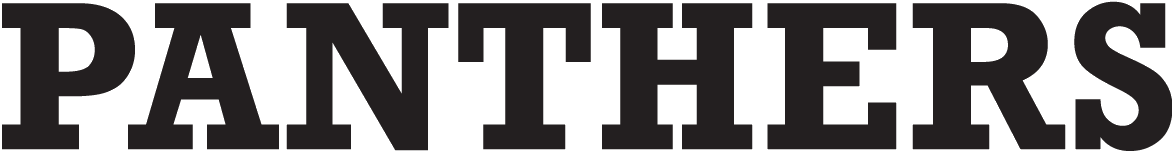
- University: University of Prince Edward Island
- Conference: AUS
- Governing Body: U Sports
- Head coach: Bruce Donaldson
- Arena: MacLauchlan Arena; Charlottetown, Prince Edward Island
- Colors: Green and black

U Sports tournament appearances
- 2012, 2019, 2020, 2022

Conference tournament champions
- 2012

The UPEI Panthers women's ice hockey program represent the University of Prince Edward Island in the Atlantic University Sport (AUS) conference. The Panthers have won one AUS conference championship and have qualified for four U Sports women's ice hockey championship tournaments. They have served as the host team for the 2019 U Sports Women's Ice Hockey Championship, 2020 U Sports Women's Ice Hockey Championship, and the 2022 U Sports Women's Ice Hockey Championship, although the 2020 tournament was cancelled due to the COVID-19 pandemic in Canada. Despite being cancelled after one day, the 2020 event was named the SCORE! Event of the Year by PEI Amateur Sport.

== History ==
=== Individual Leader Scoring ===
Season	Player	GP	G	A	PTS	PIM	+/-	AUS rank
2019-20	Jolena Gillard	28	10	10	20	12	+15	13th
2018-19	Rachel Colle	28	10	10	20	10	+6	9th

=== Team captains ===
- 2017-18: Emma Martin
- 2020-21: Kaylee Dufresne
- 2024-25: Chloe McCabe
- 2025-26: Chloe McCabe

=== U Sports Tournament results ===
Year	Seed	Round	Opponent	Result
2012	#4	Pool A, Game #1; Pool A, Game #2; 5th Place Game	#1 Laurier #6 Montreal #5 Alberta	L 3–0; L 4–1; L 1–0
2019	#7	Quarter-Finals; Consolation Semi-Finals	#2 Montreal #6 Manitoba	L 3–0; L 3–1
2020	#8	Tournament cancelled due to COVID-19 pandemic.		
2022	#8	Quarter-Finals; Consolation Semi-Finals; Consolation Finals	#1 Concordia #4 Brock #3 UBC	L 7–0; W 2–0; L 4–0

== International ==
- Keirsten Visser Canada: 2015 Winter Universiade

== Awards and honours ==
- Nancy Macmillan: 2019 Hockey Canada Female Breathrough Award (recognizing an Outstanding contribution to advancing female hockey)

=== AUS Awards ===
- 2011-12: Bruce Donaldson, AUS Coach of the Year
- 2013-14: Ferran Brown, AUS Student-Athlete Community Service Award
- 2016-17: Sydnee Baker, AUS Rookie of the Year

==== AUS All-Stars ====
- Marie-Soleil Deschenes, 2016-17 AUS First Team All-Star
- 2016-17 AUS Second Team All-Stars: Emma Martin, UPEI
- Camille Scherger, 2019-20 AUS First Team All-Star
- Jolena Gillard, 2019-20 AUS Second Team All-Star
- Brianna MacNeil, 2025-26 AUS First Team All-Star

==== AUS All-Rookie ====
- Jolena Gillard, 2018-19 AUS All-Rookie Team
- Lexie Murphy, 2019-20 AUS All-Rookie Team
- Kali MacDonald, 2025-26 AUS All-Rookie Team

=== USports Awards ===
- Camille Scherger, Goaltender, 2019-20 USports Second Team All-Canadian
- Jolena Gillard, Forward, 2021-22 USports Second Team All-Canadian

=== Team Awards ===
- 2017-18 Gordon and Muriel Bennett Award (in recognition of best combined athletic achievement and academic excellence during four years): Emma Martin

Most Valuable Player

- Kristy Dobson, 2011-12 UPEI Women's Ice Hockey Most Valuable Player
- Jaimelynn Donaldson: 2012-13
- Samantha Sweet: 2014-15
- Samantha Sweet : 2015-16
- Marie-Soleil Deschenes, 2016–17
- Camille Scherger, 2018-19
- Camille Scherger, 2019–20
- Jolena Gillard, 2021–22

Rookie of the Year

- Laura Bradley, 2011-12 UPEI Women's Ice Hockey Rookie of the Year
- Marie Soleil Deschenes: 2012-13
- Emma Weatherbie: 2014-15
- Sydnee Baker, 2016–17
- Jolena Gillard: 2018-19
- Lexie Murphy, 2019–20

Coaches Award

- Alicia Betts, 2011-12 UPEI Women's Ice Hockey Coaches Award
- Kaylee Dufresne, 2019-20 Principles of Panther Pride Coaches Award
  (presented by each coach to the student-athlete on their team that best exemplifies purpose, preparation, respect for people, positivity, professionalism, presence, passion, and perseverance)

=== University Awards ===
- 2012 UPEI Panthers Rookie of the Year Award (Female): Laura Bradley
- Marie-Soleil Deschenes, 2016-17 UPEI Female Athlete of the Year
- Rachel Colle, 2019-20 PEI Panthers Athletics Passion for Life Award (Presented to a UPEI student-athlete who exemplifies his/her qualities and love of life by building Panther Sport spirit and serving the community)

==== Panther Athlete of the Week ====
- Sophie Vandale: Panther Subway Athletes of the Week, February 3 to 9, 2020
- Kaylee Dufresne, Panther Subway Athletes of the Week, January 27 to February 2, 2020

==== J.T. "Mickey" Place Award ====
Presented by the UPEI Student Union, the J.T. "Mickey" Place Award is awarded to varsity team student-athletes who made a contribution to student leadership on their team and on campus.

- Amber Gaudette 2011-12 J.T "Mickey" Place Awards
- Ferran Brown, 2012-13 J.T "Mickey" Place Awards
- Ferran Brown, 2014-15 J.T "Mickey" Place Awards
- 2016 J.T. “Mickey” Place Awards : Teagan Pringle
- Teagan Pringle, 2016-17 J.T "Mickey" Place Awards
- Annabelle Charron and Rachel Colle, 2019-20 J.T "Mickey" Place Awards

== See also ==
UPEI Panthers men's ice hockey
