= Chihiro Suzuki (disambiguation) =

Chihiro Suzuki (鈴木 千尋; born 1977) is a Japanese voice actor and singer.

Chihiro Suzuki may also refer to:

- Chihiro Suzuki (fighter) (鈴木 千裕; born 1999), Japanese kickboxer and mixed martial artist
- Chihiro Suzuki (ice hockey) (鈴木 千尋; born 2002), Japanese ice hockey player
