= 2022 U Sports Women's Ice Hockey Championship =

- Season: 2021–22
- Teams: Eight
- Finals site: MacLauchlan Arena; Charlottetown, P.E.I.
- Champions: Concordia Stingers (3rd title)
- Runner-up: Nipissing Lakers
- Winning coach: Julie Chu (1st title)
- Championship MVP: Stéphanie Lalancette (Concordia)
- Television: CBC Sports

The 2022 U Sports Women's Ice Hockey Championship was held March 24–27, 2022, in Charlottetown, P.E.I., to determine a national champion for the 2021–22 U Sports women's ice hockey season. The top-seeded Concordia Stingers defeated the sixth-seeded Nipissing Lakers to win the third championship in program history and first since the back-to-back titles in 1998 and 1999. The Stingers did not allow a goal during the tournament with three straight shutouts and all but one of the 11 games featured a shutout.

== Host ==
The tournament was played at MacLauchlan Arena at the University of Prince Edward Island. It is the second consecutive tournament to be hosted by UPEI, as well as their second time hosting overall. This was the first U Sports women's ice hockey championship played since 2019 following two years of cancelled tournaments due to the COVID-19 pandemic in Canada.

== Participating teams ==
Seed	Team	Qualified	Record	Last	Total
1	Concordia Stingers	RSEQ Champion	11–3–1	1999	2
2	UNB Reds	AUS Champion	15–3–3	None	0
3	UBC Thunderbirds	Canada West Champion	14–6–2	None	0
4	Brock Badgers	OUA Champion	5–2–4–5	None	0
5	Saskatchewan Huskies	Canada West Finalist	11–7–2	None	0
6	Nipissing Lakers	OUA Finalist	8–2–0–4	None	0
7	McGill Martlets	RSEQ Finalist	12–3–0	2014	4
8	UPEI Panthers	AUS Quarterfinalist (Host)	13–7–2	None	0

== Championship bracket ==
First Round: March 24/25
1	Concordia Stingers	7
8	UPEI Panthers	0
4	Brock Badgers	0
5	Saskatchewan Huskies	4
2	UNB Reds	5
7	McGill Martlets	4
3	UBC Thunderbirds	0
6	Nipissing Lakers	1

Semi-Finals: March 26
1	Concordia Stingers	2
5	Saskatchewan Huskies	0
2	UNB Reds	0
6	Nipissing Lakers	4

Gold Medal Game: March 27
1	Concordia Stingers	4
6	Nipissing Lakers	0
Bronze Medal Game: March 27
2	UNB Reds	0
5	Saskatchewan Huskies	2

== Consolation bracket ==
Semi-Finals: March 26
3	UBC Thunderbirds	4
7	McGill Martlets	0
4	Brock Badgers	0
8	UPEI Panthers	2

Fifth Place Game: March 27
3	UBC Thunderbirds	4
8	UPEI Panthers	0
