= 2027 U Sports Women's Ice Hockey Championship =

Canadian university ice hockey championship

- Season: 2026–27
- Teams: Eight
- Finals site: Aitken Centre; Fredericton, New Brunswick

The 2027 U Sports Women's Ice Hockey Championship is scheduled to be held in March 2027, in Fredericton, New Brunswick, to determine a national champion for the 2026–27 U Sports women's ice hockey season. The tournament will be hosted by the UNB Reds.

== Host ==
The tournament is scheduled to be played at the Aitken Centre in Fredericton, New Brunswick. This is scheduled to be the first time that the University of New Brunswick will host the tournament.

== Scheduled teams ==
- Canada West Representative
- OUA Representative
- RSEQ Representative
- AUS Representative
- Host (UNB Reds)
- Three additional berths
