= Lesley Reddon =

Canadian ice hockey player

- Born: November 15, 1970 (age 55) North York, Ontario, Canada
- Height: 5 ft 9 in (175 cm)
- Weight: 130 lb (59 kg; 9 st 4 lb)
- Position: Goaltender
- Caught: Left
- Independent CIAU WWHL team: Maritime Sports Blades; Toronto Lady Blues; Strathmore Rockies
- National team: Canada
- Playing career: 1989–1998
Medal record
Representing Canada
Women's ice hockey
Olympic Games
Silver medal – second place	1998 Nagano	Tournament
IIHF World Women's Championships
Gold medal – first place	1994 United States	Tournament
Gold medal – first place	1997 Canada	Tournament
Women's Pacific Rim Championships
Gold medal – first place	1995 United States

Lesley Joanne Reddon (born November 15, 1970) is a retired goaltender who played for the Canadian national women's ice hockey team from 1993 to 1998, including at the 1998 Winter Olympics. She was born in North York, Ontario.

== Playing career ==
=== CIAU ===
Reddon started playing hockey in 1976 with the Mississauga Girls Hockey League. As a 13-year-old, Reddon participated for the Mississauga Peewee All-Star team that won the 1982–83 Ontario girls championship. Reddon played on the University of Toronto Lady Blues women's hockey team from 1989 to 1993. The Lady Blues won Ontario University Athletics provincial titles every season. In 1993, Reddon attended the University of New Brunswick to pursue a master's degree. She was part of the UNB Varsity Reds men's ice hockey team and became the first female goaltender ever to play in the AUS.

=== Hockey Canada ===
She won a gold medal for Canada at the 1994 Women's World Ice Hockey championships. She was the backup to Manon Rhéaume. In 1995 and 1996, Reddon competed for the Maritime Sports Blades in the Canadian National Women's Championships. Although the team did not win the Abby Hoffman Cup, they won silver in 1995 and bronze in 1996. The following year, she would share goaltending duties with Danielle Dube as Canada won the 1997 Women's World Ice Hockey championships. Her last appearance with the national team was at the 1998 Winter Olympics. She was part of the first ever women's ice hockey tournament in Olympic hockey and she won a silver medal. In 2006, Reddon would be a staff member with the Canadian women's delegation to the 2006 Winter Olympics. Reddon was also a member of the women's delegation for the 2009–10 Hockey Canada national women's team that participated in ice hockey at the 2010 Winter Olympics.

== Other ==
Reddon was a member of the Maritime Sports Blades and competed in three National Championships. Reddon was part of the Blades team which won a silver in 1995, and a bronze in 1996 In the winter of 1997, Reddon took a position with the Fredericton Canadiens of the American Hockey League in marketing and promotions. She was a goaltender in the inaugural season of the Strathmore Rockies of the Western Women's Hockey League in 2008–2009. She was inducted into the Mississauga Sports Hall of Fame in 2006. She was appointed Team Manager for Canada's entry at the 2010 Four Nations Cup.

== Career statistics ==
Year	Team	Event	Result	GP	W	L	T/OT	MIN	GA	SO	GAA	SV%
1994	Canada	WC	1st place, gold medalist(s)	2	-	-	-	91:00	1	-	0.66	0.933
1998	Canada	OG	2nd place, silver medalist(s)	3	2	1	0	150:56	9	0	3.58	0.781

== Awards and honours ==
- 1997 Four Nations Cup, All-Star selection
- 1992–93 Ontario University Athletics women's ice hockey First Team All-Star
- 1991–92 Ontario University Athletics Second Team All-Star
- 1990–91 Ontario University Athletics women's ice hockey First Team All-Star
- 1989–90 Ontario University Athletics Second Team All-Star
