= 2023 U Sports Women's Ice Hockey Championship =

Canadian university ice hockey championship

- Season: 2022–23
- Teams: Eight
- Finals site: CEPSUM; Montreal, Quebec
- Champions: Mount Royal Cougars (1st title)
- Runner-up: Concordia Stingers
- Winning coach: Scott Rivett (1st title)
- Tournament MVP: Kaitlyn Ross (Mount Royal)
- Television: CBC Sports

The 2023 U Sports Women's Ice Hockey Championship was held March 16–19, 2023, in Montreal, Quebec, to determine a national champion for the 2022–23 U Sports women's ice hockey season. The eighth-seeded Mount Royal Cougars defeated the defending champion Concordia Stingers by a score of 4–3 in overtime to win the program's first national title.

== Host ==
The tournament was played at CEPSUM on the campus of at the Université de Montréal. This was the first time that the Université de Montréal had hosted the tournament. The Montreal Carabins were originally supposed to host the 2021 championship, but that tournament was cancelled due to the COVID-19 pandemic in Canada.

== Participating teams ==
Seed	Team	Qualified	Record	Last	Total
1	Toronto Varsity Blues	OUA Champion	22–1–2–2	2001	1
2	UBC Thunderbirds	Canada West Champion	24–2–2	None	0
3	Concordia Stingers	RSEQ Champion	20–4–1	2022	3
4	UNB Reds	AUS Champion	23–2–3	None	0
5	Montreal Carabins	RSEQ Finalist (Host)	17–4–4	2016	2
6	Nipissing Lakers	OUA Finalist	14–5–3–4	None	0
7	St. Francis Xavier X-Women	AUS Finalist	20–5–3	None	0
8	Mount Royal Cougars	Canada West Finalist	19–6–3	None	0

== Championship bracket ==
First Round: March 16/17
1	Toronto Varsity Blues	2
8	Mount Royal Cougars	3
4	UNB Reds	1
5	Montreal Carabins	4
2	UBC Thunderbirds	3
7	St. Francis Xavier X-Women	2
3	Concordia Stingers	5
6	Nipissing Lakers	1

Semi-Finals: March 18
5	Montreal Carabins	1
8	Mount Royal Cougars	3
2	UBC Thunderbirds	1
3	Concordia Stingers	3

Gold Medal Game: March 19
3	Concordia Stingers	3
8	Mount Royal Cougars	4
Bronze Medal Game: March 19
2	UBC Thunderbirds	3
5	Montreal Carabins	2

== Consolation bracket ==
Semi-Finals: March 18
1	Toronto Varsity Blues	4
4	UNB Reds	1
6	Nipissing Lakers	3
7	St. Francis Xavier X-Women	7

Fifth Place Game: March 19
1	Toronto Varsity Blues	4
7	St. Francis Xavier X-Women	0
