= 2021 U Sports Women's Ice Hockey Championship =

Canadian university ice hockey championship

- Season: 2020–21
- Teams: Eight
- Finals site: CEPSUM Arena; Montreal, Quebec
- Champions: No champion

The 2021 U Sports Women's Ice Hockey Championship was scheduled to be held March 18–21, 2021, in Montreal, Quebec, to determine a national champion for the 2020–21 U Sports women's ice hockey season. However, the due to the ongoing COVID-19 pandemic in Canada, it was announced on October 15, 2020, that the tournament was cancelled. It was the second consecutive year that the national championship was cancelled due to the pandemic.

== Host ==
The tournament was scheduled to be played at CEPSUM Arena at the Université de Montréal. It would have been the first time that Montréal had hosted the tournament and it would have been the tenth anniversary of the debut of the Montreal Carabins women's ice hockey program which occurred in 2009. Instead, the Carabins were awarded hosting duties for the 2023 tournament.
