= Laurentian Voyageurs women's ice hockey =

Laurentian Voyageurs women's ice hockey program

- University: Laurentian University
- Conference: OUA
- Governing Body: U Sports
- First season: 2014–15
- Head coach: Stacey Colarossi
- Arena: Sudbury
- Colors: Gold and blue

The Laurentian Voyageurs women's ice hockey program represents Laurentian University in the Ontario University Athletics women's ice hockey conference of U Sports. Also known as the Lady Vees.

Following the cancellation of the 2020–21 season, the Laurentian Voyageurs discontinued their women's ice hockey program in 2021.

== History ==
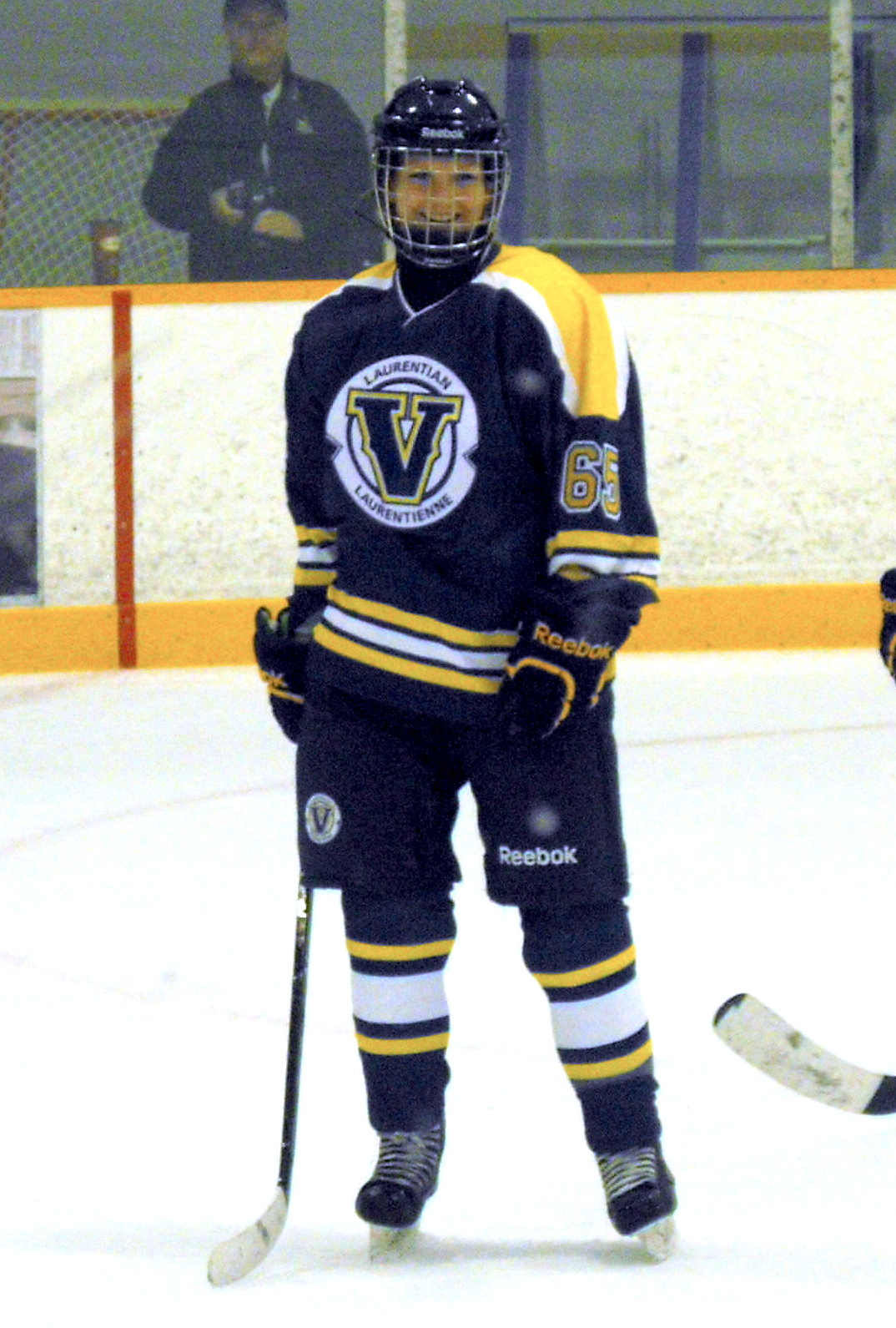
Voyageurs' women's hockey team 2013–14

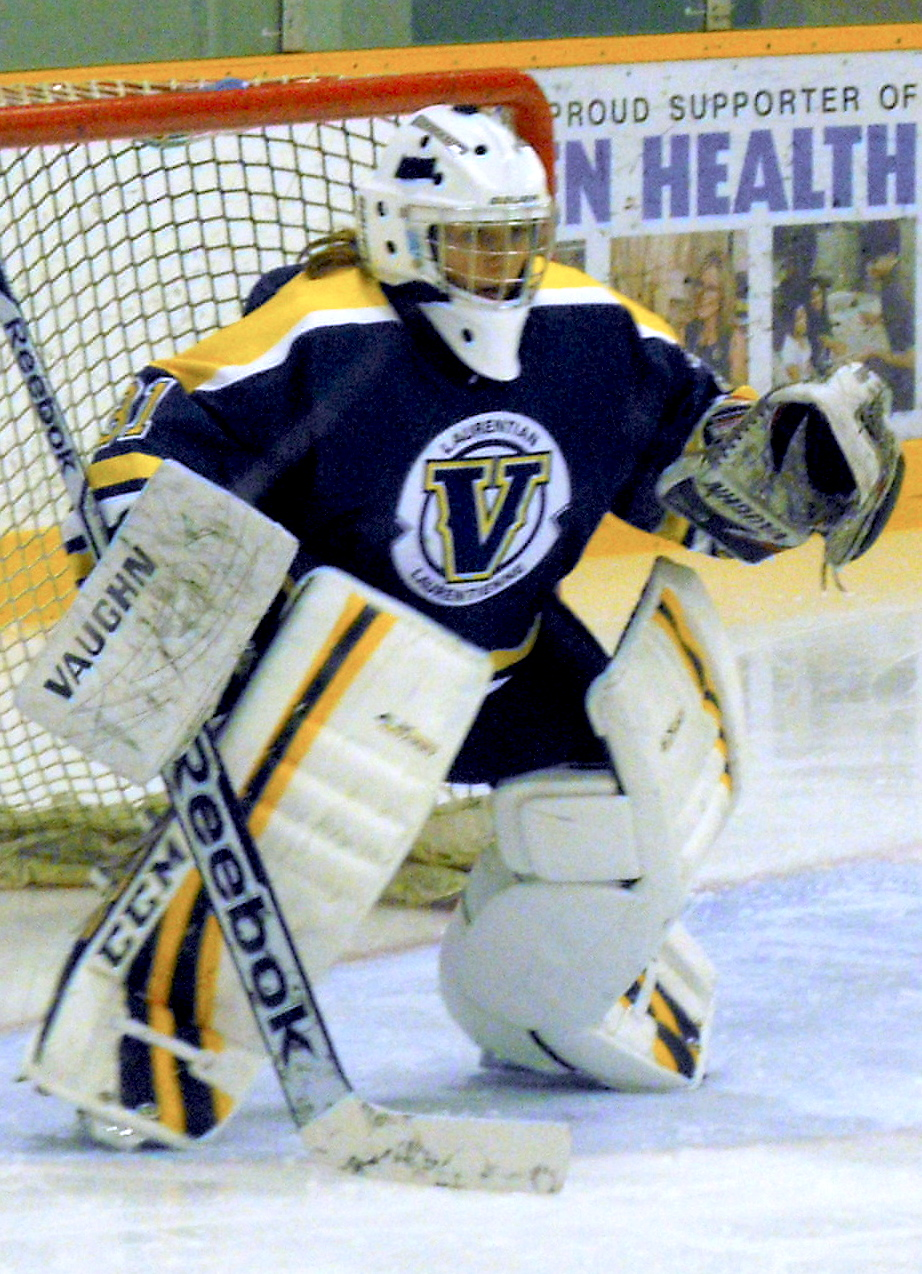
Voyageurs' women's hockey team 2013–14

=== 705 Challenge Cup ===
First established as a challenge between the varsity soccer teams of two Northern Ontario universities (Laurentian vs. Nipissing), in which the winning team was awarded the Riley Gallo Cup, the rivalry expanded. Introducing the 705 Challenge Cup in 2016, the results of all regular season games between the Lakers and the Voyageurs varsity teams for men’s and women’s basketball, ice hockey and soccer, comprised the overall won-loss record in determining the annual Cup winner. The Lakers would win their first 705 Challenge Cup during the 2019-20 athletics season. Of note, the scores below reflect the women's ice hockey matchups since the 705 Challenge Cup was introduced.

Nipissing victories	Laurentian victories	Tie games

No.	Date	Location	Winning team		Losing team	
1	November 12, 2016	Sudbury	Nipissing	4	Laurentian	1
2	November 26, 2016	North Bay	Nipissing	3	Laurentian	2
3	October 28, 2017	Sudbury	Nipissing	3	Laurentian	0
4	January 27, 2018	North Bay	Nipissing	7	Laurentian	1
5	November 2, 2018	North Bay	Laurentian	2	Nipissing	1
6	November 25, 2018	Sudbury	Nipissing	4	Laurentian	2
7	October 17, 2019	Sudbury	Nipissing	3	Laurentian	1
8	January 11, 2020	North Bay	Nipissing	4	Laurentian	0
Series: Nipissing leads 7–1

=== Season-by-season Record ===
Won championship	Lost championship	Conference champions	League leader

Year	Coach	W	L	OTL	GF	GA	Pts	Finish	Conference Tournament
2019–20	Stacey Colarossi	10	14	0	45	55	20	10th	Did not qualify
2018–19									
2017–18									
2016–17									
2015–16									
2014–15									

=== Season team scoring champion ===
Year	Player	GP	G	A	PTS	PIM	OUA rank
2019–20	Karissa Hoskin	24	6	5	11	4	40th
2018-19	Morgan McCann	24	5	5	10	14	51st
2017-18	Samantha Morell	23	9	4	13	10	31st
2016-17	Morgan McCann	23	12	6	18	4	18th
2015-16							
2014-15							

== International ==
- Stacey Colarossi Head Coach Canada: 2019 Winter Universiade
- Morgan McCann, Forward
- Taylor Weber, Forward Canada: Ice hockey at the 2019 Winter Universiade (silver)

== Voyageurs in professional hockey ==
= CWHL All-Star	= NWHL All-Star	= Clarkson Cup Champion	= Isobel Cup Champion

Player	Position	Team(s)	League(s)	Years	Titles
Player	Position	Team(s)	League(s)	Years	Titles
