= Darren Turcotte =

American ice hockey player

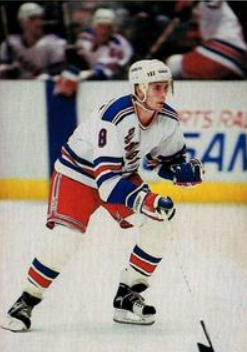
- Born: March 2, 1968 (age 58) Boston, Massachusetts, U.S.
- Height: 6 ft 0 in (183 cm)
- Weight: 190 lb (86 kg; 13 st 8 lb)
- Position: Center
- Shot: Left
- Played for: New York Rangers; Hartford Whalers; Winnipeg Jets; San Jose Sharks; St. Louis Blues; Nashville Predators
- National team: United States
- NHL draft: 114th overall, 1986; New York Rangers
- Playing career: 1988–2000

Darren Turcotte (born March 2, 1968) is an American former professional Ice hockey player.

== Early life ==
Turcotte's family moved to North Bay, Ontario where he spent most of his childhood. After his family returned to northern Ontario, he began playing ice hockey at the age of five. He then played six seasons with the Pinehill Coffee Shop 'AAA' minor hockey team, which at the time was coached by his father Don Turcotte. In 1984, now playing in the midget division, Darren scored 60 goals and in that same year he led the Pinehill Coffee Shop win the NOHA, Ontario, and Canadian Midget hockey titles. After his impressive 60 goal season, Darren was drafted to the Ontario Hockey League (OHL) North Bay Centennials in the third round. He played four seasons with the Centennials, averaging 60 points a season with 30 goals and 30 assists. He also made it to the OHL Cup championship final series in 1987, but North Bay lost the series in seven games to the Oshawa Generals. Turcotte finished his OHL career with a record of 128 goals and 150 assists for a total of 278 points with 211 regular season games played.

== Professional career ==
Turcotte was drafted in the 1986 NHL entry draft by the New York Rangers in the sixth round, number 114 overall. He made his NHL debut on October 6, 1988, but was sent down to the Denver Rangers of the International Hockey League (IHL). After he scored 49 points in 40 games in the IHL, he was called back up to New York. In his second game back, he registered his first NHL goal and went on to record his first career hat trick a couple weeks later. As a member of the Rangers, he played in the NHL All-Star game in 1991. In Turcotte's NHL career he played for the Rangers (1988-1993), Hartford Whalers (1993-1995), Winnipeg Jets (1995-1996), San Jose Sharks (1996-1997), St. Louis Blues (1997-1998), and Nashville Predators (1998-200). In 2000, Turcotte was forced to end his NHL career in Nashville due to injuries. In his 12-year NHL career, Turcotte recorded 411 points with 195 goals and 216 assists in 635 career games.

== Post career ==
After finishing his career with the Nashville Predators, Turcotte stayed in middle Tennessee and founded the Southern Ice Lightning AAA Midget traveling team in Brentwood, Tennessee. While in Tennessee, Turcotte began coaching his son Devan's tyke house league team as well as his Elite midget 'AAA' team. After a few years in Tennessee, Turcotte returned to North Bay where he became the assistant coach for the Abitibi Eskimos of the Northern Ontario Junior Hockey League (NOJHL) in 2005–06. Shortly after, he became the head coach for the North Bay Skyhawks for two seasons. During his two seasons with the Skyhawks, Turcotte had a 41-28-1 record. Turcotte went on to be the assistant coach for the Nipissing Lakers men's hockey team from 2008-2011. When Nipissing gained a women's ice hockey team in 2012, Turcotte made the switch to coaching women's hockey. He also coached the North Bay Ice Boltz midget AA girls' team, taking them to the finals of a LLFHL championship tournament in 2012 and the Esso Cup national championship in 2013. Turcotte also coached the Team USA inline hockey team that won gold at the 2006 World Inline Tournament. Turcotte also went on to create hockey camps and skill development programs in his hometown of North Bay. On April 27, 2004, Turcotte was the 196th inductee into the North Bay Hockey Hall of Fame and on May 3, 2013, he received the Judge Harry J. Reynolds Memorial Trophy for his contribution to hockey in North Bay. Currently, he is the head coach of the Nipissing Lakers women's ice hockey program.

== International play ==
Turcotte represented the United States at the 1987 and 1988 World Junior Ice Hockey Championships and senior level at the 1993 Men's World Ice Hockey Championships.

== Awards ==
- Played in NHL All-Star Game (1991)

== Legacy ==
In the 2009 book 100 Ranger Greats, the authors ranked Turcotte at No. 86 all-time of the 901 New York Rangers who had played during the team's first 82 seasons.

== Career statistics ==
=== Regular season and playoffs ===
			Regular season					Playoffs
Season	Team	League	GP	G	A	Pts	PIM	GP	G	A	Pts	PIM
1984–85	North Bay Centennials	OHL	62	33	32	65	28	8	0	2	2	0
1985–86	North Bay Centennials	OHL	62	35	37	72	35	10	3	4	7	8
1986–87	North Bay Centennials	OHL	55	30	48	78	20	18	12	8	20	6
1987–88	North Bay Centennials	OHL	32	30	33	63	16	4	3	0	3	4
1987–88	Colorado Rangers	IHL	8	4	3	7	9	6	2	6	8	8
1988–89	New York Rangers	NHL	20	7	3	10	4	1	0	0	0	0
1988–89	Denver Rangers	IHL	40	21	28	49	32	—	—	—	—	—
1989–90	New York Rangers	NHL	76	32	34	66	32	10	1	6	7	4
1990–91	New York Rangers	NHL	74	26	41	67	37	6	1	2	3	0
1991–92	New York Rangers	NHL	71	30	23	53	57	8	4	0	4	6
1992–93	New York Rangers	NHL	71	25	28	53	40	—	—	—	—	—
1993–94	New York Rangers	NHL	13	2	4	6	13	—	—	—	—	—
1993–94	Hartford Whalers	NHL	19	2	11	13	4	—	—	—	—	—
1994–95	Hartford Whalers	NHL	47	17	18	35	22	—	—	—	—	—
1995–96	Winnipeg Jets	NHL	59	16	16	32	26	—	—	—	—	—
1995–96	San Jose Sharks	NHL	9	6	5	11	4	—	—	—	—	—
1996–97	San Jose Sharks	NHL	65	16	21	37	16	—	—	—	—	—
1997–98	St. Louis Blues	NHL	62	12	6	18	26	10	0	0	0	2
1998–99	Nashville Predators	NHL	40	4	5	9	16	—	—	—	—	—
1999–2000	Nashville Predators	NHL	9	0	1	1	4	—	—	—	—	—
NHL totals			635	195	216	411	301	35	6	8	14	12

=== International ===
Year	Team	Event	GP	G	A	Pts	PIM
1987	United States	WJC	7	6	4	10	10
1988	United States	WJC	7	2	2	4	6
1993	United States	WC	6	2	1	3	0
Junior totals			14	8	6	14	16
