= 2028 U Sports Women's Ice Hockey Championship =

Canadian university ice hockey championship

- Season: 2027–28
- Teams: Eight
- Finals site: Scotiabank Centre; Halifax, Nova Scotia

The 2028 U Sports Women's Ice Hockey Championship is scheduled to be held from March 23 to March 26, 2028, in Halifax, Nova Scotia, to determine a national champion for the 2027–28 U Sports women's ice hockey season. The tournament will be hosted by the St. Francis Xavier X-Women.

== Host ==
The tournament is scheduled to be played at Scotiabank Centre in Halifax, Nova Scotia. This is scheduled to be the fourth time that St. Francis Xavier University will host the tournament, with the most recent in 2010. However, this will be the first time that Halifax will host the tournament.

== Scheduled teams ==
- Canada West Representative
- OUA Representative
- RSEQ Representative
- AUS Representative
- Host (St. Francis Xavier X-Women)
- Three additional berths
