= Chihiro Suzuki (ice hockey) =

Japanese ice hockey player (born 2002)

- Born: May 4, 2002 (age 24) Yokohama, Japan
- Height: 1.57 m (5 ft 2 in)
- Weight: 62 kg (137 lb; 9 st 11 lb)
- Position: Forward
- Shoots: Left
- U Sports team: Guelph Gryphons
- National team: Japan
Medal record
FISU World University Games
Silver medal – second place	2023	Ice hockey

Chihiro Suzuki (born 4 May 2002) is a Japanese ice hockey forward who has played U Sports women's ice hockey for the University of Guelph. She has represented Japan internationally, including at the IIHF Women's World Championship.

== Early life ==
Suzuki is from Yokohama, Japan. According to Hockey Canada, she began playing ice hockey as a child and later moved to Canada, continuing her development in the Canadian system.

== Playing career ==
=== University ===
Suzuki has played U Sports women's ice hockey for the Guelph Gryphons. University of Guelph Athletics reported that she transferred to Guelph from Laurentian University.

=== International ===
Suzuki has played for Japan at the senior level. The Canadian Press quoted her during the 2023 IIHF Women's World Championship and noted that she had spent nine years in Canada pursuing hockey. The IIHF reported that she made her Women's Worlds debut at the 2023 tournament. Japan finished seventh in the tournament.

Suzuki was also part of Japan's women's team at the 2023 Winter World University Games in Lake Placid, where Japan won silver in the women's ice hockey tournament.

== Coaching ==
Hockey Canada reported that Suzuki participated in its Creating Coaches program, a coaching-development initiative for U Sports student-athletes. University of Guelph News reported that she received a Hockey Canada grant to coach the Guelph U18AA women's team in 2023–24.

== Career statistics ==
=== University ===
Regular season
Season	Team	League	GP	G	A	Pts	PIM
2021–22	Guelph Gryphons	U Sports	13	2	1	3	4
2022–23	Guelph Gryphons	U Sports	28	5	6	11	14
2023–24	Guelph Gryphons	U Sports	34	6	3	9	24
2024–25	Guelph Gryphons	U Sports	30	5	4	9	12
Total			105	18	14	32	54

=== International ===
International
Year	Team	Event	Result	GP	G	A	Pts	PIM
2023	Japan	Winter World University Games	2nd place, silver medalist(s)	7	2	1	3	2
2023	Japan	IIHF Women's World Championship	7th	2	0	0	0	0
