= Chelsea Purcell =

Canadian ice hockey player

- Born: May 24, 1987 (age 39) Hudson Bay, Saskatchewan
- Height: 5 ft 6 in (168 cm)
- Shot: Right
- Played for: Aisulu Almaty (EWHL); Calgary Inferno (CWHL); Team Alberta (CWHL); Edmonton Chimos (WWHL); University of Saskatchewan (CIS)
- Playing career: 2008–2015
Medal record
Women's ball hockey
Representing Canada
ISBHF World Street Hockey Championships
Gold medal – first place	2013 Canada	Team
Gold medal – first place	2015 Switzerland	Team

Chelsea Purcell (born May 24, 1987) is a former women's ice hockey player. Among her career accomplishments, she was the first captain in the history of the CWHL's Team Alberta franchise. In addition, she was the captain of the Canada women's national ball hockey team that won a gold medal at the 2015 ISBHF World Championships in Zug, Switzerland.

== Playing career ==
=== CIS ===
A member of the Saskatchewan Huskies women's ice hockey program in the Canada West conference (part of Canadian Interuniversity Sport), Purcell would serve as team captain in her final two seasons (2008–09, 2009–10). During her final season, Purcell would log a hat trick in a 5-0 victory against the Calgary Dinos, providing the Huskies with their third straight win to start the 2009-10 campaign. Of note, it was the Dinos CIS first game played in Calgary since February 2002. She would graduate from the University of Saskatchewan in the spring of 2010 with a specialization in Kinesiology.

=== CWHL ===
Competing with Team Alberta, Purcell would log the first point of her CWHL career in her debut, an October 29, 2011 match versus the Brampton Thunder. She would be credited for an assist on a first period goal by Samantha Hunt.

On November 19, 2011, Purcell would register the first multi-point performance of her CWHL career, simultaneously logging her first career goal. Of note, she would score twice in the first period, part of a 5-4 final against the Toronto Furies. Both of Purcell's goals were scored against Furies netminder Sami Jo Small.

The 2013-14 CWHL season would mark the transition from Team Alberta into the Calgary Inferno. Although it would prove to be Purcell's final season in the league, she would rank fifth on the Inferno in team scoring.

The final point of her CWHL career came in a March 6, 2014 match against the Brampton Thunder. Purcell and Julie Paetsch both earned the assists on a third period goal scored by Danielle Stone. Of note, her final CWHL goal would take place on March 2, 2014. Scoring a short-handed goal against Brittany Ott of the Boston Blades during the third period, Rhianna Kurio and Erin Duggan were both credited with the assists. As a side note, it would also be the last multi-point game of her career, as she logged a second period assist on a goal scored by Kurio.

Heading into the 2016-17 CWHL season, Purcell shall serve as co-General Manager of the Brampton Thunder. When the franchise moved to Markham in the autumn of 2017, Purcell served in the capacity of full-time General Manager. During her first season in Markham, she assembled the roster that went on to win the 2018 Clarkson Cup, the first in franchise history.

=== Europe ===
For the 2015-16 women's ice hockey season, Purcell competed in the Elite Women's Hockey League. A member of Kazakhstan's Aisulu Almaty women's ice hockey team, she was one of three Canadians on the roster. Joining Purcell on said roster included Rayne Cruickshank and Karolina Urban. As a side note, Purcell and Urban were teammates on the Calgary Inferno during the 2013-14 CWHL season.

=== Ball hockey ===
Purcell was among the members of the Canadian national women's team that captured the gold medal on home soil at the 2013 ISBHF World Street Hockey Championships in St. John's, Newfoundland, Canada. Of note, she was one of four CWHL players named to the 2013 roster, including Mallory Johnston of the Brampton Thunder, and both Jenny Brine and Britni Smith of the Toronto Furies. Purcell has participated in four Canadian national ball hockey championships with the Alberta Rockies, capturing a bronze medal in 2014.

In the autumn of 2014, Purcell was named as one of the forwards for the Canadian national women's team at the 2015 ISBHF World Street Hockey Championships in Zug, Switzerland. The Canadian team went on to capture the gold medal, posting an undefeated mark.

Statistically, her best performance at the 2015 ISBHF Worlds was a multi-point effort in Canada's first game at the event. A June 22 match against Great Britain resulted in Purcell logging a goal and an assist in a shutout victory. A 9-1 win against Switzerland on June 24 saw Purcell and Karolina Urban both gain the assist on a goal scored by April Drake. In the semifinals, Drake and Urban would both log the assist on a goal scored by Purcell, Canada's second of the game.

== Career stats ==
Season	Team	League	GP	G	A	Pts	+/-	PIM
2008-09	Saskatchewan Huskies	Canada West (CIS)	24	7	15	22	+9	14
2009-10	Saskatchewan Huskies	Canada West (CIS)	24	8	17	25	+10	8
2010-11	Edmonton Chimos	WWHL	17	9	11	20	0	6
2011-12	Team Alberta	CWHL	15	6	2	8	+7	16
2012-13	Team Alberta	CWHL	23	0	5	5	+3	22
2013-14	Calgary Inferno	CWHL	24	4	6	10
2014-15	Aisulu Almaty	European Women's Champions Cup	3	0	0	0	-5	2
2015-16	Aisulu Almaty	EWHL	20	3	11	14	+5	18

== Awards and honours ==
- Canadian Interuniversity Sport Academic All-Canadian (2007, 2009, 2010)
- University of Saskatchewan Huskies Women's Hockey Alumni Award (2008)
