= Brock Badgers women's ice hockey =

Brock Badgers women's ice hockey program

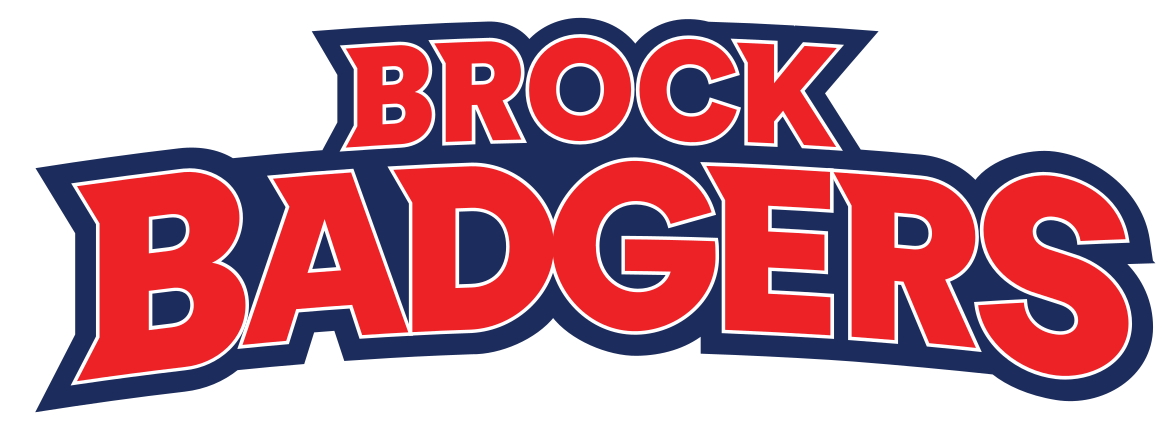
- University: Brock University
- Conference: OUA; West Division
- Governing Body: U Sports
- Head coach: Margot Page; Since 2015–16 season
- Arena: Seymour-Hannah Sports & Entertainment Centre; St. Catharines, Ontario
- Colors: Blue, Red, and White
- Mascot: Boomer the Badger

U Sports tournament appearances
- 2022

Conference tournament champions
- 2022

The Brock Badgers women's ice hockey team represents Brock University in St. Catharines, Ontario in the sport of ice hockey in the Ontario University Athletics (OUA) conference of U Sports. The Badgers program first began in 2000 and have won one OUA championship. The team is led by head coach Margot Page, who has held that position since 2015.

== History ==
=== Recent season-by-season record ===
Won championship	Lost championship	Conference champions	League leader

Year	Coach	W	OTW	L	OTL	GF	GA	Pts	Standing	Postseason
2009–10	Todd Erskine	8	3	13	3	55	79	25	7th	Did not qualify
2010–11	Jim Denham	19	3	5	0	85	52	44	2nd	Lost OUA Semi-Final Guelph (2–0 series)
2011–12	Jim Denham	10	2	13	1	74	74	25	8th	Lost OUA Quarter-Final Laurier (2–0 series)
2012–13	Jim Denham	4	1	20	1	51	109	11	10th	Did not qualify
2013–14	Jim Denham	7	1	13	3	58	70	20	9th	Did not qualify
2014–15	Jim Denham	2	0	19	3	41	85	8	13th	Did not qualify
2015–16	Margot Page	8	2	13	1	37	52	28	9th	Did not qualify
2016–17	Margot Page	8	3	10	3	51	47	33	9th	Did not qualify
2017–18	Margot Page	12	0	10	2	50	51	36	7th	Lost OUA Quarter-Final Guelph (2–0 series)
2018–19	Margot Page	12	2	9	1	56	54	38	8th	Lost OUA Quarter-Final Guelph (2–0 series)
2019–20	Margot Page	13	1	10	0	49	45	44	4th	Lost OUA Quarter-Final Ryerson (2–0 series)
2020–21	Cancelled due to the COVID-19 pandemic									
2021–22	Margot Page	5	2	4	5	29	33	23	3rd (OUA West)	Won OUA West Semi-Final vs. Guelph (2–1); Won OUA West Final vs. Western (3–0); Won OUA Championship vs. Nipissing (2–1)

== Season team scoring champion ==
Year	Player	GP	G	A	PTS	PIM	OUA rank
2015–16	Laura Neu	24	6	5	11	8	48th
2017–18	Christina Ieradi	24	11	7	18	28	13th
2016–17	Annie Berg	24	11	12	23	18	7th
2018–19	Annie Berg	24	11	14	25	6	4th
2019–20	Annie Berg	24	8	12	20	9	11th

== Awards and honours ==
Former Badgers hockey player Niamh Haughey was identified as Olympic talent during an RBC Training Ground combine event held at Brock University in 2018. For the 2020-21 season, she was named as one of 33 athletes to the Canadian national bobsled team.

=== University Awards ===
- Jessica Fickel, Brock 2013-14 Female Athlete of the Year Award

==== Athletes of the Week ====
- Jensen Murphy, Brock Badgers Female Athlete of the Week (awarded November 25, 2019 and January 6, 2020)
- Cassidy Maplethorpe, Brock Badgers Female Athlete of the Week (awarded December 12, 2019 and January 20, 2020)

=== Team Awards ===
==== Most Valuable Player ====
- 2019-20: Jensen Murphy

==== Rookie of the Year ====
- 2019-20: Emma Irwin

=== OUA Awards ===
- Todd Erskine, 2004-05 OUA (East) Coach of the Year
- Kate Allgood, 2005-06 OUA Most Valuable Player
- Kate Allgood, 2005-06 OUA Forward of the Year
- Kate Allgood, 2006-07 OUA Forward of the Year
- Jim Denham, 2010-11 OUA Coach of the Year
- Kelly Walker, 2010-11 OUA Forward of the Year
- Kelly Walker, 2010-11 OUA Most Valuable Player
- Annie Berg, 2016-17 OUA Rookie of the Year
- Jensen Murphy, 2019-20 OUA Goaltender of the Year

=== OUA All-Stars ===
- Beth Clause, 2009-10 OUA Second Team All-Star

=== OUA All-Rookie Team ===
- Sydney Hood (2024–25)

=== USports Awards ===
- Annie Berg, 2017 USports All-Rookie Team

=== Retired Jerseys ===
- #9 Jessica Fickel

== Badgers in professional hockey ==
= CWHL All-Star	= NWHL All-Star	= Clarkson Cup Champion	= Isobel Cup Champion

Player	Position	Team(s)	League(s)	Years	Titles
Hunter Accursi	Forward	Buffalo Beauts	NWHL	1	
Jessica Fickel	Forward	Buffalo Beauts	NWHL	1	
Alex Finlayson	Forward	Färjestad BK Dam	SDHL		
Marissa Graham	Defense	Färjestad BK Dam	SDHL		

=== International ===
- Jessica Fickel Canada: 2015 Winter Universiade (silver)
- Annie Berg Canada: Ice hockey at the 2019 Winter Universiade (silver)

== See also ==
- Ontario University Athletics women's ice hockey
