= 2020 U Sports Women's Ice Hockey Championship =

Canadian university ice hockey championship

- Season: 2019-20
- Teams: Eight
- Finals site: MacLauchlan Arena; Charlottetown, P.E.I.
- Champions: No champion

The 2020 U Sports Women's Ice Hockey Championship was scheduled to be held March 12–15, 2020, in Charlottetown, Prince Edward Island, to determine a national champion for the 2019–20 U Sports women's ice hockey season. The tournament was cancelled after two semi-final games had been played due to the COVID-19 pandemic. Despite the cancellation, the 2020 U SPORTS women’s hockey championship was named the SCORE! Event of the Year by PEI Amateur Sport.

The entire tournament was to be played at MacLauchlan Arena on the campus of the University of Prince Edward Island. It was the second consecutive year that the tournament was to be hosted by UPEI as well as their second time hosting overall.

== Participating teams ==
| Seed | Team | Qualified | Record |
|---|---|---|---|
| 1 | Alberta Pandas | Canada West Champion | 19–8–1–0 |
| 2 | Toronto Varsity Blues | OUA Champion | 17–4–1–2 |
| 3 | St. Francis Xavier X-Women | AUS Champion | 22–5–1 |
| 4 | McGill Martlets | RSEQ Champion | 11–5–3–1 |
| 5 | York Lions | OUA Finalist | 14–8–0–2 |
| 6 | Montreal Carabins | RSEQ Finalist | 9–6–4–1 |
| 7 | Mount Royal Cougars | Canada West Finalist | 12–14–2–0 |
| 8 | UPEI Panthers | AUS Semifinalist (Host) | 20–7–1 |

== Championship Bracket ==
First Round: March 12/13
1 | Alberta Pandas
8 | UPEI Panthers
4 | McGill Martlets
5 | York Lions
2 | Toronto Varsity Blues | 1
7 | Mount Royal Cougars | 2
3 | St. Francis Xavier X-Women | 3
6 | Montreal Carabins | 2

Semi-Finals: March 14
7 | Mount Royal Cougars
3 | St. Francis Xavier X-Women

Gold Medal Game: March 15
Bronze Medal Game: March 15

== Consolation Bracket ==
Semi-Finals: March 14

Fifth Place Game: March 15
