= Ontario University Athletics women's ice hockey =

US collegiate ice hockey conference

OUA Hockey
- Formerly: Ontario Universities Athletics Association; Ontario Women's Intercollegiate Athletics Association
- Conference: U Sports
- Founded: 1997
- Sports fielded: Ice Hockey; men's: 20 teams; women's: 13 teams
- No. of teams: 20
- Headquarters: Hamilton, Ontario
- Region: Ontario
- Website: Official website

The Ontario University Athletics (OUA) came into being in 1997 with the merger of the Ontario Universities Athletics Association and the Ontario Women's Intercollegiate Athletics Association. This is similar to what would be called a college athletic conference in the United States.

== Notable games ==
- On February 11, 2000, the Ontario University Athletics women's ice hockey program saw its longest game take place. The University of Toronto's Rhonda Mitchell scored on a 35-foot slap shot. It was the 5:07 mark of the eighth period and the Varsity Blues defeated York University. Although the victory allowed the U of T to advance to the OUA gold medal game, it was the longest in the history of Canadian women's hockey. The game lasted over five hours and ten minutes. York's player of the game was goaltender Debra Ferguson, as she valiantly made 63 saves over 125 minutes.
- On March 3, 2011, a postseason match between the Queen's Golden Gaels and the Guelph Gryphons became the longest collegiate hockey game, male or female, Canadian or American — on record. The match began on Wednesday and it only ended on Thursday. The duration of the match was 167 minutes and 14 seconds when Queen's forward Morgan McHaffie placed a rebound past Gryphons goalie Danielle Skoufranis.

== Members ==
Institution	Location	Nickname	Founded	Colors
Brock University	St. Catharines, Ontario	Badgers	1964	Blue , Red and White
Laurentian University	Sudbury, Ontario	Voyageurs	1960	Gold and Blue
Nipissing University	North Bay, Ontario	Lakers	1992	Green and Blue
Ontario Tech University	Oshawa, Ontario	Ridgebacks	2002	Dark blue, light blue, orange
Queen's University	Kingston, Ontario	Golden Gaels	1841	Gold , Blue and Red
Toronto Metropolitan University	Toronto, Ontario	TMU Bold (formerly Ryerson Rams)	1948	Blue and Gold
Wilfrid Laurier University	Waterloo, Ontario	Golden Hawks	1960	Purple and Gold
University of Guelph	Guelph, Ontario	Gryphons	1964	Red , Gold and Black
University of Toronto	Toronto, Ontario	Varsity Blues	1827	Blue and White
University of Waterloo	Waterloo, Ontario	Warriors	1959	Gold , Black and White
University of Western Ontario	London, Ontario	Mustangs	1878	Purple and White
University of Windsor	Windsor, Ontario	Lancers	1857	Blue and Gold
York University	North York, Ontario	Lions	1959	Red , Black and White

=== Conference arenas ===
School	Hockey arena (built)	Capacity
Brock	Seymour-Hannah Sports & Entertainment Centre	1,400
Guelph	Gryphon Centre Arena	1,400
Laurentian	Countryside Sports Complex	5,100
Laurier	Waterloo Recreation Complex	3,400
Nipissing	North Bay Memorial Gardens (1955)	4,262
Ontario Institute of Technology	UOIT Campus Ice Centre	550
Queen's	Kingston Memorial Centre	3,300
Ryerson	Mattamy Home Ice (1931)	2,796
Toronto	Varsity Arena	4,116
Waterloo	Columbia Ice Field	1,000
Windsor	South Windsor Arena	1,000
Western	Thompson Arena	3,615
York	Canlan Ice Sports-York	1,700

== Champions ==
=== Regular season champions ===
Year	School	Wins	Losses	Overtime Losses	Points
2009–10	Wilfrid Laurier	26	0	1	53
2008–09	Wilfrid Laurier	26	1	0	52
2007–08	Wilfrid Laurier	23	2	2	48

== McCaw Cup championship games ==
- March 7, 2015: Western def. Guelph 2–0
- March 12, 2016: Guelph def. Western 5–1
- March 11, 2017: Guelph def. Nipissing 6–1
- March 10, 2018: Western def. Queen’s 3–0
- March 9, 2019: Guelph def. Toronto 4–2
- March 6, 2020: Toronto def. York 3–1

Year	School
2009–10	Wilfrid Laurier
2007–08	Wilfrid Laurier

== National championship teams ==
School	No. of titles	Year(s)
Toronto Varsity Blues	1	2001
Laurier Golden Hawks	1	2005
Western Mustangs	1	2015
Guelph Gryphons	1	2019

== Regular season scoring champions ==
In progress

Year	Player	School	GP	G	A	PTS	PIM
2016–17	Krystin Lawrence	Windsor	24	23	9	32	20
2017–18	Katrina Manoukarakis	Queen's	24	15	15	30	16
2018–19	April Clark	Western	24	20	13	33	18
2019–20	Taytum Clairmont	Waterloo	23	11	17	28	30

== Awards and honors ==
=== All-star teams ===
- First Team 1999–2000

Player	Position	School
Joyce Torrington	G	Laurier
Melanie Roach	D	York
Heather Vance	D	Toronto
Lisa Backman	F	Laurier
Jen Rawson	F	Toronto
Sari Krooks	F	York

- Second Team 1999–2000

Player	Position	School
Shannon Bettles	G	Guelph
Tanja Vlahovich	D	Guelph
Sandy Hustler	D	Windsor
Caroline Hall	F	Laurier
Krista Lehrbass	F	Guelph
Jackie Cherevaty	F	Toronto

- First Team 1998–99

Player	Position	School
Shelley Campbell	G	Windsor
Melanie Roach	D	York
Sandy Hustler	D	Windsor
Lisa Backman	F	Laurier
Coley Dosser	F	Guelph
Urzula May	F	Toronto

- Second Team 1998–99

Player	Position	School
Shannon Bettles	G	Guelph
Heather Vance	D	Toronto
Kim Shillington	D	Laurier
Lori Loftus	F	Queen's
Karent Kett	F	York
Jennifer Krog	F	Laurier

- First Team 1997–98

Player	Position	School
Shelly Campbell	G	Windsor
Stephanie Campell	D	Toronto
Ali MacMillan	D	Toronto
Coley Dosser	F	Guelph
Sue Ann Van Damme	F	Toronto
Cheryl Pounder	F	Laurier

- Second Team 1997–98

Player	Position	School
Colette Good	G	York
Allyson Fox	D	York
Ingrid Gedies	D	Guelph
Shanley White	F	York
Jen Rawson	F	Toronto
Tammy Kerr	F	Guelph

- First Team 1996–97

Player	Position	School
Debra Ferguson	G	York
Allyson Fox	D	York
Sarah Miller	D	Guelph
Jayna Hefford	F	Toronto
Sari Krooks	F	York
	F	

- Second Team 1996–97

Player	Position	School
Shelly Campbell	G	Windsor
Heather Balbraith	D	York
Cheryl Pounder	D	Laurier
Sarah Applegarth	F	Guelph
Lori Dupuis	F	Toronto
Amy Turek	F	Laurier

- First Team 1995–96

Player	Position	School
Michelle Clayton	G	York
Cassie Campbell	D	Guelph
Julie Walker	D	Queen's
Andria Hunter	F	Toronto
Amy Turek	F	Laurier
Katie Quinn	F	York

- Second Team 1995–96

Player	Position	School
Jennifer Dewar	G	Guelph
Cheryl Pounder	D	Laurier
Allyson Fox	D	York
Sarah Applegarth	F	Guelph
Lori Dupuis	F	Toronto
Laura Schuler	F	Toronto

- First Team 1994–95

Player	Position	School
Jenifer Dewar	G	Guelph
Lori Dupuis	D	Toronto
Andria Hunter	D	Toronto
Amy Turek	F	Laurier
Stacey Harvey	F	Queen's
Nathalie Rivard	F	Toronto

- Second Team 1994–95

Player	Position	School
Michelle Clayton and Tammy Edger (tie)	G	York and Queen's
Liz Duval	D	Guelph
Katie Quinn	D	York
Rebecca Reid	F	Toronto
Cassie Campbell	F	Guelph
Julie Walker	F	Queen's

- First Team 1993–94

Player	Position	School
Michelle Clayton	G	York
Andria Hunter	D	Toronto
Stephanie Boyd	D	Toronto
Liz Duval	F	Guelph
Stacey Harvey	F	Queen's
Nathalie Rivard	F	Toronto

- Second Team 1993–94

Player	Position	School
Jennifer Dewar	G	Guelph
Sarah Applegarth	D	Guelph
Lori Dupuis	D	Toronto
Katie Quinn	F	York
Michelle Holmes	F	Guelph
Cassie Campbell	F	Guelph

- First Team 1992–93

Player	Position	School
Leslie Reddon	G	Toronto
Stacey Harvey	D	Queen's
Stephanie Boyd	D	Toronto
Lori Dupuis	F	Toronto
Marni Barrow	F	York
Lori Taylor	F	Toronto

- Second Team 1992–93

Player	Position	School
Stephanie Slade	G	Guelph
Cassie Campbell	D	Guelph
Natalie Rivard	D	Toronto
Liz Duval	F	Guelph
Helen Knowles	F	Guelph
Michele Hanes	F	Guelph

- First Team 1991–92

Player	Position	School
Marci Hickmott	G	Guelph
Stacey Harvey	D	Queen's
Lori Taylor	D	Toronto
Andria Hunter	F	Toronto
Julie Stevens	F	Queen's
Nancy Deschamps	F	Guelph

- Second Team 1991–92

Player	Position	School
Leslie Reddon	G	Toronto
Marni Barrow	D	York
Helen Knowles	D	Guelph
Stephanie Boyd	F	Toronto
Vicky Sunohara	F	Toronto
Heather White	F	Queen's

- First Team 1990–91

Player	Position	School
Leslie Reddon	G	Toronto
Marnie Barrow	D	York
Stephanie Boyd	D	Toronto
Andria Hunter	F	Toronto
Sue Patterson	F	Queen's
Vicky Sunohara	F	Toronto

- Second Team 1990–91

Player	Position	School
Marci Hickmott and Heather Zakary (tie)	G	Guelph and Toronto
Kelli Chittick	D	Guelph
Elizabeth Duvall	D	Guelph
Laura Lloyd	F	McMaster
Stacey Harvey	F	Queen's
Jules Stevens	F	Queen's

- First Team 1989–90

Player	Position	School
Sandy Stanifort	G	McMaster
Marni Barrow	D	Toronto
Lori Taylor	D	Toronto
Jenny Patterson	F	Guelph
Jules Stevens	F	Queens
Sue Patterson	F	Queens

- Second Team 1989–90

Player	Position	School
Leslie Reddon	G	Toronto
Rebecca Higgins	D	Queens
Cindy McGarroch	D	Toronto
Michele Campbell	F	York
Kelly Borutski	F	McMaster
Laurie Wise	F	Toronto

- First Team 1983–84

Player	Position	School
Glenda Rosen	G	McMaster
Sue Scherer	D	Guelph
Sophie Radecki	D	Toronto
Carolyn Aylesworth	C	Queens
Marjot Verlaan	RW	McMaster
Heather Ginzel	LW	Toronto

- First Team 1982–83

Player	Position	School
Karen Ranson	G	Toronto
Sue Scherer	D	Guelph
Beth Harrison	D	McMaster
Carolyn Aylesworth	C	Queens
Sue Howard	RW	York
Karen Wright	LW	Toronto

- First Team 1981–82

Player	Position	School
Cindy Vining	G	McMaster
Tina Vlad	D	Guelph
Barb Boys	D	York
Sue Howard	C	York
Helen Murphy	RW	Toronto
Donna Downes	LW	McMaster

=== Most Valuable player ===
Year	Player	School
2008–09	Andrea Bevan	Laurier
2007–08	Lauren Barch	Laurier
2006–07	Andrea Bevan	Laurier
2005–06	Kate Allgood	Brock
2004–05	Cindy Eadie	Laurier

=== Scoring leaders ===
Year	Player	School	Points
2008–09	Tamara Bell; Andrea Ironside	Guelph; Laurier	
2007–08	Janine Davies	Toronto	
2006–07	Kate Allgood	Brock	
1998–99	Jackie Cherevaty	Toronto	36

== International ==
=== OUA players in the Olympics ===
Player	Position	School	Event	Result
Lesley Reddon	Goaltender	University of Toronto	1998 Winter Olympics	Silver
Lori Dupuis	Forward	University of Toronto	1998 Winter Olympics	Silver
Lori Dupuis	Forward	University of Toronto	2002 Winter Olympics	Gold
Jayna Hefford	Forward	University of Toronto	1998 Winter Olympics	Silver
Jayna Hefford	Forward	University of Toronto	2002 Winter Olympics	Gold
Jayna Hefford	Forward	University of Toronto	2006 Winter Olympics	Silver
Jayna Hefford	Forward	University of Toronto	2010 Winter Olympics	Gold
Laura Schuler	Forward	University of Toronto	1998 Winter Olympics	Silver
Vicky Sunohara	Forward	University of Toronto	1998 Winter Olympics	Silver
Vicky Sunohara	Forward	University of Toronto	2002 Winter Olympics	Gold

=== Winter Universiade ===
==== 2011 ====
- Jacalyn Sollis, Forward, Guelph Canada: 2011 Winter Universiade
- Jessica Zerafa, Forward, Guelph Canada 2011 Winter Universiade

==== 2015 ====
- Laura Brooker – Wilfrid Laurier Canada: 2015 Winter Universiade
- Katelyn Gosling, Defense, Western Canada: Ice hockey at the 2015 Winter Universiade
- Nicole Kesteris – Toronto Canada: 2015 Winter Universiade

==== 2017 ====
- Katherine Bailey, Defense: Guelph Canada: 2017 Winter Universiade
- Katelyn Gosling, Defense: Western Canada: 2017 Winter Universiade
- Kelly Gribbons, Forward: Guelph Canada: 2017 Winter Universiade
- Brianna Iazzolino, Defense: Western Canada: 2017 Winter Universiade
- Valerie Lamenta, Goaltender: Guelph Canada: 2017 Winter Universiade
- Rachel Marriott, Forward: Waterloo Canada: 2017 Winter Universiade
- Stephanie Sluys, Goaltender: Waterloo Canada: Ice hockey at the 2017 Winter Universiade

Coaching staff

- Rachel Flanagan, Head Coach: Guelph Canada
- Kelly Paton, Assistant Coach: Western Canada
- Shaun Reagan, Assistant Coach: Waterloo Canada

==== 2019 ====
- Ailish Forfar, Forward: Ryerson Canada
- Lauren Straatman – Toronto Canada: Ice hockey at the 2019 Winter Universiade
