= Windsor Lancers women's ice hockey =

Canadian collegiate sports program

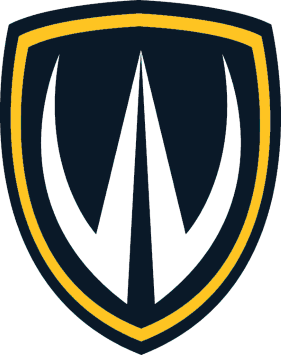
- University: University of Windsor
- Conference: OUA; West Division
- Governing Body: U Sports
- Head coach: Deanna Iwanicka; 3rd season
- Assistant coaches: Joe Plante; Amy Maitre; Ashley Maitre; Perry Wilson; Cait Stiles
- Arena: Adie Knox Arena; Windsor
- Colors: Blue and Gold
- Mascot: Lancer

The Windsor Lancers women's ice hockey program represents the University of Windsor in the OUA conference of U Sports.

== History ==
Debuting as the Lancers head coach in 2009-10, Jim Hunter enjoyed a sterling season. With the Lancers reaching the OUA Semi-Finals, the second half of the season resulted in a sparkling 9-2 conference mark, highlighted by a defeat of the #2 ranked Laurier Golden Hawks in the regular season finale. Finishing the 2010-11 season with 15 wins, compared to 11 losses and one tie, the Lancers reached the CIS Top Ten rankings for the first time ever.

Reaching 14 wins in 2013-14, including eight losses and two ties, the Lancers 85 goals in merely 24 games established themselves as the highest scoring team in the OUA, and third overall in the nation. Jenny MacKnight would clinch the OUA scoring title with an impressive 40 points, also earning the OUA Player of the Year Award and a spot on the Canadian Interuniversity Sport All-Canadian Team, respectively. Taking place on home ice at South Windsor Arena, Jenny McKnight recorded a hat trick during a convincing 6-1 victory over the Brock Badgers on November 23, 2014. With the performance, MacKnight reached the milestone of 100 career points.

With a 14-6-4 mark in 2014-15, the second consecutive season of 14 wins, it resulted in the best winning percentage in program history, simultaneously earning their sixth straight playoff appearance. During the 2016-17 season, Jim Hunter reached his 100th career victory. That season saw Krystin Lawrence become the second player in program history to capture the OUA Most Valuable Player Award.

During the OUA/U SPORTS hiatus due to the ongoing COVID-19 pandemic, Windsor Lancer women's hockey player Devynn Dion starred as an 'acting double' for the lead actress portraying the character, Maya, in the new Disney+ series The Mighty Ducks: Game Changers which premiered in March 2021.

=== Season-by-season Record ===
| Won championship | Lost championship | Conference champions | League leader |

| Year | Coach | W | L | OTL | GF | GA | Pts | Finish | Conference Tournament |
| 2019-20 | | 3 | 21 | 0 | | | 6 | 13th, OUA | Did not qualify |
| 2018-19 | | | | | | | | | |

=== Season team scoring champion ===
| Year | Player | GP | G | A | PTS | PIM | OUA rank |
| 2019–20 | Jessica Gribbon | 24 | 6 | 6 | 12 | 14 | 36th, OUA |
| 2018-19 | Taylor Conte | 23 | 4 | 4 | 8 | 10 | 80th, OUA |
| 2017-18 | Taylor Conte | 24 | 4 | 7 | 11 | 6 | 49th, OUA |
| 2016-17 | Krystin Lawrence | 24 | 23 | 9 | 32 | 20 | 1st, OUA |
| 2015-16 | Krystin Lawrence | 22 | 13 | 18 | 31 | 49 | 1st, OUA |
| 2014-15 | Krystin Lawrence | 23 | 11 | 11 | 22 | 39 | 8th, OUA |
| 2013-14 | | | | | | | |

=== Team captains ===
- 2014-15: Kayla Dodson
- 2015-16: Jillian Rops and Erinn Noseworthy
- 2018-19: Rachel Chantler (captain), Ashley Maitre, Molly Jenkins and Alix Reiter (assistant captains)

== International ==
- Jenny MacKnight Canada: 2015 Winter Universiade
- Bree Polci Canada: 2015 Winter Universiade
- Jim Hunter Canada 2015 Winter Universiade Assistant coach

== Awards and Honours ==
=== University Honours ===
- 2017 University of Windsor Athlete of the Year (female): Krystin Lawrence
- 2020 Captain's Trophy (female): Ashley Maitre

=== OUA Awards ===
- Pat Hennessy, 2002-03 OUA Coach of the Year Western Division
- Katie Clubb, 2002-03 OUA Rookie of the Year Western Division
- Jenny MacKnight, 2013-14 OUA scoring champion
- Krystin Lawrence, 2015-16 OUA scoring champion
- Krystin Lawrence, 2016-17 OUA scoring champion
- Lerissa Stevens, Windsor, 2025-26 OUA West Rookie of the Year
- Teagan Pare, Windsor, 2025-26 OUA West Defender of the Year

==== OUA Player of the Year ====
- Jenny MacKnight, 2013-14 OUA Player of the Year
- Krystin Lawrence, 2016-17 OUA Player of the Year

=== OUA Forward of the Year ===
- Jenny MacKnight, 2013-14
- Krystin Lawrence, 2015-16
- Krystin Lawrence 2016-17

=== OUA All-Stars ===
- Krystin Lawrence 2015 OUA All-Rookie Team
- Krystin Lawrence 2016 OUA Second Team All-Star
- Krystin Lawrence 2017 OUA First Team All-Star
- Natalie Barrette 2017 OUA Second Team All-Star

=== OUA All-Rookie Team ===
- Teagan Pare (2024–25)

=== All-Canadians ===
- Jenny MacKnight, 2013-14 CIS All-Canadian
- Krystin Lawrence, 2016-17 U SPORTS Second Team All-Canadian

== Lancers in professional hockey ==
| = CWHL All-Star | = NWHL All-Star | = Clarkson Cup Champion | = Isobel Cup Champion |

| Player | Position | Team(s) | League(s) | Years | Titles |
|---|---|---|---|---|---|
| Molly Jenkins | Goaltender | Aisulu Almaty | EWHL | | |
