= 2019 U Sports Women's Ice Hockey Championship =

Canadian university ice hockey championship

- Season: 2018-19
- Teams: Eight
- Finals site: MacLauchlan Arena; Charlottetown, P.E.I.
- Champions: Guelph Gryphons (1st title)
- Runner-up: McGill Martlets
- Semifinalists: McGill, 1, vs Alberta, 0; Guelph, 5 vs Montreal, 0
- Winning coach: Rachel Flanagan (1st title)
- MVP: Jade Downie-Landry (McGill Martlets)

The 2019 U Sports Women's Ice Hockey Championship was held March 14–17, 2019, in Charlottetown, P.E.I., to determine a national champion for the 2018–19 U Sports women's ice hockey season.

The Guelph Gryphons defeated the McGill Martlets by a 1–0 score in the championship game, as Valerie Lamenta earned the shutout. Guelph captain Kaitlin Lowy scored the game-winning goal, as the Gryphons won their first-ever national championship. Of note, the 2019 event broke attendance records for the history of the U Sports women's ice hockey championship.

== Participating teams ==
Seed	Team	Qualified	Record
1	Alberta Pandas	Canada West Champion	
2	Montreal Carabins	RSEQ Finalist	
3	Guelph Gryphons	OUA Champion	
4	St. Thomas Tommies	AUS Champion	
5	McGill Martlets	RSEQ Champion	
6	Manitoba Bisons	Canada West Finalist	
7	UPEI Panthers	AUS (Host)	
8	Toronto Varsity Blues	OUA Finalist	

== Championship Bracket ==
First Round: March 14/16
3	Guelph Gryphons	3
6	Manitoba Bisons	2
2	Montreal Carabins	3
7	PEI Panthers	0
5	McGill Martlets	10
4	St. Thomas Tommies	2
1	Alberta Pandas	3
8	Toronto Varsity Blues	2

Semi-Finals: March 17
Guelph Gryphons	5
2	Montreal Carabins	0
5	McGill Martlets	1
1	Alberta Pandas	0

Gold Medal Game: March 17
3	Guelph Gryphons	1
5	McGill Martlets	0
Bronze Medal Game: March 15
2	Montreal Carabins	2
1	Alberta Pandas	1

== Consolation Bracket ==
Semi-Finals: March 14
6	Manitoba Bisons	3
7	PEI Panthers	1
8	Toronto Varsity Blues	2
4	St. Thomas Tommies	1

Fifth Place Game: March 15
6	Manitoba Bisons	2
8	Toronto Varsity Blues	0

== Awards and honors ==
- Championship Tournament MVP: Jade Downie-Landry, McGill

=== Players of the Game ===
Game	Player	School
March 14: Guelph vs. Manitoba	Nicole MacKinnon	Guelph
March 14: Montreal vs PEI	Alexandra Labelle	Montreal Carabins
March 16: Toronto vs Alberta	Cristine Chao; Alex Poznikoff	Toronto; Alberta
March 16: McGill vs Alberta	Stéphanie Desjardins; Kristen Chamberlin	McGill; Alberta
March 16: Guelph vs. Montreal	Valérie Lamenta	Guelph
March 17: Montreal vs Alberta	Aube Racine; Danielle Hardy	Montreal; Alberta
March 17: Guelph vs. McGill	Kaitlin Lowy; Shana Walker	Guelph; McGill

=== All-Tournament Team ===
Player	School
Jade Downie-Landry	McGill
Valérie Audet	McGill
Claire Merrick	Guelph
Taylor Kezama	Alberta
Mallory Young	Guelph
Valerie Lamenta	Guelph
