= U Sports women's ice hockey championship =

Canadian collegiate ice hockey tournament

- Current season, competition or edition: 2026 U Sports Women's Ice Hockey Championship
- Sport: Ice hockey
- Founded: 1998; 28 years ago
- First season: 1998
- Organizing body: U Sports
- No. of teams: 8
- Country: Canada
- Most recent champion: Montreal Carabins (3rd title)
- Most titles: Alberta Pandas (8)
- Website: usports.ca/en/championships/hockey/f

The U Sports Women's Ice Hockey Championship, is a Canadian university ice hockey tournament conducted by U Sports, and determines the women's national champion. The tournament involves the champions from each of Canada's four regional sports conferences. The Golden Path Trophy is awarded to the winners.

== History ==
The championship has been competed for in U Sports since 1998, when the sport was established in what was then known as the Canadian Interuniversity Athletics Union. Prior to that, only teams from Ontario would compete for a women's ice hockey championship.

The trophy was donated by Katherine Cartwright in 1998, which is when the championship was first contested. Cartwright was the first head coach of the Queen's Gaels women's hockey program in 1971 and led the movement to reinstate women's hockey at the collegiate level in 1960, following a nine-year hiatus.

With the completion of the 2022 championship, the Alberta Pandas have won the most national championships, with eight wins in 10 appearances, followed by the McGill Martlets, with four wins in nine appearances. The Concordia Stingers and Montreal Carabins are next with three and two titles, respectively, followed by six teams with one win each.

The 2020 championship tournament was cancelled after two semi-final games had been played due to the COVID-19 pandemic. On 15 October 2020, it was announced that the 2021 national championship was also cancelled.

== Results ==
| Year | Winner | Score | Runner-up | Host University | Location | Ref. |
|---|---|---|---|---|---|---|
| 1998 | Concordia Stingers (1) | 4–1 | Toronto Lady Blues | Concordia University | Montreal, Quebec | |
| 1999 | Concordia Stingers (2) | 2–0 | Alberta Pandas | University of Toronto | Toronto, Ontario | |
| 2000 | Alberta Pandas (1) | 2–0 | McGill Martlets | Concordia University | Montreal, Quebec | |
| 2001 | Toronto Lady Blues (1) | 4–3 | Regina Cougars | University of Calgary | Calgary, Alberta | |
| 2002 | Alberta Pandas (2) | 5–2 | Wilfrid Laurier Golden Hawks | University of Regina | Regina, Saskatchewan | |
| 2003 | Alberta Pandas (3) | 5–4 (OT) | Toronto Lady Blues | University of Regina | Regina, Saskatchewan | |
| 2004 | Alberta Pandas (4) | 2–0 | Ottawa Gee-Gees | McGill University | Montreal, Quebec | |
| 2005 | Wilfrid Laurier Golden Hawks (1) | 4–1 | Alberta Pandas | McGill University | Montreal, Quebec | |
| 2006 | Alberta Pandas (5) | 2–1 | Wilfrid Laurier Golden Hawks | St. Francis Xavier University | Antigonish, Nova Scotia | |
| 2007 | Alberta Pandas (6) | 4–0 | McGill Martlets | University of Ottawa | Ottawa, Ontario | |
| 2008 | McGill Martlets (1) | 2–0 | Wilfrid Laurier Golden Hawks | University of Ottawa | Ottawa, Ontario | |
| 2009 | McGill Martlets (2) | 3–1 | Wilfrid Laurier Golden Hawks | St. Francis Xavier University | Antigonish, Nova Scotia | |
| 2010 | Alberta Pandas (7) | 2–0 | McGill Martlets | St. Francis Xavier University | Antigonish, Nova Scotia | |
| 2011 | McGill Martlets (3) | 5–2 | St. Francis Xavier X-Women | Wilfrid Laurier University | Waterloo, Ontario | |
| 2012 | Calgary Dinos (1) | 5–1 | Montreal Carabins | University of Alberta | Edmonton, Alberta | |
| 2013 | Montreal Carabins (1) | 3–2 | Calgary Dinos | University of Toronto | Toronto, Ontario | |
| 2014 | McGill Martlets 4) | 4–3 (2OT) | Montreal Carabins | St. Thomas University | Fredericton, New Brunswick | |
| 2015 | Western Mustangs (1) | 5–0 | McGill Martlets | University of Calgary | Calgary, Alberta | |
| 2016 | Montreal Carabins (2) | 8–0 | UBC Thunderbirds | University of Calgary | Calgary, Alberta | |
| 2017 | Alberta Pandas (8) | 2–1 (2OT) | McGill Martlets | Queen's University | Kingston, Ontario | |
| 2018 | Manitoba Bisons (1) | 2–0 | Western Mustangs | University of Western Ontario | London, Ontario | |
| 2019 | Guelph Gryphons (1) | 1–0 | McGill Martlets | University of Prince Edward Island | Charlottetown, Prince Edward Island | |
| 2020 | Cancelled due to the COVID-19 pandemic | | | University of Prince Edward Island | Charlottetown, Prince Edward Island | |
| 2021 | Cancelled due to the COVID-19 pandemic | | | Université de Montréal | Montreal, Quebec | |
| 2022 | Concordia Stingers (3) | 4–0 | Nipissing Lakers | University of Prince Edward Island | Charlottetown, Prince Edward Island | |
| 2023 | Mount Royal Cougars (1) | 4–3 (OT) | Concordia Stingers | Université de Montréal | Montreal, Quebec | |
| 2024 | Concordia Stingers (4) | 3–1 | Toronto Varsity Blues | University of Saskatchewan | Saskatoon, Saskatchewan | |
| 2025 | Bishop's Gaiters (1) | 3–0 | Waterloo Warriors | University of Waterloo | Waterloo, Ontario | |
| 2026 | Montreal Carabins (3) | 5–2 | Concordia Stingers | University of Waterloo | Waterloo, Ontario | |
| 2027 | | | | University of New Brunswick | Fredericton, New Brunswick | |
| 2028 | | | | St. Francis Xavier University | Antigonish, Nova Scotia | |
| 2029 | | | | University of British Columbia | Vancouver, British Columbia | |
| 2030 | | | | Trinity Western University | Langley, British Columbia | |

== Appearances ==
| Appearances | Team | Wins | Losses | Win % |
|---|---|---|---|---|
| 10 | Alberta Pandas | 8 | 2 | .800 |
| 9 | McGill Martlets | 4 | 6 | .400 |
| 6 | Concordia Stingers | 4 | 2 | .667 |
| 5 | Montreal Carabins | 3 | 2 | .600 |
| 5 | Wilfrid Laurier Golden Hawks | 1 | 4 | .200 |
| 4 | Toronto Varsity Blues | 1 | 3 | .250 |
| 2 | Calgary Dinos | 1 | 1 | 0.500 |
| 2 | Western Mustangs | 1 | 1 | 0.500 |
| 1 | Manitoba Bisons | 1 | 0 | 1.000 |
| 1 | Guelph Gryphons | 1 | 0 | 1.000 |
| 1 | Mount Royal Cougars | 1 | 0 | 1.000 |
| 1 | Regina Cougars | 0 | 1 | .000 |
| 1 | Ottawa Gee-Gees | 0 | 1 | .000 |
| 1 | St. Francis Xavier X-Women | 0 | 1 | .000 |
| 1 | UBC Thunderbirds | 0 | 1 | .000 |

== Ontario champions pre-1998 national championship ==
Previously, the only significant Canadian university women's ice hockey championship was the determination of the champions in the large Ontario associations, as the few non-Ontario teams tended to play against local or regional community teams rather than in organized interuniversity associations. In Ontario, the Women's Intercollegiate Athletic Union (WIAU) existed from 1921–22 to 1970–71, then merged with the Ontario-Quebec University Athletic Association to forme the Ontario Women's Interuniversity Athletic Association (OWIAA), competing from 1971–72 to 1996–97. The OWIAA awarded the Dr. Judy McCaw trophy to its annual champion.

=== WIAU champions (1921–1971) ===
1921–22 University of Toronto
1922–23 University of Toronto
1923–24 University of Toronto
1924–25 University of Toronto
1925–26 Queen's University
1926–27 University of Toronto
1927–28 University of Toronto
1928–29 University of Toronto
1929–30 University of Toronto
1930–31 Queen's University
1931–32 University of Toronto
1932–33 University of Toronto
1933–34 University of Toronto
1934–35 University of Toronto
1935–36 University of Toronto

1936 to 1948 No official competition

1948–49 University of Toronto
1949–50 University of Toronto
1950–51 University of Toronto

1951 to 1960 No official competition

1960–61 University of Toronto
1961–62 University of Toronto
1962–63 University of Toronto / Queen's University
1963–64 University of Toronto
1964–65 University of Toronto
1965–66 University of Toronto
1966–67 University of Guelph
1967–68 University of Guelph
1968–69 University of Guelph
1969–70 University of Guelph
1970–71 McMaster University

=== OWIAA champions (1972–1997) ===
1971–72 University of Guelph
1972–73 Queen's University
1973–74 University of Guelph
1974–75 Queen's University
1975–76 McMaster University
1976–77 Queen's University
1977–78 McMaster University
1978–79 Queen's University
1979–80 University of Toronto
1980–81 University of Toronto
1981–82 University of Toronto
1982–83 York University
1983–84 University of Toronto
1984–85 University of Toronto
1985–86 University of Toronto
1986–87 York University
1987–88 University of Toronto
1988–89 University of Toronto
1989–90 University of Toronto
1990–91 University of Toronto
1991–92 University of Toronto
1992–93 University of Toronto
1993–94 Université de Toronto
1994–95 University of Guelph
1995–96 University of Toronto
1996–97 York University
