= Toronto Varsity Blues women's ice hockey =

Women's ice hockey team of the University of Toronto

- University: University of Toronto
- Conference: OUA; East Division
- Governing Body: U Sports
- Head coach: Vicky Sunohara; 11th season, 203–96–31
- Assistant coaches: Peter McBride; Safiya Muharuma; Kelly O'Hanlon; Jessica Turi; Dave Wakabayashi (goalie)
- Arena: Varsity Arena; Toronto
- Colors: U of T Blue and white
- Fight song: "The Blue and White"
- Mascot: True Blue

U Sports tournament champions
- 2001

U Sports tournament appearances
- 1998, 1999, 2000, 2001, 2002, 2003, 2006, 2013, 2019, 2020, 2023, 2024, 2025

Conference tournament champions
- 1980, 1981, 1982, 1984, 1985, 1986, 1988, 1989, 1990, 1991, 1992, 1993, 1994, 1996, 2000, 2001, 2003, 2020, 2023, 2025

The Toronto Varsity Blues women's ice hockey team is an ice hockey team that represents the University of Toronto in the Ontario University Athletics conference of U Sports. Three-time Olympic medalist Vicky Sunohara has served as head coach since the 2011–12 season.

== History ==
Varsity ladies hockey team c. 1910

On December 12, 1922, the Lady Blues joined the Ladies Ontario Hockey Association (LOHA) and paid dues of eleven dollars: six dollars association fee, five dollars one time fee. The Lady Blues were the LOHA Provincial Champions in 1924. In 1925, the Lady Blues withdrew from the LOHA, taking issue with certain unsatisfactory aspects of competition and debate as to the acceptable definition of womanhood.

In 1993, (although the Lady Blues won 13 of the last 15 provincial championships), a task force recommended that the University of Toronto cut the team for financial reasons. Justine Blainey, a member of the team, organized a "Save the Team" night that raised over $8,000. She personally called 100 alumni during a one-week fundraising blitz. Blainey had previously earned national recognition as she endured five different court cases before finally having her case heard by the Supreme Court of Canada in 1986 because the Metro Toronto Hockey League denied her the opportunity to play hockey for them in 1981.

During the 2000–01 regular season, the Lady Blues accumulated an undefeated record with 22 wins and no losses or ties. They outscored all opponents by a 114–14 margin. In the OUA playoffs, the Lady Blues defeated Toronto rival York University by a 4–1 mark and shut out Laurier 5–0 to win the OUA championship.

Heading into the 2001 National Championships, the Lady Blues were seeded Number 1 overall. The Lady Blues first game was a resounding 12–1 victory over the hosting Calgary Dinos. In the semifinal, the Lady Blues would proceed to eliminate the McGill Martlets by a 4–1 tally. The championship game was a closer affair, with the Lady Blues besting the Regina Cougars in a 4–3 triumph. It was the Lady Blues first national championship in CIS women’s hockey. Of note, the Varsity Blues managed to defeat every other top team in the nation that season. The teams that were defeated included Regina, Concordia, Alberta, McGill and Saskatchewan, as the Lady Blues finished with an overall win loss record of 35–0–0.

=== Notable games ===
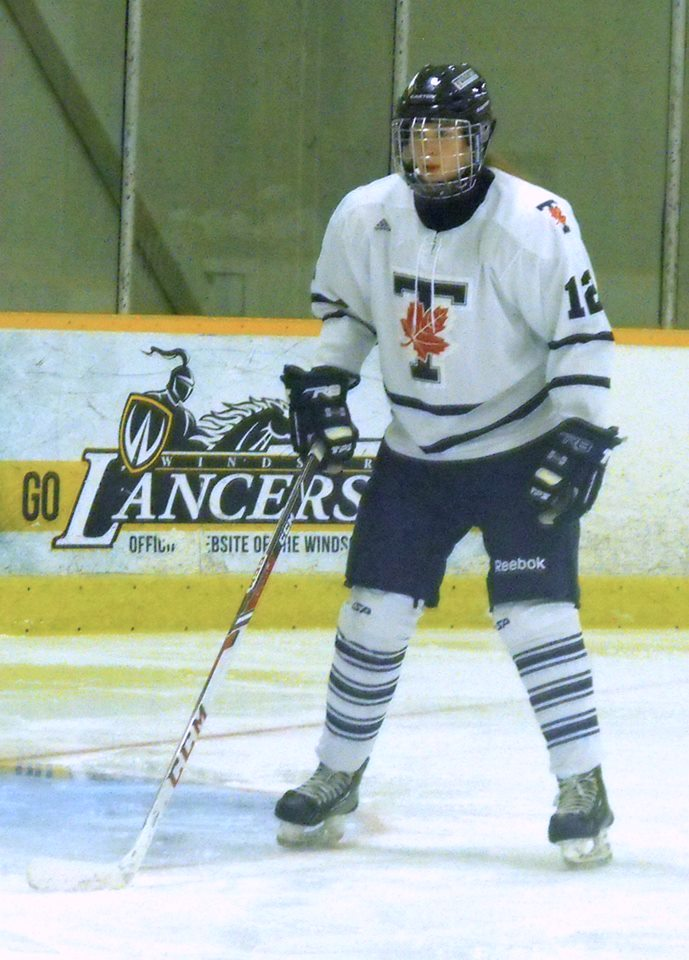
Blues player in 2014

- On February 25, 1997, a little-known rule denies the Blues’ their second consecutive title. The OWIAA gold medal game in Waterloo, Ontario resulted in a controversial finish. Lady Blues player Jayna Hefford scored 23 seconds into overtime in the OWIAA gold medal game against the York Yeowomen at Waterloo Memorial Arena. The Lady Blues believed they had claimed the provincial championship.

OWIAA league rules indicated that the first five-minute overtime session in a playoff game must be played in its entirety (as a regular period). It was advised that the game would continue after Hefford's goal. York University (known as the Yeowomen at the time) tied the game with 1:47 left in the first overtime. Sari Krooks broke in on the right wing and scored on Keely Brown.

A second overtime period began and this overtime period was classified as sudden death. York skater Shanley White took advantage of a Lady Blues clearing error. She scored on the error and York prevailed by a 3–2 mark in double overtime to claim the OWIAA gold medal. The Lady Blues loss ended the Blues' undefeated season, and gave York its first championship in 10 years.

The two played a scoreless opening period, but the Lady Blues scored ten seconds into the second period when Hefford passed to linemate Laura Schuler, and beat goalie Debra Ferguson. York tied the game 26 seconds into the third period which led into overtime. Despite winning the silver medal, the Lady Blues ended its regular season with a 13–0–2 record. In the semifinal, the Lady Blues defeated the Guelph Gryphons by a 4–1 tally. In that game, Laura Schuler had a hat trick, while Hefford added three assists.

- On February 11, 2000, the Ontario University Athletics women's ice hockey program saw its longest game take place. The University of Toronto's Rhonda Mitchell scored on a 35-foot slap shot. It was the 5:07 mark of the eighth period and the Varsity Blues defeated the York Lions women's ice hockey program. Although the victory allowed the U of T to advance to the OUA gold medal game, it was the longest in the history of Canadian women's hockey. The game lasted over five hours and ten minutes. York's player of the game was goaltender Debra Ferguson, who made 63 saves over 125 minutes in net.

=== Season team scoring champion ===
= Indicates league leader

Year	Player	GP	G	A	PTS	PIM
2025-26	Abby Whitworth	26	20	9	29	18
2024-25	Ashley Delahey	26	9	16	25	4
2023-24	Taylor Trussler	26	10	13	23	28

== U Sports Tournament results ==
In Progress

Year	Seed	Round	Opponent	Result
2019	#8	First Round; Consolation Bracket; Fifth place game	#1 Alberta #4 St. Thomas #6 Manitoba	L 3–2; W 2–1; L 2–0

== Player awards and honours ==
- Alison Houston, 2001 CIS Goaltending Champion (0.40 GAA)
- Karen Hughes, CIS coach of the Year, 2001
- Jen Rawson, 2001 CIS Tournament MVP honors

=== University Awards ===
- 2020 Toronto Varsity Blues Female Rookie of the Year: Natasha Athanasakos
- 2014 Toronto Varsity Blues Female Athlete of the Year: Nicole Kesteris

=== OUA Awards ===
- Karen Hughes, 2001 OUA Coach of the Year
- Jen Rawson, 2001 OUA all-star
- Jen Rawson, 2001 OUA Athlete of the Year
- Vicky Sunohara, 2021,2022,2023 OUA Female Coach of the Year

==== OUA East Awards ====
- Gabrielle De Serres, 2021-22 OUA East Division Most Valuable Player
- Erica Fryer, 2021-22 OUA East Goaltender of the Year
- Abby Howland, 2021-22 OUA East Rookie of the Year
- Kaitlyn McKnight, Tor, 2025-26 OUA East True Sport Award

==== OUA All-Stars ====
- Taylor Day – Forward – 2017 OUA First-Team All-Star
- Cristine Chao – Defence – 2018-19 and 2019-20 OUA First-Team All-Star
- Ashley Delahey – Forward – 2024-25 OUA Second-Team All-Star

==== OUA All-Rookie ====
- Gabrielle De Serres, 2017-18 OUA All-Rookie Team

==== OUA Most Sportsmanlike ====
Player	Year
Cristine Chao	2018/19

=== U Sports Awards ===
- Erica Fryer, U Sports Athlete of the Month, January 2020

==== Marion Hilliard Award ====
The Marion Hilliard Award recognizes excellence in an OUA women's hockey student-athlete in three areas: hockey, academics and community involvement.

- Bridget Bates, 1999
- Jenny McRae, 2003
- Sue McCutcheon, 2005

==== All-Canadian honours ====
First Team

- Urszula May, 1999 CIS First Team All-Canadian
- Erica Fryer, 2021-22 First Team All-Canadian

Second Team

- Ali MacMillan, 1998 CIS Second Team All-Canadian
- Sue Anne Van Damme, 1998 CIS Second Team All-Canadian
- Jen Rawson, 2000 CIS Second Team All-Canadian
- Heather Vance, 2000 CIS Second Team All-Canadian
- Alison Houston, 2001 CIS Second Team All-Canadian
- Susie Laska, 2001 CIS Second Team All-Canadian
- Jen Rawson, 2001 CIS Second Team All-Canadian
- Alison Houston, 2003 CIS Second Team All-Canadian
- Kim Malcher, 2003 CIS Second Team All-Canadian
- Safiya Muharuma, 2004 CIS Second Team All-Canadian
- Kim Devereaux, 2006 CIS Second Team All-Canadian
- Stephanie Lockert, 2007 CIS Second Team All-Canadian

==== U Sports All-Rookie ====
- Cristine Chao, 2015–16 U Sports All-Rookie
- Gabrielle De Serres, 2017-18 U SPORTS All-Rookie Team

== International ==
- Annie Del Guidice Canada: 2009 Winter Universiade
- Karen Hughes General Manager Canada: 2009 Winter Universiade
- Nicole Kesteris Canada: 2015 Winter Universiade
- Lauren Straatman Canada: Ice hockey at the 2019 Winter Universiade
- Gabrielle De Serres, Defense, Canada: 2021 Winter Universiade - Event cancelled due to the COVID-19 pandemic and Omicron variant
- Cristine Chao Republic of China: 2024 IIHF Women's World Championships, Division II, Group A
- Emma Potter, Defense, Canada: Ice hockey at the 2025 Winter World University Games (silver)
- Scout Watkins Southward, Forward, Canada: Ice hockey at the 2025 Winter World University Games (silver)

=== Lady Blues in Olympic hockey ===
Player	Position	Event	Result
Lesley Reddon	Goaltender	1998 Winter Olympics	Silver
Lori Dupuis	Forward	1998 Winter Olympics	Silver
Lori Dupuis	Forward	2002 Winter Olympics	Gold
Jayna Hefford	Forward	1998 Winter Olympics	Silver
Jayna Hefford	Forward	2002 Winter Olympics	Gold
Jayna Hefford	Forward	2006 Winter Olympics	Silver
Jayna Hefford	Forward	2010 Winter Olympics	Gold
Laura Schuler	Forward	1998 Winter Olympics	Silver
Vicky Sunohara	Forward	1998 Winter Olympics	Silver
Vicky Sunohara	Forward	2002 Winter Olympics	Gold
Vicky Sunohara	Forward	2006 Winter Olympics	Gold
Gabrielle De Serres	Defense	2026 Winter Olympics	5th Place, Group B

== Blues in pro hockey ==
Player	Pos.	Team(s)	League(s)	Titles
Cristine Chao	D	Toronto Six	PHF	
Gabrielle De Serres	D	Montreal Force	PHF	
Lori Dupuis	F	Brampton Thunder	NWHL; CWHL	2008 CWHL championship
Erica Fryer	G	SDE Hockey	SWHL	
Jayna Hefford	F	Brampton Thunder	NWHL; CWHL	Gold medal: 2006 Esso Women's Nationals; 2008 CWHL championship
Andria Hunter	F	Mississauga Chiefs	NWHL	
Vicky Sunohara	F	Brampton Thunder	NWHL; CWHL	Gold medal: 2006 Esso Women's Nationals; 2008 CWHL championship
Karolina Urban	F	Calgary Inferno; Markham Thunder	CWHL	2018 Clarkson Cup
Scout Watkins Southward	F	Almtuna IS	NDHL	

The following players were selected in the 2010 CWHL Draft.

Player	Pos.	Team	Draft	Pick
Mary Modeste	F	Toronto Furies	2010	#39
Heather Logan-Sprenger	F	Brampton Thunder	2010	#71

== See also ==
- Ontario University Athletics women's ice hockey
