= Guelph Gryphons women's ice hockey =

Women's ice hockey team

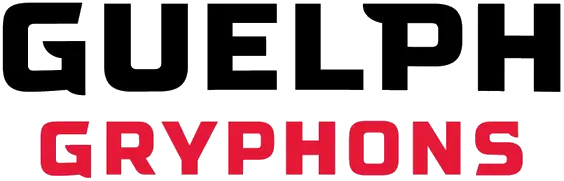
- University: University of Guelph
- Conference: OUA; West Division
- Head coach: Katie Mora; 3rd season
- Arena: Gryphon Centre; Guelph, Ontario
- Colors: Red, Gold, and Black

U Sports tournament champions
- 2019

Conference tournament champions
- 1972, 1974, 1995, 1998, 2016, 2017, 2019

The Guelph Gryphons are an ice hockey team that represents the University of Guelph. They compete in the Ontario University Athletics Conference in U Sports. The program has yielded seven McCaw Cup conference championships and one Golden Path Trophy national championship, coming in 2019.

== History ==
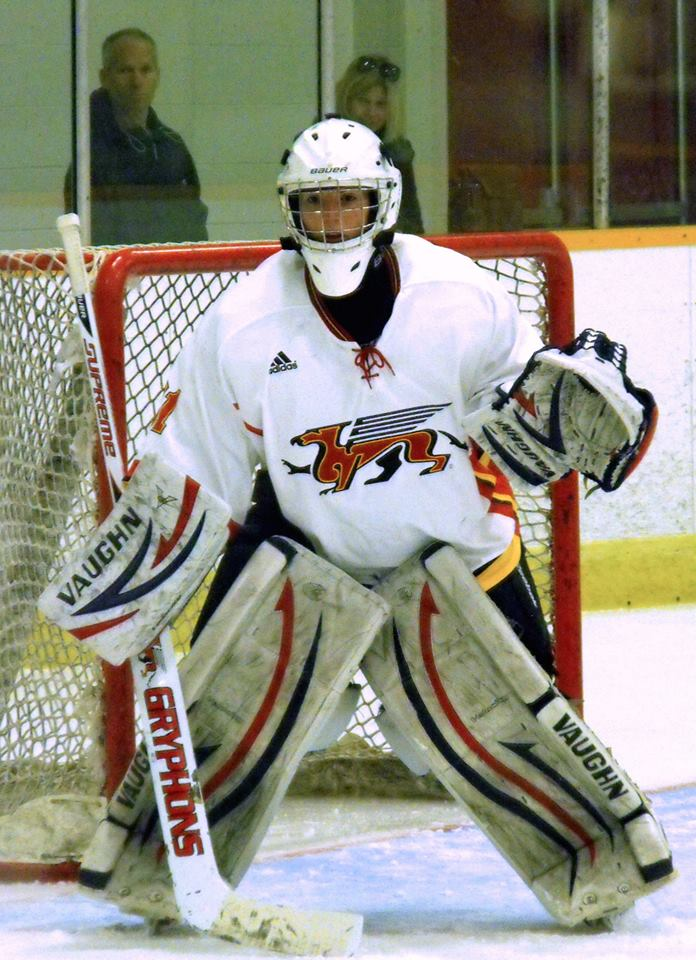
Gryphons goalie, Valerie Lamenta in 2014-2015.

On March 3, 2011, a postseason match between the Queen's Golden Gaels and the Guelph Gryphons became the longest collegiate hockey game, male or female, Canadian or American — on record. The match began on Wednesday and it only ended on Thursday. The duration of the match was 167 minutes and 14 seconds when Queen's forward Morgan McHaffie placed a rebound past Gryphons goalie Danielle Skoufranis.

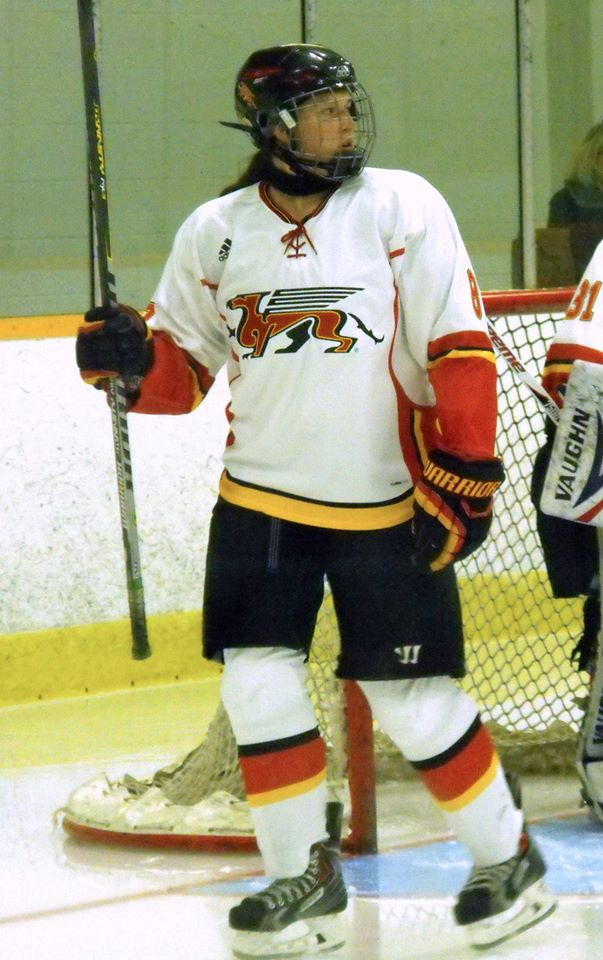
Gryphons player, Kelly Gribbons in 2014.

In the 2011-12 campaign, Jackie Sollis was named an OUA First-Team All-Star. She led all defenders in the OUA with 23 points, while forward Erin Small finished second in OUA scoring with 34 points. Along with goaltender Stephanie Nehring, the two were named OUA Second Team all-stars. Freshman goaltender Nehring was one of only two goalies to reach double digits in wins with 14. Her 1.89 goals against average ranked second overall in the OUA.

Jessica Pinkerton was named to the OUA All-Rookie team, as she led all OUA rookies with 14 goals in her initial campaign. In addition, her 26 points were second overall among OUA rookies. Her nine power play goals led all scorers in the OUA, as the Gryphons enjoyed a second-place finish in the standings.

On November 17, 2015, the Guelph Gryphons were ranked No. 1 nationally for the first time in school history with a 7-2 record.

=== Season team scoring champion ===
Year	Player	GP	G	A	PTS	PIM	OUA rank
2019–20	Karli Shell	24	4	11	15	4	23rd
2018–19	Kaitlin Lowy	22	13	12	25	16	3rd
2017–18	Kaitlin Lowy	24	15	9	24	22	3rd
2016-17							
2015-16							
2014-15							

=== USports Tournament results ===
In Progress

Year	Seed	Round	Opponent	Result
2019	#3	First Round; Semi-Finals; Gold medal game	#6 Manitoba #2 Montreal #5 McGill	W 3–2; W 5–0; W 1–0

== International ==
Player	Position	Nation	Event	Result
Cassie Campbell	Defense	Canada	1998 Winter Olympics	Silver
Cassie Campbell	Forward	Canada	2002 Winter Olympics	Gold
Cassie Campbell	Forward	Canada	2006 Winter Olympics	Gold
Jacalyn Sollis	Defense	Canada	2011 Winter Universiade	Gold
Jessica Zerafa	Forward	Canada	2011 Winter Universiade	Gold
Katherine Bailey	Defense	Canada	2017 Winter Universiade	Silver
Kelly Gribbons	Forward	Canada	2017 Winter Universiade	Silver
Valerie Lamenta	Goaltender	Canada	2017 Winter Universiade	Silver
Jaime Magoffin	Forward	Canada	Ice hockey at the 2025 Winter World University Games	2nd place, silver medalist(s)
Martina Fedel	Goaltender	Italy	2026 Winter Olympics	3rd Place, Group B

== Awards and honours ==
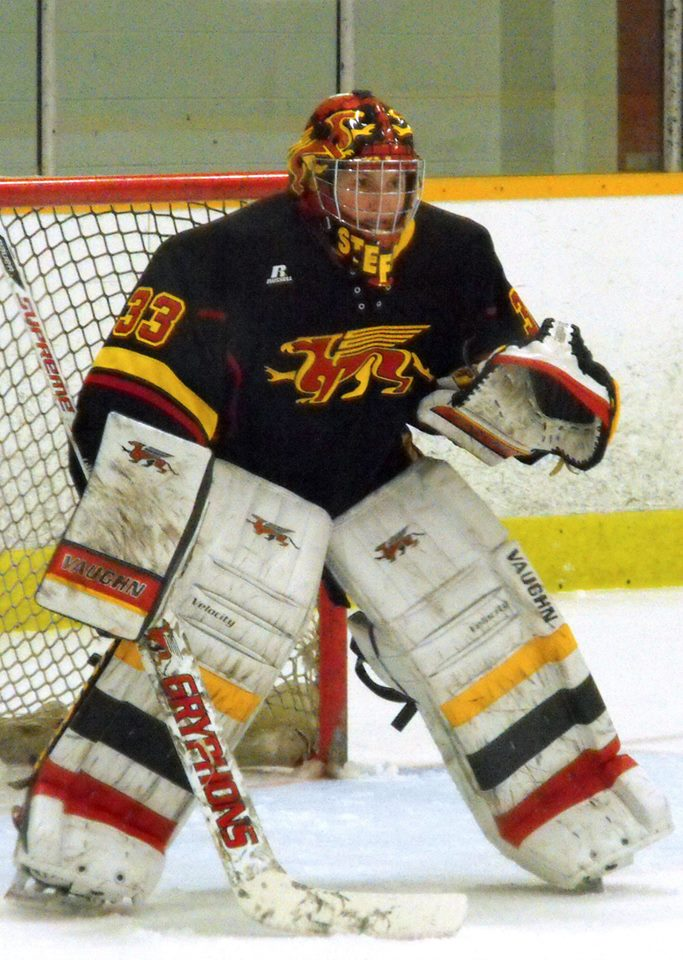
Gryphons goalie, Stephanie Nehring in 2014-15 season.

- Rachel Flanagan: 2021 BFL Coach of the Year Award - Provincial Winner for Ontario (High Performance Category)

=== OUA honours ===
- 2019 OUA Female Coach of the Year: Rachel Flanagan
- 2019 OUA Female Team of the Year
- 2024 OUA Coach of the Year: Katie Mora

==== OUA West honours ====
- Katherine Heard, Guelph, 2025-26 OUA West MVP
- Arielle MacDonald, 2025-26 OUA West True Sport Award

==== OUA Goaltender of the Year ====
Player	Year
Valerie Lamenta	2018-19
Martina Fedel	2023-24

==== OUA Most Sportsmanlike ====
Player	Year
Claire Merrick	2017-18
Miranda Lantz	2019-20

==== OUA All-Stars ====
Player	Position	Season
Tina Vlad	Defense	1981-82
Sue Scherer	Defense	1982-83
Sue Scherer	Defense	1983-84
Jenny Patterson	Forward	1989-90
Sue Patterson	Forward	1989-90
Jules Stevens	Forward	1989-90
Sue Patterson	Forward	1990-91
Marci Hickmott	Goaltender	1991-92
Nancy Deschamps	Forward	1991-92
Liz Duval	Forward	1993-94
Jennifer Dewar	Goaltender	1994-95
Jackie Sollis	Defence	2011-12
Amanda Parkins	Forward	2012-13
Jessica Pinkerton	Forward	2013-14
Katherine Bailey	Defence	2016-17
Valerie Lamenta	Goaltender	2016-17
Martina Fedel	Goaltender	2023-24

Second Team

Player	Position	Season
Marci Hickmott	Goaltender	1990-91
Kelli Chittick	Defense	1990-91
Elizabeth Duval	Defense	1990-91
Helen Knowles	Defense	1991-92
Stephanie Slade	Goaltender	1992-93
Cassie Campbell	Defense	1992-93
Liz Duval	Forward	1992-93
Michelle Hanes	Forward	1992-93
Helen Knowles	Forward	1992-93
Jennifer Dewar	Goaltender	1993-94
Sarah Applegarth	Defense	1993-94
Cassie Campbell	Forward	1993-94
Michelle Holmes	Forward	1993-94
Cassie Campbell	Forward	1994-95
Liz Duval	Defense	1994-95
Tanja Vlahovich	Defense	1999-2000
Erin Small	Forward	2011-12
Jessica Zerafa	Forward	2010-11
Jackie Sollis	Defence	2010-11
Stephanie Nehring	Goalie	2011-12
Jessica Pinkerton	Forward	2012-13
Christine Grant	Forward	2012-13
Stephanie Nehring	Goalie	2013-14
Christine Grant	Forward	2013-14
Leigh Shilton	Defence	2014-15
Jessica Pinkerton	Forward	2014-15
Kaitlin Lowy	Forward	2016-17
Kelly Gribbons	Forward	2016-17
Martina Fedel	Goaltender	2024-25

==== OUA All-Rookie ====
- Jessica Pinkerton, Forward: 2011-12
- Amanda Parkins, Forward: 2012-13
- Christine Grant, Forward: 2012-13

=== USports Awards ===
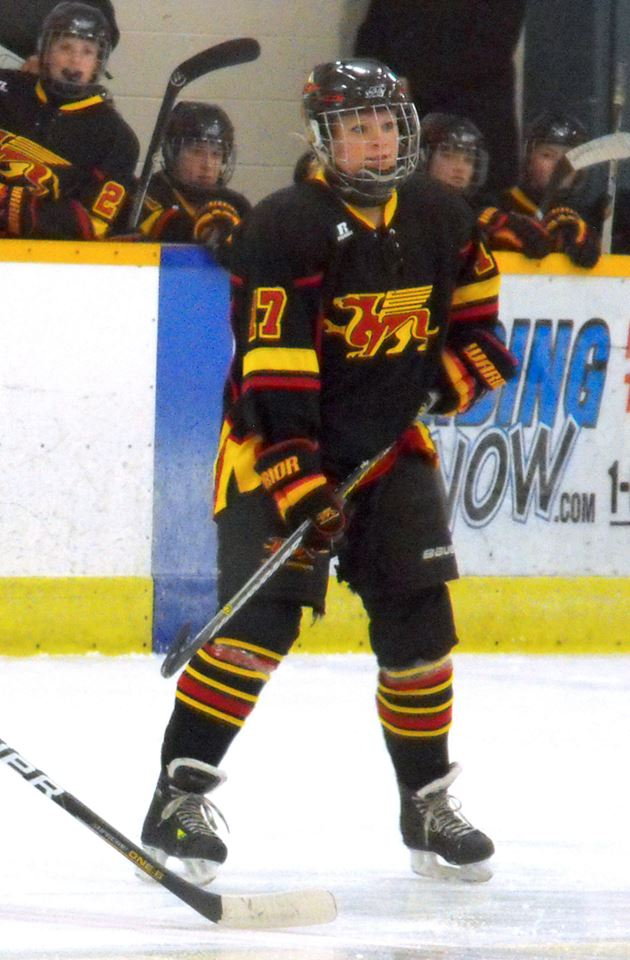
Gryphons player, Averi Nooren in 2014-15 season.

- Valerie Lamenta, 2015-16 Brodrick Trophy Winner

==== USports All-Canadians ====
- Nicole (Coley) Dosser, 1998, CIAU, All-Canadian Team, Forward
- Christine Grant, 2013 USports Rookie of the Year
- Amanda Parkins, 2012-13 USports First Team All-Star
- Valerie Lamenta, 2015-16 USports First Team All-Star
- Averi Nooren, 2015-16 USports Second Team All-Star
- Leigh Shilton, 2015-16 USports Second Team All-Star
- Martina Fedel, 2024 U Sports First Team All-Canadian

=== University Awards ===
- 2024 Guelph Gryphons Female Athlete of the Year: Martina Fedel
- 2020 Gunner Obrascovs Trainer of the Year: Rileigh Arsenault
- 2019 W.F. Mitchell Sportswoman of the Year: Valerie Lamenta
- 2019 Gryphie of the Year (for best moment of the varsity season): Kaitlin Lowy - scoring gold medal winning goal at U Sports Nationals
- 2016 Guelph Gryphons Athlete of the Year: Valérie Lamenta
- 2016 Shirley Peterson Award (3-year Most Improved Player): Kelly Gribbons
- 2015 W.F. Mitchell Sportswoman of the Year: Katie Mora

Athlete of the Week

- Valerie Lamenta: Guelph Gryphons Athlete of the Week (Awarded March 4, 2019)

=== Team Awards ===
==== Rookie of the Year ====
- 2019-20: Hannah Tait
- 2018-19: Lauren Ianni
- 2017-18: Molly Crossman
- 2016-17: Sydney Davison
- 2015-16: Claire Merrick
- 2014-15: Katherine Bailey

==== Most Valuable Player ====
- 2019-20: Karli Shell
- 2018-19: Claire Merrick
- 2017-18: Kaitlin Lowy
- 2016-17: Katherine Bailey
- 2015-16: Valerie Lamenta and Jessica Pinkerton
- 2014-15: Katie Mora

== Gryphons in pro hockey ==
Player	Position	Team(s)	League(s)	Year(s)	Title(s)
Cassie Campbell	Defence	Beatrice Aeros; Calgary Oval X-Treme	NWHL		
Nicole (Coley) Dosser	Forward	Brampton Thunder	NHWL		
Elysia Desmier	Forward	Brampton Thunder	CWHL		
Valerie Lamenta	Goaltender	Kanadai Magyar Hokiklub (KMH) Budapest	EWHL		2019-20 OB1 championship 2019-20 EWHL championship 2019-20 Superleague title
Kaitlin Lowy	Forward	Kanadai Magyar Hokiklub (KMH) Budapest	EWHL		2019-20 OB1 championship 2019-20 EWHL championship 2019-20 Superleague title
Jessica Pinkerton	Forward	Melbourne Ice	AWIHL		Joan McKowen Memorial Trophy AWIHL Champion
