= 2009–10 Canadian Interuniversity Sport women's ice hockey season =

Ice hockey season

The 2009-10 CIS women's ice hockey season began in October 2009 and ended with the Alberta Pandas claiming the 2010 CIS National Championship.

== Season outlook ==
=== Pre-season polls ===
1. McGill
2. Wilfrid Laurier
3. Manitoba
4. Moncton
5. Alberta
6. St. Francis Xavier (StFX)
7. Guelph
8. York
9. Toronto
10. Saskatchewan

== Exhibition ==
=== NCAA Exhibition ===
Throughout the season, various NCAA schools played Canadian Interuniversity Sport hockey teams in exhibition games.

Date	Location	NCAA school	CIS team	Score
Fri. Sept 25	Detroit	Wayne State	York	Wayne State, 3–2
Fri. Sept 25	Grand Forks, ND	North Dakota	Manitoba	North Dakota, 3–1
Sat. Sept 26	Erie, PA	Mercyhurst	Guelph	Mercyhurst, 10–0
Sat. Sept 26	Columbus, OH	Ohio State	Wilfrid Laurier	Tie, 1–1 (Ohio State scores in shootout)
Sat. Sept 26	Grand Forks, ND	North Dakota	Manitoba	Manitoba, 3–2
Sun. Sept 27	Matthews Arena	Northeastern	McGill	McGill, 3–1
Sun, Sep 27	Pittsburgh, PA	Robert Morris	Wilfrid Laurier	RMU, 4–0
Sun. Sept 27	Tennity Ice Pavilion	Syracuse	Guelph	Guelph, 3–1
Sun. Sept 27	Dwyer Arena	Niagara	Brock University	Niagara, 5–2
Sat. Oct 3	Appleton Arena	St. Lawrence	McGill	St. Lawrence, 2–1
Sun. Oct 4	Burlington, VT	Vermont	McGill	McGill, 2–1
Fri. Oct 23	Hanover, NH	Dartmouth	McGill	St. Lawrence, 2–1
Sun. Oct 25	New Haven, CT	Yale	McGill	Yale, 4–2
Sat. Jan 2	Orono, ME	Maine	Moncton	Maine, 4–2
Sun. Jan 3	Orono, ME	Maine	Moncton	Maine, 6–3

== Regular season ==
- February 16: The undefeated McGill Martlets were the No. 1 ranked team for the 38th consecutive week, dating back to Nov. 6, 2007.

=== Polls ===
As of February 16

- 1. McGill (18-0-0) / (1)
- 2. Wilfrid Laurier (26-0-1) / (2)
- 3. Alberta (21-1-0) / (3)
- 4. Moncton (18-2-1) / (4)
- 5. StFX (17-2-3) / (5)
- 6. Manitoba (18-4-0) / (6)
- 7. Queen's (19-5-3) / (7)
- 8. Saskatchewan (14-5-3) / (10)
- 9. York (17-9-1) / (9)
- 10. Montreal (12-5-1) / (8)

=== Standings ===
==== Atlantic University Sport ====
2009–10 Atlantic University Sport standings
	Conference						
	GP	W	L	OTL	GF	GA	PTS
Moncton Aigles Bleues	24	21	2	1	95	45	43
St. Francis Xavier X-Women	24	18	2	4	85	36	40
Saint Mary's Huskies	24	13	10	1	80	80	27
St. Thomas Tommies	24	12	10	2	51	57	26
Dalhousie Tigers	24	11	13	0	66	64	22
UPEI Panthers	24	7	16	1	45	88	15
Mount Allison Mounties	24	2	21	1	37	89	5

==== Canada West ====
In Canada West, an overtime loss is worth 1 point

2009–10 Canada West standings
	Conference						
	GP	W	L	OTL	PTS	GF	GA
Alberta Pandas	24	23	1	0	46	94	21
Manitoba Bisons	24	18	6	0	36	63	46
Saskatchewan Huskies	24	16	8	3	35	88	50
Regina Cougars	24	7	17	6	20	43	83
UBC Thunderbirds	24	8	16	1	17	48	67
Calgary Dinos	24	7	17	2	16	35	68
Lethbridge Pronghorns	24	5	19	4	14	36	72

- The top four teams qualify for the playoffs

==== OUA ====
2009–10 OUA standings
	Conference						
	GP	W	L	OTL	PTS	GF	GA
Wilfried Laurier Golden Hawks	27	26	1	1	53	98	23
Queen's Golden Gaels	27	19	8	3	41	93	63
York Lions	27	17	10	1	35	78	61
Guelph Gryphons	27	14	13	3	31	89	66
Toronto Varsity Blues	27	14	13	2	30	89	89
Windsor Lancers	27	13	14	0	26	64	68
Brock Badgers	27	11	16	3	25	55	79
Western Mustangs	27	10	17	3	23	66	87
Waterloo Warriors	27	7	20	3	17	49	90
UOIT Ridgebacks	27	4	23	5	13	54	109

==== QSSF ====
2009–10 QSSF
	Conference						
	GP	W	L	T	GF	GA	PTS
McGill Martlets	20	20	0	0	79	18	40
Montréal Carabins	20	13	6	1	58	55	27
Ottawa Ge-Gees	20	8	11	1	51	67	17
Carleton Ravens	20	8	12	0	39	47	16
Concordia Stingers	20	1	16	3	35	75	5

== 2010 Olympics ==
The following active and former CIS players represented their respective countries in the women's ice hockey tournament at the 2010 Winter Olympics.

Player	CIS school	Nationality	Position	Goals	Assists	Points	Finish
Jayna Hefford	Toronto	Canada	Forward	5	7	12	Gold
Charline Labonté	McGill	Canada	Goaltender	0	0	0	Gold
Lucrèce Nussbaum	St. Thomas	Switzerland	Defense	1	2	3	6th Place
Kim St. Pierre	McGill	Canada	Goaltender	0	0	0	Gold
Catherine Ward	McGill	Canada	Defense	1	3	4	Gold
Hayley Wickenheiser	Calgary	Canada	Forward	2	9	11	Gold

== Stats leaders ==
=== Skaters ===
Player	School	GP	Pts	G	A	PIM	+/-	PPG	SHG	GWG	GTG	Shots	Pct.
Mariève Provost	Moncton	24	51	29	22	14	+32	8	1	3	1	169	.172
Breanne George	Sask	24	46	28	18	28	+28	17	0	5	0	89	.315
Tarin Podloski	Alberta	24	43	22	21	12	+54	10	0	5	0	104	.212
Elizabeth Kench	Guelph	27	38	12	26	38	+0	4	0	0	0	0	-
Julie Paetsch	Sask	24	36	10	26	22	+19	4	0	1	0	55	.182
Becky Conroy	Queen's	27	34	17	17	32	+0	5	1	5	0	0	-
Jocelyn Leblanc	Dalhousie	20	34	16	18	32	+15	5	1	3	0	86	.186
Ellie Seedhouse	Western Ont.	27	32	15	17	24	+0	7	1	3	0	0	-
Ann-Sophie Bettez	McGill	18	31	22	9	4	+2	6	3	5	0 0	-	
Leah Copeland	Alberta	24	31	11	20	28	+38	7	0	6	0	91	.121
Vanessa Davidson	McGill	20	31	13	18	18	+2	5	1	3	0	0	-
Dayna Kanis	Guelph	25	31	10	21	16	+1	2	0	1	0	0	-
Kelsey Thomson	Guelph	27	31	14	17	14	+0	2	1	2	0	0	-
Valerie Boisclair	Moncton	19	30	13	17	8	+17	5	0	6	0	70	.186

==== AUS conference leaders ====
Player	School	Pos	GP	Goals	Ast	Pts
Marieve Provost	Moncton	F	24	29	22	51
Jocelyn LeBlanc	Dalhousie	F	20	16	18	34
Valerie Boisclair	UDM	F	19	13	17	30
Kori Cheverie	St. Mary's	F	24	19	11	30
Kristine Labrie	UDM	F	24	11	19	30
Jessica Shanahan	St. FX	F	24	13	15	28
Lauren McCusker	St. Mary's	F	24	11	17	28

== Postseason ==
=== CIS Tournament ===
- The Alberta Pandas defeated the McGill Martlets to claim the 2010 Canadian Interuniversity Championship. The Pandas ended the Martlets historic 86 game unbeaten streak against CIS opponents. Said streak dated back to December 30 of 2007. It was the Pandas who also beat the Martlets back on that date. Alberta had notched a 2–1 shootout victory. With the win, the Pandas also snapped the Martlets 20 game unbeaten streak in the postseason. This streak is also linked to the Alberta Pandas who claimed a 4–0 win in the 2007 CIS gold medal game. In the 2010 Championship Game, Melody Howard's unassisted goal at 6:09 in the first period held up as the game-winning goal. Forward Alana Cabana scored the second goal of the game.

Date	Opponent	Location	Score
March 14	McGill Martlets	Antigonish, NS	2–0

== Awards and honors ==
- Liz Knox, Laurier, Brodrick Trophy (CIS Player of the Year)
- Caitlin MacDonald, Manitoba, CIS Rookie of the Year
- Kaitlyn McNutt, Dalhousie, CIS Marion Hillard Award (achievements as athlete, student and volunteer)
  - Christine Allen, Ottawa, QSSF Marion Hillard Award
  - Veronica Johnston, Western Mustangs, OUA Marion Hillard Award
  - Stacy Corfield, Manitoba Bisons, Hockey West Marion Hillard Award
- Steve Kook, Saskatchewan, CIS Coach of the Year

=== CIS All-Star teams ===
==== First Team ====
- Goaltender, Liz Knox, Laurier
- Defence, Cathy Chartrand, McGill
- Defence, Caitlin MacDonald, Manitoba
- Forward, Ann-Sophie Bettez, McGill
- Forward, Mariève Provost, Moncton
- Forward, Breanne George, Saskatchewan

==== Second Team ====
- Goaltender, Stacey Corfield, Manitoba
- Defence, Kelsey Webster, York
- Defence, Nicole Pratt, Alberta
- Forward, Tarin Podloski, Alberta
- Forward, Vanessa Davidson, McGill
- Forward, Rebecca Conroy, Queen's

=== CIS All-Rookie team ===
- Goaltender, Mel Dodd-Moher, Queen's
- Defence, Caitlin MacDonald, Manitoba
- Defence, Rayna Cruickshank, UBC
- Forward, Kim Deschênes, Montreal
- Forward, Candice Styles, Laurier
- Forward, Abygail Laking, StFX

=== CIS Tournament awards ===
- CIS Tournament championship player of the game: Jennifer Jubb, Alberta
- CIS Tournament MVP: Stephanie Ramsay, Alberta
- CIS Tournament All-Stars
  - Goaltender: Dana Vinge, Alberta
  - Defense: Stephanie Ramsay, Alberta
  - Forward: Leah Copeland, Alberta

=== AUS All-Stars ===
==== First Team ====
- G, Kathy Desjardins, Moncton Aigles Bleues
- D, Suzanne Fenerty, St. Francis Xavier X-Women
- D, Marilyn Hay, St. Francis Xavier X-Women
- F, Mariève Provost, Moncton Aigles Bleues
- F, Kori Cheverie, Saint Mary's Huskies
- F, Jocelyn LeBlanc, Dalhousie Tigers

==== Second Team ====
- F, Valérie Boisclair, Moncton
- F, Jessica Shanahan, StFX
- F, Carolyn Campbell, StFX
- D, Laura Shearer, Dalhousie
- D, Lucrece Nussbaum, St. Thomas
- G, Meghan Corley-Byrne, Mount Allison

==== All-Rookie Team ====
- F, Fielding Montgomery, Dalhousie
- F, Abygail Laking, StFX
- F, Amy Kelbaugh, St. Thomas
- D, Rebecca Mosher, Saint Mary's
- D, Jenna Downey, StFX
- G, Kristin Wolfe, St. Thomas

=== Hockey West All-Stars ===
==== First Team ====
- F: Breanne George, Saskatchewan
- F: Tarin Podloski, Alberta
- F: Leah Copeland, Alberta
- D: Caitlin MacDonald, Manitoba
- D: Nicole Pratt, Alberta
- G: Stacey Corfield, Manitoba
