= Liz Knox =

Canadian ice hockey player

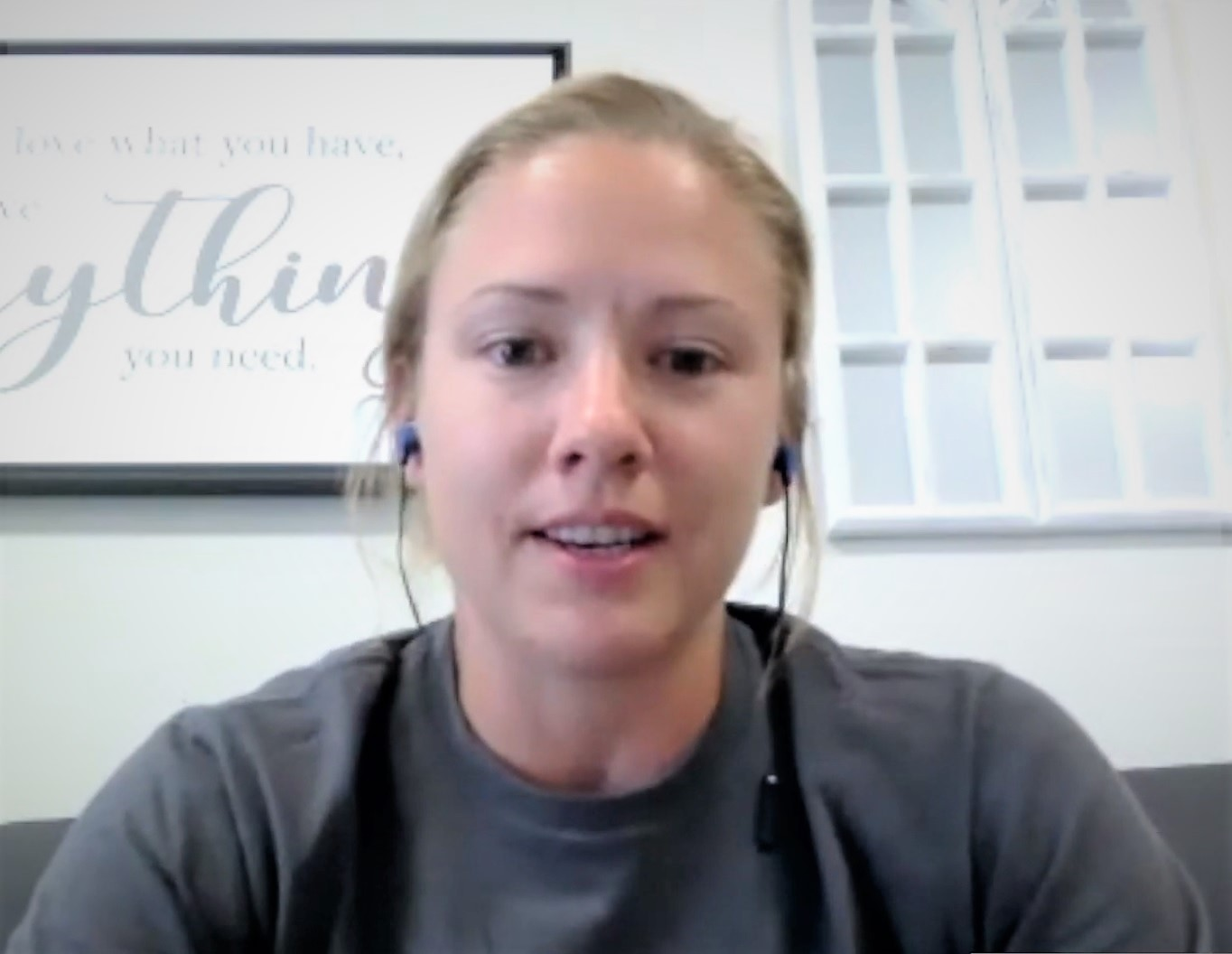
- Knox on Sports Talk with Erica Ayala in 2020
- Born: June 9, 1988 (age 38) Whitchurch-Stouffville, Ontario, Canada
- Height: 5 ft 4 in (163 cm)
- Weight: 135 lb (61 kg; 9 st 9 lb)
- Position: Goaltender
- Caught: Left
- Played for: PWHPA; Markham Thunder; Melbourne Ice; Laurier Golden Hawks
- National team: Canada
- Playing career: 2006–2019
Medal record
Women's ice hockey
Representing Canada
Winter Universiade
Gold medal – first place	2011 Turkey	Tournament

Elizabeth Knox (born June 9, 1988) is a Canadian retired ice hockey goaltender. She ranks second all-time among Canadian Women's Hockey League (CWHL) goaltenders for games played and won the Clarkson Cup in 2018. An outspoken leader among players, she served as chair of the CWHL Player's Association and was a founding board member of the Professional Women's Hockey Players Association (PWHPA) after the collapse of the CWHL. Knox is currently a member of the executive committee of the Professional Women's Hockey League Players Association (PWHLPA).

== Playing career ==
=== Ontario University Athletics ===
Knox attended Wilfrid Laurier University (WLU) in Waterloo, Ontario, and went on to become one of the most decorated players in Wilfrid Laurier Golden Hawks women's ice hockey program history.

==== 2006–07 ====
Heading into the 2006–07 season, Knox joined a squad that featured established goalie Morgan Wielgosz and had won three consecutive Ontario University Athletics (OUA) championships, as well as the 2004–05 Canadian Interuniversity Sport (CIS) national championship (CIS is now known as U Sports). Knox generally split Laurier's goaltending minutes with Wielgosz as a collegiate rookie, featuring in 12 regular season games. She made her unofficial debut with 38 saves in a 2–1 exhibition win over NCAA Division I team Ohio State on September 30, 2006, and her official one two weeks later in a 5–2 victory against Windsor. Other highlights included a 2–1 win over the Queen's Golden Gaels in a battle of teams ranked in the national top five on November 4, 2006. In that contest, Knox stopped a Golden Gaels penalty shot in overtime before Laurier's Laurissa Kenworthy grabbed the winning goal 13 seconds later. Knox went on to pick up her first career shutout against Windsor three weeks later. Wielgosz, however, received most of the work through the OUA and CIS playoffs, though Knox did see action three times in the postseason – very briefly in an OUA championship win (Laurier's fourth straight league title) over Queen's while Wielgosz addressed an equipment issue, then more significantly in relief during a loss to the University of Alberta Pandas that eliminated the Golden Hawks from CIS national championship contention, and finally during a CIS third-place game loss to the University of Manitoba.

==== 2007–2011 ====
By her second year, Knox emerged as the regular starter, a status she would retain for the rest of her time at Laurier. After taking an uncharacteristic loss early in the season to Guelph (she would drop just seven regular season decisions during her entire WLU career), Knox rebounded with a run of shutouts – five by the end of November – including one against a nationally ranked University of Toronto team. Those shutouts were part of a 14-game Laurier unbeaten streak that didn't end until December 29, 2007, against, in a bit of foreshadowing, powerhouse McGill University. Knox and WLU picked right back up from there however, with the team plowing through CIS competition to the tune of a 25–3–2 regular season record and the goalie posting a 17–2–1 mark with a 0.945 save percentage and an 0.97 goals against average.

As good as Knox was during the regular season, she was even better during the OUA and CIS playoffs. While the Golden Hawks won their first six post-season games (including sweeps of Queen's and Toronto en route to a fifth straight OUA title), the results were generally hard-earned. Knox, in fact, had to be perfect in the clinching games of both OUA series with 16 and 20 saves, respectively, as both ended with 1–0 scorelines.

On March 10, 2010, Knox became the first Golden Hawks player in the history of the women's program to win the Brodrick Trophy, the CIS Player of the Year award.

On September 23, 2016, Knox was inducted into WLU's Golden Hawk Hall of Fame.

=== Professional ===
==== First CWHL stint ====
Following graduation, Knox was selected 18th overall in the 2011 CWHL Draft by the Brampton Thunder, part of a fruitful class for the team that also included Courtney Birchard, Tara Gray and Vicki Bendus.

Almost immediately, she became the workhorse goalie for the Thunder, playing in 20 of 27 regular season games and helping Brampton to an 18–7–2 and a robust third-place finish in the standings. For Knox, notable milestones included her first professional win on October 29, 2011, against Team Alberta (now known as the Calgary Inferno) and her first shutout, on March 4, 2012, against a loaded Boston Blades team that included several United States national team regulars like Kelli Stack, Gigi Marvin and Kacey Bellamy.

==== AWIHL ====
For the 2013–14 season, Knox joined the Melbourne Ice women's hockey club of the Australian Women's Ice Hockey League (AWIHL) and became half of a formidable tandem with Australian national team goaltender Jodie Walker. During the AWIHL's short regular season (the league only has four teams, with each playing four games per opponent), Knox played in eight of 12 games (winning all eight), and posted a dominant 1.00 goals against average with a 0.964 save percentage to help the Ice to a first-place finish in the standings, with 38 of a possible 42 points. She was even better in the league final against the Adelaide Adrenaline, posting consecutive 32-save shutouts in 2–0 victories to help the Ice to their third AWIHL title. Including the pair of contests in the final, Knox ended the year with a shutout streak of 207:17 – all against the Adrenaline, as her last three regular-season appearances were also against Melbourne's eventual championship opponent – and led the league in most major statistical categories including wins, goals against average and save percentage.

==== Return to the CWHL ====
Knox won the Clarkson Cup on March 25, 2018, with the Markham Thunder. The team had relocated from Brampton that season, and the CWHL had also expanded to seven teams (from five) with the addition of two teams based in Shenzhen, China.

In 2019, Knox ranked second among all CWHL players in an online vote, gaining the opportunity to serve as a captain at the 4th Canadian Women's Hockey League All-Star Game.

==== PWHPA ====
When the CWHL announced its collapse in May 2019, Knox was one of the leading players in the scramble to organize a response, culminating in the formation of the Professional Women's Hockey Players Association (PWHPA).

In September 2020, Knox announced her resignation from the board of the PWHPA to ensure that Sarah Nurse, one of the few black players in the PWHPA, could have a seat on the board. Knox remained an advisor to the PWHPA and called for the organization to do more to combat racism in hockey. After the PWHPA achieved its goal of launching a new, unified professional women's league in the Professional Women's Hockey League (PWHL) in the summer of 2023, Knox was named to the executive committee of the PWHL Players Association, the league's labour union. She is joined on the committee by Nurse and three other PWHL players.

=== International ===
==== Winter Universiade ====
During her final season at Laurier, Knox was selected to compete for Team Canada at the 2011 Winter Universiade in Erzurum, Turkey, along with two of her Golden Hawks teammates – defenceman Alicia Martin and forward Candice Styles. The 2011 tournament was just the second time that the biennial Universiade included women's ice hockey, and Knox helped Canada successfully defend its gold medal from 2009.

She appeared in four of Canada's seven games, winning all four, and was among the tournament leaders in most statistical categories including goals against average (0.80, good for second among qualifying goaltenders) and save percentage (.921, also second). Two of Knox's four games were routs, as she saw just four shots in a 14–0 win against Great Britain and played the first two periods of an 8–1 victory over the United States in the semifinals. Her defining outings were her first and last of the tournament, both against a Finland squad packed with stars from the senior Finnish women's national ice hockey team, including Anne Helin, Saara Tuominen Niemi, Anniina Rajahuhta, Venla Hovi and Anna Vanhatalo, all of whom had been a part of the bronze medal team at the 2010 Winter Olympics prior to the 2011 Universiade.

During the round robin stage of the tournament, on January 27, 2011, Knox and Vanhatalo engaged in a classic goaltending duel. Hovi gave the Finns a 1–0 lead midway through the contest before Mariève Provost answered on the power play with 1:29 left in regulation to force overtime. After a scoreless five-minute extra period, things proceeded to a shootout. There, Knox denied all five shooters she faced, including Helin and Sari Kärnä twice each, and Tuominen once. Vanhatalo matched her save for save until Canada's fifth shooter, Ellie Seedhouse, gave her side the victory. The teams met once again in the gold medal match, although things were a bit less dramatic there, as Canada jumped out to a 3–0 lead early in the second period and cruised to a 4–1 win, helped in part by 20 Knox saves.

==== IIHF 12 Nations Tournament ====
Knox received a second call from Hockey Canada six months after the gold medal at the 2011 Winter Universiade and competed at the one-off 2011 IIHF 12 Nations Tournament, sharing the Canadian crease with fellow eventual CWHL netminders Geneviève Lacasse and Christina Kessler. The stated goal of the 12 Nations Tournament was to enhance the competitive level of developing women's hockey countries ahead of the 2014 Winter Olympics and accordingly, no medals were awarded. Canada went 4–2–0 in the round-robin-style showcase, with Knox playing twice and winning both of her games. On August 25, 2011, she had an easy outing against Russia, making 15 saves in a 16–1 blowout. Five days later, Knox made 16 stops as Canada pulled off yet another dramatic win over Finland by a 3–2 score. In that contest, Finland carried a 2–1 lead past the halfway point of the third period before goals by Meghan Agosta and Jennifer Wakefield, the latter with 2:00 remaining, flipped the result.

== Personal life ==
Knox was born on June 9, 1988, in Stouffville, in Ontario's Greater Toronto Area.

In addition to ice hockey, she serves as a volunteer firefighter in Whitchurch-Stouffville, the greater municipality of her hometown.

== Career statistics ==
=== College and professional ===
			Regular season									Playoffs
Season	Team	League	GP	W	L	T/OT	MIN	GA	SO	GAA	SV%	GP	W	L	MIN	GA	SO	GAA	SV%
2006–07	Laurier Golden Hawks	CIS	12	9	1	1	685.12	15	2	1.31	.934	3	1	2	89.50	4	0	2.68	.867
2007–08	Laurier Golden Hawks	CIS	20	17	2	1	1172.04	19	7	0.97	.945	7	6	1	430.18	6	3	0.84	.963
2008–09	Laurier Golden Hawks	CIS	23	22	1	0	1351.68	21	10	0.93	.953	7	5	1	355.38	9	0	1.52	.899
2009–10	Laurier Golden Hawks	CIS	25	22	1	0	1482.34	22	11	0.89	.960	9	6	1	411.14	5	3	0.73	.964
2010–11	Laurier Golden Hawks	CIS	22	20	2	0	1282.25	21	5	0.95	.955	5	0	3	219.64	8	0	2.19	.890
2011–12	Brampton Thunder	CWHL	20	13	6	1	1206.10	59	1	2.94	.828	4	2	2	240.00	10	0	2.50	—
2012–13	Brampton Thunder	CWHL	11	4	6	1	615.20	43	0	4.19	.831	1	0	1	69.98	4	0	3.43	.886
2013–14	Melbourne Ice	AWIHL	8	8	0	0	408.00	8	2	1.00	.964	2	2	0	102.00	0	2	0.00	1.000
2014–15	Brampton Thunder	CWHL	11	2	6	1	596.83	39	1	3.92	.888	—	—	—	—	—	—	—	—
2015–16	Brampton Thunder	CWHL	10	7	2	0	502.00	21	2	2.51	.924	0	0	0	0.00	0	0	0.00	—
2016–17	Brampton Thunder	CWHL	13	5	6	0	659.00	29	4	2.64	.899	1	0	1	59.00	4	0	4.04	.882
CIS totals			102	90	7	2	5973.43	98	35	0.98	.952	31	18	8	1505.84	32	6	1.28	.935
CWHL totals			65	31	26	3	3579.13	191	8	3.20	.874	6	2	4	368.98	18	0	2.93	.884

=== International ===
Year	Team	Event	Result	GP	W	L	OT	MIN	GA	SO	GAA	SV%
2011	Canada	WU	1st place, gold medalist(s)	4	4	0	0	225.00	3	1	0.80	.921
2011	Canada	12N	N/A	2	2	0	0	120.00	3	0	1.50	.912
Totals				6	6	0	0	345.00	6	1	1.04	.917

== Awards and honours ==
=== Canadian Interuniversity Sport ===
- 2007–08 Championship Tournament All-Star
- 2009–10 Player of the Year
- 2009–10 First Team All-Canadian

=== Ontario University Athletics ===
- 2006–07 OUA Champion
- 2007–08 OUA Champion
- 2007–08 Second Team All-Star
- 2008–09 OUA Champion
- 2008–09 First Team All-Star
- 2009–10 OUA Champion
- 2009–10 Player of the Year
- 2009–10 First Team All-Star
- 2010–11 Second Team All-Star

=== Wilfrid Laurier University ===
- 2006–07 Cindy Eadie Award (team rookie of the year)
- Laurier Athlete of the Week (October 22, 2007)
- Laurier Athlete of the Week (December 3, 2007)
- Laurier Athlete of the Week (March 10, 2008)
- Laurier Athlete of the Week (November 16, 2009)
- Laurier Athlete of the Week (February 1, 2010)
- Laurier Athlete of the Week (March 8, 2010)
- 2009–10 Laurier Athlete of the Year
- 2009–10 Lisa Backman Award (team most valuable player)
- 2009–10 President's Award
- 2009–10 Luke Fusco Academic Athletic Achievement Award
- 2009–10 Outstanding Women of Laurier Award
