= 2012 CWHL Draft =

Canadian Women's Hockey League draft

General information
- Date: July 14, 2012
- Location: Mississauga, Ontario

Overview
- First selection: Hillary Pattenden

The 2012 CWHL Draft was held on July 14, 2012 in Mississauga. Team Alberta held the first overall pick for the first time in franchise history. The club selected Hillary Pattenden with the first pick overall.

== Registration ==
Prospective players must register on the CWHL Draft web page to be considered for the upcoming draft.

Prospect	Position	Nationality	Former team
Kathy Desjardins	Goaltender	Canada	Moncton Aigles Bleues
Caroline Hu	Goaltender	United States	Amherst College
Charline Labonté	Goaltender	Canada	McGill Martlets
Geneviève Lacasse	Goaltender	Canada	Providence Friars
Amanda Mazzotta	Goaltender	Canada	Cornell Big Red
Hillary Pattenden	Goaltender	Canada	Mercyhurst Lakers
Lauren Patterson	Goaltender	United States	Golden Rams
Florence Schelling	Goaltender	Switzerland	Northeastern Huskies

Prospect	Position	Nationality	Former team
Virginie Bouetz Andrieu	Defense	France	Bruleurs de Loup de Grenoble
Andrea Boras	Defense	Canada	Alberta Pandas
Kasey Boucher	Defense	United States	Boston Terriers
Suzanne Fenerty	Defense	Canada	St. Francis Xavier X-Women
Meghan George	Defense	Canada	Concordia Stingers
Brittany Haverstock	Defense	Canada	Wisconsin Badgers
Jocelyne Larocque	Defense	Canada	Manitoba Maple Leafs
Claire McKimm	Defense	Canada	Aurora Jr. Panthers
Taylor Metcalfe	Defense	Canada	Syracuse Orange
Amber Overguard	Defense	Canada	Cornell Big Red
Zoya Polunina	Defense	Russia	Tornado (Russian League)
Kimberly Riley	Defense	United States	Evanston Tigers (WCHL)
Anne Schleper	Defense	United States	Minnesota Golden Gophers
Jen Schoullis	Defense	United States	Minnesota Golden Gophers
Whitney Sears	Defense	Canada	Bemidji State Beavers
Dania Simmonds	Defense	Canada	Union Dutchwomen
Charissa Stadnyk	Defense	Canada	Princeton Tigers
Tara Watchorn	Defense	Canada	BU Terriers

Prospect	Position	Nationality	Former team
Shelby Ballendine	Forward	Canada	Lethbridge Pronghorns
Ann-Sophie Bettez	Forward	Canada	McGill Martlets
Shanelle Bjorndahl	Forward	Canada	Calgary Flyers Midget AAA
Bailey Bram	Forward	Canada	Mercyhurst Lakers
Leah Copeland	Forward	Canada	Alberta Pandas
Lauren Cromartie	Forward	Canada	Union Dutchwomen
Sara Dagenais-Everell	Forward		North Dakota
Erin Duggan	Forward	Canada	Yale Bulldogs
Kendra Dunlop	Forward	Canada	RPI Engineers
Stephanie Gastman	Forward	Canada	Mississauga Chiefs (PWHL)
Kelsea Hepburn	Forward	Canada	
Haley Irwin	Forward	Canada	Minnesota-Duluth Bulldogs
Rebecca Johnston	Forward	Canada	Cornell Big Red
Chelsea Karpenko	Forward	Canada	Cornell Big Red
Leanne Kisil	Forward	Canada	Manitoba Bisons
Hilary Knight	Forward	United States	Wisconsin Badgers
Kristine LaBrie	Forward	Canada	Moncton Aigles Bleues; Vienna Flyers (EWHL)
Stephanie Madziar	Forward	United States	
Laura McIntosh	Forward	Canada	Ohio State Buckeyes
Sarah Moe	Forward		Gustavus Adolphus; Manitoba Maple Leafs; Minnesota Whitecaps
Kateřina Mrázová	Forward	Czech Republic	Czech National Team
Kendice Ogilvie	Forward	Canada	Cornell
Jordanna Peroff	Forward	Canada	McGill Martlets
Carolyne Prevost	Forward	Canada	Wisconsin Badgers
Mariève Provost	Forward	Canada	Aigles Bleues de Moncton; Vienna Flyers
Catherine Rancourt	Forward	Canada	Concordia Stingers
Ingrid Renli	Forward	Norway	Vaalerenga Ishockey, Oslo
Katherine Shirriff	Forward	Canada	Wilfrid Laurier
Natalie Spooner	Forward	Canada	Ohio State Buckeyes
Kelley Steadman	Forward	United States	Mercyhurst Lakers
Jaime Teichman	Forward	Canada	Strathmore Rockies
Karolina Urban	Forward	Canada	Toronto Lady Blues
Lisa Weiss	Forward	United States	Boston Lasers (NESHL)
Jenn Wakefield	Forward	Canada	Boston University Terriers
Catherine White	Forward	Canada	Cornell Big Red
Bianca Zuber	Forward	Canada	Southern Alberta Institute of Technology

== Top 25 picks ==
#	Player	Position	College	Team
1	Hillary Pattenden	Goaltender	Mercyhurst	Alberta
2	Rebecca Johnston	Forward	Cornell	Toronto
3	Haley Irwin	Forward	Minnesota-Duluth	Brampton
4	Hilary Knight	Forward	Wisconsin	Boston
5	Charline Labonte	Goaltender	McGill	Montreal
6	Jocelyne Larocque	Defense	Minnesota-Duluth	Alberta
7	Natalie Spooner	Forward	Ohio State	Toronto
8	Bailey Bram	Forward	Mercyhurst	Brampton
9	Geneviève Lacasse	Goaltender	Providence	Boston
10	Ann-Sophie Bettez	Forward	McGill	Montreal
11	Tara Watchorn	Defense	Boston University	Alberta
12	Jennifer Wakefield	Forward	Boston University	Toronto
13	Laura MacIntosh	Forward	Ohio State	Brampton
14	Anne Schleper	Defense	Minnesota	Boston
15	Carolyne Prevost	Forward	Wisconsin	Montreal
16	Brittany Haverstock	Forward	Cornell	Alberta
17	Catherine White	Forward	Cornell	Toronto
18	Charissa Stadnyk	Defense	Princeton	Brampton
19	Jen Schoullis	Forward	Minnesota	Boston
20	Florence Schelling	Goaltender	Northeastern	Montreal
21	Leah Copeland	Forward	Alberta Pandas	Alberta
22	Jordanna Peroff	Forward	McGill	Toronto Furies
23	Suzanne Fenerty	Forward	St. Francis Xavier	Brampton
24	Kelley Steadman	Forward	Mercyhurst	Boston
25	Marieve Provost	Forward	Moncton	Montreal

== Draft picks by team ==
= Indicates Olympian

= Indicates former NCAA player

= Indicates former CIS player

=== Alberta ===
#	Player	Position	College
1	Hillary Pattenden	Goaltender	Mercyhurst
6	Jocelyne Larocque	Defense	Minnesota-Duluth
11	Tara Watchorn	Defense	Boston University
16	Brittany Haverstock	Forward	Cornell
21	Leah Copeland	Forward	Alberta Pandas

=== Boston ===
#	Player	Position	College
4	Hilary Knight	Forward	Wisconsin
9	Geneviève Lacasse	Goaltender	Providence
14	Anne Schleper	Defense	Minnesota
19	Jen Schoullis	Forward	Minnesota
24	Kelley Steadman	Forward	Mercyhurst

=== Brampton ===
#	Player	Position	College
18	Charissa Stadnyk	Defense	Princeton
23	Suzanne Fenerty	Forward	St. Francis Xavier

=== Montreal ===
#	Player	Position	College
5	Charline Labonte	Goaltender	McGill
10	Ann-Sophie Bettez	Forward	McGill
15	Carolyne Prevost	Forward	Wisconsin
20	Florence Schelling	Goaltender	Northeastern
25	Marieve Provost	Forward	Moncton

=== Toronto ===
#	Player	Position	College
2	Rebecca Johnston	Forward	Cornell
17	Catherine White	Forward	Cornell
22	Jordanna Peroff	Forward	McGill
