= Moncton Aigles Bleues women's ice hockey =

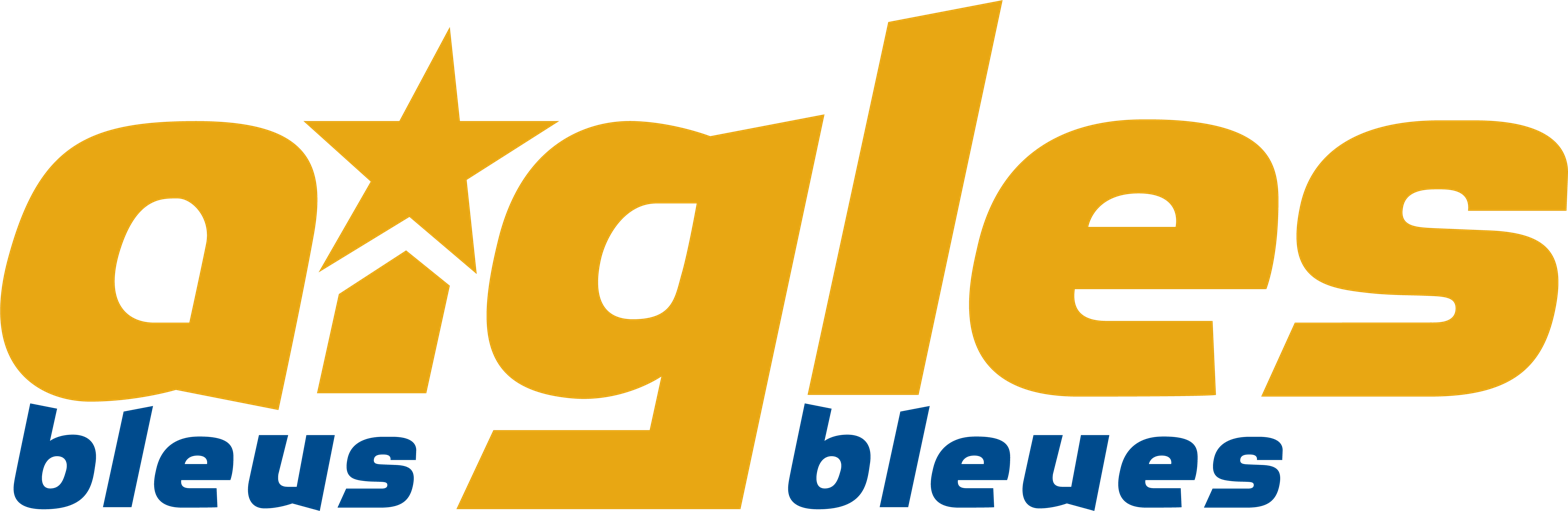
- University: Université de Moncton
- Conference: AUS
- Head coach: Marc-André Côté
- Arena: J. Louis Levesque Arena; Moncton, New Brunswick
- Colors: Blue and Gold

U Sports tournament appearances
- 2007, 2009, 2014, 2015

Conference tournament champions
- 2007, 2009, 2014

Conference regular season champions
- 2009, 2010

The Moncton Aigles Bleues women's ice hockey team represents the University of Moncton in U Sports women's ice hockey. The Aigles Bleues compete in the Atlantic University Sport (AUS) Conference in the U Sports athletic association. The program has won three conference championships and has made four national championship tournament appearances with their best finish occurring in 2009 with a bronze medal victory.

== History ==
At the midway point of the 2008-09 CIS season, Mariève Provost led the CIS in scoring with 15 goals and 27 assists in 11 conference games. She represented Canada in their entry at the 2009 World Universidade, which was the first appearance for the Canadian women in ice hockey at the Universidade. Provost finished the seven game tournament with seven points (four goals, three assists).

On March 22, 2009, les Aigles Bleues participated in the bronze medal game of the 2009 CIS National Championships. Provost scored the game-winner in a shootout with a 3–2 victory over the Manitoba Bisons. Moncton was the fourth-seeded team in the tournament and captured the Atlantic conference's first-ever medal at the CIS women's hockey championship.

In the first 12 conference games of the 2010-11 CIS season, Provost led the CIS in scoring with 30 points (14-16-30). At the midway point of that season, she ranked third in CIS all-time scoring with 205 points (105-100-205).

=== All-time points record ===
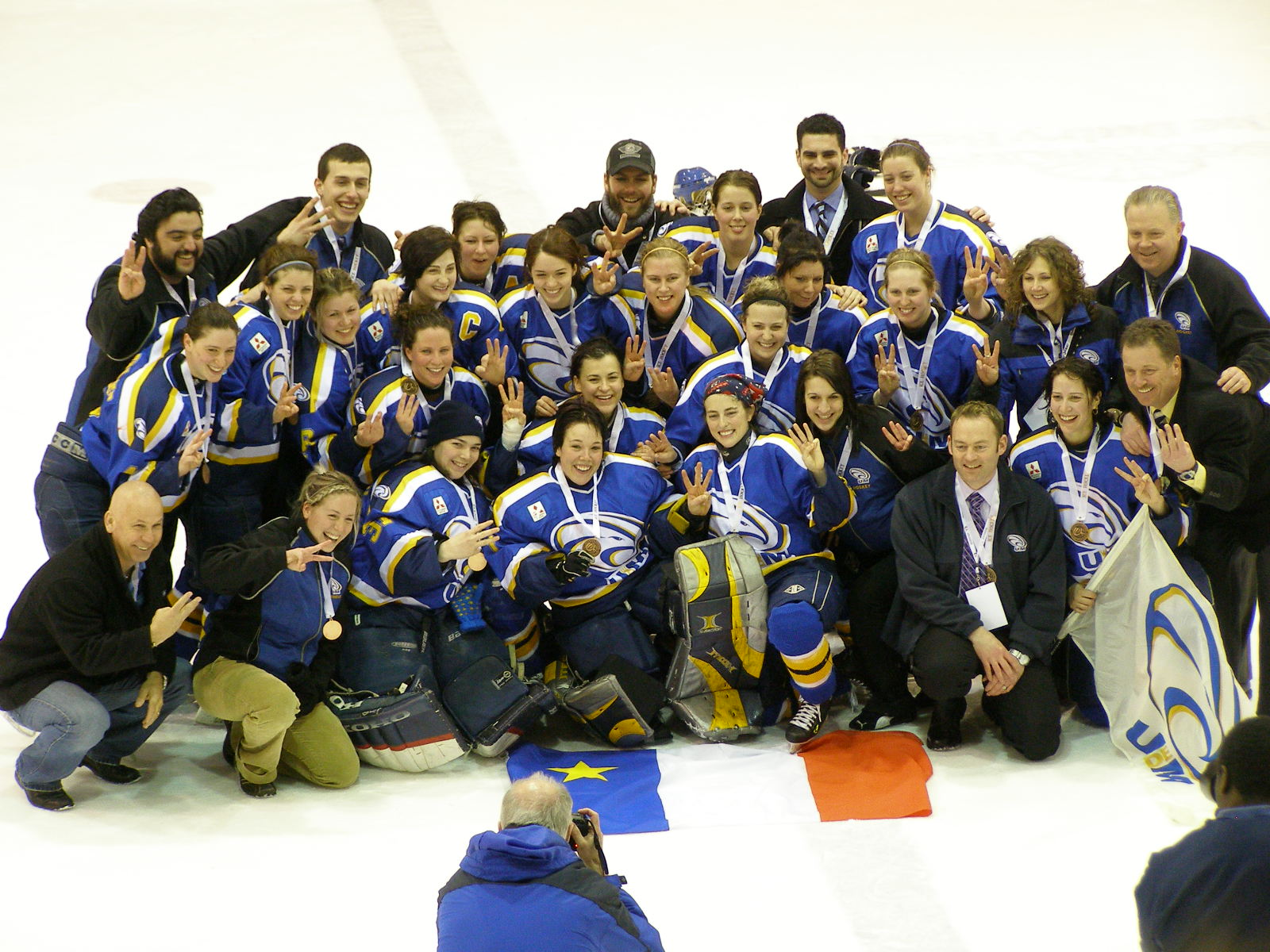
The Aigles Bleues following their Bronze Medal win in the 2009 national championship.

The weekend of February 12 and 13, 2011, Marieve Provost earned two goals and three assists over two games to increase her career totals to 108 goals and 107 assists. She reached 215 points in 102 regular season matches. Heading into the weekend, she was tied with former Alberta Pandas player Danielle Bourgeois with 106 goals. She required four points to break the scoring record of 213 set by Tarin Podloski, also from Alberta. She scored her 107th career goal on February 12, during the power play in a 6-2 road win over Saint Mary's. In the third period of that same game, she tied Podloski's point record. Provost logged an assist on Valérie Boisclair's goal. The following day, she assisted on Kristine Labrie's goal to pick up career point 214, against St. Thomas. In overtime, Provost would assist on another goal by Boisclair, the game winning tally.

Player	Seasons	GP	G	A	PTS
Mariève Provost	2006-07 to 2010-11	105	110	110	220
Valerie Boisclair	2006-07 to 2010-11	103	64	88	152
Johannie Thibeault	2006-07 to 2008-09, 2010-11 to 2011-12	110	50	79	129
Kristine Labrie	2006-07 to 2010-11	114	45	78	123
Katryne Villeneuve	2014-15 to 2018-19	120	53	65	118
Marie Pier Arsenault	2011-12 to 2015-16	116	52	56	108

=== Recent results ===
Year	GP	W	L	T	OTL	Pts	Std	Postseason
2002-03	14	7	5	0	2	16	4th	Won AUS Quarter-Finals (7–3) vs. UNB Varsity Reds; Lost AUS Semi-Finals (8–3) vs. Saint Mary's Huskies
2003-04	14	4	8	1	1	10	6th	Lost AUS Quarter-Finals (9–1) vs. Dalhousie Tigers
2004-05	18	2	16	0	0	4	7th	Did not qualify for playoffs
2005-06	21	1	20	0	0	2	8th	Did not qualify for playoffs
2006-07	21	18	3	–	0	36	2nd	Won AUS Semi-Finals (4–1) vs. Saint Mary's Huskies; Won AUS Championship (4–0) vs. St. Thomas Tommies; Lost CIS Pool A Game 1 (4–1) vs. Manitoba Bisons; Lost CIS Pool A Game 2 (8–0) vs. McGill Martlets; Won CIS 5th Place game (6–5) vs. Ottawa Gee-Gees
2007-08	21	15	5	–	1	31	3rd	Won AUS Quarter-Finals (8–1) vs. UNB Varsity Reds; Lost AUS Semi-Finals (3–2) vs. Saint Mary's Huskies
2008-09	24	22	0	–	2	46	1st	Won AUS Semi-Finals (4–1) vs. Dalhousie Tigers; Won AUS Championship (4–2) vs. St. Francis Xavier X-Women; Won CIS Pool B Game 1 (2–1) vs. Ottawa Gee-Gees; Lost CIS Pool B Game 2 (5–3) vs. Laurier Golden Hawks; Won CIS Bronze medal game (3–2) vs. Manitoba Bisons
2009-10	24	21	2	–	1	43	1st	Won AUS Pool A Game 1 (6–2) vs. UPEI Panthers; Won AUS Pool A Game 2 (3–1) vs. St. Thomas Tommies; Lost AUS Championship (4–0) vs. Saint Mary's Huskies
2010-11	24	17	5	–	2	36	2nd	Won AUS Pool B Game 1 (2–1) vs. Saint Mary's Huskies; Won AUS Pool B Game 2 (3–2) vs. St. Thomas Tommies; Lost AUS Championship (9–2) vs. St. Francis Xavier X-Women
2011-12	24	16	5	–	3	35	2nd	Won AUS Pool B Game 1 (5–0) vs. St. Thomas Tommies; Lost AUS Pool B Game 2 (5–4) vs. Mount Allison Mounties
2012-13	24	11	9	–	4	26	5th	Lost AUS Pool B Game 1 (3–2) vs. St. Thomas Tommies; Lost AUS Pool B Game 2 (4–1) vs. Saint Mary's Huskies
2013-14	24	14	9	–	1	29	3rd	Won AUS Quarter-Finals (2–0 series) vs. UPEI Panthers; Won AUS Semi-Finals (2–1 series) vs. Saint Mary's Huskies; Won AUS Championship (2–1 series) vs. Mount Allison Mounties; Lost CIS Pool B Game 1 (6–0) vs. Laurier Golden Hawks; Lost CIS Pool B Game 2 (8–2) vs. McGill Martlets; Won CIS 5th Place game (2–1) vs. St. Thomas Tommies
2014-15	24	17	3	–	4	38	2nd	Won AUS Semi-Finals (2–0 series) vs. Saint Mary's Huskies; Lost AUS Championship (2–1 series) vs. St. Francis Xavier X-Women; Lost CIS Quarter-Finals (3–1) vs. Western Mustangs; Won CIS Consolation Semi-Finals (4–1) vs. Alberta Pandas; Lost CIS 5th Place game (4–1) vs. Guelph Gryphons
2015-16	24	16	6	–	2	34	2nd	Lost AUS Semi-Finals (2–0 series) vs. St. Thomas Tommies
2016-17	24	8	12	–	4	20	5th	Won AUS Quarter-Finals (2–0 series) vs. UPEI Panthers; Lost AUS Semi-Finals (2–1 series) vs. Saint Mary's Huskies
2017-18	24	10	10	–	4	24	5th	Won AUS Quarter-Finals (2–1 series) vs. Dalhousie Tigers; Lost AUS Semi-Finals (2–0 series) vs. St. Francis Xavier X-Women
2018-19	28	13	14	–	1	27	6th	Lost AUS Quarter-Finals (2–1 series) vs. Saint Mary's Huskies
2019-20	28	8	18	–	2	18	6th	Lost AUS Quarter-Finals (2–1 series) vs. UPEI Panthers
2020-21	Cancelled due to the COVID-19 pandemic							
2021-22	22	10	10	–	2	22	6th	Lost AUS Quarter-Finals (6–1) vs. St. Francis Xavier X-Women

== Awards and honours ==
=== University Awards ===
- Marie-Pier Arsenault, 2012 Université de Moncton Female Rookie of the Year
- Geneviève David, 2012 Université de Moncton Female Athlete of the Year
- Marieve Provost, 2010-11 Université de Moncton Female Athlete of the Year

=== AUS Awards ===
- 2006-07: Rhéal Bordage - AUS Coach of the Year
- 2008-09: Denis Ross - AUS Coach of the Year
- 2009-10: Denis Ross - AUS Coach of the Year
- 2013-14: Denis Ross - AUS Coach of the Year

==== Rookie of the Year ====
- 1999-00: Guylaine Haché
- 2006-07: Marieve Provost
- 2011-12: Marie-Pier Arsenault
- 2014-15: Katryne Villeneuve

==== AUS Most Valuable Player ====
- 2006-07: Marieve Provost
- 2008-09: Kathy Desjardins
- 2009-10: Marieve Provost
- 2010-11: Marieve Provost
- 2018-19: Katryne Villeneuve

==== AUS All-Stars ====
- Kathy Desjardins, 2009-10 AUS First Team All-Star
- Mariève Provost, 2009-10 AUS First Team All-Star
- Valérie Boisclair, 2009-10 AUS Second Team All-Star
- Katryne Villeneuve, 2018-19 AUS First Team All-Stars

=== U Sports ===
- Mariève Provost, 2009 CIS Playoff All-Star team
- Marieve Provost, 2010-11 CIS Scoring Champion

==== U Sports All-Stars ====
- Mariève Provost, 2007-08 CIS First Team All-Star
- Mariève Provost, 2009-10 CIS First Team All-Star
- Mariève Provost, 2010-11 CIS First Team All-Star
- Émilie Bouchard, 2015-16 U Sports Second Team All-Canadian

==== U Sports All-Rookie ====
- Marie-Pier Arsenault, 2011-12 CIS All-Rookie Team
- Rhéal Bordage, 2006-07 CIS Coach of the Year
- Kathy Desjardins, 2008-09 CIS All-Rookie Team
- Mariève Provost, 2007-08 CIS All-Rookie team

== International ==
Player	Position	Nation	Event	Result
Marieve Provost	Forward	Canada	2009 Winter Universiade; 2011 Winter Universiade	1st place, gold medalist(s)
Cassandra Labrie	Defense	Canada	2019 Winter Universiade	2nd place, silver medalist(s)
Katryne Villeneuve	Forward	Canada	2019 Winter Universiade	2nd place, silver medalist(s)
Erica Plourde	Forward	Canada	Ice hockey at the 2025 Winter World University Games	2nd place, silver medalist(s)

== Aigles Blues in Pro Hockey ==
Player	Team	League	Seasons	Titles
Marieve Provost	Montreal Stars	CWHL	2012-15	None
Kathy Desjardins	Calgary Inferno	CWHL	2012-16	2016 Clarkson Cup

== See also ==
- Moncton Aigles Bleus men's ice hockey
