= 2018 U Sports Women's Ice Hockey Championship =

Canadian university ice hockey championship

- Season: 2017-18
- Teams: Eight
- Finals site: Thompson Arena; London, Ontario
- Champions: Manitoba Bisons (1st title)
- Runner-up: Western Mustangs
- Semifinalists: Manitoba, 2, Concordia, 1; Western, 2, Saskatchewan, 1
- Winning coach: Jon Rempel (1st title)
- MVP: Lauryn Keen (Manitoba)

The 2018 U Sports Women's Ice Hockey Championship was held from March 15–18, 2018, in London, Ontario to determine a national champion for the 2017–18 U Sports women's ice hockey season. The entire tournament was played at Thompson Arena on the campus of the University of Western Ontario. The Manitoba Bisons defeated the Western Mustangs 2–0 in the gold medal game to win the first championship in program history.

== Participating teams ==
Seed	Team	Qualified	Record
1	Manitoba Bisons	Canada West Champion	
2	Saint Mary's Huskies	AUS Champion	
3	Western Mustangs (Host)	OUA Champion	
4	Concordia Stingers	RSEQ Champion	
5	St. Francis Xavier X-Women	AUS Finalist	19-2-0
6	Montreal Carabins	RSEQ Finalist	
7	Saskatchewan Huskies	Canada West Finalist	
8	Queen's Golden Gaels	OUA Finalist	

== Championship bracket ==
First Round: March 15/16
1	Manitoba	4
8	Queens	0
4	Concordia	8
5	St. FX	1
7	Saskatchewan	3
2	St. Mary's	2
3	Western	4
6	Montreal	0

Semi-Finals: March 17
1	Manitoba	2
4	Concordia	1
3	Western	2
7	Saskatchewan	1

Gold Medal Game: March 18
1	Manitoba	2
3	Western	0
Bronze Medal Game: March 18
4	Concordia	4
7	Saskatchewan	2

== Consolation bracket ==
Semi-Finals: March 17
6	Montreal	2
2	Saint Mary's	1
5	St. FX	4
8	Queen's	3 (OT)

Fifth Place Game: March 18
6	Montreal	7
5	StFX	1

== Awards and honours ==
- Tournament MVP: Lauryn Keen (Manitoba)

=== Players of the game ===
Game	Player	School
March 15, 2018: Western vs. Montreal	Carmen Lasis; Jessica Cormier	Western; Montreal
March 17, 2018: Western vs. Saskatchewan	April Clark; Kaitlin Willoughby	Western; Saskatchewan
March 18, 2018: Montreal vs. St. FX	Lydia Schurman; Kim Poirier	St. FX; Montreal
March 18, 2018: Manitoba vs Western	Venla Hovi; Shailyn Waites	Manitoba; Western

=== All-Tournament Team ===
Player	Position	School
Alanna Sharman	Forward	Manitoba
Lauryn Keen	Forward	Manitoba
Kaitlin Willoughby	Forward	Saskatchewan
Caitlin Fyten	Defence	Manitoba
Marie Joelle Allard	Defence	Concordia
Carmen Lasis	Goaltender	Western

== See also ==
- 2018 U Sports University Cup
