= St. Francis Xavier X-Women ice hockey =

University ice hockey program in Nova Scotia, Canada

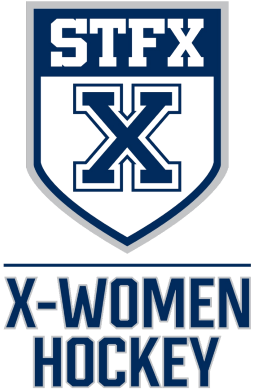
- University: St. Francis Xavier University
- Conference: AUS
- Head coach: Ben Berthiuame → since 2014–15 season
- Arena: Charles V. Keating Centre; Antigonish, Nova Scotia
- Colors: Blue and White

U Sports tournament appearances
- 1999, 2000, 2001, 2002, 2005, 2006, 2008, 2009, 2010, 2011, 2013, 2015, 2017, 2018, 2020, 2023, 2024, 2025

Conference tournament champions
- 1999, 2000, 2001, 2002, 2005, 2006, 2008, 2011, 2013, 2015, 2020, 2025

The St. Francis Xavier X-Women ice hockey team plays for St. Francis Xavier University, located in Antigonish, Nova Scotia. The team competes in the Atlantic University Sport (AUS) conference of U Sports where they were an inaugural varsity member of U Sports women's ice hockey in the 1997–98 season. Representing St. Francis Xavier Athletics, the X-Women have won the most AUS championships with 12 conference championship wins, most recently in 2025.

== History ==
=== 2010–11 season ===
During the 2010–11 season, the X-Women remained undefeated through the AUS regular schedule (24-0) and playoffs (3-0). The team won their first conference title since 2007–08. On March 14, 2011, the X-Women played in the national championship game for the first time. However, the squad was bested by the McGill Martlets in a 5–2 defeat. The silver medal finish is the program's highest in the U Sports women's ice hockey championship tournament.

=== Recent results ===
Prior to the 2013–14 season, AUS teams played a round robin tournament with six teams split into two groups (two games played each). The winners of those games played for the AUS championship. Starting in 2013–14, the AUS had teams play three-game series with seeding with the AUS championship also being awarded after a three-game series. Canadian Interuniversity Sport changed its name to U Sports in 2016. With the addition of the UNB Reds for the 2018–19 season, all AUS teams went from playing 24 regular season games to playing 28 games.

The 2019–20 team won the AUS championship after finishing the regular season on a 12-game winning streak and finished 4–0 in the AUS playoffs. In the 2020 national championship, the X-Women were seeded third and defeated the Montreal Carabins in the quarterfinal. However, due to the COVID-19 pandemic in Canada, the remainder of the tournament was cancelled, bringing a halt to a promising finish for the team.

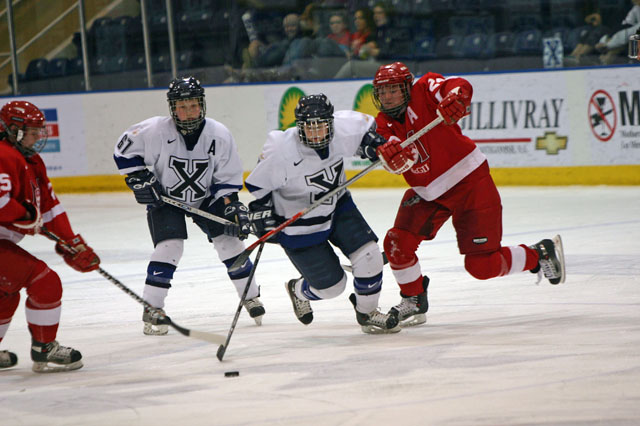
The X-Women in a game against the McGill Martlets in 2004.

Year	GP	W	L	OTL	PTS	Standing	Playoffs
2010–11	24	24	0	0	48	1st	Won AUS Championship (9–2) vs. Moncton; Lost CIS Championship (5–2) vs. McGill Martlets (2nd place finish)
2011–12	24	20	4	0	40	1st	Finished with 0–2 record in AUS round robin
2012–13	24	23	1	0	46	1st	Won AUS Championship (4–1) vs. Saint Mary's; Won CIS Bronze Medal Game (3–2 OT) vs. Toronto (3rd place finish)
2013–14	24	18	4	2	40	1st	Lost AUS Semi-final vs. Mount Allison (1–2 series)
2014–15	24	20	4	0	40	1st	Won AUS Championship vs. Moncton (2–0 series); Lost CIS Bronze Medal Game (2–1) vs. Montreal (4th place finish)
2015–16	24	9	13	2	21	5th	Lost AUS Semi-final vs. Saint Mary's (1–2 series)
2016–17	24	16	8	0	32	3rd	Lost AUS Championship vs. Saint Mary's (1–2 series)
2017–18	24	20	2	2	42	1st	Lost AUS Championship vs. Saint Mary's (1–2 series); Lost U Sports Consolation Final (7–1) vs. Montreal (6th place finish)
2018–19	28	18	9	1	39	2nd	Lost AUS Championship vs. St. Thomas (1–2 series)
2019–20	28	22	5	1	45	2nd	Won AUS Championship vs. Saint Mary's (2–0 series); U Sports championship cancelled due to COVID-19 pandemic
2020–21	Cancelled due to the COVID-19 pandemic						
2021–22	21	15	6	0	30	3rd	Lost AUS Championship vs. UNB Reds (0–2 series)
2022–23	28	20	5	3	43	2nd	Lost AUS Championship vs. UNB Reds (1–2 series); Lost U Sports Consolation Final (4–0) vs. Toronto (6th place finish)
2023–24	28	21	5	2	44	1st	Lost AUS Championship vs. UNB Reds (0–2 series); Lost U Sports Consolation Semi-Final (3–1) vs. Saskatchewan (8th place finish)
2024–25	28	18	5	5	41	2nd	Won AUS Championship vs. UNB Reds (2–0 series); U Sports championship TBD

=== All-time scoring leaders ===
Player	Seasons	GP	G	A	Pts
Alexa Normore	2010–11 to 2014–15	114	78	127	205
Brayden Ferguson	2004–05 to 2008–09	100	105	91	196
Christina Davis	2004–05 to 2008–09	104	86	93	179
Candice Ernst	2002–03 to 2006–07	85	57	113	170
Rebecca Davies	2003–04 to 2006–07	71	80	56	136
Daley Oddy	2013–14 to 2017–18	113	63	70	133
Sarah Bujold	2014–15 to 2018–19	121	62	51	113
Tracy Sullivan	2002–03 to 2004–05	46	44	65	109
Jessica Shanahan	2006–07 to 2009–10	87	48	53	101
Amanda Church	2004–05 to 2007–08	78	45	55	100

== Awards and honours ==
Note: F = forward; D = defenceman; G = goaltender

=== U Sports ===
U Sports was known as the Canadian Interuniversity Athletics Union (CIAU; French: Union sportive interuniversitaire canadienne – USIC) until 2001 and as Canadian Interuniversity Sport (CIS; French: Sport interuniversitaire canadien – SIC) from 2001 until the adoption of the current name in 2016.

==== Brodrick Trophy ====
The Brodrick Trophy is awarded to the player of the year in U Sports women's ice hockey. From 2017 to 2020, St. FX produced three Brodrick Trophy winners. Sarah Bujold (2016–17) and Daley Oddy (2017–18) represented back-to-back wins, while Tyra Meropoulis earned the honour in 2020. The first player in program history to capture the Brodrick Trophy was Brayden Ferguson, reaching the pinnacle in 2007–08.

2007–08: Brayden Ferguson
2016–17: Sarah Bujold
2017–18: Daley Oddy
2019–20: Tyra Meropoulis

==== Rookie of the Year ====
The U Sports Rookie of the Year Award in women's hockey recognizes a "first-year player who has exhibited exemplary skill and leadership."

2010–11: Alex Normore
2021–22: Abby Lewis

==== All-Canadians ====
All-Canadian honours are awarded by U Sports to the most outstanding regular season players in women's ice hockey.

First Team

1998–99: Leanne MacDonald (D)
2000–01: Leanne MacDonald (D)
2007–08: Brayden Ferguson (F)
2010–11: Suzanne Fenerty (D)
2011–12: Suzanne Fenerty (D), Alex Normore (F)
2013–14: Alex Normore (F)
2016–17: Sarah Bujold (F)
2018–19: Lindsey Donovan (D)
2019–20: Lindsey Donovan (D), Tyra Meropoulis (F)

Second Team

2005–06: Rebecca Davies (F)
2006–07: Marilynn Hay (D)
2007–08: Marilynn Hay (D)
2010–11: Alex Normore (F)
2012–13: Alex Normore (F)
2013–14: Jenna Pitts (D)
2014–15: Alex Normore (F)

==== All-Rookies ====
U Sports All-Rookie Teams have recognized outstanding first-year players of the regular season since 2003–04.

2003–04: Katie Barrett (D), Rebecca Davies (F)
2005–06: Laura Grant (D)
2009–10: Abygail Laking (F)
2010–11: Alex Normore (F), Jenna Pitts (D)
2017–18: Emerson Elliott (F)
2018–19: Tyra Meropoulis (F)
2019–20: Jamie Johnson (G)
2021–22: Amaya Giraudier (G), Abby Lewis (F)

==== Fair Play Award ====
A CIS Championship Fair Play Award was awarded until the 2009–10 season. From 2010 to 2013, the player who "best exhibit[ed] the standards of fair play" throughout the CIS Championship tournament was recognized with the R.W. Pugh Fair Play Award. No fair play awards have been awarded since 2013.

2006: Kelly Boudreau
2008: Suzanne Fenerty
2009: Suzanne Fenerty
2010: Katie Harvieux

==== Championship All-Stars ====
U Sports Championship All-Stars are awarded to the best players at the national tournament in women's ice hockey.

2000: Leanne MacDonald
2002: Amy Handrahan (G)
2006: Katie Harvieux (G)
2011: Carolyn Campbell (F), Suzanne Fenerty (D)
2013: Jenna Downey (D)
2015: Alex Normore (F)

=== AUS ===
- Female Athlete of the Year, Finalist: Tyra Meropoulis, 2019–20

==== Most Valuable Player ====
The recipient of the Most Valuable Player award becomes the AUS nominee for the U Sports Brodrick Trophy.

1998–99: Leanne MacDonald
2007–08: Brayden Ferguson
2011–12: Alex Normore
2012–13: Alex Normore
2013–14: Alex Normore
2014–15: Alex Normore
2016–17: Sarah Bujold
2017–18: Daley Oddy
2019–20: Tyra Meropoulis

==== Rookie of the Year ====
The recipient of the AUS Rookie of the Year Award represents the conference as a finalist for the U Sports Rookie of the Year Award.

2003–04: Rebecca Davies
2009–10: Abygail Laking
2010–11: Alex Normore
2017–18: Emerson Elliott
2021–22: Abby Lewis
2023–24: Ireland McCloskey

==== Coach of the Year ====
The recipient of the AUS Coach of the Year Award represents the conference as a finalist for the U Sports Coach of the Year Award.

1999-2000: Frank Isherwood
2000–01: Frank Isherwood
2003–04: David Synishin
2004–05: David Synishin
2007–08: David Synishin
2012–13: David Synishin
2014–15: Ben Berthiaume
2017–18: Ben Berthiaume
2022–23: Ben Berthiaume

==== Most Sportsmanlike Player ====
AUS Most Sportsmanlike Player "recognizes an individual who maintains the standards of fair play and treats those around her with respect at all times."

2003–04: Jill Bowie
2004–05: Sheila Kelly
2009–10: Suzanne Fenerty
2014–15: Taylor Dale
2015–16: Taylor Dale
2023–24: Ireland McCloskey

==== Top Defensive Player ====
Awarded since the 2016–17 season, the AUS Top Defensive Player has been recognizes a skater who consistently excels in defensive aspects of the game and displays strong play in all areas of the ice individually and as part of their team's defensive tactics.

2019–20: Lydia Schurman

==== Student-Athlete Community Service Award ====
The recipient of the AUS Student-Athlete Community Service Award represents the conference as a finalist for the U Sports Marion Hilliard Award.

2004–05: Colleen Wall

==== All-Stars ====
One AUS All-Star team per season was named through the 2000–01. The AUS All-Star second team was introduced in the 2001–02 season.

1998–99: Leanne MacDonald (D)
1999-2000: Cindy Clarke (F), Amy Handrahan (G), Leanne MacDonald (D)
2000–01: Michelle Fortier (F), Amy Handrahan (G), Leanne MacDonald (D)

First Team

2001–02: Michelle Fortier (F), Gayle MacDonald (D)
2002–03: Tracy Sullivan (F)
2003–04: Katie Barrett (D), Rebecca Davies (F), Amy Handrahan (G), Tracy Sullivan (F)
2004–05: Candace Ernst (F), Sheila Kelly (D)
2005–06: Rebecca Davies (F), Laura Grant (D)
2006–07: Marilynn Hay (D), Sheila Kelly (D)
2007–08: Brayden Ferguson (F), Marilynn Hay (D)
2008–09: Christina Davis (F), Brayden Ferguson (F), Laura Grant (D), Marilynn Hay (D)
2009–10: Suzanne Fenerty (D), Marilynn Hay (D)
2010–11: Suzanne Fenerty (D), Alex Normore (F), Janelle Parent (F)
2011–12: Suzanne Fenerty (D), Alex Normore (F), Janelle Parent (F)
2012–13: Jenna Downey (D), Alex Normore (F)
2013–14: Alex Normore (F), Jenna Pitts (D)
2014–15: Jenna Downey (D), Alex Normore (F), Sojung Shin (G)
2016–17: Sarah Bujold (F)
2017–18: Sarah Bujold (F), Lindsey Donovan (D), Daley Oddy (F)
2018–19: Sarah Bujold (F), Lindsey Donovan (D)
2019–20: Lindsey Donovan (D), Tyra Meropoulis (F)
2021–22: Maggy Burbidge (F), Lauren Dabrowski (D)
2022–23: Maggy Burbidge (F), Lauren Dabrowski (D), Lea MacLeod (F)

Second Team

2001–02: Amy Handrahan (G)
2002–03: Cindy Connors (F), Leanne MacDonald (D)
2004–05: Brayden Ferguson (F), Tracy Sullivan (F)
2005–06: Candace Ernst (F), Brayden Ferguson (F)
2006–07: Kelly Boudreau (F), Christina Davis (F), Brayden Ferguson (F)
2007–08: Suzanne Fenerty (D), Jessica Shanahan (F)
2009–10: Carolyn Campbell (F), Jessica Shanahan (F)
2010–11: Marilynn Hay (D)
2011–12: Jenna Pitts (D)
2012–13: Taylor Dale (F), Kristy Garrow (G), Jenna Pitts (D)
2013–14: Daley Oddy (F)
2014–15: Daley Oddy (F)
2015–16: Daley Oddy (F)
2016–17: Daley Oddy (F)
2017–18: Carley Molnar (G)
2018–19: Tyra Meropoulis (F)
2021–22: Lea MacLeod (F), Tyra Meropoulis (F)
2022–23: Josie Chisholm (D)
2023–24: Maggy Burbidge (F)

==== All-Rookies ====
2006–07: Marilynn Hay (D), Jessica Shanahan (F)
2007–08: Suzanne Fenerty (D), Catie Gavin (F)
2008–09: Erin Brophy (F)
2009–10: Jenna Downey (D), Abygail Laking (F)
2010–11: Kristy Garrow (G), Alex Normore (F), Jenna Pitts (D)
2012–13: Schyler Campbell (F), Taylor Dale (F)
2013–14: Nicole Corcoran (F), Daley Oddy (F)
2014–15: Nicole Halladay (D)
2016–17: Lindsey Donovan (D)
2017–18: Emerson Elliott (F), Amy Graham (D)
2018–19: Tyra Meropoulis (F)
2019–20: Jamie Johnson (G)
2021–22: Amaya Giraudier (G), Abby Lewis (F), Ella VandeSompel (D)
2022–23: Kya Moss (D)
2023–24: Mackenzie Lothian (D), Ireland McCloskey (F)

=== St. Francis Xavier University awards ===
==== Student-Athlete of the Year ====
2008: Brayden Ferguson (Note: Co-winner with rugby player Ghislaine Landry)
2011: Suzanne Fenerty
2014: Alex Normore
2017: Sarah Bujold
2018: Daley Oddy
2020: Tyra Meropoulis
2023: Maggie Burbidge

==== Sports Hall of Fame ====
The StFX Sports Hall of Fame honours student-athletes, builders, and teams who made outstanding contributions through sport at St. Francis Xavier University.

Inductee	Category	Year inducted
Leanne MacDonald	Athlete	2017
Beth McCharles (Note: Inducted for contributions to both soccer and hockey at StFX.)	Athlete	2019

== X-Women in professional hockey ==
- Suzanne Fenerty was selected by the Brampton Thunder in the fifth round of the 2012 CWHL Draft, but never appeared with the team.

= CWHL All-Star	= NWHL All-Star	= Clarkson Cup Champion	= Isobel Cup Champion

Player	Position	Team(s)	League(s)	Years	Titles
Lindsey Donovan	Forward	AIK	SDHL		
Brayden Ferguson	Forward	Burlington Barracudas	CWHL	2	
Rebecca Davies	Forward	Mississauga Chiefs; Toronto Furies	CWHL	4	2014 Clarkson CupAs Furies GM

=== International ===
- Brayden Ferguson Canada: 2009 Winter Universiade (gold)
- Jenna Downey, Defense Canada: 2011 Winter Universiade (gold)
- Suzanne Fenerty, Defense Canada: 2011 Winter Universiade (gold)
- Alex Normore – StFX Canada: 2015 Winter Universiade (silver)
- Daley Oddy, Canada: 2015 Winter Universiade (silver)
- Daley Oddy, Forward Canada: 2017 Winter Universiade (silver)

== See also ==
- St. Francis Xavier X-Men ice hockey
