= 2009–10 St. Francis Xavier X-Women women's ice hockey season =

- Conference: [[Atlantic University Sport|AUS]]
- Home ice: Charles V. Keating Centre

Rankings
- CIS: 5

Record
- Overall: 18-6-0
- Home: 11-1-0
- Road: 7-5-0

Coaches and captains
- Head coach: David Synishin
- Assistant coaches: Ben Berthiaume; Willie Jo Sofan; Don Davis

The 2009–10 St. Francis Xavier X-Women women's ice hockey team represented St. Francis Xavier University. Their overall record of 18-6-0 (four losses were overtime losses) ranked second overall in the AUS. The X-Women qualified for the CIS National Championship tournament.

== Exhibition ==
Date	Score
Sat., Sept. 26	StFX 2 @ Dalhousie 3
Sun., Sept. 27	Dalhousie 1 @ StFX 4
Sun., Sept. 28	StFX 5 @ Saint Mary's 0
Fri., Oct. 2	StFX 3 @ Edouard Monpetit 4
Sat., Oct. 3	StFX 4 @ Mount A 0
Sun., Oct. 4	StFX 1 @ St. Thomas 3
Fri., Nov. 20	McGill 4 @ StFX 0
Sat., Nov. 21	Concordia 3 @ StFX 4

== Season standings ==
2009–10 Atlantic University Sport standings
	Conference						
	GP	W	L	OTL	GF	GA	PTS
Moncton	24	21	2	1	95	45	43
StFX	24	18	2	4	85	36	40
Saint Mary's	24	13	10	1	80	80	27
St. Thomas	24	12	10	2	51	57	26
Dalhousie	24	11	13	0	66	64	22
UPEI	24	7	16	1	45	88	15
Mount Allison	24	2	21	1	37	89	5

== Postseason ==
=== AUS playoffs ===
Date	Score	Notes
Thu., Feb. 25	StFX 6 vs Dalhousie 0	win (round robin #1)
Sat., Feb. 27	Saint Mary's 5 vs StFX 3	loss (round robin #2)

Heading into the CIS tournament, the X-Women were 3-21 in eight previous tournament appearances. The X-Women played for a medal once, in 2006, when they lost 3-2 to the McGill Martlets in the third-place game.

== Player stats ==
Fenerty finished second in scoring among all defenders in the AUS with 16 points. Her 16 points (accomplished in 24 games) were a career high for Fenerty. Hay accumulated 14 points (5 goals and 9 assists).

=== Skaters ===
#	Name	GP	G	A	Pts	Shots	Pct	+/-
18	Jessica Shanahan	24	13	15	28	77	.169	+18
89	Abygail Laking	24	15	10	25	83	.181	+18
6	Carolyn Campbell	23	13	9	22	100	.130	+8
92	Catie Gavin	18	5	16	21	55	.091	+9
13	Suzanne Fenerty	24	2	14	16	50	.040	+5
19	Brittney Perkins	24	9	5	14	59	.153	+13
41	Marilynn Hay	22	5	9	14	104	.048	+18
21	Daniela Falconio	24	5	8	13	40	.125	+6
10	Laura Grant	24	2	11	13	54	.037	+16
94	Nicole Hansom	24	5	7	12	54	.093	+8
72	Jenna Downey	24	2	10	12	57	.035	+6
17	Sidney Ritchie	23	4	4	8	37	.108	+5
23	Tyson Beukeboom	15	1	5	6	17	.059	0
3	Leah Boucher	23	2	2	4	22	.091	+10
7	Jessica McCullough	18	0	3	3	12	.000	+7
12	Anna Barrett	8	1	1	2	16	.062	+1

=== Goaltenders ===
Name	GP	Min	GA	Avg	Svs	Pct	W	L	T	Sho	PP	SH	EN	PEN	SOG
Jenna Laidlaw	1	0:10	0	0.00	0	.000	0	0	0	0	0	0	0	0	0
Katie Harvieux	15	912:27	20	1.32	325	.942	12	3	0	2	8	0	0	0	0
Katie Greenway	9	548:50	15	1.64	152	.910	6	3	0	0	5	0	0	0	0

== Awards and honors ==
- Suzanne Fenerty, 2010 AUS First Team All-Star
- Marilyn Hay, 2010 AUS First Team All-Star (Hay was a first team selection for the fourth consecutive season.)

== See also ==
- Canadian Interuniversity Sport
