= Sarah Bujold =

Canadian ice hockey player

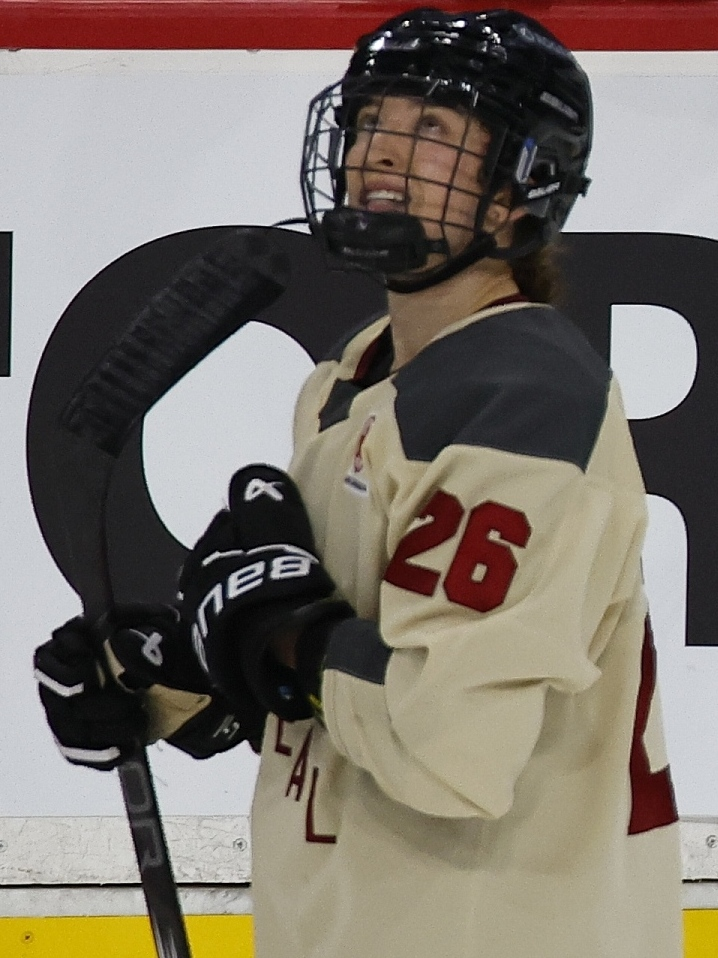
- Bujold with PWHL Montreal in 2024
- Born: 26 February 1996 (age 30) Riverview, New Brunswick, Canada
- Height: 5 ft 6 in (168 cm)
- Weight: 143 lb (65 kg; 10 st 3 lb)
- Position: Forward
- Shoots: Left
- SDHL team Former teams: Luleå HF/MSSK: PWHL Montreal; Metropolitan Riveters; HV71 Jönköping; Djurgårdens IF Hockey; St. Francis Xavier X-Women
- Playing career: 2014–present

Sarah Bujold (born 26 February 1996) is a Canadian ice hockey forward for Luleå HF/MSSK of the Swedish Women's Hockey League (SDHL). She has previously played for HV71 Jönköping and Djurgårdens IF Hockey of the SDHL, the Metropolitan Riveters of the Premier Hockey Federation (PHF), and Montreal Victoire of the Professional Women's Hockey League (PWHL).

== Playing career ==
Bujold played five seasons of college ice hockey with the St. Francis Xavier X-Women ice hockey program in the Atlantic University Sport (AUS) of U Sports during 2014 to 2019. She was selected as a first team U Sports All-Star in both the 2016–17 and 2017–18 seasons, and received the 2017 Brodrick Trophy as U Sports women's ice hockey Player of the Year. Across her five-year college ice hockey career, she averaged 0.93 points per game and, as of 2022, she ranks among the top-ten in X-Women history for career points, career goals, single-season points, and single-season goals.

Following her college career, she planned to play for Les Canadiennes de Montréal in the Canadian Women's Hockey League (CWHL) but the league folded in May 2019 and she was forced to explore other options.

Bujold ultimately signed in the Swedish Women's Hockey League (SDHL) with Djurgårdens IF Hockey for the 2019–20 SDHL season. In her debut SDHL season, she tied Jenn Wakefield and Andrea Dalen for most goals scored by a Djurgårdens player and ranked second in scoring on the team, trailing Wakefield by just three points. She remained a key piece of Djurgården's offense after re-signing for the 2020–21 SDHL season, ranking second behind Josephine Jacobsen in both goals and points scored for the team and 24th in points of all SDHL players.

Ahead of the 2021–22 SDHL season, Bujold left Djurgården to sign with HV71 in Jönköping, Sweden. The new environment boosted her to the best offensive production of her SDHL career and she led team in scoring, with twenty goals and fourteen assists for 34 points in 29 games, and ranked twelfth in the league for points.

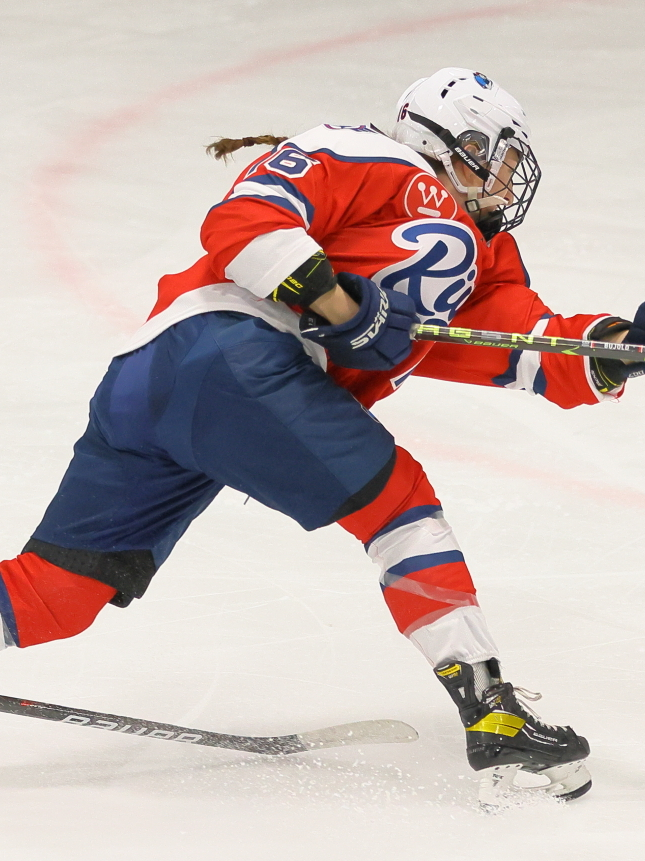
Bujold with the Metropolitan Riveters in 2022

Bujold signed with Metropolitan Riveters for the 2022–23 PHF season, making her return to North America after three successful seasons in Sweden. She made an immediate impact, receiving PHF first star of the week honors in the opening week of the season, and by season's end, she ranked third in team scoring, behind veteran PHFers Madison Packer and Kelly Babstock. She re-signed with the Riveters for the 2023–24 PHF season, but the contract was voided when the league was bought out and dissolved in June 2023.

Undeterred by the second league collapse of her short career, Bujold declared for the 2023 draft of the newly established Professional Women's Hockey League (PWHL). She went undrafted and later explained, "My agent and I definitely thought I would be drafted, even if only in the later rounds... it was disappointing." Despite missing out on a draft slot, several teams extended training camp invitations to her and she opted to attend the training camp of PWHL Montréal (renamed Victoire de Montréal/Montreal Victoire in 2024). Bujold became the first player from New Brunswick to sign with a PWHL team when she signed a one-year contract with PWHL Montréal as a free agent on November 15, 2023, before the league’s inaugural training camp began. She was one of two players from New Brunswick to make final rosters for the start of the inaugural PWHL season (the other was goaltender Marlène Boissonnault, who also signed with Montréal).

On December 2, 2024, Bujold returned to the SDHL, signing a one-year contract with Luleå HF/MSSK.

After spending the 2024–25 and 2025–26 seasons with Luleå HF/MSSK of the Swedish Women’s Hockey League (SDHL), Bujold returned to the Professional Women’s Hockey League, signing a reserve player contract with the New York Sirens March 31, 2026. During her time in Sweden, Bujold established herself as an offensive contributor, recording nine goals and nine assists in 14 games during the 2024–25 season, followed by 10 goals and 11 assists in 33 games during the 2025–26 campaign.

== Personal life ==
Bujold has a younger sister, Sophie, who plays ice hockey with the UPEI Panthers women's ice hockey program.

She was in relationship with HV71 and Metropolitan Riveters teammate Ebba Berglund for several years during the early 2020s.

== Career statistics ==
=== Regular season and playoffs ===
			Regular season					Playoffs
Season	Team	League	GP	G	A	Pts	PIM	GP	G	A	Pts	PIM
2014-15	StFX X-Women	AUS	24	6	1	7	22	–	–	–	–	–
2015-16	StFX X-Women	AUS	24	6	6	12	22	–	–	–	–	–
2016-17	StFX X-Women	AUS	24	24	19	43	18	–	–	–	–	–
2017-18	StFX X-Women	AUS	23	13	14	27	35	5	3	2	5	0
2018-19	StFX X-Women	AUS	26	13	11	24	8	5	3	4	7	6
2019–20	Djurgårdens IF	SDHL	34	13	12	25	16	5	2	1	3	2
2020–21	Djurgårdens IF	SDHL	34	14	12	26	26	6	2	1	3	8
2021–22	HV71	SDHL	29	20	14	34	30	6	0	1	1	8
2022–23	Metropolitan Riveters	PHF	23	10	10	20	28	–	–	–	–	–
2023–24	PWHL Montreal	PWHL	21	3	1	4	18	–	–	–	–	–
U Sports totals			121	62	51	113	105	10	6	6	12	6
SDHL totals			97	47	38	85	72	17	4	3	7	18
