= 2015 CIS Women's Ice Hockey Championship =

- Season: 2014-15
- Teams: Eight
- Finals site: Markin MacPhail Centre; Calgary, Alberta
- Champions: Western Mustangs (1st title)
- Runner-up: McGill Martlets
- Winning coach: Chris Higgins (1st title)
- MVP: Kelly Campbell (Western Mustangs)

The 2015 CIS Women's Ice Hockey Championship was held from March 12–15, 2015, in Calgary, Alberta, to determine a national champion for the 2014–15 CIS women's ice hockey season. The entire tournament was played at the Markin MacPhail Centre near the campus of the University of Calgary. The Western Mustangs defeated the McGill Martlets in a 5-0 shutout win to capture their first national championship. Anthea Lasis, Ally Galloway, Stacey Scott, Kendra Broad and Casey Rosen scored for the Mustangs. Goaltender Kelly Campbell recorded 38 saves in the win, gaining recognition as the Tournament MVP.

== Participating teams ==
Seed	Team	Qualified	Record
1	McGill Martlets	RSEQ champions	16–4–0
2	Western Mustangs	OUA champions	20–1–3
3	Alberta Pandas	Canada West champions	20–7–1
4	St. Francis Xavier X-Women	AUS champions	20–4–0
5	Guelph Gryphons	OUA finalists	18–3–3
6	Montreal Carabins	RSEQ finalists	15–4–1
7	Moncton Aigles Bleues	AUS finalists	17–5–2
8	Calgary Dinos	Canada West semi-finalists (Host)	14–9–5

== Championship Bracket ==
First Round: March 12/13
2	Western	3
7	Moncton	1
3	Alberta	3
6	Montreal	4
4	St. FX	4
5	Guelph	3
1	McGill	8
8	Calgary	2

Semi-Finals: March 14
2	Western	2
6	Montreal	0
1	McGill	1
4	St. FX	0

Gold Medal Game: March 15
2	Western	5
1	McGill	0
Bronze Medal Game: March 15
4	St. FX	1
6	Montreal	2

== Awards and honours ==
- Championship MVP: Kelly Campbell, Western

=== Player of the Game ===
Game	Players	Teams
March 15, 2015: Montreal vs. St FX	Josianne Legault; Daley Oddy	Montreal; St FX
March 15, 2015: Guelph vs. Moncton	Rachael Cassidy; Marika Lacroix	Guelph; Moncton

=== All-Tournament Team ===
- Goaltender: Kelly Campbell, Western
- Defenceman: Katelyn Gosling, Western
- Defenceman: Kelsie Moffatt, McGill
- Forward: Kendra Broad, Western
- Forward: Gabrielle Davidson, McGIll
- Forward: Alex Normore, St. FX
