= 2017 U Sports Women's Ice Hockey Championship =

Canadian university ice hockey championship

- Teams: Eight
- Finals site: Strathcona Paper Centre; Napanee, Ontario
- Champions: Alberta Pandas (8th title)
- Runner-up: McGill Martlets
- Semifinalists: Alberta, 2, Concordia, 1; McGill, 1, UBC, 0
- Winning coach: Howie Draper (8th title)
- MVP: Lindsey Post (Alberta)

The 2017 U Sports Women's Ice Hockey Championship was held from March 16–19, 2017, in Napanee, Ontario, to determine a national champion for the 2016–17 U Sports women's ice hockey season. The entire tournament was played at Strathcona Paper Centre, near the campus of Queen's University.

== Participating teams ==
Seed	Team	Qualified	Record
1	UBC Thunderbirds	Canada West Champion	30-6-1
2	Guelph Gryphons	OUA Champion	
3	Saint Mary's Huskies	AUS Champion	
4	McGill Martlets	RSEQ Champion	
5	St. Francis Xavier X-Women	AUS Finalist	
6	Alberta Pandas	Canada West Finalist	
7	Concordia Stingers	RSEQ Finalist	
8	Queen's Golden Gaels	OUA Quarterfinals(Host)	15-12-0

== Championship Bracket ==
First Round: March 16/17
6	Alberta Pandas	2
3	Saint Mary’s	1
7	Concordia	4
2	Guelph	3
1	UBC	2
8	Queen’s	1
4	McGill	3
5	St. FX	1

Semi-Finals: March 18
6	Alberta	2
7	Concordia	1
McGill	1
1	UBC	0

Gold Medal Game: March 19
6	Alberta	2
4	McGill	1
Bronze Medal Game: March 19
1	UBC	2
7	Concordia	0

== Consolation Bracket ==
Semi-Finals: March 17
3	Saint Mary’s	4
2	Guelph	3
8	Queen’s	2
5	St. FX	0

Fifth Place Game: March 19
3	Saint Mary's	4
8	Queen's	1

== Awards and honors ==
- Tournament MVP: Lindsey Post, Alberta

=== Players of the Game ===
Game	Player	School
Alberta vs. Saint Mary's	Amy Boucher; Rebecca Clark	Alberta; Saint Mary's
March 16: UBC vs. Queen's	Nicole Saxvik; Stephanie Pascal	St. FX; Queen's
March 17, 2017: Guelph vs. Concordia	Valerie Lamenta; Claudia Dubois	Guelph; Concordia
March 17: St. FX vs. Queen's	Sarah Bujold; Amber Sealey	St. FX; Queen's
March 18: Guelph vs. Saint Mary's	Sophie Contant; Breanna Lanceleve	Guelph; Concordia
March 18: McGill vs. UBC	Gabrielle Davidson; Amelia Boughn	McGill; UBC
March 19: Saint Mary's vs. Queen's	Hannah Askin; Addi Halladay	Saint Mary's; Queen's
March 19, 2017: Concordia vs. UBC	Audrey Belzile; Kelly Murray	Concordia; UBC

=== All-Tournament Team ===
Player	Position	School
Mélodie Daoust	Forward	McGill
Gabrielle Davidson	Forward	McGill
Alex Poznikoff	Forward	Alberta
Kelly Murray	Defence	UBC
Emilia Cotter	Defence	McGill
Lindsey Post	Goaltender	Alberta
