= UNB Reds women's ice hockey =

Canadian university ice hockey team

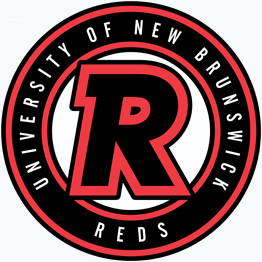
- University: University of New Brunswick
- Conference: AUS
- Governing Body: U Sports
- Head coach: Sarah Hilworth; Since 2018-19 season
- Assistant coaches: Taylor Maschmeyer, Cassidy Hilworth, Nick Boudreau, Corey Williamson,
- Captain(s): Payton Hargreaves
- Alternate captain(s): Lauren Carter, Jorja Nystrom
- Arena: Aitken University Centre; Fredericton, New Brunswick
- Colors: Red and Black

U Sports tournament appearances
- 2022, 2023, 2024, 2025

Conference tournament champions
- 2022, 2023, 2024

The UNB Reds women's ice hockey program represents the University of New Brunswick in the Atlantic University Sport conference of U Sports.

== History ==
=== Return to AUS hockey ===
Former UNB Reds skater had filed a human rights complaint following the decision to downgrade the women’s hockey team from varsity to club status following the 2007-08 season. In mid-March 2008, the UNB Reds athletic department announced that five sports would become competitive club status. In addition to women’s ice hockey, men’s swimming, cross country, along with men’s and women’s wrestling were casualties of this decision.

The program would return to varsity status for the 2018-19 Atlantic University Sport season. With an official introduction taking place on October 12, 2018, including a jersey ceremony held at Long Hall, in the Richard J. Currie Center, the captains for the new era of Reds hockey were also announced. Sydney DesRochers, a native of Woodstock, New Brunswick was named Team Captain, while Hayley Hallihan and Jennifer Bell, both from Miramichi, New Brunswick, were named assistant captains. Paige Grenier, from Olds, Alberta, became the first Red, extended an offer by head coach Sarah Hilworth, late in the summer of 2017. Ashley Stratton, from Mount Pearl, Newfoundland, became the first Atlantic Canadian recruited to the Reds, having won the Atlantic Challenge Cup in 2015.

=== Inaugural season ===
The Reds first game, which was also their Atlantic University Sport season opener took place versus the Mount Allison Mounties on October 13, 2018. The game was the Reds first women's ice hockey game since an 8-1 loss to Mount Allison in the AUS Quarterfinals on February 22, 2008. As a side note, it was also the Reds first home opener since October 27, 2007. Jennifer Bell scored unassisted, 21 seconds into the second period, on Mounties goaltender Kaitlin Mowbray, capitalizing on a power play for the first goal of the new era. The game would go into double overtime, with Mounties skater Maddy Koughan scoring the game-winning tally. Of note, Kendra Woodland would be recognized as the Second Star of the Game, recording 32 saves.

Woodland would emerge among the team's star players in the landmark season. Participating in 23 regular season games, she would capture a trio of honours, including the Atlantic University Sport Rookie of the Year, First Team All-Star honours, plus a spot on the AUS All-Rookie Team. Winning nine games, including three shutouts, she paced all goaltenders in conference play with a sparkling .945 save percentage, ranking eighth overall in U Sports play.

Statistically, Tamina Kehler would finish as the Reds leading scorer, amassing 16 points, on the strength of 10 assists. Jennifer Bell and Lillian George would tie for the team lead in goals scored with 7. Between the pipes, Kendra Woodland amassed 23 appearances, recording a Goals Against Average of 1.73 and a save percentage of .945.

Qualifying for the playoffs in the first season of their return, the Reds faced off against the UPEI Panthers program in the Subway Atlantic University Sport quarter-final series. Enjoying a 3-0 lead in Game One, the Reds would prevail in a 3-2 final, to win the first playoff game of the new era. Goals were scored by Lillian George, Ashley Stratton and Paige Grenier.

=== 2020s ===
Among the first key departures in the new era involved the resignation of Brittany Esposito from the coaching staff in April 2020. Having won the Clarkson Cup in 2016 with the Calgary Inferno, Esposito, a former CWHL All-Star, was part of Hilworth’s staff for the Reds first two seasons.

=== Season-by-season Record ===
Won championship	Lost championship	Conference champions	League leader

Year	Coach	W	L	OTL	GF	GA	Pts	Finish	Conference Tournament	Nationals
2025–26	Sarah Hilworth	20	6	2	73	43	42	2nd, AUS		
2024–25	Sarah Hilworth	21	5	2	76	46	44	1st, AUS	Lost, Finals vs. StFX X-Women	7th place, 2025 Nationals
2023–24	Sarah Hilworth	21	6	1	92	50	43	2nd, AUS	Won, Finals vs. StFX X-Women	7th place, 2024 Nationals
2022–23	Sarah Hilworth	23	2	3	81	34	49	1st, AUS	Won, Finals vs. StFX X-Women	7th place, 2023 Nationals
2021–22	Sarah Hilworth	15	3	3	65	33	33	1st, AUS	Won, Finals vs. StFX X-Women	4th place, 2022 Nationals
2020–21	Cancelled due to the COVID-19 pandemic									
2019–20	Sarah Hilworth	18	9	1	73	51	37	4th, AUS	Lost, Semi-finals vs. Saint Mary's Huskies	
2018–19	Sarah Hilworth	13	11	4	53	56	30	4th, AUS	Lost, Semi-finals vs. St. Thomas Tommies	

=== Team captains ===
- 2018-19: Sydney DesRochers (assistants: Hayley Hallihan and Jennifer Bell)
- 2019-20: Sydney DesRochers
- 2021-22: Paige Grenier (assistants: Jenna MacLean, Ashley Stratton, Frederike Cyr, Amanda Desrochers and Katherine Chadwick)
- 2022-23: Paige Grenier (assistants: Jenna MacLean, Ashley Stratton, Frederike Cyr and Lillian George)
- 2023-24: Payton Hargreaves (assistants: Lillian George, Lauren Carter, Reagan Minor and Kendra Woodland)
- 2024-25: Payton Hargreaves (assistants: Lauren Carter)
- 2025-26: Payton Hargreaves (assistants: Lauren Carter and Jorja Nystrom)

=== Season team scoring champion ===
Year	Player	GP	G	A	PTS	PIM	AUS rank
2025-26	Katelyn Scott	28	9	19	28	6	1st
2024–25	Katelyn Scott	26	13	17	30	6	1st
2023–24	Lillian George	28	18	18	36	4	1st (tied)
2022–23	Lillian George	27	10	15	25	8	10th (tied)
2021–22	Ashley Stratton	21	10	10	20	2	6th
2019–20	Ashley Stratton	28	13	17	30	2	3rd
2018–19	Jennifer Bell	19	7	7	14	9	16th (tied)

== Rivalries ==
St. Francis Xavier University X-Women

UNB victories	StFX victories	Tie games

No.	Date	Location	Winning team		Losing team	
1	October 19, 2018	Antigonish	StFX	6	UNB	0
2	November 16, 2018	Fredericton	UNB	2	StFX	1
3	January 4, 2019	Antigonish	StFX	2	UNB	0
4	January 27, 2019	Fredericton	StFX	2	UNB	1
5	October 19, 2019	Antigonish	UNB	2	StFX	1
6	November 9, 2019	Antigonish	UNB	2	StFX	0
7	January 11, 2020	Fredericton	StFX	5	UNB	2
8	February 1, 2020	Fredericton	StFX	4	UNB	2
9	October 16, 2021	Antigonish	UNB	3	StFX	2 (SO)
10	November 13, 2021	Antigonish	UNB	2	StFX	0
11	February 26, 2022	Fredericton	UNB	3	StFX	1
12	October 29, 2022	Fredericton	UNB	6	StFX	2
13	November 12, 2022	Antigonish	UNB	2	StFX	1
14	January 7, 2023	Fredericton	UNB	2	StFX	1 (SO)
15	January 29, 2023	Antigonish	StFX	3	UNB	1
16	October 27, 2023	Antigonish	UNB	3	StFX	2 (OT)
17	November 18, 2023	Antigonish	StFX	6	UNB	2
18	January 20, 2024	Fredericton	StFX	2	UNB	0
19	February 13, 2024	Fredericton	StFX	5	UNB	2
20	September 18, 2024	Fredericton	UNB	4	StFX	3 (SO)
21	October 8, 2024	Fredericton	StFX	2	UNB	1 (OT)
22	January 24, 2025	Antigonish	StFX	4	UNB	1
23	February 14, 2025	Antigonish	UNB	2	StFX	1 (SO)
24	October 31, 2025	Fredericton	UNB	2	StFX	1
25	November 14, 2025	Antigonish	StFX	5	UNB	1
26	January 17, 2026	Fredericton	StFX	2	UNB	1 (SO)
27	February 6, 2026	Antigonish	StFX	2	UNB	1
Series: StFX leads 14–13

St. Thomas Tommies

UNB victories	St. Thomas victories	Tie games

No.	Date	Location	Winning team		Losing team	
1	October 14, 2018	Fredericton	St. Thomas	2	UNB	1 (OT)
2	November 7, 2018	Fredericton	St. Thomas	2	UNB	1
3	November 28, 2018	Fredericton	St. Thomas	2	UNB	1
4	January 9, 2019	Fredericton	UNB	3	St. Thomas	1
5	October 5, 2019	Fredericton	UNB	3	St. Thomas	0
6	October 23, 2019	Fredericton	St. Thomas	2	UNB	1
7	November 27, 2019	Fredericton	St. Thomas	2	UNB	1
8	January 4, 2020	Fredericton	St. Thomas	3	UNB	2
9	January 15, 2020	Fredericton	UNB	5	St. Thomas	1
10	October 9, 2021	Fredericton	UNB	5	St. Thomas	2
11	October 29, 2021	Fredericton	St. Thomas	4	UNB	1
12	February 11, 2022	Fredericton	St. Thomas	4	UNB	3 (SO)
13	October 7, 2022	Fredericton	St. Thomas	1	UNB	0 (SO)
14	November 4, 2022	Fredericton	UNB	2	St. Thomas	0
15	November 25, 2022	Fredericton	UNB	4	St. Thomas	0
16	January 11, 2023	Fredericton	UNB	3	St. Thomas	1
17	October 7, 2023	Fredericton	UNB	4	St. Thomas	3
18	November 1, 2023	Fredericton	UNB	4	St. Thomas	2
19	January 12, 2024	Fredericton	UNB	5	St. Thomas	2
20	February 10, 2024	Fredericton	St. Thomas	1	UNB	0 (SO)
21	October 11, 2024	Fredericton	UNB	2	St. Thomas	1 (OT)
22	November 2, 2024	Fredericton	UNB	1	St. Thomas	0 (SO)
23	November 20, 2024	Fredericton	UNB	3	St. Thomas	2
24	January 31, 2025	Fredericton	St. Thomas	3	UNB	1
25	October 17, 2025	Fredericton	St. Thomas	1	UNB	0
26	October 18, 2025	Fredericton	UNB	3	St. Thomas	0
27	January 30, 2025	Fredericton	St. Thomas	3	UNB	2 (OT)
28	January 31, 2025	Fredericton	UNB	2	St. Thomas	1
Series: UNB leads 15–13

== Awards and honours ==
=== AUS Awards ===
- Kendra Woodland, 2018-19 AUS Rookie of the Year
- Ashley Stratton, 2019-20 AUS Most Sportsmanlike Player
- Ashley Stratton, 2021-22 AUS Most Sportsmanlike Player
- Sarah Hilworth, 2021-22 AUS Coach of the Year
- Jana Headrick, 2021-22 AUS Student-Athlete Community Service Award
- Jenna MacLean, 2021-22 AUS Defensive Player of the Year
- Kendra Woodland, 2022-23 AUS Most Valuable Player
- Lilian George, 2023-24 AUS Most Valuable Player

==== AUS All-Stars ====
- Kendra Woodland, Goaltender: 2018-19 AUS First Team All-Star
- Jenna MacLean, Defence: 2018-19 AUS Second Team All-Star
- Kendra Woodland, Goaltender: 2019-20 AUS Second Team All-Star
- Jenna MacLean, Defence: 2021-22 AUS First Team All-Star
- Kendra Woodland, Goaltender: 2021-22 AUS First Team All-Star
- Jenna MacLean, Defence: 2022-23 AUS First Team All-Star
- Kendra Woodland, Goaltender: 2022-23 AUS First Team All-Star
- Lillian George, Forward: 2023-24 AUS First Team All-Star
- Mackenzie Keenan, Defence: 2023-24 AUS First Team All-Star
- Katelyn Scott, Forward: 2024-25 AUS First Team All-Star
- Mackenzie Keenan, Defence: 2024-25 AUS Second Team All-Star
- Payton Hargreaves, Forward: 2025-26 AUS First Team All-Star
- Olivia Eustace, Forward: 2025-26 AUS Second Team All-Star
- Katelyn Scott, Forward: 2025-26 AUS Second Team All-Star

==== AUS All-Rookies ====
- Kendra Woodland, Goaltender: 2018-19 AUS Rookie Team All-Star
- Jenna MacLean, 2018-19 AUS Rookie Team All-Star
- Payton Hargreaves: 2021-2022 AUS Rookie Team All-Star
- Katelyn Scott, Forward: 2023-24 AUS Rookie Team All-Star
- Robyn Brokenshire, Defence: 2023-24 AUS Rookie Team All-Star
- Hillary Wood, Forward: 2024-25 AUS Rookie Team All-Star
- Hillary Wood, Forward: 2024-25 AUS Rookie Team All-Star
- Taya Christie, Goaltender: 2025-26 AUS Rookie Team All-Star
- Keira Grant, Forward: 2025-26 AUS Rookie Team All-Star

==== Pre 2008 awards ====
- 2000-01: Lynda Robinson, Forward, AUS Rookie of the Year
- 2001-02: Emily Hobbs, Goaltender, AUS Rookie of the Year
- 2005-06: Terri Ryerson, Goaltender, AUS Rookie of the Year
- 2005-06: Meghan Ward, AUS Most Sportsmanlike Player
- 2005-06: Terri Ryerson, Goaltender, CIS All-Rookie Team

=== U Sports Awards ===
- Jana Headrick, 2022 Marion Hilliard Award
- Kendra Woodland, 2023 Brodrick Trophy

==== All-Canadians ====
- Jenna MacLean, Defence, 2018-19 All-Rookie Team
- Kendra Woodland, Goaltender, 2018-19 All-Rookie Team
- Ashley Stratton, Forward, 2019-20 Second Team
- Kendra Woodland, Goaltender, 2022-23 First Team

== Reds in pro hockey ==
Player	Position	Team(s)	League(s)	Years	Titles
Kendra Woodland	Goaltender	Ottawa Charge	PWHL	2025-present	

=== International ===
- Kendra Woodland, Goaltender, Canada: Ice hockey at the 2023 Winter World University Games (gold)
- Mackenzie Keenan, Defense, Canada: Ice hockey at the 2025 Winter World University Games (silver)

== See also ==
UNB Reds men's ice hockey
