= Lucrèce Nussbaum =

Swiss ice hockey player and coach

- Born: 7 October 1986 (age 39) Scherzingen, Switzerland
- Height: 5 ft 8 in (173 cm)
- Weight: 148 lb (67 kg; 10 st 8 lb)
- Position: Defence
- Shot: Left
- Played for: St. Thomas Tommies; EHC Illnau-Effretikon; DSC Oberthurgau
- Current coach: Mount Allison Mounties
- Coached for: St. Thomas Tommies
- National team: Switzerland
- Playing career: 2002–2010
- Coaching career: 2015–present

Lucrèce Nussbaum (born 7 October 1986) is a Swiss ice hockey coach and former Swiss national ice hockey team defenceman. She is the head coach of the Mount Allison Mounties women's ice hockey program of U Sports.

== Playing career ==
From 2006 to 2011, Nussbaum played for the St. Thomas (New Brunswick) Tommies women's ice hockey program in Fredericton, New Brunswick. For three consecutive years, she captured the Tommies team award for Best Defensive Player. In 2010, she was selected as an Atlantic University Sport Second Team All-Star.

=== International ===
Nussbaum was selected for the Switzerland national women's ice hockey team in the 2010 Winter Olympics. She played in all five games, scoring a goal and two assists. She has also appeared for Switzerland at three IIHF Women's World Championships. Her first appearance came in 2007.

== Career statistics ==
=== International career ===
Year	Team	Event	GP	G	A	Pts	PIM
2007	Switzerland	WW	4	0	0	0	4
2008	Switzerland	WW	5	1	3	4	14
2009	Switzerland	WW	4	1	0	1	6
2010	Switzerland	Oly	5	1	2	3	4

== Coaching career ==
On 30 July 2020, Nussbaum was hired to be the head coach for the Mount Allison Mounties women's ice hockey program, a member of the Atlantic University Sport conference of U Sports women's ice hockey.

== Awards and honors ==
- 2007–08 St. Thomas Defensive Player of the Year
- 2008–09: St. Thomas Defensive Player of the Year
- 2009–10: St. Thomas Defensive Player of the Year
- 2009–10 Atlantic University Sport Second Team All-Star
