= Venla Hovi =

Finnish ice hockey player and coach (born 1987)

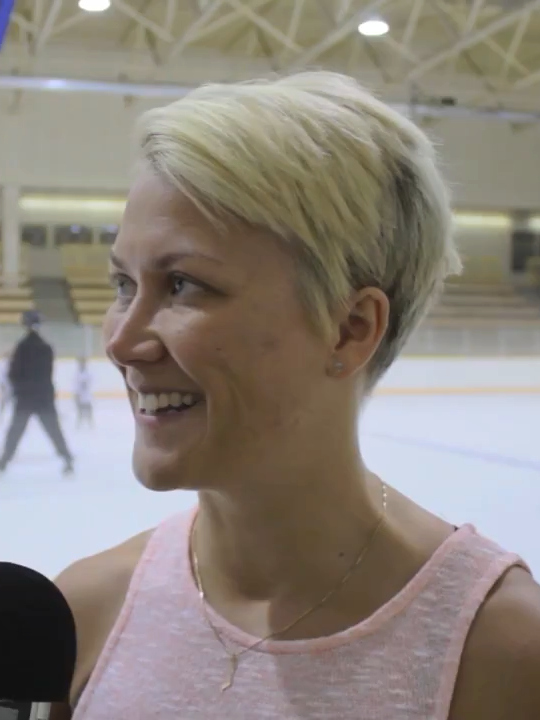
- Hovi in 2016
- Born: 28 October 1987 (age 38) Tampere, Finland
- Height: 1.69 m (5 ft 7 in)
- Weight: 67 kg (148 lb; 10 st 8 lb)
- Position: Forward
- Shot: Left
- Played for: Ylöjärvi Ilves; Tampereen Ilves; Niagara Purple Eagles; HPK Hämeenlinna; KalPa Kuopio; Herlev Hornets; Manitoba Bisons; Calgary Inferno
- Current coach: Harvard Crimson
- Coached for: Metropolitan Riveters; Manitoba Bisons
- National team: Finland
- Playing career: 2003–2019
- Coaching career: 2018–present
Medal record
Olympic Games
Bronze medal – third place	2010 Vancouver	Team
Bronze medal – third place	2018 Pyeongchang	Team
World Championship
Silver medal – second place	2019 Finland
Bronze medal – third place	2008 China
Bronze medal – third place	2009 Finland
Bronze medal – third place	2017 United States

Venla Hovi (née Heikkilä; born 28 October 1987) is a Finnish ice hockey coach and former ice hockey forward. She is an assistant coach for the Harvard Crimson women's ice hockey program, and was head coach of the Metropolitan Riveters in the Premier Hockey Federation (PHF) during the 2022–23 PHF season.

A member of the Finnish national team for over a decade, Hovi won bronze medals at the 2010 and 2018 Winter Olympic Games and at the 2008, 2009, and 2017 IIHF Women's World Championships, and a silver medal at the 2019 IIHF Women's World Championship. Hovi announced her retirement from top athletic competition the day following the achievement of silver at the 2019 Worlds.

Following her retirement, Hovi served as an on-ice instructor with True North, the Winnipeg Jets' hockey development program. She was the first woman ever to be hired as a coach by the organization and was one of a small number of women employed as on-ice instructors in the NHL or NHL affiliated programs.

== Playing career ==
In her native Finland, Hovi played in the Naisten SM-sarja (Women's Finnish Championship Series) with Ylöjärvi Ilves, Tampereen Ilves, HPK Hameenlinna, and KalPa Kuopio.

=== Canada ===
Hovi played in Canada with the University of Manitoba Bisons of U Sports. Playing out of the Wayne Fleming Arena in Winnipeg, Manitoba. Her contributions helped the Bisons defeat the University of Western Ontario Mustangs in the 2018 U Sports Women's Ice Hockey Championship and secure the team's first Golden Path Trophy. She was additionally recognized at the University of Manitoba as the 2017–18 Bison Sports Female Athlete of the Year.

Hovi played with the Calgary Inferno of the Canadian Women's Hockey League (CWHL) for the 2018–19 season. Coincidentally, she would score the first goal of her CWHL career against her Finnish national team teammate, Noora Räty, in a game versus the Shenzhen KRS Rays. Qualifying for the 2019 Clarkson Cup Finals, the Inferno would defeat Les Canadiennes de Montreal by a 5–2 tally to win the second Cup in franchise history. With the win, Hovi became the first player from Finland to win the Clarkson Cup.

== Coaching career ==
During the 2018–19 season, she served as assistant coach to the Manitoba Bisons women's ice hockey program.

In July 2019, Hovi was hired by True North as a coach in the Winnipeg Jets' Hockey Development program. She was the first woman ever to be hired as a coach by the organization and one of a small number of women working as on-ice instructors in any capacity for an NHL organization. She will be working alongside other instructors to teach players of all ages and skill levels. Reflecting on her new role, Hovi said, "It's been different but also a really fun change for myself. I don't think I should be limited to just coaching females. Same thing, Dave [Cameron (True North head on-ice instructor)] shouldn't just be coaching guys."

Hovi was named head coach of the PHF's Metropolitan Riveters in May 2022. Hovi was under contract to continue with the Riveters for the 2023–24 season when the PHF was bought out and dissolved in June 2023. She has been named as a viable head coaching candidate for the new Professional Women's Hockey League (PWHL) by outside sources.

On 30 October 2023, Harvard announced that they had hired Hovi as an assistant coach.

== Personal life ==
Hovi has a Bachelor's degree in Communications and Applied Linguistics from the University of Vaasa. She studied in the post graduate program for Teaching English as a Second or Foreign Language at the University of Manitoba.

Hovi married American ice hockey player Amanda Pelkey, who won gold at the 2018 Winter Olympics with Team USA, in August 2023. They welcomed their first child on 10 September 2024.

== Career statistics ==
Event	Goals	Assists	Points	Shots	PIM	+/-
2010 Winter Olympics	2	0	2	2	6	1
2018 Winter Olympics	1	2	3	0	2	2

== Awards and honors ==
- Manitoba Bisons Female Athlete of the Year (2017–18)
- Player of the Game, Gold Medal Game, 2018 U SPORTS Women's Hockey Championship
