= Dalhousie Tigers women's ice hockey =

University women's ice hockey program

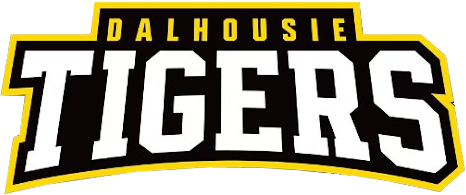
- University: Dalhousie University
- Conference: AUS
- Governing Body: U Sports
- Head coach: Keifer House; Since 2023-24 season
- Assistant coaches: Savannah Newton
- Arena: Halifax Forum; Halifax
- Colors: Black, gold, and white

U Sports tournament appearances
- 2006

The Dalhousie Tigers women's ice hockey team is an ice hockey team representing the Dalhousie Tigers athletics program of Dalhousie University. The team is a member of the Atlantic University Sport conference and compete in U Sports. The team plays their home games at the Halifax Forum in Halifax, Nova Scotia.

== History ==
Tigers assistant coach Savannah Newton, who played at the NCAA level with the Boston University Terriers, was among 18 former student-athletes selected for the 2021 U SPORTS Female Apprentice Coach Program. In celebration of International Women’s Day, involving apprentice coaches (former student-athletes) with a mentor head coach, the purpose of the program is geared towards increasing the number of women in coaching positions across Canadian universities.

=== Season-by-season Record ===
Won championship	Lost championship	Conference champions	League leader

Year	Coach	W	L	OTL	GF	GA	Pts	Finish	Conference Tournament
2019–20	Sean Fraser/Joe Johnston	6	20	2	48	95	14	7th	Did not qualify
2018–19	Sean Fraser	10	16	2	61	91	22	7th	Did not qualify
2017–18	Sean Fraser	12	12	0	61	71	24	4th	
2016–17	Sean Fraser	7	16	1	50	72	14	6th	
2015–16	Sean Fraser	9	15	0	48	66	18	6th	
2014–15	Sean Fraser	10	14	0	61	70	20	5th	
2013–14	Sean Fraser	5	13	6	49	83	16	7th	
2012–13	Sean Fraser	2	18	4	14	51	8	7th	Did not qualify
2011–12	Sean Fraser	9	9	6	68	87	24	6th	
2010–11		10	8	6	54	73	26	3rd	
2009–10		11	13	0	66	64	22	5th	

=== Season team scoring champion ===
Year	Player	GP	G	A	PTS	PIM	AUS rank
2019–20	Kennedy Whelan	28	8	7	15	14	25th
2018-19	Tara Morning	19	3	11	14	8	22nd
2017-18	Lisa MacLean	24	9	15	24	24	6th
2016-17	Lisa MacLean	24	10	12	22	10	9th
2015-16	Sarah Robichaud	24	8	10	18	10	13th
2014-15	Lisa MacLean	24	3	18	21	14	7th
2013-14	Fielding Montgomery	20	9	7	16	10	10th (tied)
2012-13	Jenna Currie	12	3	6	9	10	19th (tied)
2011-12	Jocelyn Leblanc	24	23	12	35	32	4th
2010-11	Jocelyn Leblanc	19	9	12	21	16	12th
2009-10	Jocelyn Leblanc	20	16	18	34	32	2nd

=== All-time scoring leaders ===
Player	Seasons	GP	G	A	PTS
Jocelyn LeBlanc	2007-08 to 2011-12	108	90	66	156
Kim Carcary	2004-05 to 2008-09	105	54	68	122
Leah Merkley	2003-04 to 2007-08	87	62	48	110

== International ==
- Natalie Stanwood, Defense, Canada: Ice hockey at the 2019 Winter Universiade (silver)
- Grace Beer, Goaltender, Canada: Ice hockey at the 2025 Winter World University Games (silver)

== Awards and honours ==
=== AUS honours ===
- 2002-03: Amy Graham - AUS Most Sportsmanlike Player
- 2005-06: Lesley Jordan - AUS Coach of the Year
- 2007-08: Jocelyn Leblanc - AUS Rookie of the Year

==== AUS All-Stars ====
First Team

- 2002-03: Lindsay White
- 2005-06: Leah Merkley
- 2009-10: Jocelyn Leblanc
- 2010-11: Laura Shearer
- 2014-15: Lisa MacLean
- 2016-17: Lisa MacLean

Second Team

- 2001-02: Heather MacDonald
- 2002-03: Amy Graham
- 2003-04: Leah Merkley, Lindsay White
- 2004-05: Sarah Backman, Jen Smith, Lindsay White
- 2005-06: Sarah Backman
- 2006-07: Kristen Ladouceur
- 2007-08: Jocelyn Leblanc, Laura Shearer

Second Team (cont'd)

- 2008-09: Kim Carcary, Jocelyn Leblanc
- 2009-10: Laura Shearer
- 2010-11: Jocelyn Leblanc
- 2011-12: Jocelyn Leblanc
- 2015-16: Lisa MacLean
- 2017-18: Lisa MacLean
- 2018-19: Natalie Stanwood

==== AUS All-Rookie ====
- 2005-06: Sarah Beckman
- 2006-07: Emelie Ederfors
- 2007-08: Jocelyn Leblanc
- 2009-10: Fielding Montgomery
- 2011-12: Brittany McMaken, Sarah Robichaud
- 2013-14: Lisa MacLean
- 2014-15: Jessica Severyns
- 2016-17: Fabiana Petricca

==== AUS Community Service Award ====
- 2002-03: Lori Jones
- 2005-06: Leah Kutcher
- 2009-10: Kaitlyn McNutt
- 2014-15: Sarah MacNeil
- 2015-16: Sarah MacNeil
- 2019-20: Annika Rose

=== USports honours ===
- 2005-06: Lesley Jordan, USports Coach of the Year

==== USports All-Rookie ====
- 2007-08: Jocelyn Leblanc

==== Marion Hilliard Award ====
- 2005-06: Leah Kutcher
- 2009-10: Kaitlyn McNutt

=== University Awards ===
- 2005-06: Ellen Wright - Dalhousie Tigers Athletics Female Rookie of the Year Award
- 2005-06: Leah Kutcher - Dalhousie Tigers Athletics President's Award
- 2007-08: Jocelyn LeBlanc - Dalhousie Tigers Athletics Female Rookie of the Year Award
- 2009-10: Kaitlyn McNutt - Dalhousie Tigers Athletics President's Award

=== Team Awards ===
==== Most Valuable Player ====
- 2002-03: Amy Graham
- 2003-04: Jen Smith
- 2004-05: Jen Smith
- 2005-06: Kristen Ladouceur
- 2006-07: Leah Merkley
- 2007-08: Kim Carcary
- 2008-09: Kim Carcary
- 2009-10: Jocelyn Leblanc
- 2010-11: Laura Shearer
- 2011-12: Jocelyn Leblanc
- 2012-13: Not Awarded
- 2013-14: Fielding Montgomery
- 2014-15: Lisa MacLean
- 2015-16: Sara Robichaud
- 2016-17: Lisa MacLean
- 2017-18: Lisa MacLean
- 2018-19: Fabiana Petricca
- 2019-20: Natalie Stanwood

== Tigers in professional hockey ==
= CWHL All-Star	= NWHL All-Star	= Clarkson Cup Champion	= Isobel Cup Champion

Player	Position	Team(s)	League(s)	Years	Titles
Fielding Montgomery		Brampton/Markham Thunder	CWHL		2018 Clarkson Cup

== See also ==
- Dalhousie Tigers men's ice hockey
