= Mariève Provost =

Canadian ice hockey player

- Born: April 15, 1985 (age 41) Laval, Quebec Canada
- Height: 5 ft 5 in (165 cm)
- Weight: 143 lb (65 kg; 10 st 3 lb)
- Position: Forward
- Shot: Left
- Played for: Moncton Aigles Bleues; Vienna Flyers; Stars de Montréal
- National team: Canada
- Playing career: 2006–2015
Medal record
Universiade
Gold medal – first place	2011 Erzurum	Ice hockey
Gold medal – first place	2009 Harbin	Ice hockey

Mariève Provost (born April 15, 1985) is a Canadian retired ice hockey player. During her college ice hockey with the Moncton Aigles Bleues women's ice hockey program, she became the all-time leading scorer in CIS history.

== Playing career ==
=== CIS ===
At the midway point of the 2008-09 CIS season, Provost led the CIS in scoring with 15 goals and 27 assists in 11 conference games.

In the first 12 conference games of the 2010-11 CIS season, Provost led the CIS in scoring with 30 points (14-16-30). At the midway point of that season, she ranked third in CIS all-time scoring with 205 points (105-100-205). On March 22, 2009, les Aigles Bleues participated in the bronze medal game of the 2009 CIS National Championships. Marieve Provost scored the game-winner in a shootout with a 3-2 victory over the Manitoba Bisons. Moncton was the fourth-seeded team in the tournament and captured the Atlantic conference's first-ever medal at the CIS women's hockey championship.

==== All-time points record ====
The weekend of February 12 and 13, 2011, she earned two goals and three assists over two games to increase her career totals to 108 goals and 107 assists. She reached 215 points in 102 regular season matches. Heading into the weekend, she was tied with former Alberta Pandas player Danielle Bourgeois with 106 goals. She required four points to break the scoring record of 213 set by Tarin Podloski, also from Alberta.

She scored her 107th career goal on February 12, during the power play in a 6-2 road win over Saint Mary’s. In the third period of that same game, she tied Podloski’s point record. Provost logged an assist on Valérie Boisclair’s goal. The following day, she assisted on Kristine Labrie’s goal to pick up career point 214, against St. Thomas. In overtime, Provost would assist on another goal by Boisclair, the game winning tally.

=== Hockey Canada ===
She represented Canada in their entry at the 2009 Winter Universiade, which was the first appearance for the Canadian women in ice hockey at the Universiade. Provost finished the seven game tournament with seven points (four goals, three assists). Two years later, she would play for Canada at the 2011 World Universiade, and claim a second gold medal.

== Career stats ==
=== CIS ===
Year	GP	G	A	PTS	PIM	+/-
2010-11	21	19	26	45	16	+10

=== Hockey Canada ===
Year	Event	GP	G	A	PTS	PIM	+/-
2004	Esso Women's Nationals	5	0	0	0	6	0

== Awards and honours ==
- 2010-11 Université de Moncton Female Athlete of the Year

=== AUS ===
- 2006-07 AUS Most Valuable Player
- 2009-10 AUS First Team All-Star
- 2009-10 AUS Most Valuable Player
- 2010-11 AUS Most Valuable Player

=== CIS ===
- 2007-08 CIS First Team All-Star
- 2007-08 CIS All-Rookie team
- 2009 CIS Playoff All-Star team
- 2009-10 CIS First Team All-Star
- 2010-11 CIS First Team All-Star
- 2010-11 CIS Scoring Champion
