= Mount Allison Mounties women's ice hockey =

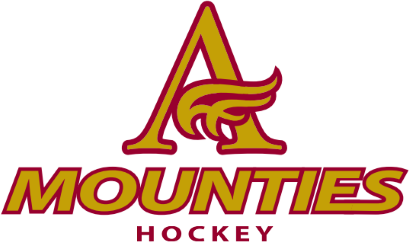
- University: Mount Allison University
- Conference: AUS
- Governing Body: U Sports
- Head coach: Addie Miles-Abbott; Since 2023-24 season
- Assistant coaches: Louis Guay; Carly Jackson
- Arena: Tantramar Veterans Memorial Civic Centre; Sackville, New Brunswick
- Colors: Garnet and Gold

The Mount Allison Mounties women's ice hockey program represents the Mount Allison University in Sackville, New Brunswick, in the Atlantic University Sport conference of U Sports. The Mounties play at Tantramar Veterans Memorial Civic Centre.

== History ==
In 2011, Andrea Switalski made program history, becoming the first Mounties player to win a major U Sports (known as Canadian Interuniversity Sport back then) Award. The recipient of the Marion Hilliard Award, said award recognizes a player who best exhibits outstanding balance between athletic achievement, academics, and community service. As a side note, Switalski had also won the Mounties Chris Young Memorial Award in 2008, recognizing the team's Rookie of the Year.

Hired on July 30, 2020, Lucrèce Nussbaum, a former member of the Switzerland women's national ice hockey team and participant in ice hockey at the 2010 Winter Olympics, was hired as head coach for the Mounties.

Former Mounties captain Kenzie Lalonde became the first female ever to do television play by play for a Quebec Major Junior Hockey League (QMJHL) game on television. Of note, she called the March 14, 2021 game between Halifax and Charlottetown for Eastlink.

=== Season-by-season record ===
Won championship	Lost championship	Conference champions	League leader

Year	Coach	W	L	OTL	Conf	GF	GA	Pts	Finish	Conference Tournament
2019–20	Terry Rhindress	3	22	3		26	92	9	8th	Did not Qualify
2018–19	Terry Rhindress									
2017–18	Terry Rhindress									

=== Team captains ===
- 2015–16: Kenzie Lalonde
- 2016–17: Kenzie Lalonde
- 2017–18: Heather Richards
- 2018–19: Heather Rae Richards
- 2019–20:

=== Season team scoring champion ===
Year	Player	GP	G	A	PTS	PIM	AUS rank
2019–20	Lauren Shaw	28	4	6	10	6	45th (tied)
2018–19	Maddy Koughan	28	10	6	16	12	15th (tied)
2017–18	Abby Beale	24	6	6	12	22	29th (tied)
2016–17	Kara Anthony	24	8	5	13	8	25th (tied)
2015–16							

== Rivals ==
University of New Brunswick

UNB Reds victories	Mount Allison victories	Tie games

No.	Date	Location	Winning team		Losing team	
1	October 13, 2018	Fredericton	Mount Allison	2	UNB Reds	1 (OT)
2	October 27, 2018	Sackville	UNB Reds	2	Mount Allison	0
3	January 13, 2019	Sackville	UNB Reds	3	Mount Allison	2
4	February 2, 2019	Fredericton	UNB Reds	2	Mount Allison	1
5	October 27, 2019	Fredericton	UNB Reds	2	Mount Allison	1 (OT)
6	November 24, 2019	Fredericton	UNB Reds	3	Mount Allison	1
7	December 1, 2019	Sackville	UNB Reds	3	Mount Allison	0
8	January 10, 2020	Sackville	UNB Reds	3	Mount Allison	2 (OT)
Series: UNB Reds leads 7–1

== International ==
- Abby Beale Canada: 2019 Winter Universiade

- Terry Rhindress, Canada: 2019 Winter Universiade Assistant Coach

== Awards and honours ==
- Andrea Switalski, 2010–11 Marion Hilliard Award

=== AUS Awards ===
- Zach Ball, 2010–11 AUS Coach of the Year
- Andrea Switalski, 2010–11 AUS Student-Athlete Community Service Award

==== AUS Most Sportsmanlike Player ====
- 2011–12: Ashlynn Somers
- 2012–13: Ashlynn Somers
- 2013–14: Courtney King
- 2018–19: Heather Richards

==== AUS All-Stars ====
- 2009-10 AUS Second Team All-Stars: Meghan Corley-Byrne, Mount Allison

=== Team Awards ===
Chris Young Memorial Award (Rookie of the Year)

- 2007–08: Andrea Switalski, Defense
- 2014–15: Kelsey MacDougall
- 2015–16: Heather Richards
- 2016–17: EmmaRae Murphy
- 2018–19: Samantha Jarron
- 2019-20: Lauren Steele

Most Valuable Player

- 2014–15: Kenzie Lalonde
- 2015–16: Keri Martin
- 2016–17: Jennifer Bell
- 2018–19: Heather Richards
- 2019-20: Bianca Zak

=== University Awards ===
- 2020 Mount Allison Donald Cameron Manager's Award: Laura Hopper
- 2018 Mount Allison Overall University Rookie of the Year (female): Abby Beale
- 2017 Bubsy Grant Award: Zach Ball Head Coach

==== Outstanding Senior Female Athlete ====
- 2020 Mount Allison Outstanding Senior Female Athlete: Rhiannon Ford
- 2015 Mount Allison Outstanding Scholar Athlete Award: Kate O'Brien
- 2016 Mount Allison Outstanding Senior Female Athlete: Amanda Volcko
- 2017 Mount Allison Outstanding Senior Female Athlete: Kelsey MacDougall

==== Gigi Hicks Sportsmanship Award ====
- 2015 Gigi Hicks Sportsmanship award: Amanda Volcko
- Heather Richards: 2019 Gigi Hicks Sportsmanship award

== See also ==
Mount Allison Mounties men's ice hockey
