= Manitoba Bisons women's ice hockey =

- University: University of Manitoba
- Conference: Canada West
- Head coach: Jordan Colliton; 1st season, 15–17–0
- Captain: Kylie Lesuk
- Arena: Wayne Fleming Arena at Max Bell Centre; Winnipeg, Manitoba
- Colors: Brown, Gold, and White

The Manitoba Bisons are an ice hockey team that represents the University of Manitoba. They compete in the Canada West Universities Athletic Association in the Canadian Interuniversity Sport athletic program. Home games are contested at the Wayne Fleming Arena (located at 109 Sidney Smith St) in Winnipeg, Manitoba.

== History ==
On March 22, 2009, the Bisons challenged the Moncton Aigles Bleues women's ice hockey program in the bronze medal game of the 2009 CIS national women's ice hockey championship. Marieve Provost of Moncton scored the game-winner in a shootout with a 3-2 victory over Manitoba, as Moncton captured the Atlantic conference's first-ever medal at the CIS women's hockey championship.

In 2018, the program would win its first-ever national championship. Contested on March 18, the Bisons blanked the Western Mustangs women's ice hockey program in a 2-0 shutout victory.

== Year by year ==
3rd Place CIS Tournament	Conference champions	Qualified for CIS Tournament

Year	Record	Head coach	GF	GA
2000-01	7-5-0		33	30
2001-02	6-6-0		40	53
2002-03	4-13-3		49	75
2003-04	6-13-1		33	79
2004-05	7-11-2	Jon Rempel	41	66
2005-06	7-9-4	Jon Rempel	41	46
2006-07	15-9-0	Jon Rempel	62	48
2007-08	18-4-2	Jon Rempel	72	38
2008-09	21-2-1	Jon Rempel	97	38
2009-10	18-6-0	Jon Rempel	63	46
2010-11	16-5-3	Jon Rempel	75	36
2011-12	12-8-4	Jon Rempel	66	55
2012-13	10-12-6	Jon Rempel	63	79
2013-14	17-13-0	Jon Rempel	70	60
2014-15	23-14-0	Jon Rempel	96	69
2015-16	18-19-0	Jon Rempel	78	68
2016-17	21-11-0	Jon Rempel	94	53
2017-18	29-7-0	Jon Rempel		
2018-19	21-11-0	Sean Fisher (interim)		
2019-20	10-18-0	Jon Rempel		
2020-21	None	Jon Rempel		
2021-22	13-9-0	Jon Rempel		
2022-23	12-16-0	Jon Rempel		
2023-24	10-20-0	Jordy Zacharias (Interim)		
2024-25				

== USports Tournament results ==
In Progress

Year	Seed	Round	Opponent	Result	
2019	2019	#6	First Round; Consolation Bracket; Fifth place game	#3 Guelph #7 PEI #8 Toronto	L 3–2; W 3–1; W 2–0

== Awards and honours ==
- Jon Rempel: 2017-18 Bison Sports Coach of the Year

=== University Awards ===
- 2017-18 BISON SPORTS ROOKIE OF THE YEAR - Female: Lauren Taraschuk
- 2017-18 BISON SPORTS STUDENT-ATHLETE LEADERSHIP & COMMUNITY DEVELOPMENT AWARD Female: Alana Serhan

==== Bisons Athlete of the Year ====
Year	Award	Name
2008–09	Manitoba Bisons Female Athlete of the year	Stacey Corfield
2011–12	Manitoba Bisons Female Athlete of the year	Addie Miles
2016–17	Manitoba Bisons Female Athlete of the year	Lauryn Keen
2017–18	Manitoba Bisons Female Athlete of the year	Venla Hovi

- Stacey Corfield, Manitoba Bisons Female Athlete of the Year (2008–09)
- Addie Miles, Manitoba Bisons Female Athlete of the Year (2011–12)
- Lauryn Keen, Manitoba Bisons Female Athlete of the Year (2016–17)
- Venla Hovi, Manitoba Bisons Female Athlete of the Year (2017–18)

=== CIS awards ===
Year	Award	Recipient
2009-10	CIS Rookie of the Year	Caitlin MacDonald
2009-10	CIS First Team All-Star	Caitlin MacDonald

=== USports awards ===
- Venla Hovi, Player of the Game, Gold Medal Game, 2018 U SPORTS Women’s Hockey Championship
- Lauryn Keen, 2018 U SPORTS Women’s Hockey Championship Tournament Most Valuable Player
- Caitlin Fyten, 2018 U SPORTS Women’s Hockey Championship Tournament All-Star Team
- Lauryn Keen, 2018 U SPORTS Women’s Hockey Championship Tournament All-Star Team
- Alanna Sharman, 2018 U SPORTS Women’s Hockey Championship Tournament All-Star Team

==== USports All-Canadians ====
- Caitlin MacDonald, 2012-13 USports Second Team All-Star

=== Canada West awards ===
- Lauryn Keen: Canada West Female First Star of the Week (the week ending March 18, 2018)

Year	Award	Recipient
2007-08	Canada West Rookie of the Year	Addie Miles
2009-10	Canada West Marion Hilliard Award	Stacy Corfield
2009-10	Canada West Rookie of the Year	Caitlin MacDonald

==== Canada West All-Star selections ====
- First Team

Year	Player	Position
2007-08	Stacy Corfield	Canada West First Team All-Stars
2007-08	Breanna Leary	Canada West First Team All-Stars
2009-10	Stacy Corfield	Canada West First Team All-Stars
2009-10	Caitlin MacDonald	Canada West First Team All-Stars
2017-18	Erica Rieder	Defense, Canada West First Team All-Stars
2017-18	Jordyn Zacharias	Forward, Canada West First Team All-Stars
2025-26	Aimee Patrick	Forward, Canada West First Team All-Stars

- Second Team

Year	Player	Position
1999-00	Pam Staples	Canada West Second Team All-Star
1999-00	Trina Rathgeber	Canada West Second Team All-Star
1999-00	Amber Rommelaere	Canada West Second Team All-Star
2007-08	Leanne Kisil	Canada West Second Team All-Stars
2007-08	Chantal Larocque	Canada West Second Team All-Stars
2009-10	Addie Miles	Canada West Second Team All-Stars
2010-11	Addie Miles	Canada West Second Team All-Stars
2010-11	Tara Lacquette	Canada West Second Team All-Stars
2010-11	Caitlin MacDonald	Canada West Second Team All-Stars
2011-12	Addie Miles	Canada West Second Team All-Stars
2011-12	Nellie Minshull	Canada West Second Team All-Stars
2017-18	Alanna Sharman	Canada West Second Team All-Stars
2025-26	Louise Fergusson	Canada West Second Team All-Stars

=== Canada West All-Rookie Team ===
Year	Player	Position
2017-18	Sheridan Oswald	Forward
2017-18	Lauren Taraschuk	Goaltender
2017-18	Lauren Warkentin	Defense
2019-20	Kate Gregoire	Forward
2024-25	Paige Fischer	Goaltender
2025-26	Sarah Harbus	Forward

=== Team MVP ===
Year	Recipient
1998-99	Pam Staples
1999-00	Amber Rommelaere
2000-01	Amber Rommelaere
2002-03	Sharla Cowling
2003-04	Kristin Nickel
2004-05	Kristin Nickel
2005-06	Leanne Kisil
2006-07	Meghan "The boss" Ross
2007-08	Stacey Corfield
2008-09	Stacey Corfield
2009-10	Stacey Corfield
2024-25	Kylie Lesuk

== International ==
- Caitlin MacDonald, Canada, 2010 IIHF World Women's U18 Championship (Gold Medal)
- Venla Hovi, Finland, Ice hockey at the 2018 Winter Olympics – Women's tournament

=== Winter Universiade ===
- Stacey Corfield, 2009 Winter Universiade
- Addie Miles, Canada, 2011 Winter Universiade, Gold Medal
- Maggie Litchfield-Medd - Manitoba Canada: 2015 Winter Universiade
- Erica Rieder, Defence, Canada: 2017 Winter Universiade
- Alanna Sharman, Forward, Canada: 2017 Winter Universiade
