= Saint Mary's Huskies women's ice hockey =

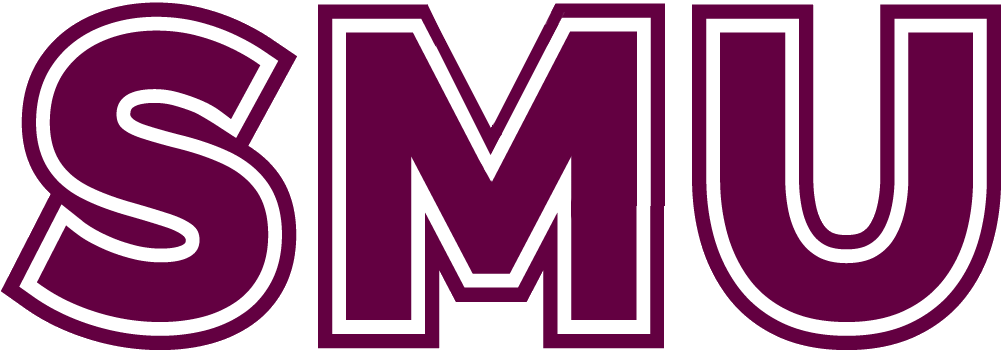
- University: Saint Mary's University
- Conference: AUS
- Governing Body: U Sports
- Head coach: Chris Larade
- Assistant coaches: Steve Axford; Amanda Boulegon; Brian Bradbury; Phil Wright
- Arena: Halifax, Nova Scotia
- Colors: Maroon, White, and Black
- Mascot: The Husky

U Sports tournament appearances
- 1998, 2003, 2004, 2010, 2016, 2017, 2018

Conference tournament champions
- 1998, 2003, 2004, 2010, 2016, 2017, 2018

The Saint Mary's Huskies women's ice hockey program represents Saint Mary's University in Halifax, Nova Scotia, in the sport of ice hockey in the Atlantic University Sport conference of U Sports. The Saint Mary's Huskies have won seven AUS championships in their program history while also making seven appearances in the U Sports women's ice hockey championship tournament since its inception in 1998.

== History ==
=== Season-by-season Record ===
Won championship	Lost championship	Conference champions	League leader

Year	Coach	W	L	OTL	SOL	GF	GA	Pts	Finish	Conference Tournament
2019–20	Chris Larade	22	5	0	1	90	42	45	First	
2017–18										
2016–17										
2015–16										
2014–15										
2013–14										
2012–13										
2011–12										

=== Season team scoring champion ===
Year	Player	GP	G	A	PTS	PIM	AUS rank
2019–20	Shae Demale	28	12	17	29	22	3rd
2018–19	Shae Demale	28	13	8	21	22	8th
2017–18	Breanna Lanceleve	24	10	18	28	4	2nd
2016–17	Breanna Lanceleve	24	15	24	39	8	2nd
2015–16	Breanna Lanceleve	24	11	17	28	4	1st
2014–15	Breanna Lanceleve	22	6	14	20	10	8th
2013–14							
2012–13							

=== All-time scoring leaders ===
Player	Seasons	GP	G	A	PTS
Lindsay Taylor	2002-03 to 2006-07	74	80	104	184
Courtney Schriver	2004-05 to 2007-08, 2010 to 11	96	84	83	167
Breanne Lanceleve	2013-14 to 2017-18	118	57	82	139
Kori Cheverie	2005-06 to 2009-10	105	78	59	137

== International ==
- Breanna Lanceleve Canada: 2015 Winter Universiade
- Abigail McKenzie, Defense, Canada: Ice hockey at the 2025 Winter World University Games (silver)

== Awards and honors ==
=== Academic All-Canadian ===
- Kori Cheverie: 2006-07 CIS Academic All-Canadian
- Shae Demale: 2018-19 USports Academic All-Canadian

=== AUS honours ===
- Ellen Laurence, 2019-20 AUS Rookie of the Year

==== AUS Community Service Award ====
- Kori Cheverie: 2006-07 AUS Student-Athlete Community Service Award, nominee CIS Marion Hilliard Award
- Kori Cheverie: 2007-08 AUS Student-Athlete Community Service Award, nominee CIS Marion Hilliard Award
- Kori Cheverie: 2008-09 AUS Student-Athlete Community Service Award, nominee CIS Marion Hilliard Award
- Beatrice Harrietha: 2016-17 AUS Student-Athlete Community Service Award, nominee CIS Marion Hilliard Award
- Beatrice Harrietha: 2017-18 AUS Student-Athlete Community Service Award, nominee CIS Marion Hilliard Award

==== AUS Most Valuable Player ====
- 2000-01, Tasha Noble
- 2001-02, Tasha Noble
- 2002-03, Kerrie Boyle
- 2003-04, Lindsay Taylor
- 2004-05, Lindsay Taylor
- 2005-06, Courtney Schriver

==== AUS Rookie of the Year ====
- 2002-03: Lindsay Taylor
- 2004-05: Courtney Schriver
- 2012-13: Sienna Cooke
- 2013-14: Breanne Lanceleve
- 2015-16: Rebecca Clark
- 2019-20: Ellen Laurence

==== AUS Most Sportsmanlike Player ====
- 2006-07, Zoe Launcelott
- 2007-08, Zoe Launcelott
- 2008-09, Zoe Launcelott
- 2017-18, Breanna Lanceleve

==== AUS Coach of the Year ====
- 2001-02: Lisa MacDonald
- 2002-03: Lisa MacDonald
- 2015-16: Chris Larade
- 2016-17: Chris Larade
- 2019-20: Chris Larade

==== AUS All-Stars ====
First Team

- Kori Cheverie: 2006-07 AUS First Team All-Star
- Kori Cheverie: 2007-08 AUS First Team All-Star
- Kori Cheverie: 2009-10 AUS First Team All-Star
- Kiana Wilkinson, 2019-20 AUS First Team All-Star

Second Team

- Shae Demale, 2018-19 AUS Second Team All-Star
- 2016-17 AUS Second Team All-Stars: Rebecca Clark
- 2016-17 AUS Second Team All-Stars: Caitlyn Manning

==== AUS All-Rookie ====
- 2018-19 AUS All-Rookie Team: Caleigh Meraw, Defense
- 2018-19 AUS All-Rookie Team: Shae Demale, Forward

==== Team awards ====
- Kori Cheverie: 2006-07 Saint Mary's Female Athlete of the Year
- Kori Cheverie: 2007-08 Saint Mary's Female Athlete of the Year
- Kori Cheverie: 2006-07 Most Valuable Player for St. Mary's women's hockey
- Kori Cheverie: 2007-08 Most Valuable Player for St. Mary's women's hockey
- Kori Cheverie: 2008-09 Most Valuable Player for St. Mary's women's hockey
- Kiana Wilkinson: 2019-20 Most Valuable Player for St. Mary's women's hockey

=== U Sports Awards ===
- Lisa MacDonald, 2002-03 CIS SPORTS Coach of the Year (co-recipient)
- Chris Larade, 2015-16 U SPORTS Coach of the Year
- Chris Larade, 2016-17 U SPORTS Coach of the Year

==== U Sports All-Rookie Team ====
- Sienna Cooke: 2012-13 USports All-Rookie Team
- Rebecca Clark: 2015-16 U Sports All-Rookie Team

==== U Sports Rookie of the Year ====
- Lindsay Taylor, 2002-03 U SPORTS Rookie of the Year
- Courtney Schriver, 2004-05 U SPORTS Rookie of the Year

==== U Sports All-Canadians ====
- Breanna Lanceleve, 2015-16 U Sports Second Team All-Canadian
- Breanna Lanceleve, 2017-18 U Sports Second Team All-Canadian
- Kiana Wilkinson, 2019-20 U Sports Second Team All-Canadian

==== USports nationals ====
- Caitlyn Schell: Player of the Game, Huskies vs. Western Mustangs (March 18, 2016)

=== University Awards ===
- Kiana Wilkinson, Saint Mary's Female Athlete of the Year (2020)
- Shae Demale, Saint Mary's Athletics President's Award (2020)
- Ellen Lawrence, Saint Mary's Female Athletics Rookie of the Year (2020)

== Huskies in professional hockey ==
= CWHL All-Star	= NWHL All-Star	= Clarkson Cup Champion	= Isobel Cup Champion

Player	Position	Team(s)	League(s)	Years	Titles
Kori Cheverie	Forward	Toronto Furies	CWHL		2014 Clarkson Cup
Kiana Wilkinson	Forward	Shenzhen KRS Vanke Rays	Zhenskaya Hockey League		

== See also ==
Saint Mary's Huskies men's ice hockey
