= Howie Draper =

Canadian hockey coach (born 1967)

- Born: April 3, 1967 (age 59) Edmonton, Alberta, Canada
- Height: 5 ft 9 in (175 cm)
- Weight: 165 lb (75 kg; 11 st 11 lb)
- Position: Defence
- Played for: University of Alberta
- Current U Sports coach: University of Alberta
- Coached for: PWHL New York
- Playing career: 1985–1990
- Coaching career: 1997–present
Medal record
Representing Canada
Women's ice hockey, assistant coach
World Championship
| Silver medal – second place | 2009 Canada |

Howie Draper (born April 3, 1967) is a Canadian ice hockey coach for the University of Alberta. He has the most wins of any head coach in U Sports women's ice hockey history and was the inaugural head coach of PWHL New York.

== Career ==
Prior to his coaching career, Draper played five years of college ice hockey at the University of Alberta, totalling nine goals and 48 points in 115 games.

Draper coached the University of Alberta women's ice hockey team from 1997 to 2023, winning 14 Canada West titles and eight national championships, more than any other coach in U Sports women's ice hockey history. On January 10, 2020, Draper became the first coach to surpass 600 wins since the addition of women's hockey to U Sports with a 3–0 victory over Mount Royal University. He was named coach of the year in 2002, 2004, 2009, and 2019.

On September 15, 2023, the newly established Professional Women's Hockey League (PWHL) announced the coaches for its inaugural six franchises, including Draper as head coach of New York. New York struggled immensely under Draper, finishing in last place with a 5-4-3-12 record and at one point going over two months without a regulation win. Players on the team had reportedly asked for a change in coaching staff, with some describing the culture of the team as "toxic". On May 11, 2024, Draper and New York mutually agreed that he would not return as head coach in the fall. He remained on the team's staff as a special advisor within the scouting department.

Draper returned as head coach for the University of Alberta in the 2024–25 season.

In 2025, Draper was inducted into the Alberta Hockey Hall of Fame.

== Career statistics ==
| | | | Regular season | | | | | Playoffs |
| Season | Team | League | GP | G | A | Pts | PIM | GP | G | A | Pts | PIM |
|---|---|---|---|---|---|---|---|---|---|---|---|---|
| 1985–86 | University of Alberta | CW | 26 | 2 | 5 | 7 | 36 | — | — | — | — | — |
| 1986–87 | University of Alberta | CW | 43 | 2 | 8 | 10 | 55 | — | — | — | — | — |
| 1987–88 | University of Alberta | CW | 12 | 0 | 5 | 5 | 22 | — | — | — | — | — |
| 1988–89 | University of Alberta | CW | 27 | 2 | 12 | 14 | 48 | — | — | — | — | — |
| 1989–90 | University of Alberta | CW | 25 | 3 | 11 | 14 | 28 | — | — | — | — | — |
| CIAU totals | | | 115 | 9 | 39 | 48 | 179 | — | — | — | — | — |

== Head coaching record ==
=== U Sports ===
| National Tournament champions | Conference champions |

| Season | Conf. Record | Overall | Postseason |
| 1997–98 | None | 3–1–0 | Fifth, CIAU tournament |
| 1998–99 | 4–1–1 | 20–8–3 | Second, CIAU tournament |
| 1999–00 | 15–1–1 | 26–3–1 | CIAU tournament champions |
| 2000–01 | 13–1–2 | 20–6–2 | Did not qualify |
| 2001–02 | 16–0–0 | 33–1–0 | CIS tournament champions |
| 2002–03 | 19–0–1 | 34–0–1 | CIS tournament champions |
| 2003–04 | 20–0–0 | 35–0–0 | CIS tournament champions |
| 2004–05 | 20–0–0 | 28–1–0 | Second, CIS tournament |
| 2005–06 | 16–1–3 | 27–3–3 | CIS tournament champions |
| 2006–07 | 21–3 | 33–4–1 | CIS tournament champions |
| 2007–08 | 21–2–1 | 29–5–1 | Fourth, CIS tournament |
| 2008–09 | 22–2 | 26–5 | Did not qualify |
| 2009–10 | 23–1–0 | 33–1 | CIS tournament champions |
| 2010–11 | 17–7 | 25–14 | Fifth, CIS tournament |
| 2011–12 | 14–10 | 23–16 | Fifth, CIS tournament |
| 2012–13 | 16–12 | 25–16 | Did not qualify |
| 2013–14 | 20–8 | 23–11 | Did not qualify |
| 2014–15 | 20–8 | 28–14 | Eighth, CIS tournament |
| 2015–16 | 16–12 | 21–14 | Did not qualify |
| 2016–17 | 21–7 | 36–9 | U Sports tournament champions |
| 2017–18 | 19–9 | 27–12 | Did not qualify |
| 2018–19 | 23–5 | 33–7 | Fourth, U Sports tournament |
| 2019–20 | 20–8 | 28–10 | Tournament cancelled due to COVID-19 pandemic. |
| 2020–21 | Cancelled due financial reasons caused by the COVID-19 pandemic | | |
| 2021–22 | 13–7 | 22–11 | Did not qualify |
| 2022–23 | 21–7 | 28–12 | Did not qualify |

=== PWHL ===
| Team | Year | Regular season | | | | | | | Postseason | | | |
| Team | Year | G | W | OTW | OTL | L | Pts | Finish | W | L | Win% | Result |
|---|---|---|---|---|---|---|---|---|---|---|---|---|
| NYC | 2023–24 | 24 | 5 | 4 | 3 | 12 | 26 | 6th | — | — | — | Missed playoffs |
| NYC total | | 24 | 5 | 4 | 3 | 12 | | | — | — | — | 0 playoff appearances |
