= 2026 U Sports Women's Ice Hockey Championship =

Canadian university ice hockey championship

- Season: 2025–26
- Teams: Eight
- Finals site: Woolwich Memorial Centre; Elmira, Ontario
- Champions: Montreal Carabins (3rd title)
- Runner-up: Concordia Stingers
- Winning coach: Isabelle Leclaire
- Tournament MVP: Maude Desroches (Montreal)
- Television: CBC

The 2026 U Sports Women's Ice Hockey Championship was held from March 19 to March 22, 2026, in Elmira, Ontario, to determine a national champion for the 2025–26 U Sports women's ice hockey season. The tournament was hosted by the Waterloo Warriors. The Montreal Carabins won their third national title defeating their conference rivals, the Concordia Stingers, by a score of 5–2.

== Host ==
The tournament was played at Woolwich Memorial Centre in Elmira, Ontario. This was the second time that the University of Waterloo had hosted the tournament after the school also hosted the previous year's championship.

== Scheduled teams ==
Seed	Team	Qualified	Record	Last	Total
1	UBC Thunderbirds	CW Champion	26–2–0	None	0
2	Concordia Stingers	RSEQ Champion	22–2–0	2024	4
3	Guelph Gryphons	OUA Champion	19–4–3	2019	1
4	UNB Reds	AUS Champion	20–6–2	None	0
5	Ottawa Gee-Gees	OUA Finalist	15–9–2	None	0
6	Waterloo Warriors	OUA West Semi-Finalist (Host)	17–8–1	None	0
7	Manitoba Bisons	CW Finalist	13–9–6	None	0
8	Montreal Carabins	RSEQ Finalist	13–9–2	2016	2

== Championship bracket ==
First Round: March 19-20
1	UBC Thunderbirds	3
8	Montreal Carabins	4 (SO)
4	UNB Reds	2 (SO)
5	Ottawa Gee-Gees	1
2	Concordia Stingers	3
7	Manitoba Bisons	1
3	Guelph Gryphons	2
6	Waterloo Warriors	0

Semi-Finals: March 21
8	Montreal Carabins	5
4	UNB Reds	1
2	Concordia Stingers	2 (OT)
3	Guelph Gryphons	1

Gold Medal Game: March 22
8	Montreal Carabins	5
2	Concordia Stingers	2
Bronze Medal Game: March 22
4	UNB Reds	2
3	Guelph Gryphons	1

== Consolation bracket ==
Semi-Finals: March 21
7	Manitoba Bisons	0
6	Waterloo Warriors	2
1	UBC Thunderbirds	2
5	Ottawa GeeGees	0

Fifth Place Game: March 22
6	Waterloo Warriors	2
1	UBC Thunderbirds	7
