= 2025 U Sports Women's Ice Hockey Championship =

Canadian university ice hockey championship

- Season: 2024–25
- Teams: Eight
- Finals site: Woolwich Memorial Centre; Elmira, Ontario
- Champions: Bishop's Gaiters (1st title)
- Runner-up: Waterloo Warriors
- Winning coach: Valerie Bois (1st title)
- Tournament MVP: Gabrielle Santerre (Bishop's)
- Television: CBC Sports

The 2025 U Sports Women's Ice Hockey Championship was held March 20–23, 2025, in Elmira, Ontario, to determine a national champion for the 2024–25 U Sports women's ice hockey season. The RSEQ champion Bishop's Gaiters defeated the host Waterloo Warriors in the gold medal game to win the program's first national championship.

== Host ==
The tournament was played at Woolwich Memorial Centre in Elmira, Ontario. This was the first time that the University of Waterloo had hosted the tournament.

== Scheduled teams ==
| Seed | Team | Qualified | Record | Last | Total |
|---|---|---|---|---|---|
| 1 | Alberta Pandas | CW Champion | 24–4 | 2017 | 8 |
| 2 | Toronto Varsity Blues | OUA Champion | 17–9 | 2001 | 1 |
| 3 | Bishop's Gaiters | RSEQ Champion | 10–11 | None | 0 |
| 4 | St. Francis Xavier X-Women | AUS Champion | 18–10 | None | 0 |
| 5 | Concordia Stingers | RSEQ Finalist | 20–1 | 2024 | 4 |
| 6 | UBC Thunderbirds | CW Finalist | 25–3 | None | 0 |
| 7 | UNB Reds | AUS Finalist | 21–7 | None | 0 |
| 8 | Waterloo Warriors | OUA Finalist (Host) | 18–8 | None | 0 |

== Championship bracket ==
First Round: March 20-21
1 | Alberta Pandas | 0
8 | Waterloo Warriors | 3
4 | St. Francis Xavier X-Women | 2
5 | Concordia Stingers | 5
2 | Toronto Varsity Blues | 2
7 | UNB Reds | 0
3 | Bishop's Gaiters | 4 (OT)
6 | UBC Thunderbirds | 3

Semi-Finals: March 22
8 | Waterloo Warriors | 5
5 | Concordia Stingers | 1
2 | Toronto Varsity Blues | 1
3 | Bishop's Gaiters | 2

Gold Medal Game: March 23
8 | Waterloo Warriors | 0
3 | Bishop's Gaiters | 3
Bronze Medal Game: March 23
5 | Concordia Stingers | 1
2 | Toronto Varsity Blues | 3

== Consolation bracket ==
Semi-Finals: March 22
1 | Alberta Pandas | 3
4 | St. Francis Xavier X-Women | 0
7 | UNB Reds | 1
6 | UBC Thunderbirds | 5

Fifth Place Game: March 23
1 | Alberta Pandas | 1
6 | UBC Thunderbirds | 5
