= 1975 in ice hockey =

The following is a chronicle of events during the year 1975 in ice hockey.

== National Hockey League ==
- Art Ross Trophy as the NHL's leading scorer during the regular season: Bobby Orr, Boston Bruins
- Hart Memorial Trophy: for the NHL's Most Valuable Player: Bobby Clarke, Philadelphia Flyers
- Stanley Cup - Philadelphia Flyers defeat the Buffalo Sabres in the 1975 Stanley Cup Finals
- With the first overall pick in the 1975 NHL Amateur Draft, the Philadelphia Flyers selected Mel Bridgman

== Canadian Hockey League ==
- Ontario Hockey League: The Toronto Marloboros defeated the Hamilton Fincups to win the J. Ross Robertson Cup.
- Quebec Major Junior Hockey League:The Sherbrooke Castors won President's Cup (QMJHL) for the first time in team history
- Western Hockey League: The New Westminster Bruins won President's Cup (WHL) for the first time in team history
- Memorial Cup: Toronto Marlboros defeat New Westminster Bruins

== World Hockey Championship ==
  - Men's champion: The Soviet Union men's national ice hockey team won their 14th world championship.

== Minor League hockey ==
- AHL: The Springfield Indians defeated the New Haven Nighthawks to win the Calder Cup
- IHL: The Toledo Goaldiggers won the Turner Cup.
- North American Hockey League: The Johnstown Jets won the Lockhart Cup
- Southern Hockey League: The Charlotte Checkers won the James Crockett Cup
- Barrie Flyers win the Allan Cup

== Junior A hockey ==
* World Hockey Association *

== University hockey ==
- Michigan Tech won the NCAA Division I Men's Ice Hockey Tournament

== Women's hockey ==
In 1975, the Bishop's Gaiters women's ice hockey team from Sherbrooke, Quebec, hosted the Women's Invitational Hockey Tournament. The 1975 participants included the Loyola Tommies, University of Toronto and Dawson College. The Loyola Tommies captured the championship, defeating Toronto in the final.

== Season articles ==
1974–75 NHL season	1975–76 NHL season
1974–75 AHL season	1975–76 AHL season

== See also ==
- 1992 in sports
