= McCaw Cup =

Annual ice hockey trophy in Ontario

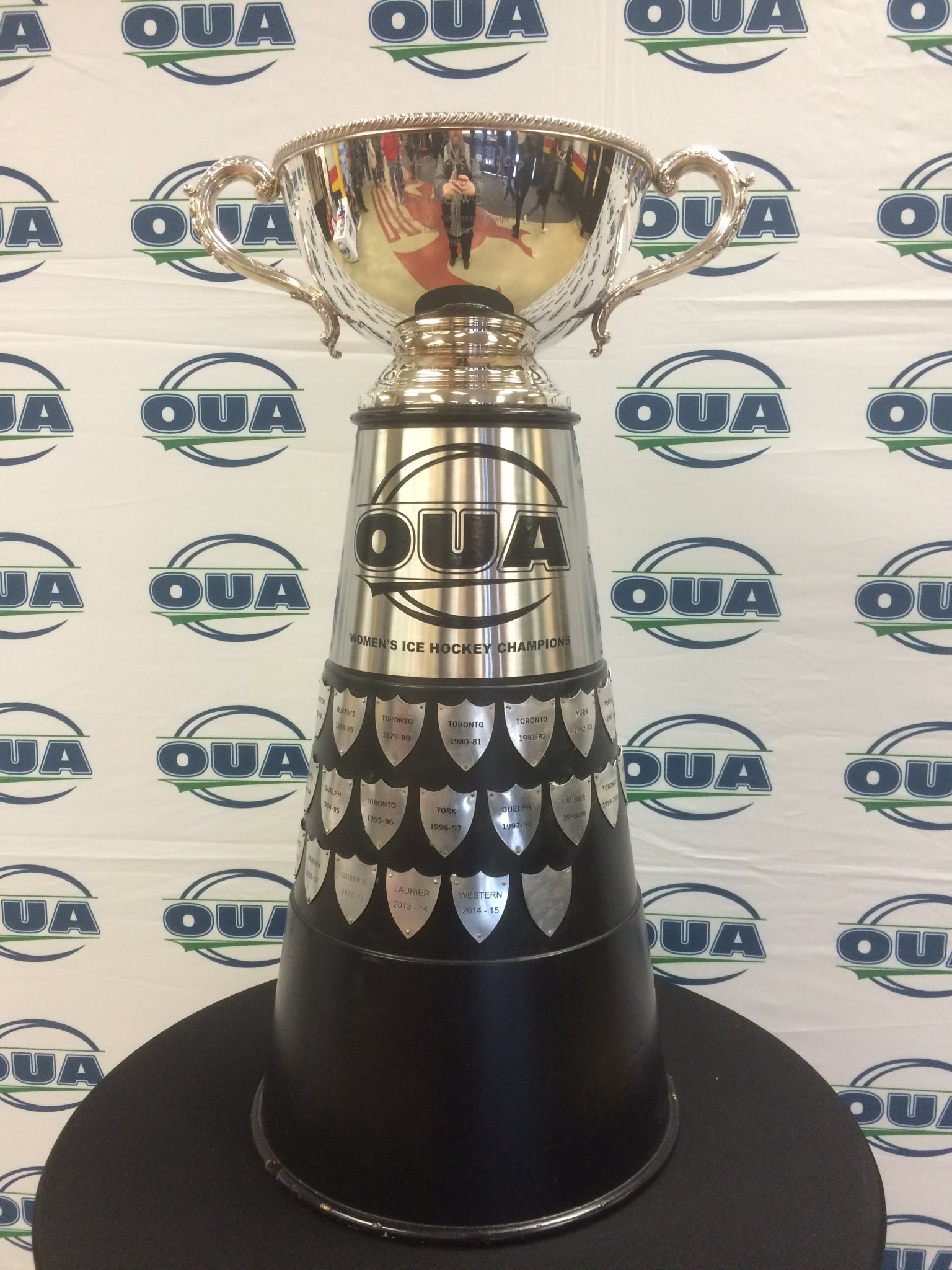
- Sport: Ice Hockey
- League: Ontario University Athletics
- Awarded for: OUA champion in U Sports women's ice hockey

History
- First award: 1922
- First winner: Toronto Varsity Blues
- Most wins: Toronto Varsity Blues (41)
- Most recent: Toronto Varsity Blues

The McCaw Cup (colloquially known as the Judy, formerly the WIAU ice hockey trophy and the Dr. Judy McCaw Trophy) is a trophy awarded annually to the provincial champion in collegiate women's ice hockey of the Ontario University Athletics conference of U Sports. Originally named the WIAU ice hockey trophy, it was rededicated by the University of Guelph in 1972 to Dr. Judy McCaw, an Anglo-Québécois veterinarian and professor at the university.

The McCaw Cup differs from its counterpart in men's collegiate hockey, the Queen's Cup, as it features teams only from Ontario universities. Unlike the women's conferences which are separated into the OUA in Ontario and the RSEQ in Québec, all three men's collegiate ice hockey teams in Québec compete in the OUA for the Queen's Cup.

== History ==
From 1922 to 1971, the trophy was known as the Women's Intercollegiate Athletic Union (WIAU) Ice Hockey Trophy. Until 1998 it was the highest award in women's collegiate ice hockey, as there was no national governing body over women's inter-university hockey. Following the 1971 season, the WIAU merged with the Ontario-Québec University Athletic Association to form the Ontario Women's Interuniversity Athletic Association (OWIAA) and the cup was renamed to the Judy McCaw Trophy, which was then shortened to the McCaw Cup following the merger of the men's and women's leagues to the OUA in 1998.

Following the establishment of a national championship in 1998, the recipient of the cup would go on to represent the conference at the national tournament. Currently, both the champion and the runner-up are granted berths at the U Sports national championship, with the recipient of the cup given the higher seed at the tournament.

== McCaw Cup Championship ==
In the OUA's current format, the 4 best teams in each division play in best of 5 quarter-final and semi-final matchups to determine who will play in the single elimination final known as the McCaw Cup Championship. Historically, a 4 team playoff has been used to determine the champion.

*	Denotes team that went on to win National Championship (post-1998)
Team (#)	Denotes the number of times team had been awarded McCaw Cup at that time

=== WIAU (1922 - 1971) ===
Year	Champion
1922	Toronto Varsity Blues
1923	Toronto Varsity Blues (2)
1924	Toronto Varsity Blues (3)
1925	Toronto Varsity Blues (4)
1926	Queen's Gaels
1927	Toronto Varsity Blues (5)
1928	Toronto Varsity Blues (6)
1929	Toronto Varsity Blues (7)
1930	Toronto Varsity Blues (8)
1931	Queen's Gaels (2)
1932	Toronto Varsity Blues (9)
1933	Toronto Varsity Blues (10)
1934	Toronto Varsity Blues (11)
1935	Toronto Varsity Blues (12)
1936 - 1948	Not Awarded
1949	Toronto Varsity Blues (13)
1950	Toronto Varsity Blues (14)
1951 - 1960	Not Awarded
1961	Toronto Varsity Blues (15)
1962	Toronto Varsity Blues (16)
1963	Toronto Varsity Blues (17)
1964	Toronto Varsity Blues (18)
1965	Toronto Varsity Blues (19)
1966	Toronto Varsity Blues (20)
1967	Guelph Gryphons
1968	Guelph Gryphons (2)
1969	Guelph Gryphons (3)
1970	Guelph Gryphons (4)
1971	McMaster Marauders

=== OWIAA (1972 - 1997) ===
Year	Champion
1972	Guelph Gryphons (5)
1973	Queen's Gaels (3)
1974	Guelph Gryphons (6)
1975	Queen's Gaels (4)
1976	McMaster Marauders (2)
1977	Queen's Gaels (5)
1978	McMaster Marauders (3)
1979	Queen's Gaels (6)
1980	Toronto Varsity Blues (21)
1981	Toronto Varsity Blues (22)
1982	Toronto Varsity Blues (23)
1983	York Lions
1984	Toronto Varsity Blues (24)
1985	Toronto Varsity Blues (25)
1986	Toronto Varsity Blues (26)
1987	York Lions (2)
1988	Toronto Varsity Blues (27)
1989	Toronto Varsity Blues (28)
1990	Toronto Varsity Blues (29)
1991	Toronto Varsity Blues (30)
1992	Toronto Varsity Blues (31)
1993	Toronto Varsity Blues (32)
1994	Toronto Varsity Blues (33)
1995	Toronto Varsity Blues (34)
1996	Toronto Varsity Blues (35)
1997	York Lions (3)

=== OUA (1998 - present) ===
Year	Champion	Runner up	Score
1998	Guelph Gryphons (7)		
1999	Laurier Golden Hawks		
2000	Toronto Varsity Blues (36)		
2001	Toronto Varsity Blues (37)		
2002	Laurier Golden Hawks (2)		
2003	Toronto Varsity Blues (38)		
2004	Laurier Golden Hawks (3)		
2005	Laurier Golden Hawks (4)		
2006	Laurier Golden Hawks (5)		
2007	Laurier Golden Hawks (6)		
2008	Laurier Golden Hawks (7)		
2009	Laurier Golden Hawks (8)		
2010	Laurier Golden Hawks (9)		
2011	Queen's Gaels (7)		
2012	Laurier Golden Hawks (10)		
2013	Queen's Gaels (8)		
2014	Laurier Golden Hawks (11)		
2015	Western Mustangs		
2016	Guelph Gryphons (8)		
2017	Guelph Gryphons (9)		
2018	Western Mustangs (2)	Queen's Gaels	3-0
2019	Guelph Gryphons (10)	Toronto Varsity Blues	4-2
2020	Toronto Varsity Blues (39)	York Lions	3-1
2021	Season Cancelled due to COVID-19 pandemic		
2022	Brock Badgers	Nipissing Lakers	3-1
2023	Toronto Varsity Blues (40)	Nipissing Lakers	2-1
2024	Waterloo Warriors	Toronto Varsity Blues	2-1 (OT)
2025	Toronto Varsity Blues (41)	Waterloo Warriors	3-2

== Championships by Team ==
The Toronto Varsity Blues have won the most championships with 41, who were also the inaugural recipients of the cup in 1922. The Queen's Gaels were the second team to win the cup four years later in 1926, and it was not until the Guelph Gryphons won the cup 39 years later in 1967 that a team other than the Blues or the Gaels had won.

The cup was not awarded in 1936–1948, as well as from 1951 to 1960 after several teams had withdrawn from the conference. The cup has been continually awarded since 1961, with the exception of the 2021 season, which was cancelled due to the COVID-19 pandemic.

Team	Wins	Last
Toronto Varsity Blues	41	2025
Laurier Golden Hawks	11	2014
Guelph Gryphons	10	2019
Queen's Golden Gaels	9	2013
McMaster Marauders	3	1978
York Lions	3	1997
Western Mustangs	2	2018
Brock Badgers	1	2022
Waterloo Warriors	1	2024
