= Autumn MacDougall =

Canadian ice hockey player (born 1997)

- Born: July 5, 1997 (age 28) Cole Harbour, Nova Scotia, Canada
- Height: 156 cm (5 ft 1 in)
- Position: Forward
- Shoots: Left
- SDHL team Former teams: Leksands IF: Montreal Force; Buffalo Beauts; Alberta Pandas
- Playing career: 2015–present

Autumn MacDougall (born July 5, 1997) is a Canadian ice hockey forward, currently playing in the Swedish Women's Hockey League (SDHL) with Leksands IF. She was selected fourteenth overall by the Buffalo Beauts in the 2020 NWHL Draft, becoming the first U Sports women's ice hockey player to ever be selected in a draft of the National Women's Hockey League (NWHL; renamed PHF in 2021).

== Playing career ==
MacDougall played college ice hockey with the Alberta Pandas ice hockey program in the Canada West conference of U Sports. Across five seasons with the program, she recorded 58 goals and 67 assists for 126 points in 139 regular season games. She finished as the sixth highest point leader in program history, winning the Canada West Championship twice and the national championship in 2017.

She was drafted in the third round, 14th overall by Buffalo in the 2020 NWHL Draft. She signed her first professional contract with the team ahead of the 2020–21 NWHL season.

== Career statistics ==
			Regular season					Playoffs
Season	Team	League	GP	G	A	Pts	PIM	GP	G	A	Pts	PIM
2015-16	Alberta Pandas	U Sports	27	4	4	8	2	–	–	–	–	–
2016-17	Alberta Pandas	U Sports	28	11	10	21	2	–	–	–	–	–
2017-18	Alberta Pandas	U Sports	28	12	18	30	2	5	0	2	2	2
2018-19	Alberta Pandas	U Sports	28	14	21	35	4	2	0	1	1	0
2019-20	Alberta Pandas	U Sports	28	17	14	31	4	4	2	2	4	2
2020–21	Buffalo Beauts	NWHL	6	3	0	3	0	–	–	–	–	–
2021–22	Buffalo Beauts	PHF	20	5	9	14	4	1	0	0	0	0
2022–23	Buffalo Beauts	PHF	8	1	1	2	0	–	–	–	–	–
2022–23	Montreal Force	PHF	13	0	2	2	2	–	–	–	–	–
2023–24	Leksands IF	SDHL	34	6	7	13	8	3	0	1	1	0
U Sports totals			139	58	67	125	14	11	2	5	7	2
PHF totals			47	9	12	21	6	1	0	0	0	0
