= 1976 in ice hockey =

The following is a chronicle of events during the year 1976 in ice hockey.

== Olympics ==
The men's tournament at the 1976 Winter Olympics in Innsbruck, Austria, was the 13th Olympic Championship. The Soviet Union won its fifth gold medal. Czechoslovakia gained the silver, while West Germany obtained the bronze medal. Games were held at the Olympiahalle Innsbruck. Vladimir Shadrin was the scoring champion with 14 points.

== National Hockey League ==
- Art Ross Trophy as the NHL's leading scorer during the regular season: Guy Lafleur
- Hart Memorial Trophy: for the NHL's Most Valuable Player: Bobby Clarke
- Stanley Cup - Montreal Canadiens defeat the Philadelphia Flyers in the 1976 Stanley Cup Finals. Reggie Leach of the Flyers captured the Conn Smythe Trophy.
- With the first overall pick in the 1976 NHL Amateur Draft, the Washington Capitals selected Rick Green

== Minor League hockey ==
- American Hockey League: The Nova Scotia Voyageurs won the Calder Cup
- IHL: Dayton Gems won the Turner Cup.
- United Hockey League: Colonial Cup.
- Southern Hockey League: The Charlotte Checkers won the James Crockett Cup

== University hockey ==
- The Minnesota Golden Gophers men's ice hockey team, led by head coach Herb Brooks, won the NCAA Division I Men's Ice Hockey Tournament

== Women's hockey ==
The Bishops University Gaiters women's ice hockey team hosted a Women's Invitational Hockey Tournament. The participants also included John Abbott College, University of New Brunswick Red Blazers and Dawson College. John Abbott captured the championship, while Bishop's defeated Dawson College in double overtime for third place.

== Season articles ==
1975–76 NHL season	1976–77 NHL season
1975–76 AHL season	1976–77 AHL season

== See also ==
- 1976 in sports
