= Waterloo Warriors women's ice hockey =

University ice hockey team in Canada

- University: University of Waterloo
- Conference: OUA; West Division
- Governing Body: U Sports
- First season: 2002-2003
- Head coach: Shaun Reagan; Since 2011-12 season
- Assistant coaches: Dollee Meigs (Associate Coach); Amanda Smith
- Arena: Columbia Icefield Arena; Waterloo
- Colors: Black and Gold

U Sports tournament appearances
- 2024, 2025, 2026 (Note: Will automatically qualify as host school in both 2025 and 2026)

Conference tournament champions
- 2024

The Waterloo Warriors women's ice hockey team represents the University of Waterloo in the Ontario University Athletics women's ice hockey conference of U Sports. The team plays at Columbia Icefield Arena, located on the north side of the University's main campus, in a complex on the same site as Warrior Field. Former ice hockey player Shaun Reagan has served as head coach since the 2011-12 season.

The Waterloo Warriors have won the McCaw Cup once, in 2024. They have made one appearance at the U Sports National Championship in 2024, finishing in fourth place. The Warriors are also set to host and appear at both the 2025 and 2026 National Championships at the Woolwich Memorial Centre in Elmira, Ontario.

== History ==
=== Bill Antler era ===
Joining the OUA conference in the 2002-03 season, having formerly been as a club team at the university, the Warriors were led by head coach Bill Antler. His coaching staff for the inaugural season included assistant coaches Roger McKenzie and Mike Cinelli. Serving as the first captain in Warriors history, Lindsay Wood played for the program until 2005, part of a foundation of competitive players including Sarah McNaught and Lindsay Wood. Finishing fourth in the OUA Western Division for their inaugural season, the club finished ahead of the Western Mustangs, who would become one of their biggest rivals.

=== Mike Kadar era ===
During the 2005-2006 season, the Warriors clinched their first playoff berth under interim head coach Mike Kadar. Having also served as the Strength and Conditioning Coach for the NHL’s Los Angeles Kings, Kadar joined the Warriors due to the NHL Player Lockout. Facing the Brock Badgers in their first-ever playoff series, the Warriors were unable to qualify for the next round.

=== Geraldine Heaney era ===
With Kadar returning to the Kings the next autumn, the 2005-2006 season featured a new head coach. Winter Games gold medalist Geraldine Heaney, a member of the Hockey Hall of Fame, took the reins, with a coaching staff that included Mike Stankowitsch, Jerry Harrigan and Bradi Cochrane. Heaney stepped down from the role in May 2011.

=== Shaun Reagan era ===
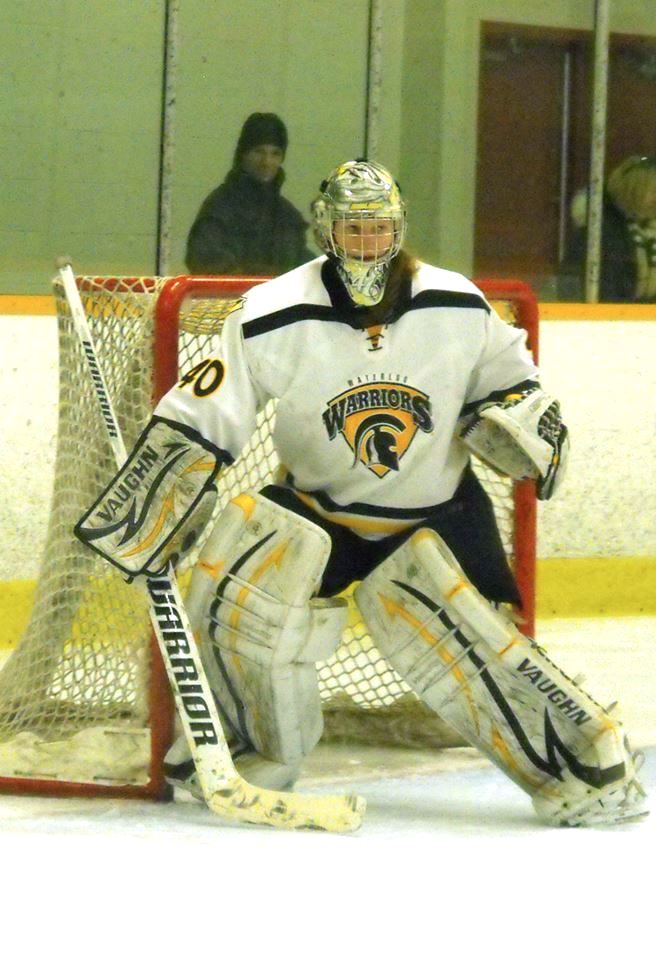
Warriors women's goalie in 2014

Following the 2011 season, the Warriors hired former OHL player and schoolteacher Shaun Reagan, a lifelong resident of Waterloo who had been the inaugural coach of the Kitchener-Waterloo Rangers of the OWHA since 2008.

Following several years of consistent regular season success and OUA playoff appearances following the COVID-19 pandemic, the Warriors' most successful season came in 2023-24 when they defeated the Laurier Golden Hawks and York Lions in the quarter and semi-finals of the OUA playoffs, advancing to the McCaw Cup final and granting them a spot in the U Sports National Championship for the first time. In the OUA final, the Warriors faced defending provincial champions Toronto at Varsity Arena, defeating them on the road 2-1 in overtime to win their first provincial championship in program history. At their first national championship appearance, the Warriors defeated AUS finalists St. Francis Xavier 6-1 but were defeated by RSEQ champions Concordia 3-1 in the semi-final, who went on to win the national title. In the third place match against RSEQ finalists Montréal, they opened the scoring in the first period but fell short after the Carabins tied the game in the third period forcing overtime and a shootout, and were defeated 2-1.

=== Season team scoring champion ===
League leader

Year	Player	GP	G	A	PTS	PIM
2025-26	Carly Orth	26	10	12	22	40
2024-25	Carly Orth	24	11	20	31	28
2023-24	Leah Herrfort	25	14	13	27	14
2022-23	Leah Herrfort	23	15	21	36	16

== U Sports Tournament Results ==
Year	Seed	Round	Opponent	Result
2024	#4	First Round; Semi-Final; Bronze Medal Game	#5 St. Francis Xavier #1 Concordia #7 Montréal	W 6–1; L 3–1; L 2–1 (SO)
2025	#8	First Round; Semi-Final; Gold Medal Game	#1 Alberta #5 Concordia #3 Bishop's	W 3–0; W 5–1; L 3–0

== Awards and honours ==
=== OUA honours ===
- Shaun Reagan: 2011-12 OUA Coach of the Year
- Taytum Clairmont: 2019-20 OUA Scoring Champion
- Taytum Clairmont: 2020 OUA Forward of the Year
- Taytum Clairmont: 2020 OUA Most Valuable Player
- Carly Orth, 2024-25 OUA Player of the Year
- Kara Mark, 2024-25 OUA Goaltender of the Year

==== OUA Rookie of the Year ====
- Rebecca Bouwhuis: 2011-12
- Rachel Marriott: 2013-14
- Stephanie Sluys: 2014-15

==== OUA All-Stars ====
- Taytum Clairmont: 2019-20 OUA First Team All-Star
- Kara Mark: 2024-25 OUA First Team All-Star
- Carly Orth: 2024-25 OUA First Team All-Star
- Lyndsay Acheson: 2024-25 OUA Second Team All-Star

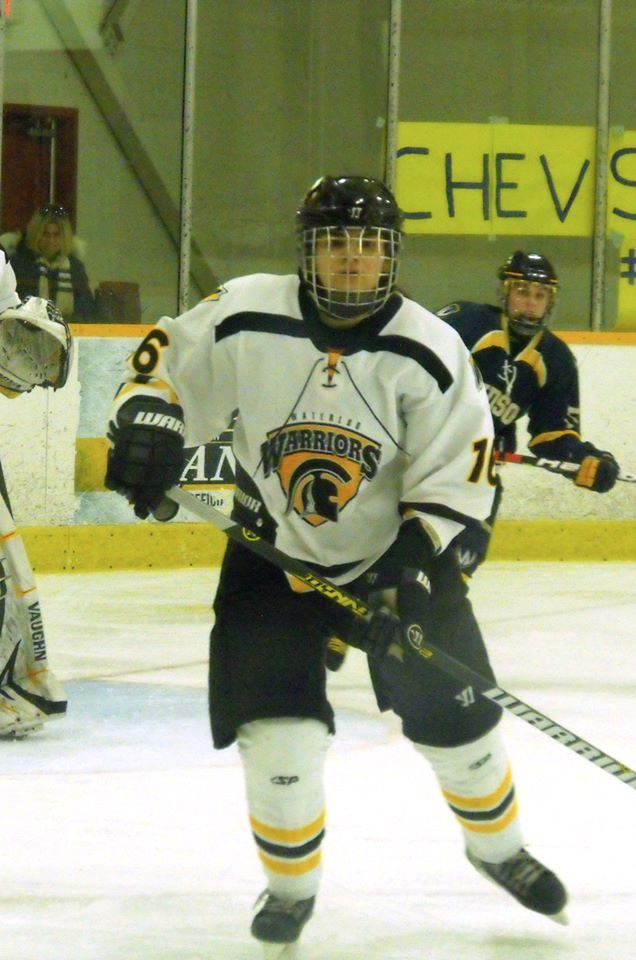
Warriors women's player in 2014

==== OUA All-Rookie ====
- Rebecca Bouwhuis: 2011-12 OUA All-Rookie Team
- Rachel Marriott: 2013-14 OUA All-Rookie Team
- Stephanie Sluys: 2014-15 OUA All-Rookie Team
- Mikayla Schnarr: 2019-20 OUA All-Rookie Team
- Gracey Smith: 2024-25 OUA All-Rookie Team

=== USports honours ===
- Taytum Clairmont, U SPORTS Female Athlete of the Month in November 2019

- Lynsey Acheson, 2025 USPORTS National Championship All-Tournament Team
- Kassidy McCarthy, 2025 USPORTS National Championship All-Tournament Team

==== All-Canadian ====
- Taytum Clairmont: 2020 U SPORTS second-team All-Canadian

==== USports All-Rookie ====
- Rebecca Bouwhuis: 2011-12 USports All-Rookie

== Warriors in professional hockey ==
Player	Position	Team(s)	League(s)	Years	Titles
Taytum Clairmont	Forward	Toronto Six	NWHL		

=== International ===
- Leah Herrfort, Forward Canada: Ice hockey at the 2025 Winter World University Games (silver)
