= Ontario Sledge Hockey Association =

Ice hockey league in Canada

- Current season, competition or edition: 2024–25 OSHA season
- Sport: Sledge Hockey
- Founded: 2004
- President: James Titmarsh
- No. of teams: 20+
- Countries: Canada; USA
- Website: www.ontariosledge.com

The Ontario Sledge Hockey Association, is the governing body for sledge hockey in Ontario, Canada. The league was founded in 2004, and its main goals are to develop and promote a positive sledge hockey experience. The league is also an associate member of the Ontario Hockey Federation and a member of Hockey Canada. The league works closely with Sledge Team Ontario, the provincial sledge hockey team, to develop elite players.

== History ==
Throughout the leagues history, the Ontario Sledge Hockey Association has had over 20 different sledge hockey clubs from around most of Ontario, as well a few from the USA, and been home to over 400 players including some who have gone on to play for the Canada Sledge Hockey team. Depending on how many teams register for the league each year the divisions are different. usually there is an elite division (which can include national team players), intermediate division, open division, mixed division (all players over 16) and a junior division. The open, mixed and junior divisions do not allow body checking.

== Member Teams 2024–2025 ==
Ontario Sledge Hockey Association
Division	Team	City/Town	Arena
Intermediate-East	Elmvale Bears	Elmvale, Ontario	North Simcoe Sports and rec. Centre
Intermediate-East	Markham Islanders	Markham, Ontario	RJ Clatworthy Arena
Intermediate-East	Northumberland Predators	Northumberland County, Ontario	Bewdley Community Centre
Intermediate-East	Durham Steelhawks	Durham, Ontario	Iroquois Park Sports Centre
Intermediate-East	Kawartha Blazers	Peterborough, Ontario	Minskin Law Community Complex
Intermediate-East	Cruisers Silver Streaks	Mississauga, Ontario	Iceland Arena
Intermediate-West	Windsor Ice Bullets	Windsor, Ontario	Libro Credit Union Centre
Intermediate-West	Buffalo Sabres	Buffalo, New York	Cornerstone Arena
Intermediate-West	Kitchener Rangers	Kitchener, Ontario	RIM Park
Intermediate-West	Niagara Thunderblades	Niagara, Ontario	Vale Health and Wellness Centre
Intermediate-West	London Blizzard	London, Ontario	Western Fair Sports Centre
Intermediate-West	Hamilton Sledgehammers	Hamilton, Ontario	Chedoke Arena
Open-West	Elgin Imperials	Elgin County, Ontario	East Elgin Community Complex
Open-West	Woolwich Thrashers	Elmira, Ontario	Woolwich Memorial Centre
Open-West	Sarnia Ice Hawks	Sarnia, Ontario	Clearwater Arena
Open-West	Cruisers Red Dawgs	Mississauga, Ontario	Iceland Arena
Open-West	London Blizzard	London, Ontario	Western Fair Sports Centre
Open-East	Elmvale Bears	Elmvale, Ontario	North Simcoe Sports and rec. Centre
Open-East	Hamilton Sledgehammers	Hamilton, Ontario	Chedoke Arena
Open-East	Buffalo Sabres	Buffalo, New York	Cornerstone Arena
Open-East	Markham Islanders	Markham, Ontario	RJ Clatworthy Arena
Open-East	Kawartha Blazers	Peterborough, Ontario	Minskin Law Community Complex
Junior	Hamilton Sledgehammers jr	Hamilton, Ontario	Chedoke Arena
Junior	Mississauga Cruisers jr	Mississauga, Ontario	Iceland Arena
Junior	Woolwich Thrashers jr	Elmira, Ontario	Woolwich Memorial Centre

== Other related competitions ==
The Ontario Sledge Hockey Association also holds two annual sledge hockey tournaments, these tournaments are the Cruisers Cup tournament held in the first weekend of November, and the London Blizzard Invitational held the third weekend of January. These tournaments bring sledge hockey teams from all over the world.

== Past Champions ==
2022: Intermediate B- Cruisers All Blacks, Intermediate C- Kawartha Blazers, Open Division- Elgin Imperials, Open Mixed- Ottawa Senators, Junior Division- Elmvale Cubs

2023: Intermediate A- Cruisers All Blacks, Intermediate B-Durham Steelhawks Intermediate C- Windsor Ice Bullets, Open Division- Woolwich Thrashers, Mixed Division- Cruisers Red Dawgs

2024: Intermediate A- Durham Steelhawks, Intermediate C- Northumberland Predators, Open West- Woolwich Thrashers, Open East- Kawartha Blazers. Junior Division- Hamilton Sledgehammers
