= U Sports women's ice hockey =

University sport competition in Canada

- Formerly: CIAU women's ice hockey, CIS women's ice hockey
- Sport: Ice hockey
- Founded: 1997; 29 years ago
- No. of teams: 35, in four conferences
- Country: Canada
- Most recent champion: Montreal Carabins
- Most titles: Alberta Pandas (8)
- Website: usports.ca/wice

U Sports women's ice hockey is the highest level of play of women's ice hockey at the university level under the auspices of U Sports, Canada's governing body for university sports. Women's ice hockey has been played in U Sports since the 1997-98 season, when the governing body was known as the Canadian Interuniversity Athletics Union, following a long stint of teams only competing in the OUA. There are 35 teams, all of which are based in Canada, that are divided into four conferences that are eligible to compete for the year-end championship. As these players compete at the university level, they are obligated to follow the rule of standard eligibility of five years.

== History ==
The 1890s marked the beginning of the first women's ice hockey teams in Canadian universities. These universities included the University of Toronto in Toronto, Queen's University in Kingston, and McGill University in Montreal. In 1908, other schools such as the Calgary Collegiate Institute and Mount Royal University began to ice competitive teams as well. In the early years, teams played behind closed doors and men were not authorized to attend the matches. The referee was the only man present during the matches.

Starting in 1900, male spectators were authorized to assist in women's matches in most of the Canadian provinces and some university teams. During this time, there was no university women's league and some university women's teams competed against rivals representing cities. Sometimes, they were forced to cross big geographical distances by train in order to participate in tournaments

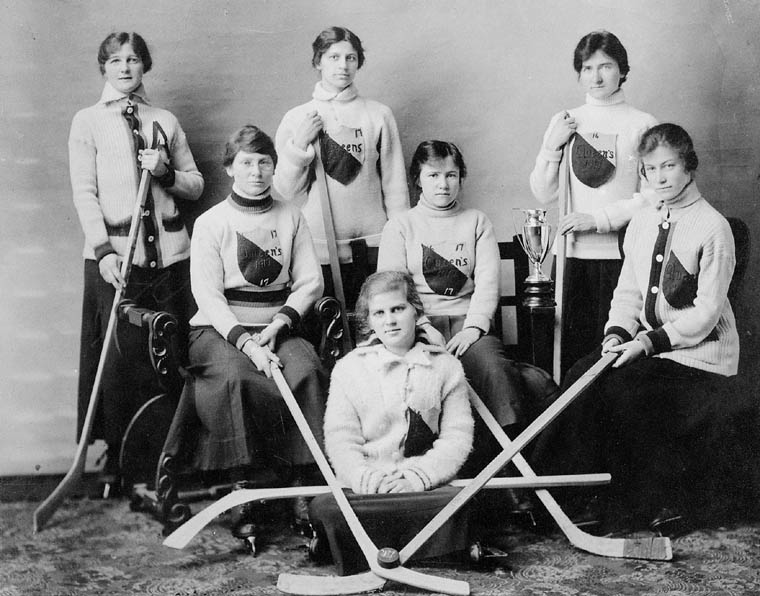
Queen's University women's ice hockey team in 1917

The first provincial women's championship took place in 1914 in Picton, Ontario. Six teams participated in the event, including the University of Toronto. In 1921, the University of Toronto bested McGill University during the first Canadian women's university championship. The Toronto Lady Blues would gain 11 championship titles, compared with two titles for the Queen's Golden Gaels before the women's university league dissolved in 1933 During this time period, Elizabeth Graham, a Queen's University goaltender, carried a fencing mask during matches in 1927. She would be the first goaltender in ice hockey, before the famous Jacques Plante, to carry a protective face mask.

Laurentian Voyageurs visit Windsor Lancers in Tecumseh, Ontario (October 2013)

On December 16, 1922, the Ladies Ontario Hockey Association (LOHA) was formed, and included several Ontario university teams In 1923, the Women's Intercollegiate Athletic Union (WIAU) is created with the aim of offering sporting events to students in Ontario. The WIAU coordinated the programs of the students, and several university women's teams were members there. In the autumn of 1923, the Canadian Amateur Hockey Association held its annual meeting in Port Arthur, Ontario. It was here that the association decided not to give to the women official recognition as hockey players. From 1931 until 1941, the non-university team Preston Rivulettes were unbeaten in the LOHA and won ten consecutive championships. Numerous university women's teams are reluctant to join the LOHA because they estimated that they would be unable to compete against the Rivulettes. Due to the Great Depression, several university women's teams were dissolved. Consequently, ice hockey teams became rarer for numerous women's teams.

In 1941, the LOHA was dissolved and, in the aftermath, several teams begin to disappear. The Second World War also affected the level of participation in women's ice hockey in Canada. From 1936 to 1948, and from 1951 to 1960, there was no WIAU official women's competition. Women’s ice hockey would not return until the 1960s at the Canadian university level.

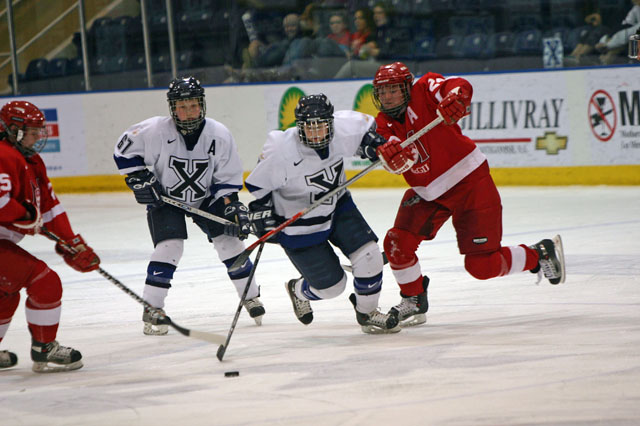
McGill Martlets against St. Francis-Xavier X-Women

The revival in the 1960s resulted in the creation of new women's teams in several Canadian universities. In 1969, the Canada West Universities Athletic Association, with a mission to organize championships in multiple sports for women university students in Western Canada, presented a proposal which eventually led to the creation of the Canadian Women's Intercollegiate Athletic Union (CWIAU). The first recognized national women's championship was in volleyball, presented in March, 1970 at the University of Waterloo. While the CWIAU had been created, university women's ice hockey was still not prevalent outside Ontario, where the Women's Intercollegiate Athletic Union (WIAU) merged with the Ontario-Quebec University Athletic Association (OQUAA) to form the Ontario Women's Interuniversity Athletic Association (OWIAA) in 1971. This resulted in university women's teams multiplying and several American university tournaments inviting Canadian teams. Regional women's university ice hockey championships began to grow elsewhere in Canada, and in March 1998, the first Canadian national university championship in women’s ice hockey took place. The Concordia Stingers, in Montreal, hosted the event and won the first U Sports championship.

== Schedule structure ==
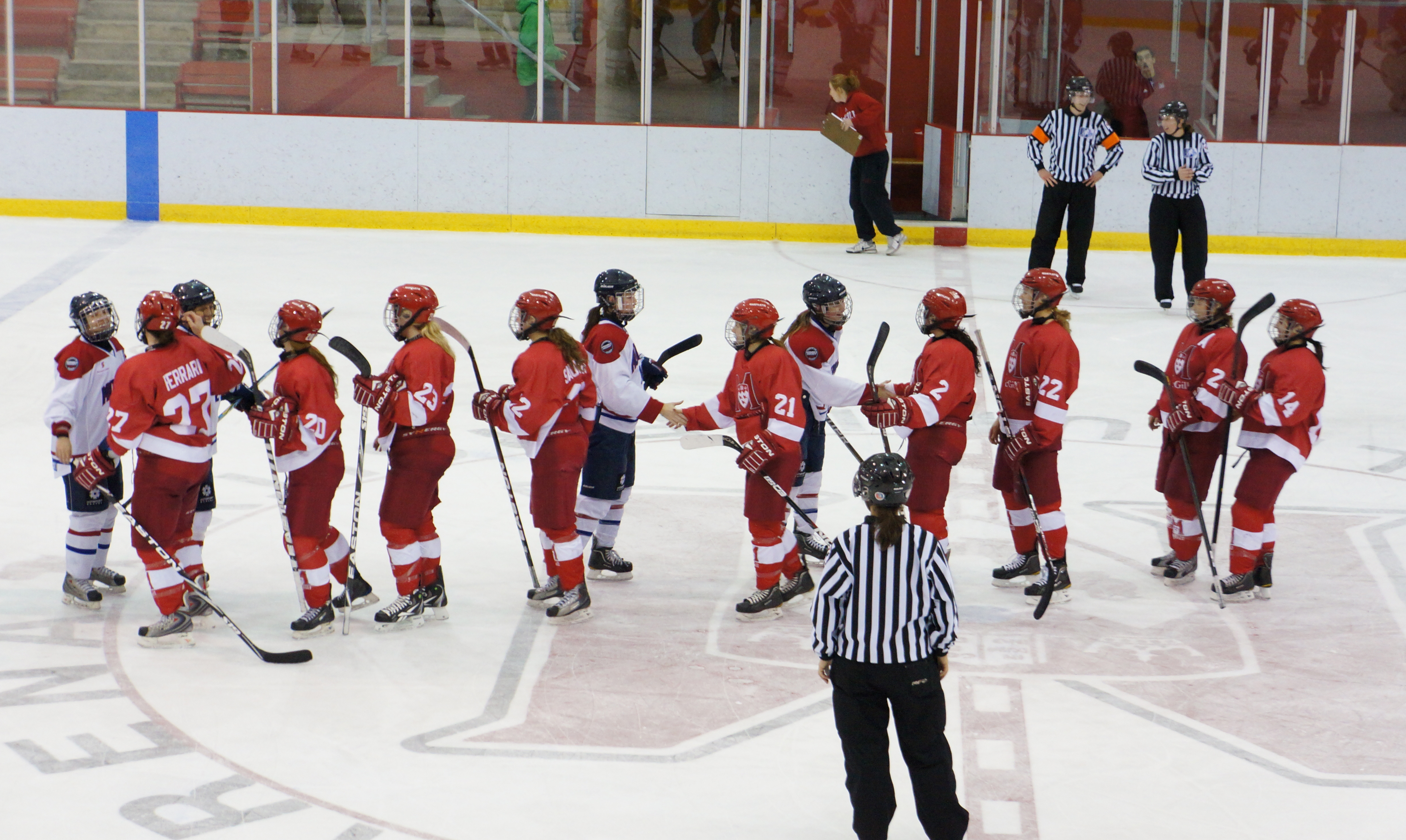
U Sports encourages competition with a sense of fair-play

In the U Sports regular season, 36 teams play between 24 and 28 matches in their respective regional conferences. At the end of the season, qualifying rounds (in each regional conference) determine the champion team in each of the four Canadian regions. Afterwards, a national tournament takes place consisting of eight teams: the winning team in each of the four regional championship conferences; (Atlantic University Sport, Quebec Student Sports Federation (in French, Réseau du sport étudiant du Québec), Ontario University Athletics and Canada West Universities Athletic Association). In addition, the organizing team of the national tournament (the university which hosts the annual event) and the defending champion, as well as the finalist from all four conferences qualify.

== Participating universities ==
As of the 2023–24 season, the Canadian university women's ice hockey competition consisted of four conferences and 35 teams. In recent history, the Lethbridge Pronghorns dropped their program following the 2019-20 season. The Bishop's Gaiters program joined the RSEQ conference in 2020–21 while the Trinity Western Spartans and MacEwan Griffins programs became members of the Canada West conference that same year. However, following the cancellation of the 2020–21 season, the Laurentian Voyageurs discontinued their women's ice hockey program in 2021.

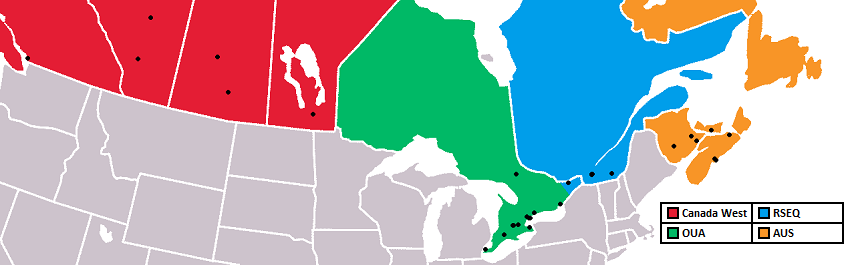

=== Atlantic University Sport ===
University	Varsity Name	City	Province	School Founded	Arena	Arena Capacity
Dalhousie University	Tigers	Halifax	NS	1818	Halifax Forum	5,600
Université de Moncton	Aigles Bleues	Moncton	NB	1864	J. Louis Levesque Arena	1,200
Mount Allison University	Mounties	Sackville	NB	1839	Tantramar Veterans Memorial Civic Centre	750
University of Prince Edward Island	Panthers	Charlottetown	PEI	1969	MacLauchlan Arena	
Saint Mary's University	Huskies	Halifax	NS	1802	Alumni Arena	1,000
St. Francis Xavier University	X-Women	Antigonish	NS	1853	Charles V. Keating Centre	1,500
St. Thomas University	Tommies	Fredericton	NB	1910	Grant • Harvey Centre	1,500
University of New Brunswick	Reds	Fredericton	NB	1785	Aitken University Centre	3,374

=== Canada West Universities Athletic Association ===
University	Varsity Name	City	Province	School Founded	Arena	Arena Capacity
University of Alberta	Pandas	Edmonton	AB	1908	Clare Drake Arena	3,000
University of British Columbia	Thunderbirds	Vancouver	BC	1906	Doug Mitchell Thunderbird Sports Centre	5,054
University of Calgary	Dinos	Calgary	AB	1966	Father David Bauer Olympic Arena	1,750
MacEwan University	Griffins	Edmonton	AB	1971	Downtown Community Arena	1,000
University of Manitoba	Bisons	Winnipeg	MB	1877	Max Bell Centre	2,121
Mount Royal University	Cougars	Calgary	AB	1931	Flames Community Arenas	500
University of Regina	Cougars	Regina	SK	1974	The Co-Operators Centre	1,300
University of Saskatchewan	Huskies	Saskatoon	SK	1907	Merlis Belsher Place	2,300
Trinity Western University	Spartans	Langley	BC	1962	Langley Events Centre	5,300

=== Ontario University Athletics ===
University	Varsity Name	City	Province	School Founded	Arena	Arena Capacity
**West Division**
Brock University	Badgers	St. Catharines	ON	1964	Seymour-Hannah Sports & Entertainment Centre	1,400
University of Guelph	Gryphons	Guelph	ON	1964	Gryphon Centre Arena	1,400
University of Waterloo	Warriors	Waterloo	ON	1957	Columbia Ice Field	680
University of Western Ontario	Mustangs	London	ON	1878	Thompson Arena	
Wilfrid Laurier University	Golden Hawks	Waterloo	ON	1957	Waterloo Recreation Complex	3,400
University of Windsor	Lancers	Windsor	ON	1857	South Windsor Arena	1,000
**East Division**
Nipissing University	Lakers	North Bay	ON	1992	North Bay Memorial Gardens	4,246
Ontario Tech University	Ridgebacks	Oshawa	ON	2002	Campus Ice Centre	800
Queen's University	Gaels	Kingston	ON	1841	Kingston Memorial Centre	3,300
Toronto Metropolitan University	Bold	Toronto	ON	1948	Mattamy Athletic Centre at the Gardens	2,796
University of Toronto	Varsity Blues	Toronto	ON	1827	Varsity Arena	4,100
York University	Lions	Toronto	ON	1959	Canlan Ice Sports – York	1,200
University of Ottawa	Gee-Gees	Ottawa	ON	1894	Sport Complex Arena	850
Carleton University	Ravens	Ottawa	ON	1952	Ice House	500

=== Réseau du sport étudiant du Québec ===
University	Varsity Name	City	Province	School Founded	Arena	Arena Capacity
Bishop's University	Gaiters	Sherbrooke	QC	1843	Jane & Eric Molson Arena	800
Concordia University	Stingers	Montreal	QC	1896	Ed Meagher Arena	
McGill University	Martlets	Montreal	QC	1821	McConnell Arena	1,500
Université de Montréal	Carabins	Montreal	QC	1821	CEPSUM	2,461

== National Champions ==
The U Sports women's ice hockey championship is awarded annually to Canada's women's ice hockey champions at the university level. The championship has been competed for since 1998, when the sport was established in the league. Previously, the most important Canadian university women's ice hockey championship was the one from the Women's Intercollegiate Athletic Union (WIAU) (from 1921 till 1971), along with that of the Ontario Women's Interuniversity Athletic Association (OWIAA) (from 1972 till 1997) which awarded the Dr. Judy McCaw trophy to the team champion.

The governing body was known as the Canadian Interuniversity Athletics Union (CIAU) when women's hockey was added to its championship roster. The body's name changed to Canadian Interuniversity Sport (CIS) in 2001 and the current U Sports in 2016.

== Awards and honours ==
=== U Sports championship MVP ===
1997-98 Corinne Swirsky, Concordia Stingers
1998-99 Lori Shupak, Alberta Pandas
1999-00 Kim St-Pierre, McGill Martlets
2000-01 Jen Rawson, Toronto Lady Blues
2001-02 Danielle Bourgeois, Alberta Pandas
2002-03 Lori Shupak, Alberta Pandas
2003-04 Danielle Bourgeois, Alberta Pandas
2004-05 Ashley Stephenson, Wilfrid Laurier Golden Hawks
2005-06 Tarin Podloski, Alberta Pandas
2006-07 Lindsay McAlpine, Alberta Pandas
2007-08 Cathy Chartrand, McGill Martlets
2008-09 Catherine Ward, McGill Martlets
2009-10 Stephanie Ramsay, Alberta Pandas
2010-11 Jordanna Peroff, McGill Martlets
2011-12 Amanda Tapp, Calgary Dinos
2014-15 Kelly Campbell, Western Mustangs
2015-16 Marie-Pier Chabot, Montreal Carabins
2016-17 Lindsey Post, Alberta Pandas
2017-18 Lauryn Keen, Manitoba Bisons
2018-19 Jade Downie-Landry, McGill Martlets
2019-20 None (Tournament cancelled due to the COVID-19 pandemic)
2020-21 None (Tournament cancelled due to the COVID-19 pandemic)
2021-22 Stéphanie Lalancette, Concordia Stingers
2022-23 Kaitlyn Ross, Mount Royal Cougars
2023-24 Jessymaude Drapeau, Concordia Stingers
2024-25 Gabrielle Santerre, Bishop's Gaiters

=== Player of the year (Brodrick Trophy) ===
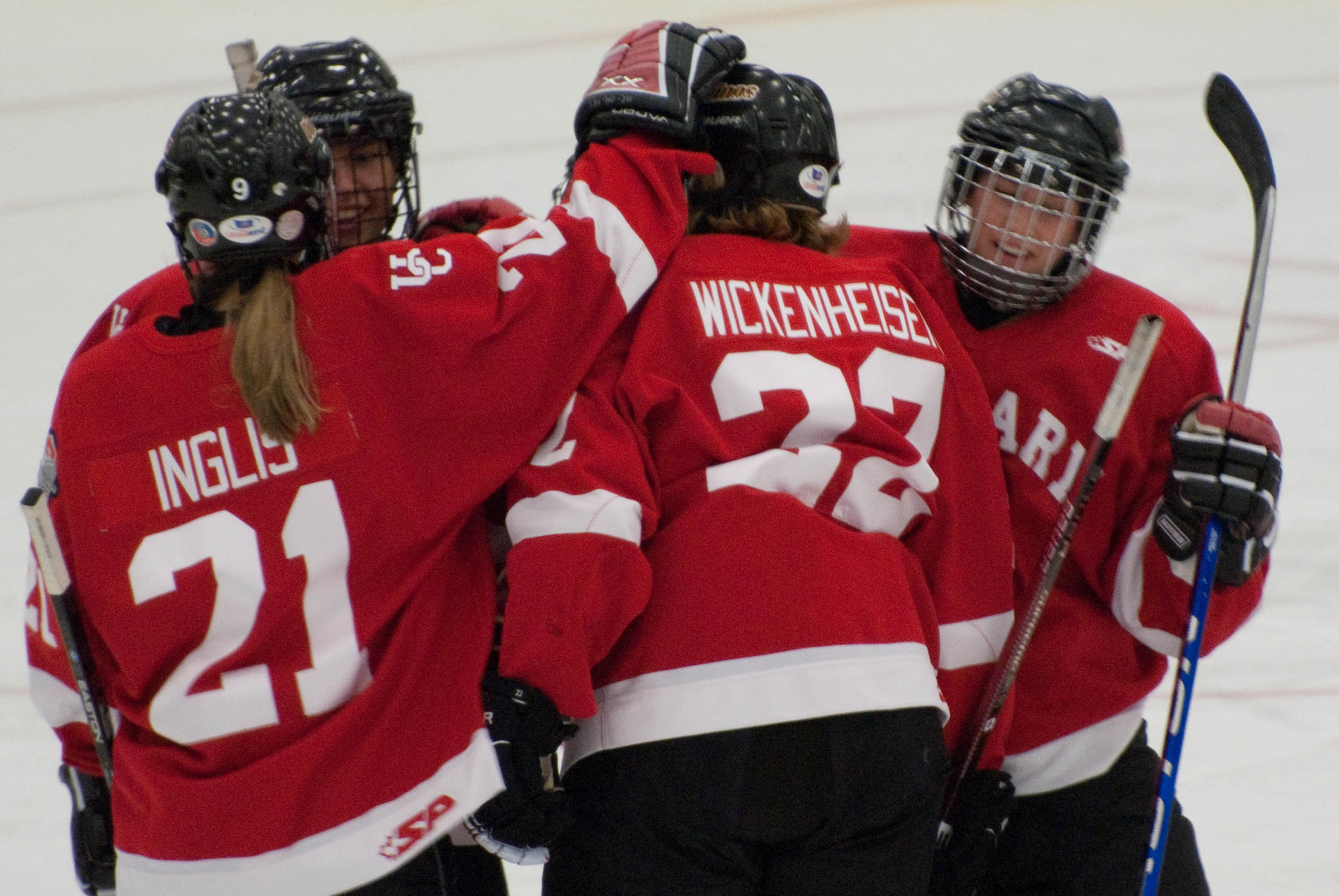
October 8th 2010 : Hayley Wickenheiser celebrating her first CIS goal with the Calgary Dinos

1997-98 Corinne Swirsky, Concordia Stingers
1998-99 Corinne Swirsky, Concordia Stingers
1999-2000 Corinne Swirsky, Concordia Stingers
2000-01 Brandy West, Regina Cougars
2001-02 Lori Shupak, Alberta Pandas
2002-03 Kim St-Pierre, McGill Martlets
2003-04 Danielle Bourgeois, Alberta Pandas
2004-05 Danielle Bourgeois, Alberta Pandas
2005-06 Kate Allgood, Brock Badgers
2006-07 Lindsay McAlpine, Alberta Pandas
2007-08 Brayden Ferguson, St. Francis Xavier X-Women
2008-09 Tarin Podloski, Alberta Pandas
2009-10 Liz Knox, Wilfrid Laurier Golden Hawks
2010-11 Hayley Wickenheiser, Calgary Dinos
2011-12 Ann-Sophie Bettez, McGill Martlets
2012-13 Melodie Daoust, McGill Martlets
2013-14 Katia Clement-Hydra, McGill Martlets
2014-15 Iya Gavrilova, Calgary Dinos
2015-16 Valerie Lamenta, Guelph Gryphons
2016-17 Sarah Bujold, St. Francis Xavier X-Women
2017-18 Daley Oddy, St. Francis Xavier X-Women
2018-19 Alex Poznikoff, Alberta Pandas
2019-20 Tyra Meropoulis, St. Francis Xavier X-Women
2020-21 None (Season cancelled due to the COVID-19 pandemic)
2021-22 Jade Downie-Landry, McGill Martlets
2022-23 Kendra Woodland, New Brunswick Reds
2023-24 Gabrielle Santerre, Bishop's Gaiters
2024-25 Grace Elliott, UBC Thunderbirds
2025-26 Jessymaude Drapeau, Concordia Stingers

=== Rookie of the year ===
1999-00 Danielle Bourgeois, Alberta Pandas
2000-01 Erin Tady, Regina Cougars
2001-02 Cindy Eadie, Wilfrid Laurier Golden Hawks
2002-03 Lindsay Taylor, Saint Mary's Huskies
2003-04 Cecilia Anderson, Concordia Stingers
2004-05 Courtney Schriver, Saint Mary's Huskies
2005-06 Karissa Swan, Regina Cougars
2006-07 Catherine Ward, McGill Martlets
2007-08 Ann-Sophie Bettez, McGill Martlets
2008-09 Marie-Andrée Leclerc-Auger, McGill Martlets
2009-10 Caitlin MacDonald, Manitoba Bisons
2010-11 Alex Normore, St. Francis Xavier X-Women
2011-12 Mélodie Daoust, McGill Martlets
2012-13 Christine Grant, Guelph Gryphons
2013-14 Kaitlin Willoughby, Saskatchewan Huskies
2014-15 Alanna Sharman, Manitoba Bisons
2015-16 Mélodie Bouchard, Ottawa Gee-Gees
2016-17 Tricia Deguire, McGill Martlets
2017-18 Maria Dominico, Nipissing Lakers
2018-19 Erika Crouse, Ryerson Rams
2019-20 Madison Willan, Alberta Pandas
2020-21 None (Season cancelled due to the COVID-19 pandemic)
2021-22 Abby Lewis, St. Francis Xavier X-Women
2022-23 Sydney Mercier, Calgary Dinos
2023-24 Gabrielle Santerre, Bishop's Gaiters
2024-25 Daphne Boutin, Bishop's Gaiters

=== Outstanding student-athlete ===
Marion Hillard Award

The award honours Marion Hillard, a top player on the University of Toronto Varsity Blues outstanding hockey team which captured six championships from 1922-27. Hillard was President of the University Hockey Club and was a member of the women's Athletic Directorate for four years. The award recognizes excellence in a student-athlete in three areas: hockey, academics and community involvement.

1997-98 Karen Kendall, Concordia Stingers
1998-99 Bridget Bates, Toronto Lady Blues
1999-00 Karina Verdon, Ottawa Gee-Gees
2000-01 Virginie Bilodeau, Patriotes de UQTR
2001-02 Lauren Houghton, Concordia Stingers
2002-03 Jenny McRae, Toronto Lady Blues
2003-04 Janna Gillis, Concordia Stingers
2004-05 Sue McCutcheon, Toronto Lady blues
2005-06 Leah Kutcher, Dalhousie Tigers
2006-07 Taryn Barry, Alberta Pandas
2007-08 Shauna Denis, McGill Martlets
2008-09 Danika Smith, Ottawa Gee-Gees
2009-10 Kaitlyn McNutt, Dalhousie Tigers
2010-11 Andrea Switalski, Mount Allison Mounties
2011-12 Jill Morillo, UOIT Ridgebacks
2012-13 Kayla Blackmore, St. Thomas Tommies
2013-14 Nicole Kesteris, Toronto Varsity Blues
2014-15 Nicole Kesteris, Toronto Varsity Blues
2015-16 Janelle Froehler, Alberta Pandas
2016-17 Sarah Weninger, Mount Royal Cougars
2017-18 Ailish Forfar, Ryerson Rams
2018-19 Jenna Gray, York Lions
2019-20 Emilia Cotter, McGill Martlets
2020-21 None (Season cancelled due to the COVID-19 pandemic)
2021-22 Jana Headrick, New Brunswick Reds
2022-23 Eve Leblanc, St. Mary's Huskies
2023-24 Emmy Fecteau, Concordia Stingers
2024-25 Elise Hugens, UBC Thunderbirds

=== Coach of the year ===
1999-00 Les Lawton, Concordia Stingers
2000-01 Karen Hughes, Toronto Lady Blues
2001-02 Howie Draper, Alberta Pandas
2002-03 Peter Smith, McGill Martlets and Lisa MacDonald, Saint Mary's Huskies
2003-04 Howie Draper, Alberta Pandas
2004-05 Todd Erskine, Brock Badgers
2005-06 Lesley Jordan, Dalhousie Tigers
2006-07 Rhéal Bordage, Moncton Aigles Bleus
2007-08 Peter Smith, McGill Martlets
2008-09 Howie Draper, Alberta Pandas
2009-10 Steve Kook, Saskatchewan Huskies
2010-11 Jim Denham, Brock Badgers
2011-12 Peter Smith, McGill Martlets
2012-13 Graham Thomas, UBC Thunderbirds
2013-14 Steve Kook, Saskatchewan Huskies
2014-15 Chris Higgins and Dave Barrett, Western Mustangs
2015-16 Chris Larade, Saint Mary’s Huskies
2016-17 Chris Larade, Saint Mary’s Huskies
2017-18 Jon Rempel, Manitoba Bisons
2018-19 Howie Draper, Alberta Pandas
2019-20 Vicky Sunohara, Toronto Varsity Blues
2020-21 None (Season cancelled due to the COVID-19 pandemic)
2021-22 Vicky Sunohara, Toronto Varsity Blues
2022-23 Vicky Sunohara, Toronto Varsity Blues
2023-24 Julie Chu, Concordia Stringers
2024-25 Julie Chu, Concordia Stringers

== All Star Teams ==
=== 1998-99 ===
G: Lesley Jordan, Saint Mary's Huskies
G: Shelly Campbell, Windsor Lancers de
D: Alana Mullins, Acadia Axewomen
D: Delaney Collins, Concordia Stingers
D: Ali MacMillan, Toronto Varsity Blues
D: Colleen Sostorics, Calgary Dinos
F: Corinne Swirsky, Concordia Stringers
F: Kelly Bechard, Calgary Dinos
F: Tasha Noble, Saint Mary's Huskies
F : Coley Dosser, Guelph Gryphons
F: Anne Rodrigue, Concordia Stingers
F: Sue Ann Van Damme, Toronto Varsity Blues

=== 1999-2000 ===
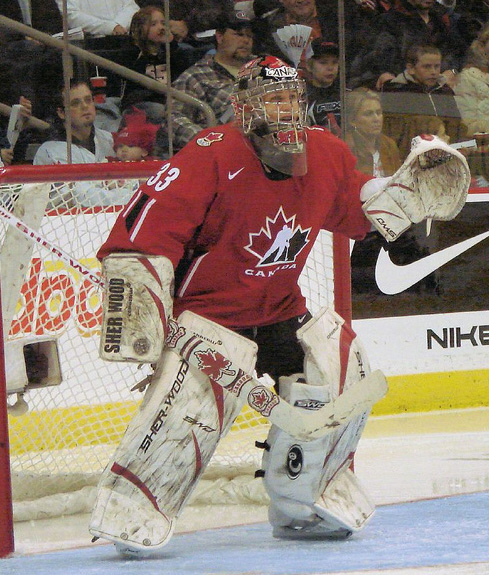
Kim St-Pierre was elected to CIS All-Star teams four times.

G: Kim St-Pierre, McGill Martlets
G: Robyn Rittmaster, Calgary Dinos
D: Genevieve Fagnan, Concordia Stingers
D: Sandra Hustler, Windsor Lancers
D: Leanne MacDonald, St. Francis Xavier X-Women
D: Colleen Sostorics, Calgary Dinos
F: Lisa Backman, Wilfrid Laurier Golden Hawks
F: Urszula May, Toronto Varsity Blues
F: Lori Shupak, Alberta Pandas
F: Caroline Proulx, Patriotes de UQTR
F: Corinne Swirsky, Concordia Stingers
F: Brandy West, Regina Cougars

Playoffs All Stars

CIS championship MVP player: Lori Shupak, Alberta Pandas

G: Keely Brown, Toronto Varsity Blues
D: Geneviève Fagnan, Concordia Stingers
D: Leanne MacDonald, St. Francis Xavier X-Women
F: Julie Hornsby, McGill Martlets
F: Anne Rodrigue, Concordia Stingers
F: Krysty Lorenz, Alberta Pandas

=== 2000-01 ===
G: Kim St-Pierre, McGill Martlets
G: Stacey McCullough, Alberta Pandas
D: Heather Vance, Toronto Varsity Blues
D: Virginie Bilodeau, Patriotes de UQTR
D: Carol Scheibel, Calgary Dinos
F: Jen Rawson, Toronto Varsity Blues
F: Guylaine Haché, Moncton Anges Bleus
F: Brandy West, Regina Cougars
F: Corinne Swirsky, Concordia Stingers
F: Lisa Backman, Wilfrid Laurier Golden Hawks
F: Danielle Bourgeois, Alberta Pandas

=== 2001-02 ===
G: Kim St-Pierre, McGill Martlets
G : Alison Houston, Toronto Lady Blues
D: Leanne MacDonald, St. Francis Xavier X-Women
D: Virginie Bilodeau, Patriotes de UQTR
D: Susie Laska, Lady Blues de Toronto
D: Joell Fidler, Regina Cougars
F: Brandy West, Regina Cougars
F: Lisa Backman, Wilfrid Laurier Golden Hawks
F: Lisa-Marie Breton, Concordia Stingers
F: Tasha Noble, Saint Mary's Huskies
F: Jen Rawson, Toronto Lady Blues
F: Krysty Lorenz, Alberta Pandas

=== 2002-03 ===
G: Cindy Eadie, Wilfrid Laurier Golden Hawks
G: Stacey McCullough, Alberta Pandas
D: Judy Diduck, Alberta Pandas
D: Suzanne Kaye, Concordia Stingers
D: Alison Goodman, Wilfrid Laurier Golden Hawks
D: Melanie Roach, York Lions
F : Lori Shupak, Alberta Pandas
F: Marie-Claude Allard, Concordia Stingers
F: Kerri-Ann Rudaniecki, Guelph Gryphons
F: Danielle Bourgeois, Alberta Pandas
F: Sophie Acheson, McGill Martlets
F: Tasha Noble, Saint Mary's Huskies

=== 2003-04 ===
In 2003, U Sports, then known as Canadian Interuniversity Sport (CIS), added an All-Stars category for the playoffs.

Regular season
G: Kim St-Pierre, McGill Martlets
G: Alison Houston, Toronto Lady Blues
D: Sue Kaye, Concordia Stingers
D: Alison Goodman, Wilfrid Laurier Golden Hawks
D: Judy Diduck, Alberta Pandas
D: Kim Malcher, Toronto Lady Blues
F: Marie-Claude Allard, Concordia Stingers
F: Danielle Bourgeois, Alberta Pandas
F: Karrie Boyle, Saint Mary’s Huskies
F: Elizabeth Chiasson, Queen’s Golden Gaels
F: Krissy Thompson, Wilfrid Laurier Golden Hawks
F: Lori Shupak, Alberta Pandas

Playoff All-Star selections
G: Alison Houston, Toronto Lady Blues
D: Michelle Koester, Lethbridge Horns
D: Carol Scheibel, Alberta Pandas
D: Susie Laska, Toronto Lady Blues
F: Lori Shupak, Alberta Pandas
F: Danielle Bourgeois, Alberta Pandas

=== 2004-05 ===
In 2004, the then-CIS began selecting two All-Star teams (first All-Stars and now second All-Stars) and an All-Rookie Team, as well as maintaining the selection of All-Stars Team for the playoffs tournament.

First All-Stars Team
G: Cecilia Anderson, Concordia Stingers
D: Judy Diduck, Alberta Pandas
D: Alison Goodman, Wilfrid Laurier Golden Hawks
F: Elizabeth Chiasson, Queen's Golden Gaels
F: Danielle Bourgeois, Alberta Pandas
F: Delaney Collins, Alberta Pandas

Second All-Stars Team
G: Lucie Fortin, UBC Thunderbirds
D: Joell Fiddler, Regina Cougars
D: Safiya Muharuma, Toronto Lady Blues
F: Véronique Lapierre, McGill Martlets
F: Lindsay Taylor, Saint Mary's Huskies
F: Dominique Rancour, Concordia Stingers

All-Rookie Team
G: Cecilia Anderson, Concordia Stingers
D: Katie Barrett, St. Francis Xavier X-Women
F: Rebecca Davies, St. Francis Xavier X-Women

Playoffs All Stars
G: Megan Takeda, Ottawa Gee-Gees
D: Judy Diduck, Alberta Pandas
D: Ashley Stephenson, Wilfrid Laurier Golden Hawks
F: Véronique Lapierre, McGill Martlets
F: Lindsay Taylor, Saint Mary's Huskies
F: Danielle Bourgeois, Alberta Pandas

=== 2005-06 ===
First All-Stars Team
G: Cindy Eadie, Wilfrid Laurier Golden Hawks
D: Delaney Collins-Pye, Alberta Pandas
D: Roxanne Dupuis, Concordia Stingers
F: Danielle Bourgeois, Alberta Pandas d
F: Élizabeth Chiasson, Queen's Golden Gaels
F: Lindsay Taylor, Saint Mary's Huskies

Second All-Stars Team
G: Cecilia Anderson, Concordia Stingers
D: Ashley Stephenson, Wilfrid Laurier Golden Hawks
D: Jacqueline Stroeve, Lethbridge Horns
F: Kate Allgood, Brock Badgers
F: Dominique Rancour, Concordia Stingers
F: Kimberly Kerr, Ottawa Gee-Gees

All-Rookie Team
G: Catherine Herron, McGill Martlets
D: Sandy Roy, Concordia Stingers
D: Andrea Bevan, Wilfrid Laurier Golden Hawks
F: Tarin Podloski, Alberta Pandas
F: Elaine Dumas, Guelph Gryphons
F: Courtney Schriver, Saint Mary's Huskies

Playoff All-Star selections
CIS championship MVP player: Ashley Stephenson, Wilfrid Laurier Golden Hawks
G: Cindy Eadie, Wilfrid Laurier Golden Hawks
D: Ashley Stephenson, Wilfrid Laurier Golden Hawks
D: Delaney Collins-Pye, Alberta Pandas
F: Danielle Bourgeois, Alberta Pandas
F: Laurissa Kenworthy, Wilfrid Laurier Golden Hawks
F: Valérie Paquette, McGill Martlets

=== 2006-07 ===
First All-Stars Team
G: Melanie Quinn, York Lions
D: Ashley Stephenson, Wilfrid Laurier Golden Hawks
D: Haleigh Callison, UBC Thunderbirds
F: Courtney Schriver, Saint Mary’s Huskies
F: Kate Allgood, Brock Badgers
F: Kristen Hagg, Alberta Pandas

Second All-Stars Team
G: Emily Hobbs, Saint-Thomas Tommies
D: Kim Devereaux, Toronto Lady Blues
D: Arielle Schade, Regina Cougars
F: Tarin Podloski, Alberta Pandas
F: Kim Kerr, Ottawa Gee-Gees
F: Rebecca Davies, St. Francis Xavier X-Women

All-Rookie Team
G: Terri Ryerson, UBC Thunderbirds
D: Laura Grant, St. Francis Xavier X-Women
F: Karissa Swan, Regina Cougars

Playoff All-Stars
CIS championship MVP award: Lindsay McAlpine, Alberta Pandas
Sportsmanship Award: Liane Kisil, Manitoba Bisons
G: Holly Tarleton, Alberta Pandas
D: Rayanne Reeve, Alberta Pandas
D: Catherine Ward, McGill Martlets
F: Tarin Podloski, Alberta Pandas
F: Lindsay McAlpine, Alberta Pandas
F: Laurissa Kenworthy, Wilfrid Laurier Golden Hawks

=== 2007-08 ===
First All-Star team
G: Charline Labonté, McGill Martlets
D: Andrea Bevan, Wilfrid Laurier Golden Hawks
D: Catherine Ward, McGill Martlets
F : Lindsay McAlpine, Alberta Pandas
F: Mariève Provost, Moncton Aigles Bleus
F: Vanessa Davidson, McGill Martlets

Second All-Star Team
G: Stephanie Lockert, Toronto Lady Blues
D: Marilynn Hay, Wilfrid Laurier Golden Hawks
D: Rayanne Reeve, Alberta Pandas
F: Kate Allgood, Brock Badgers
F: Tarin Podloski, Alberta Pandas
F: Christine Hartnoll, McGill Martlets

All-Rookie Team
G: Melinda Choy, UBC Thunderbirds
D: Catherine Ward, McGill Martlets
F: Mariève Provost, Moncton Aigles Bleus

Playoff All-Star selections
CIS championship MVP award: Lindsay McAlpine, Alberta Pandas
Sportsmanship Award: Liane Kisil, Manitoba Bisons
G: Holly Tarleton, Alberta Pandas
D: Rayanne Reeve, Alberta Pandas
D: Catherine Ward, McGill Martlets
F: Tarin Podloski, Alberta Pandas
F: Lindsay McAlpine, Alberta Pandas
F: Laurissa Kenworthy, Wilfrid Laurier Golden Hawks

=== 2008-09 ===
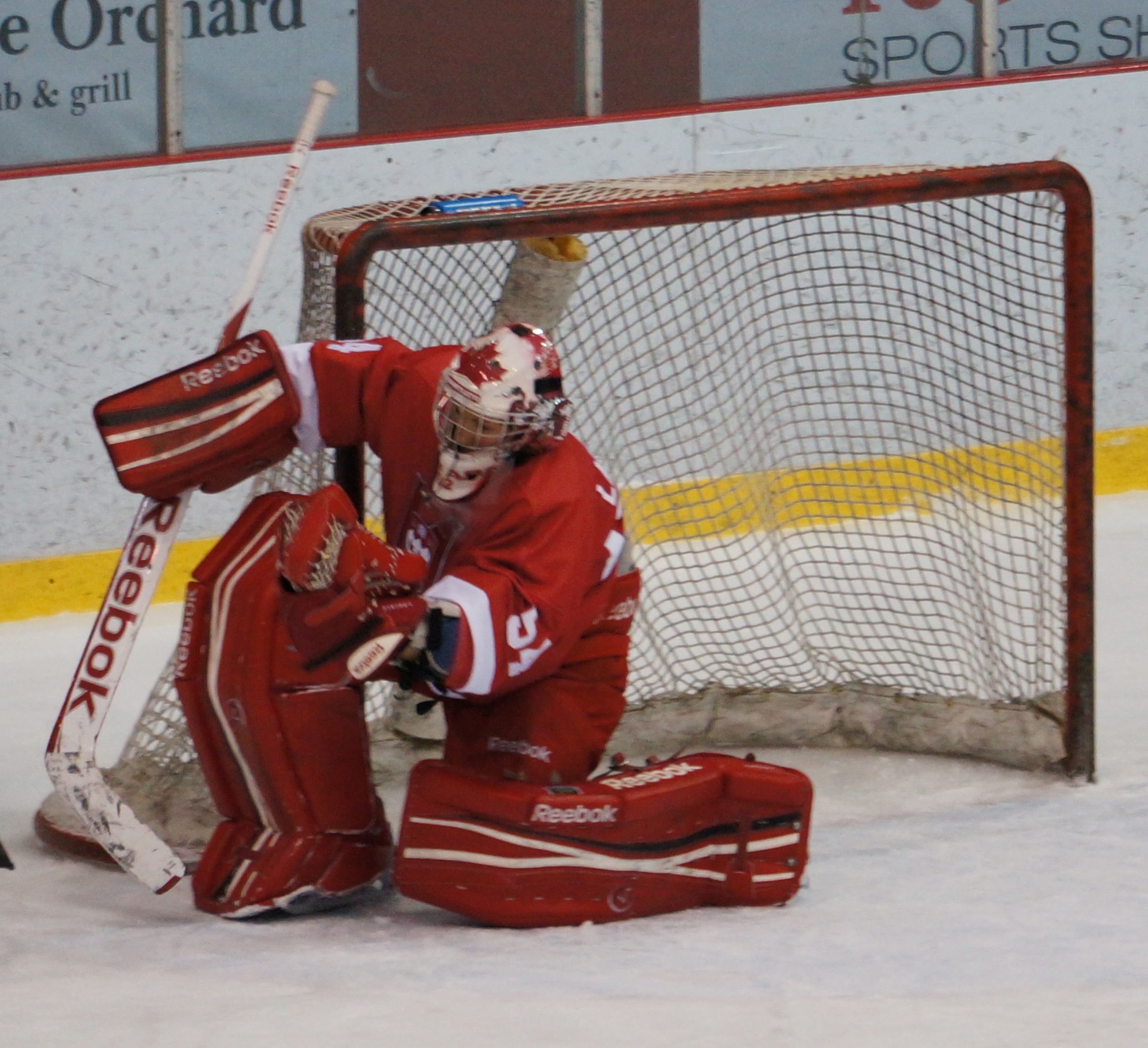
Charline Labonté also played for Canada women's national ice hockey team.

First All-Star Team
G: Charline Labonté, McGill Martlets
D: Andrea Bevan, Wilfrid Laurier Golden Hawks
D: Catherine Ward, McGill Martlets
F: Brayden Ferguson, St. Francis Xavier X-Women
F: Jennifer Newton, Alberta Pandas
F: Vanessa Davidson, McGill Martlets

Second All-Star team
G: Stéphanie Lockert, Toronto Lady Blues
D: Marilynn Hay, St. Francis Xavier X-Women
D: Kerri Palmer, Carleton Ravens
F: Ann-Sophie Bettez, McGill Martlets
F: Janine Davies, Toronto Lady Blues
F: Lauren Barch, Wilfrid Laurier Golden Hawks

All-Rookie Team
G: Kathy Desjardins, Moncton Aigles Bleus
D: Kerri Palmer, Carleton Ravens
D: Andrea Boras, Alberta Pandas
F: Ann-Sophie Bettez, McGill Martlets
F: Addie Miles, Manitoba Bisons
F: Jocelyn LeBlanc, Dalhousie Tigers

Playoff All-Stars
CIS championship MVP award: Cathy Chartrand, McGill Martlets
Sportsmanship Award: Suzanne Fenerty, St. Francis Xavier X-Women
G: Liz Knox, Wilfrid Laurier Golden Hawks
D: Cathy Chartrand, McGill Martlets
D: Catherine Ward, McGill Martlets
F: Vanessa Davidson, McGill Martlets
F: Andrea Ironside, Wilfrid Laurier Golden Hawks
F: Lauren Meschino, Wilfrid Laurier Golden Hawks

=== 2009-10 ===
First All-Star Team
G: Charline Labonté, McGill Martlets
D: Catherine Ward, McGill Martlets
D: Andrea Bevan, Wilfrid Laurier Golden Hawks
F: Tarin Podloski, Alberta Pandas
F: Ann-Sophie Bettez, McGill Martlets
F: Mariève Provost, Moncton Aigles bleus

Second All-Star Team
G: Stacey Corfield, Manitoba Bisons
D: Cathy Chartrand, McGill Martlets
D: Stephanie Ramsay, Alberta Bisons
F: Vanessa Davidson, McGill Martlets
F: Andrea Ironside, Wilfrid Laurier Golden Hawks
F: Alana Cabana, Alberta Pandas

All-Rookie Team
G: Kendyl Valenta, Toronto Lady Blues
D: Stephanie Ramsay, Alberta Pandas
D: Julia Endicott, Waterloo Warriors
F: Marie-Andrée Leclerc-Auger, McGill Martlets
F: Tamara Bell, Guelph Gryphons
F: Janelle Parent, IPE Panthers

Playoff All-Star selections
CIS championship MVP award: Catherine Ward, McGill Martlets
Sportsmanship Award: Suzanne Fenerty, St. Francis Xavier X-Women
G: Charline Labonté, McGill Martlets
D: Cathy Chartrand, McGill Martlets
D: Catherine Ward, McGill Martlets
F: Mariève Provost, Moncton Aigles Bleus
F: Ann-Sophie Bettez, McGill Martlets
F: Andrea Ironside, Wilfrid Laurier Golden Hawks

=== 2010-11 ===
First All-Star Team
G: Charline Labonté, McGill Martlets
D: Cathy Chartrand, McGill Martlets
D: Suzanne Fenerty, St. Francis Xavier X-Women
F: Hayley Wickenheiser, Calgary Dinos
F: Mariève Provost, Moncton Aigles Bleus
F: Kelly Walker, Brock Badgers

Second All-Star team
G: Beth Clause, Brock Badgers
D: Gillian Ferrari, McGill Martlets
D: Laura Shearer, Dalhousie Tigers
F: Ann-Sophie Bettez, McGill Martlets
F: Alex Normore, St. Francis Xavier X-Women
F: Breanne George, Saskatchewan Huskies

All-Rookie Team
G: Nicole Kesteris, Toronto Lady Blues
D: Alannah Wakefield, Wilfrid Laurier Golden Hawks
D: Jenna Pitts, St. Francis Xavier X-Women
F: Alex Normore, St. Francis Xavier X-Women
F: Katia Clément-Heydra, McGill Martlets
F: Laura Brooker, Wilfrid Laurier Golden Hawks

Playoff All-Star selections
CIS championship MVP award:Jordanna Peroff, McGill Martlets
Sportsmanship : Nicole Pratt, Alberta Pandas
G: Mel Dodd-Moher, Queen’s Golden Gaels
D: Cathy Chartrand, McGill Martlets
D: Suzanne Fenerty, St. Francis Xavier X-Women
F: Carolyn Campbell, St. Francis Xavier X-Women
F: Jordanna Peroff, McGill Martlets
F: Leslie Oles, McGill Martlets

=== 2011-12 ===
First All-Star Team
G: Charline Labonté, McGill Martlets
D: Cathy Chartrand, McGill Martlets
D: Suzanne Fenerty, St. Francis Xavier X-Women
F: Ann-Sophie Bettez, McGill Martlets
F: Alex Normore, St. Francis Xavier X-Women
F: Julie Paetsch, Saskatchewan Huskies

Second All-Star team
G: Rebecca Bouwhuis, Waterloo Warriors
D: Stephanie Ramsay, Calgary Dinos
D: Jacalyn Sollis, Guelph Gryphons
F: Hayley Wickenheiser, Calgary Dinos
F: Mélodie Daoust, McGill Martlets
F: Jill Morillo UOIT Ridgebacks

All-Rookie Team
G: Rebecca Bouwhuis, Waterloo Warriors
D: Valérie Watson, Ottawa Gee-Gees
D: Kristen Barbara, York Lions
F: Mélodie Daoust, McGill Martlets
F: Marie-Pier Arsenault, Moncton Aigles Bleu
F: Sadie Lenstra, Lethbridge Pronghorns

Playoff All-Star selections
CIS championship MVP award: Amanda Tapp, Calgary Dinos
Sportsmanship : Andrea Boras, Alberta Pandas
G: Amanda Tapp, Calgary Dinos
D: Stephanie Ramsay, Calgary Dinos
D: Élizabeth Mantha, Montréal Carabins
F: Kim Deschênes, Montréal Carabins
F: Leslie Oles, McGill Martlets
F: Hayley Wickenheiser, Calgary Dinos

=== Previous Championship tournaments ===
- 2011 CIS women's ice hockey Championship
- 2010 CIS women's ice hockey Championship
- 2009 CIS women's ice hockey Championship
- 2008 CIS women's ice hockey Championship
- 2007 CIS women's ice hockey Championship
- 2006 CIS women's ice hockey Championship
- 2005 CIS women's ice hockey Championship
- 2004 CIS women's ice hockey Championship
- 2003 CIS women's ice hockey Championship
