= Queen's Gaels women's ice hockey =

Representative program of Queen's University at Kingston in Ontario, Canada

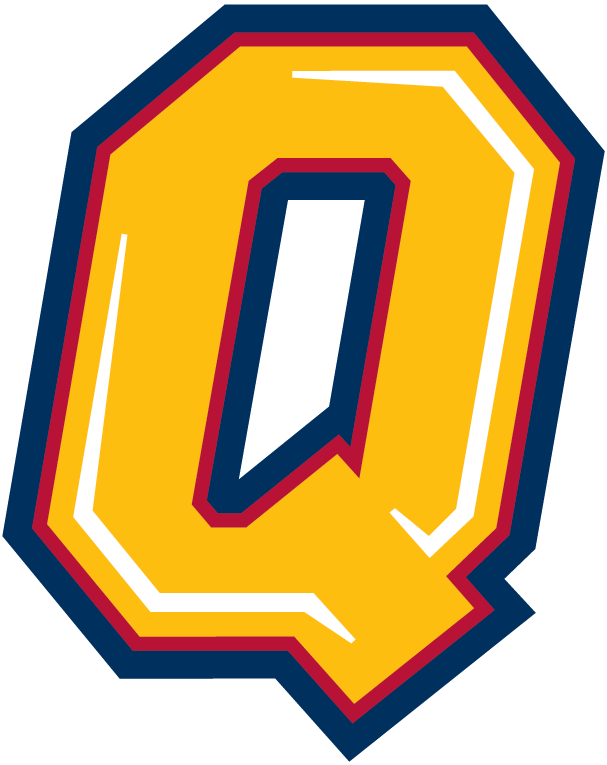
- University: Queen's University at Kingston
- Conference: Ontario University Athletics; East Division
- Head coach: Matt Holmberg; 13 season, 163–62–27
- Assistant coaches: Russ Holmberg; Morgan McHaffie; Mike Murphy
- Arena: Kingston Memorial Centre; Kingston, Ontario
- Colors: Gold, Blue, and Red

Conference tournament champions
- 2011, 2013

Queen's Gaels women's ice hockey is the representative women's ice hockey program of Queen's University at Kingston in Kingston, Ontario, Canada. The team plays in the women's ice hockey section of Ontario University Athletics (OUA), one of the four regional governing bodies that comprise U Sports.

The first records of organized women's ice hockey in Canada date back to university level games played in the 1890s. Queen's University at Kingston and the University of Toronto were two of the first Canadian universities to field women's ice hockey teams.

== History ==
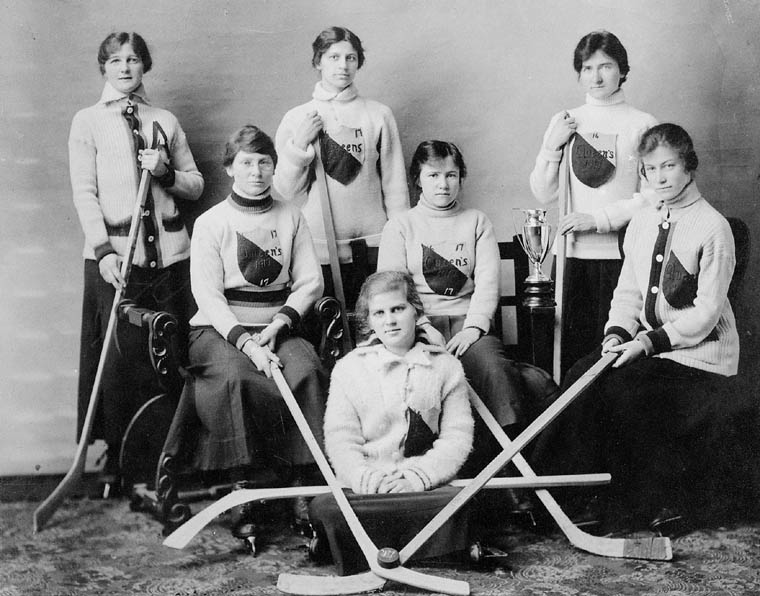
Queen's team of 1917

Elizabeth Graham would play hockey for Queen's University and is credited as the first goaltender ever to wear a mask for protection. She used the mask in 1927, and her use of the mask was noted in the Montreal Daily Star. The mask she donned was actually a fencing mask and there was speculation that she opted to use the mask as a means of protecting recently-performed dental work.

During the 1960s, a group of dedicated students led by Cookie Cartwright revived the women's ice hockey program at Queen's University. Cartwright and the Golden Gaels would go on to capture the first women's university championship. Known originally as the Golden Gals, the program captured the OWIAA title in the 1974–75 season.

After 32 long years, the Queen's women's hockey team captured their first OUA Championship in 2010–11. The team won all five of their playoff games in overtime, knocking off nationally ranked opponents Windsor in the Quarter-final, Wilfrid Laurier in the Semifinal and Guelph in the Final. Game 1 of the OUA Championship series was historic in its own right for the Gaels as the team won the longest collegiate hockey game in history, a six-overtime marathon. The game finally game to an end after 107 minutes and 14 seconds of overtime when Morgan McHaffie banged home a rebound past Guelph goaltender Danielle Skoufranis. Queen's goaltender Melanie "Mel" Dodd-Moher made 66 saves for the win.

The team moved on to their first CIS Championship following the OUA playoffs where the Gaels defeated the defending champion Alberta Pandas and the host Wilfrid Laurier Golden Hawks to win the bronze medal.

Morgan McHaffie was recognized as the 2012 OUA women's hockey Player of the Year. She led the OUA league scoring race with 38 points (16 goals and 22 assists). She ranked fourth overall in CIS scoring. She was the first Gael to earn Player of the Year honors since the 2003–04 campaign. She was also recognized as an OUA First-Team All-Star.

Freshman Taryn Pilon was named to the 2012 OUA All-Rookie team. She appeared in every Queen's contest, while recording 21 points and taking only one penalty. Defender Katie Duncan was making her first appearances on an all-star team as she was named to the 2012 OUA Second Team All-Stars. Duncan finished the 2011–12 campaign tied for fourth among OUA defenders with 15 points. In addition, Duncan led all blueliners with six goals on the season.

=== Notable games ===
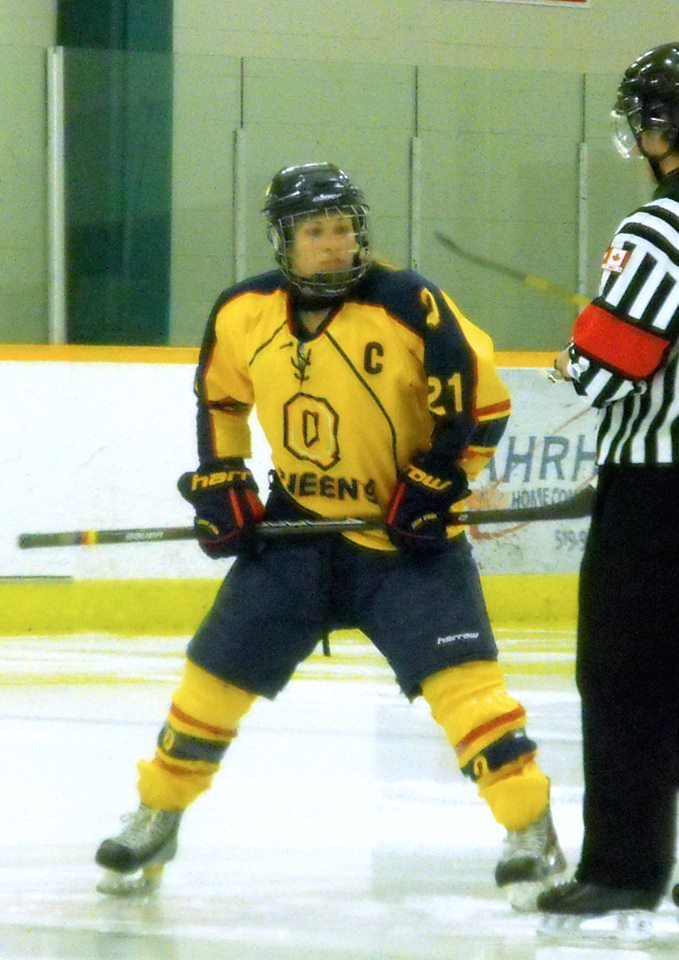
Golden Gaels player in 2014-15 season

- March 3, 2011: A postseason match between the Queen's Golden Gaels and the Guelph Gryphons became the longest collegiate hockey game, male or female, Canadian or American — on record. The match began on Wednesday and it only ended on Thursday. The duration of the match was 167 minutes and 14 seconds when Queen's forward Morgan McHaffie placed a rebound past Gryphons goalie Danielle Skoufranis in the sixth overtime period. With the win, Mel Dodd-Moher won her fourth consecutive playoff game.

== Season-by-season results ==
Year	Wins	Losses	Ties	Coach	Farthest in Postseason
2010–11	15	8	4	Matt Holmberg	Bronze Medal, CIS Championships
2009–10	19	5	3	Matt Holmberg	Lost in OUA Playoffs

== International ==
- Morgan McHaffie Canada: 2015 Winter Universiade
- Marie-Pierre Pelissou France: Ice hockey at the 2026 Winter Olympics – Women's tournament

== Awards and honours ==
=== OUA Awards ===
- Matthew Holmberg was named the recipient of the Fox 40 Ontario University Athletics (OUA) Male Coach of the Year during the 2011 OUA Honour Awards
- Katrina Manoukarakis, 2017-18 OUA Most Valuable Player
- Katrina Manoukarakis, 2017-18 OUA Forward of the Year
- Stephanie Pascal, 2017-18 OUA Goaltender of the Year
- Charlotte Melindy, 2024-25 OUA Champion of EDI (Equity, Diversity and Inclusion) Award
- Sophie Hudson, Queen's, 2025-26 OUA East MVP
- Jada Wood, Queens, 2025-26 OUA East Rookie of the Year
- Scarlett Nowakowski, Queens, 2025-26 OUA East Defender of the Year
- Emma Tennant, Queen's, 2025-26 OUA East Goaltender of the Year
- Morgan McHaffie, Queen's, 2025-26 OUA East Coach of the Year

==== OUA All-Stars ====
- Allison Bagg, 2010 OUA First Team All-Star
- Mel Dodd-Moher, 2010 OUA All-Rookie Team
- Elizabeth Kench, 2010 OUA Second Team All-Star
- Morgan McHaffie, 2010 OUA All-Rookie Team Morgan McHaffie's selection to the 2010 OUA All-Rookie team signified the fifth time in five years that a Queens player was selected for the honour. She tied for the OUA rookie scoring lead with 24 points.
- Morgan McHaffie, 2011 OUA Second Team All-Star

=== CIS/USports Nationals ===
- Mel Dodd-Moher, 2011 CIS Tournament All-Star

==== Player of the Game ====
- Mel Dodd-Moher, Queen's player of the game: CIS Round Robin match versus Alberta Pandas (March 2011)

=== USports Awards ===
- Jada Wood, 2025-26 USPORTS Rookie of the Year Award

=== USports All-Canadians ===
- Rebecca Conroy, 2010 All-CIS Second Team selection
- Morgan McHaffie, 2012-13 USports Second Team All-Star

=== USports All-Rookies ===
- Melanie Dodd-Moher, 2010 CIS All-Rookie team
- Katrina Manoukarakis, 2015-16 U Sports Second Team All-Canadian
- Jada Wood, 2025-26 USPORTS All-Rookie Team

== See also ==
- Ontario University Athletics women's ice hockey
