= Bishop's Gaiters women's ice hockey =

Canadian university ice hockey team

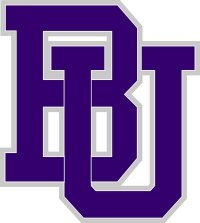
- University: Bishop's University
- Conference: RSEQ
- Governing Body: U Sports
- Head coach: Valerie Bois since 2024-25 season
- Assistant coaches: Alexandra Boulanger; Gabriel Delage; Stephane Dion
- Arena: Jane & Eric Molson Arena; Sherbrooke, Quebec
- Colors: Purple and Silver

U Sports tournament champions
- 2025

U Sports tournament appearances
- 2025

Conference tournament champions
- 2025

The Bishop's Gaiters women's ice hockey program represents Bishop's University in Sherbrooke, Quebec in the sport of ice hockey in the RSEQ conference of U Sports women's ice hockey. When the Gaiters joined the RSEQ, they became the first-Quebec based program not from the city of Montreal to compete in the conference. The Gaiters have won one national championship, winning in their first tournament appearance in 2025.

== History ==
Women’s hockey at Bishop’s dates back to 1915. In 1975 and 1976, Bishops hosted the Women's Invitational Hockey Tournament. The 1975 participants also included the Loyola Tommies, University of Toronto and Dawson College. The Loyola Tommies captured the championship, defeating Toronto in the final. The participants for the 1976 Tournament included John Abbott College, University of New Brunswick Red Blazers and Dawson College. John Abbott captured the championship, while Bishop's defeated Dawson College in double overtime for third place.

Recent history has seen the Gaiters undergo significant movement. Members of the Independent Women’s Club Hockey League (IWCHL) in 2016–17, the program would spend the 2017–18 and 2018–19 seasons competing in the American Collegiate Hockey Association (ACHA). Following their sojourn in the ACHA, the Gaiters played an independent schedule in 2019–20. In January 2020, it was announced that the Gaiters were poised to join the RSEQ for the 2020–21 season, benefitting from a lead gift from the Molson Family Foundation, including support from Molson Coors and the Bishop's University Foundation and other donors. The Gaiters home arena was renamed the Jane and Eric Molson Arena. Due to the COVID-19 Pandemic, the 2020–21 season was cancelled.

Gaiters assistant coaches Val Bois and Katia Clement-Heydra formed the Women's Hockey Institute in December 2020, a partnership with Bishop's University and Fonction Optimum, based at the Jane & Eric Molson Arena.

The Gaiters joined the RSEQ conference for the 2021–22 season, becoming the 37th U Sports-level women's hockey university team in Canada. Their first game as an official member of the RSEQ conference took place on 22 October 2021, against the Montreal Carabins women's ice hockey program.

In 2024, Gabrielle Santerre became the first player in USPORTS women's ice hockey history to win the Brodrick Trophy (awarded to the Most Outstanding Player in USPORTS) and the Rookie of the Year Award in the same year. In addition, she also captured the same honors at the conference level, earning the RSEQ MVP and RSEQ Rookie of the Year Awards, respectively. During the 2023-24 season, she left the nation in scoring with 45 points in 25 games play. Of note, she set an RSEQ Rookie record for most points in one season.

After winning the conference championship for the first time in the 2024-25 season, the Gaiters qualified for their first national tournament as the third-seeded team in the 2025 U Sports Women's Ice Hockey Championship. The Gaiters won three straight games, including the gold medal game against the host Waterloo Warriors, to earn their first U Sports women's ice hockey championship in just their fourth season of play.

=== Exhibition ===
Date	Opponent^{#}	Rank^{#}	Site	Decision	Result	Record
Exhibition
26 October 2019	Korea women's national ice hockey team		Jane & Eric Molson Arena • Sherbrooke, QC	Jade Shushu Saulnier-Cyr	W 4–0	
*Non-conference game. ^{#}Rankings from USCHO.com Poll.

== National championships ==
Year	Winner	Score	Runner-up
2025	Bishop's Gaiters	3-0	Waterloo Warriors

=== U Sports Tournament results ===
Year	Seed	Round	Opponent	Result
2025	#3	First Round; Semi-Finals; Gold Medal Game	#6 UBC #2 Toronto #8 Waterloo	W 4-3 (OT); W 2-1; W 3-0

== Awards and honours ==
- Gabrielle Santerre, RSEQ Player of the Month: November 2023
- Gabrielle Santerre, 2024 RSEQ Most Valuable Player
- Gabrielle Santerre, 2024 RSEQ Rookie of the Year Award

=== USPORTS Awards ===
- Gabrielle Santerre, 2024 Brodrick Trophy
- Gabrielle Santerre, 2024 USPORTS Rookie of the Year Award
- Gabrielle Santerre, 2024 USPORTS First Team All-Canadian
- Gabrielle Santerre, 2024 USPORTS All-Rookie
- Gabrielle Santerre, 2025 USPORTS National Championship Tournament MVP
- Ericka Gagnon, 2025 USPORTS National Championship All-Tournament Team
- Regan Garreau, 2025 USPORTS National Championship All-Tournament Team
- Gabrielle Santerre, 2025 USPORTS National Championship All-Tournament Team

=== Team awards ===
Rookie of the Year

- 2017–18: Kayla LeTouzel
- 2018–19: Miranda Snable
- 2019–20: Lory Lacombe

Charles Chapman Award

- 2017–18: Christine Gauthier
- 2018–19: Arianne Charette
- 2019–20: Pascale Desmarais

Most Improved Player

- 2017–18: Jessica Briere
- 2018–19: Meghan McGovern
- 2019–20: Lory Lacombe

Most Valuable Player

- 2017–18: Kayla LeTouzel
- 2018–19: Jess Belanger
- 2019–20: Jess Belanger

=== University Awards ===
- Hayley Robitaille – Provigo/Robert Lafond Bishop's Athletes of the Week (awarded week ending 19 November 2018)
- Danielle Armand – Provigo/Robert Lafond Bishop's Athletes of the Week (awarded week ending 27 October 2019)

== International ==
- Gabrielle Santerre, Forward, Canada: Ice hockey at the 2025 Winter World University Games (silver)
