= 2007–08 Alberta Pandas women's ice hockey season =

Canada West Conference Champions
- Conference: 1st Canada West
- Home ice: Clare Drake Arena

Record
- Overall: 21-2-1

Coaches and captains
- Head coach: Howie Draper
- Assistant coaches: Danielle Bourgeois; Judy Diduck; Dave Marcinyshyn
- Captain: Jennifer Newton
- Alternate captain(s): Alanna Donahue; Trisha McNeill; Mia Mucci

The 2007–08 Alberta Pandas women's ice hockey was the eleventh Canadian Interuniversity Sport (CIS; renamed U Sports in 2016) season completed by the program. The Pandas finished the season ranked first in the Canada West conference with 21 wins, compared to 2 losses and one overtime loss. The Pandas appeared at the 2008 CIS National Championship Tournament and ended with a fourth-place finish.

== Roster ==
Number	Name	Position	Height
1	Dana Vinge	Goaltender	5'4"
4	Kathleen Keen	Defence	5'6"
6	Katie Borbely	Forward	5'5"
7	Jessica Kolopenuk	Defence	5'10"
8	Jennifer Newton - C	Forward	5'7"
9	Patty Tulloch	Forward	5'7"
10	Nicole Pratt	Forward	5'10"
11	Andrea Boras	Defence	5'6"
12	Andrea Wiebe	Defence	5'5"
13	Mia Mucci - A	Forward	5'7"
14	Leah Copeland	Forward	5'6"
15	Lindsay Robinson	Forward	5'4"
16	Laura Salomons	Forward	5'3"
17	Lindsie Fairfield	Forward	5'7"
18	Rayanne Reeve	Defence	5'10"
19	Carolyn Bowen	Forward	6'0"
20	Alanna Donahue A	Defence	5'8"
21	Brodie MacDonald	Forward	5'7"
22	Amy Young	Forward	5'2"
23	Cami Wooster	Forward	5'3"
24	Trisha McNeill A	Defence	5'7"
27	Kailee Ryan	Defence	5'6"
33	Chantale Tippett	Goal	5'3"
44	Miranda Miller	Forward	5'6"
77	Alana Cabana	Forward	5'4"

=== Coaching staff ===
- Howie Draper, head coach
- Danielle Bourgeois, assistant coach
- Judy Diduck, assistant coach
- Dave Marcinyshyn, assistant coach
- Dave Crowder, goalie coach
- Stacey Phillips, goalie coach

== Schedule ==
Date	Opponent	Team
Sat., Sept. 22	Red Deer Queens	5-0
Fri, Oct. 05	UBC Thunderbirds	9-5
Sat, Oct. 06	UBC Thunderbirds	5-1
Fri, Oct. 12	Regina Cougars	4-2
Sat, Oct. 13	Regina Cougars	5-2
Fri, Oct. 19	Lethbridge Kodiaks	7-1
Sat, Oct. 20	Lethbridge Kodiaks	4-0
Fri, Nov. 02	Saskatchewan Huskies	9-2
Sat, Nov. 03	Saskatchewan Huskies	5-3
Fri, Nov. 09	Manitoba Bisons	2-3
Sat, Nov. 10	Manitoba Bisons	2-0
Fri, Nov. 16	UBC Thunderbirds	3-4
Sat, Nov. 17	UBC Thunderbirds	3-2 (OT)
Fri, Nov. 23	Lethbridge Kodiaks	4-0
Sat, Nov. 24	Lethbridge Kodiaks	3-0
Sat, Dec. 1	Chinese National Team	2-5
Fri, Dec. 28	Laurier Golden Hawks	2-3
Sat, Dec. 29	Guelph Gryphons	4-1
Sun, Dec. 30	McGill Martlets	2-1
Fri, Jan. 04	Saskatchewan Huskies	3-2
Sat, Jan. 05	Saskatchewan Huskies	4-1
Fri, Jan. 11	Regina Cougars	7-2
Sat, Jan. 12	Regina Cougars	4-2
Fri, Jan. 18	Manitoba Bisons	3-2
Sat, Jan. 19	Manitoba Bisons	5-2
Fri, Feb. 01	UBC Thunderbirds	3-2
Sat, Feb. 02	UBC Thunderbirds	3-0
Fri, Feb. 08	Lethbridge Kodiaks	7-1
Sat, Feb. 09	Lethbridge Kodiaks	9-1

== Postseason ==
- Canada West Semifinals

Date	Opponent	Score	Goals
Fri, Feb. 15	Regina Cougars	4-0	Miller 3, Cabana
Sat, Feb. 16	Regina Cougars	4-1	Cabana, Mucci, Reeve, Miller

- Canada West Finals

Date	Opponent	Score	Goals
Fri, Feb. 22	Manitoba Bisons	2-0	Newton, Wooster
Sat, Feb. 23	Manitoba Bisons	4-3 (3OT)	Robinson, Donahue, Miller, Wooster

== Player stats ==
Player	GP	G	A	Pts	Sh	+/-	Pen-Min	PP	SH	GW
Jennifer Newton	20	20	17	37	84	+16	7-14	7	1	4
Alana Cabana	24	12	14	26	73	+19	8-16	2	0	1
Leah Copeland	24	8	18	26	81	+16	11-22	5	0	1
Mia Mucci	21	11	14	25	66	+15	10-20	5	0	1
Miranda Miller	21	14	8	22	84	+18	16-32	5	1	3

== Awards and honors ==
- Leah Copeland, Canada West leader, Assists
- Jennifer Newton, Canada West Player of the Year
- Jennifer Newton, Canada West scoring champion
- Jennifer Newton, Canada West leader, Goals scored

=== Canada West All-Star team ===
- Jennifer Newton, First Team All-Star
- Alana Cabana, First Team All-Star
- Leah Copeland, Second Team All-Star
- Rayanne Reeve, Second Team All-Star
- Andrea Boras, All-Rookie team

== See also ==
- 2009–10 Alberta Pandas women's ice hockey season
