= 2009–10 Alberta Pandas women's ice hockey season =

Canadian Interuniversity Sport women's ice hockey champions
- Conference: 1 [[Canada West Universities Athletic Association|Canada West]]
- Home ice: Clare Drake Arena

Record
- Overall: 15-0-0

Coaches and captains
- Head coach: Howie Draper
- Assistant coaches: Dave Marcinyshyn; Danielle Bourgeois; Dave Crowder

The Alberta Pandas will represent the University of Alberta in the 2009-10 Canadian Interuniversity Sport women's hockey season. The Pandas won the Canadian Interuniversity Sport women's ice hockey championship. In the championship, they defeated the McGill Martlets by a score of 2-0

== Regular season ==
- November 7: By defeating the University of British Columbia Thunderbirds by a score of 3–2, the Pandas became the first women's hockey team in Canada West to hit double digits in the win column this season. The 2008–09 Canada West Rookie of the Year, and first star of the game, Stephanie Ramsay, scored the first goal of the game. She received the feed from sophomore forward Sarah Hilworth (the game's third star) at the 7:16 mark of the first. Having five assists through her first six games, Tamara Pickford scored 30 seconds into the second period.
- November 14: The #3-ranked University of Alberta Pandas earned a 3–0 win over the University of Lethbridge Pronghorns, Saturday night at Clare Drake Arena in Edmonton.

=== Standings ===
In Canada West, an overtime loss is worth 1 point

2009–10 Canada West standings
	Conference						
	GP	W	L	OTL	PTS	GF	GA
Alberta	24	23	1	0	46	94	21
Manitoba Bisons	24	18	6	0	36	63	46
Saskatchewan	24	16	8	3	35	88	50
Regina	24	7	17	6	20	43	83
Univ. of British Columbia Thunderbirds	24	8	16	1	17	48	67
Calgary	24	7	17	2	16	35	68
Lethbridge	24	5	19	4	14	36	72

- The top four teams qualify for the playoffs

=== Roster ===
Number	Name	Position	Height	Eligibility
1	Dana Vinge	Goaltender	5-4	4
4	Sarah Grandinetti	Defence	5-7	2
6	Katie Borbely	Forward		3
7	Meagan Cornelssen	Forward		1
9	Leanna Kordyban	Forward		4
10	Nicole Pratt	Forward		3
11	Andrea Boras	Defence		3
12	Stephanie Ramsay	Defence		2
13	Katie Stewart	Forward		1
14	Leah Copeland	Forward		4
15	Emily Burton	Forward		3
16	Sarah Hilworth	Forward		2
17	Lindsie Fairfield	Forward		4
18	Rayanne Reeve	Defence		4
19	Melody Howard	Forward		4
20	Jennifer Jubb	Forward		4
21	Monika Moskalski	Forward		2
22	Alannah Kedra	Forward		1
24	Jayme Clark	Defence		2
33	Kanesa Shwetz	Goaltender		4
35	Michala Jeffries	Goaltender		1
77	Alana Cabana	Forward	5-4	3
81	Tarin Podloski	Forward	5-5	5

=== Schedule ===
Date	Opponent	Score	Record
Sept. 12	Grant MacEwan	7-1	1-0-0
Sept. 24	NAIT	5-2	2-0-0
Sept. 26	Univ. of British Columbia	4-2	3-0-0
Sept. 27	British Columbia Under 18	3-2	4-0-0
Oct. 1	@ Red Deer College	5-0	5-0-0
Oct. 9	Regina	4-0	6-0-0
Oct. 10	Regina	3-2	7-0-0
Oct. 16	Manitoba	6-1	8-0-0
Oct. 17	Manitoba	4-1	9-0-0
Oct. 23	@ Saskatchewan	2-1	10-0-0
Oct. 24	@ Saskatchewan	3-2	11-0-0
Oct. 30	@ Regina	7-0	12-0-0
Oct. 31	@ Regina	7-0	13-0-0
Nov. 6	Univ. of British Columbia	8-0	14-0-0
Nov. 7	Univ. of British Columbia	3-2	15-0-0
Nov. 13	Lethbridge	4-1	16-0-0
Nov. 14	Lethbridge	3-0	17-0-0
Nov. 27	Calgary		
Nov. 28	@ Calgary		
Jan. 8	@ Calgary		
Jan. 9	Calgary		
Jan. 15	@ Univ. of British Columbia		
Jan. 16	@ Univ. of British Columbia		
Jan. 22	Saskatchewan		
Jan. 23	Saskatchewan		

== Player stats ==
=== Skaters ===
Player	Goals	Assists	Points	Shots	+/-	PIM

=== Goaltenders ===
Player	Games played	Minutes	Goals Against	Wins	Losses	Ties	Shutouts	Save %	Goals Against Average

== Postseason ==
- The Alberta Pandas defeated the McGill Martlets to claim the 2010 Canadian Interuniversity Championship. The Pandas ended the Martlets historic 86-game unbeaten streak against CIS opponents. Said streak dated back to December 30 of 2007. It was the Pandas who also beat the Martlets back on that date. Alberta had notched a 2-1 shootout victory. With the win, the Pandas also snapped the Martlets 20 game unbeaten streak in the postseason. This streak is also linked to the Alberta Pandas who claimed a 4-0 win in the 2007 CIS gold medal game. In the 2010 Championship Game, Melody Howard's unassisted goal at 6:09 in the first period held up as the game-winning goal. Forward Alana Cabana scored the second goal of the game.

=== CIS Tournament ===
Date	Opponent	Location	Score
March 14	McGill Martlets	Antigonish, NS	2-0

== Awards and honors ==
- CIS Tournament championship player of the game: Jennifer Jubb (Alberta Pandas)
- CIS Tournament MVP: Stephanie Ramsay, Alberta
- CIS Tournament All-Stars
  - Goaltender: Dana Vinge, Alberta
  - Defense: Stephanie Ramsay, Alberta
  - Forward: Leah Copeland, Alberta

== See also ==
- 2007–08 Alberta Pandas women's ice hockey season
