= Alberta Pandas ice hockey =

Canadian university hockey team

- University: University of Alberta
- Conference: Canada West
- Head coach: Darren Bilawchuk; 1st season, 31–11–0
- Arena: Clare Drake Arena; Edmonton, Alberta
- Colors: Green, Gold, and White

U Sports tournament champions
- 2000, 2002, 2003, 2004, 2006, 2007, 2010, 2017

Conference tournament champions
- 1998, 1999, 2000, 2002, 2003, 2004, 2005, 2006, 2007, 2008, 2010, 2015, 2019, 2020, 2025

The Alberta Pandas ice hockey team represents the University of Alberta in the Canada West Universities Athletic Association of U Sports. The team was led by head coach Howie Draper from 1997 (the year the team joined U Sports) until 2023, when Draper left to become head coach of PWHL New York. The current head coach is Darren Bilawchuk. The program has won the most Canada West conference championships with 15 and the most U Sports national championships with eight.

On January 25, 2011, it was announced that the 1999–2000 University of Alberta Pandas hockey team would be inducted into the Alberta Hockey Hall of Fame.

== History ==
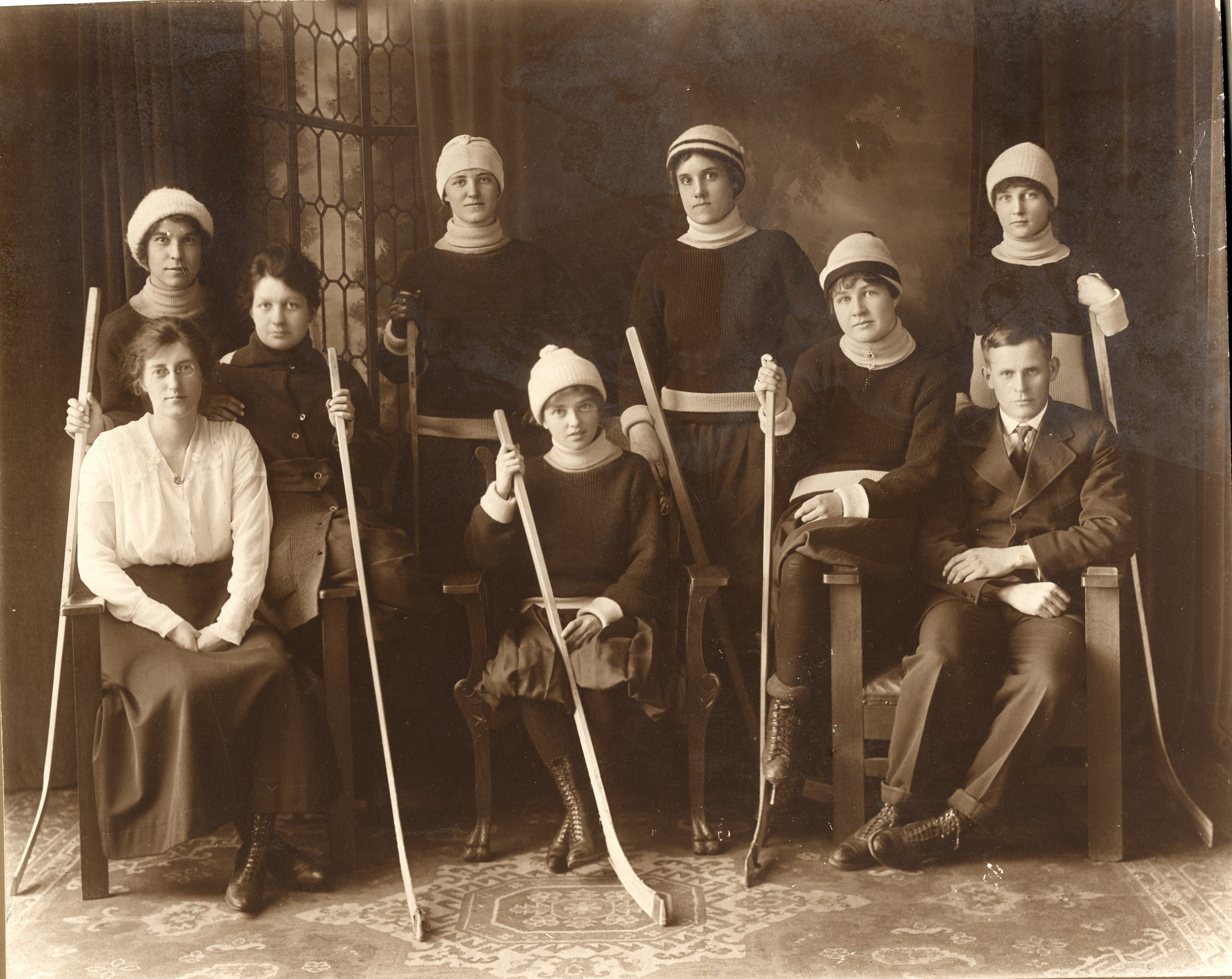
U of A Ladies' Hockey Team sometime between 1916 and 1917. Source: University of Alberta Archives, UAA-1977-045-002

In the era of the First World War, the University of Alberta formed men's ice hockey and women's ice hockey teams. The women's team played many community based teams.

The University of Alberta played the Edmonton Monarchs in the Monarchs first ever game in 1918. The city of Edmonton would organize women's ice hockey into three divisions in 1930: junior, intermediate and senior. The Edmonton Monarchs and the University of Alberta were the only teams that comprised the senior division. In that same year, the University of Alberta would challenge the Edmonton Monarchs for the Alpine Cup. The Monarchs prevailed by a 1–0 score. By 1934, the University of Alberta was demoted to the intermediate division. In 1937, the University of Alberta competed for the Alpine Cup, contested at the Banff Winter Carnival. The club lost to the Calgary Avenue Grills team.

== U Sports ==
On March 14, 2004, the Pandas won their third consecutive National Championship and their fourth in five years. The Pandas became the first team to win three consecutive championships which remains unmatched as of 2020. The win came courtesy of a 2–0 tally over the Ottawa Gee-Gees. For the season, the Pandas went 20–0–0 in Canada West play, 7–0 in the postseason, and a 35–0–0 overall mark. U Sports Player of the Year Danielle Bourgeois scored both goals in the game as Alberta outshot Ottawa 45–14 overall. The game-winning goal was assisted by Canadian national team member Delaney Collins. With the triumph, the Pandas ran their undefeated streak against U Sports opponents to 81 games. During the streak, their last loss to a U Sports team was on October 13, 2001.

On March 14, 2010, the Pandas won the Canadian Interuniversity Sport women's ice hockey championship which was their seventh title in the 13 years since the tournament's inception. In the gold-medal game, they defeated the McGill Martlets by a score of 2–0. While the program did not have as much of a dominant national run in the next decade, the team managed to claim their eighth national championship in 2017 after once again defeating the Martlets in double overtime by a score of 2–1. It was also the first time that the Pandas had won the National championship while not winning their conference championship in the same year.

Due to the COVID-19 pandemic in Canada and financial reasons, the University of Alberta announced that the Pandas would not participate in the 2020–21 season, if one were to be held. Former Pandas Hockey defender, Taylor Kezama, a 2017 U Sports National Champion, and a 2019 Canada West champion, was one of 18 former U Sports student-athletes announced among the inaugural participants of the U SPORTS Female Apprenticeship Coach Program.

== Year by year ==
National Tournament champions	Conference champions

Season	Coach	Conf. Record	Overall	Postseason
1997–98	Howie Draper	None	3–1–0	Fifth, CIAU tournament
1998–99	Howie Draper	4–1–1	20–8–3	Second, CIAU tournament
1999-00	Howie Draper	15–1–1	26–3–1	CIAU tournament champions
2000–01	Howie Draper	13–1–2	20–6–2	Did not qualify
2001–02	Howie Draper	16–0–0	33–1–0	CIS tournament champions
2002–03	Howie Draper	19–0–1	34–0–1	CIS tournament champions
2003–04	Howie Draper	20–0–0	35–0–0	CIS tournament champions
2004–05	Howie Draper	20–0–0	28–1–0	Second, CIS tournament
2005–06	Howie Draper	16–1–3	27–3–3	CIS tournament champions
2006–07	Howie Draper	21–3	33–4–1	CIS tournament champions
2007–08	Howie Draper	21–2–1	29–5–1	Fourth, CIS tournament
2008–09	Howie Draper	22–2	26–5	Did not qualify
2009–10	Howie Draper	23–1–0	33–1	CIS tournament champions
2010–11	Howie Draper	17–7	25–14	Fifth, CIS tournament
2011–12	Howie Draper	14–10	23–16	Fifth, CIS tournament
2012–13	Howie Draper	16–12	25–16	Did not qualify
2013–14	Howie Draper	20–8	23–11	Did not qualify
2014–15	Howie Draper	20–8	28–14	Eighth, CIS tournament
2015–16	Howie Draper	16–12	21–14	Did not qualify
2016–17	Howie Draper	21–7	36–9	U Sports tournament champions
2017–18	Howie Draper	19–9	27–12	Did not qualify
2018–19	Howie Draper	23–5	33–7	Fourth, U Sports tournament
2019–20	Howie Draper	20–8	28–10	Tournament cancelled due to COVID-19 pandemic.
2020–21	Cancelled due financial reasons caused by the COVID-19 pandemic			
2021–22	Howie Draper	13–7	22–11	Did not qualify
2022–23	Howie Draper	21–7	28–12	Did not qualify
2023–24	Darren Bilawchuk (interim)	21–7	30–10	Did not qualify

== Awards and honours ==
=== U Sports honours ===
- Brodrick Trophy (U Sports Most Valuable Player): Lori Shupak (2002), Danielle Bourgeois (2004, 2005), Lindsay McAlpine (2007), Tarin Podloski (2009), Alex Poznikoff (2019)
- U Sports Rookie of the Year: Danielle Bourgeois (2000), Madison Willan (2020)
- Marion Hillard Award (Student-Athlete Community Service): Taryn Barry (2007), Janelle Froehler (2016)
- Fox 40 U Sports Coach of the Year award: Howie Draper (2002, 2004, 2009, 2019)
- Kirsten Chamberlin, U Sports Athlete of the Month, February 2020

==== U Sports Tournament honours ====
- U Sports Championship Most Valuable Player: Danielle Bourgeois (2002, 2004), Tarin Podloski (2006), Lindsay McAlpine (2007), Stephanie Ramsay (2010), Lindsey Post (2017)

==== All-Canadian selections ====
- Danielle Bourgeois, 2003 CIS First Team All-Canadian
- Judy Diduck, 2003 CIS Second Team All-Canadian
- Lori Shupak, 2003 CIS Second Team All-Canadian
- Danielle Bourgeois, 2004 CIS First Team All-Canadian
- Delaney Collins, 2004 CIS First Team All-Canadian
- Judy Diduck, 2004 CIS First Team All-Canadian
- Kristen Hagg, 2006 CIS First Team All-Canadian
- Tarin Podloski, 2006 CIS Second-Team All-Canadian
- Lindsay McAlpine, 2007 CIS First Team All-Canadian
- Tarin Podloski, 2007 CIS Second Team All-Canadian
- Rayanee Reeve, 2007 CIS Second Team All-Canadian
- Nicole Pratt, 2010 All-CIS Second Team selection
- Tarin Podloski, 2010 All-CIS Second Team selection

==== All-Rookie Team selections ====
- Jessica Kampjes: 2012–13 USports All-Rookie Team

=== Canada West honors ===
==== Canada West All-Stars ====
First Team

- Autumn MacDougall, Forward, 2017–18 Canada West First-Team
- Alex Poznikoff, Forward, 2017–18 Canada West First-Team
- Grace Glover, Goaltender, 2024–25 Canada West First-Team

Second Team

- Cayle Dillon, Defense, 2017–18 Canada West Second-Team
- Taylor Kezama, Defense, 2017–18 Canada West Second-Team
- Madison Willan, Forward, 2022–23 Canada West Second-Team
- Taylor Anker, Defense, 2024–25 Canada West Second-Team
- Brooklyn Tews, Defense, 2024–25 Canada West Second-Team
- Abby Soyko, Forward, 2024–25 Canada West Second-Team
- Madison Willan, Forward, 2024–25 Canada West Second-Team
- Abby Soyko, Forward, 2025–26 Canada West Second-Team

==== Canada West All-Rookie ====
- Abby Krzyzaniak, Defense, 2017–18 Canada West All-Rookie

=== Team MVP ===
Season	MVP
1997–98	Krysty Lorenz
1998–99	Lori Shupak
1999-00; 2000–01	Stacey McCullough
2001–02; 2002–03; 2003–04; 2004–05	Danielle Bourgeois
2005–06	Kristen Hagg
2006–07	Lindsay McAlpine
2007–08	Jennifer Newton
2008–09	Tarin Podloski
2009–10	Dana Vinge

=== University honours ===
- Kristen Haag: 2021 inductee – University of Alberta Sports Wall of Fame

== International ==
=== Winter Universiade ===
- Andrea Boras Canada 2009 Winter Universiade, 2011 Winter Universiade (gold medal)
- Leah Copeland Canada: 2009 Winter Universiade
- Jennifer Newton Canada: 2009 Winter Universiade
- Stephanie Ramsay Canada: 2009 Winter Universiade
- Rayanne Reeve Canada: 2009 Winter Universiade
- Tess Houston Canada: 2015 Winter Universiade
- Jessica Kampjes Canada: 2015 Winter Universiade
- Alex Poznikoff, Forward, Canada: 2017 Winter Universiade
- Madison Willan, Forward, Canada: 2023 Winter Universiade (gold medal)

=== Olympians ===
Player	Event	Result
Judy Diduck	Ice hockey at the 1998 Winter Olympics	Silver

== Pandas in pro hockey ==
= CWHL All-Star	= NWHL All-Star	= Clarkson Cup Champion	= Isobel Cup Champion

Player	Position	Team(s)	League(s)	Years	Titles
Megan Eady		Melbourne Ice; SDE	AWIHL; SDHL		
Michala Jefferies	Goaltender	Sydney Sirens	AWIHL	1	
Autumn MacDougall	Forward	Buffalo Beauts	NWHL		
Lindsey Post	Goaltender	Calgary Inferno; SDE HF	CWHL; SDHL	4	

=== Pandas selected in the CWHL Draft ===
The following were selected in the 2010 CWHL Draft.

Player	Position	Team	Selection
Delaney Collins	Defense	Brampton Thunder	#5
