= Woolwich Memorial Centre =

Recreation facility in Elmira, Ontario

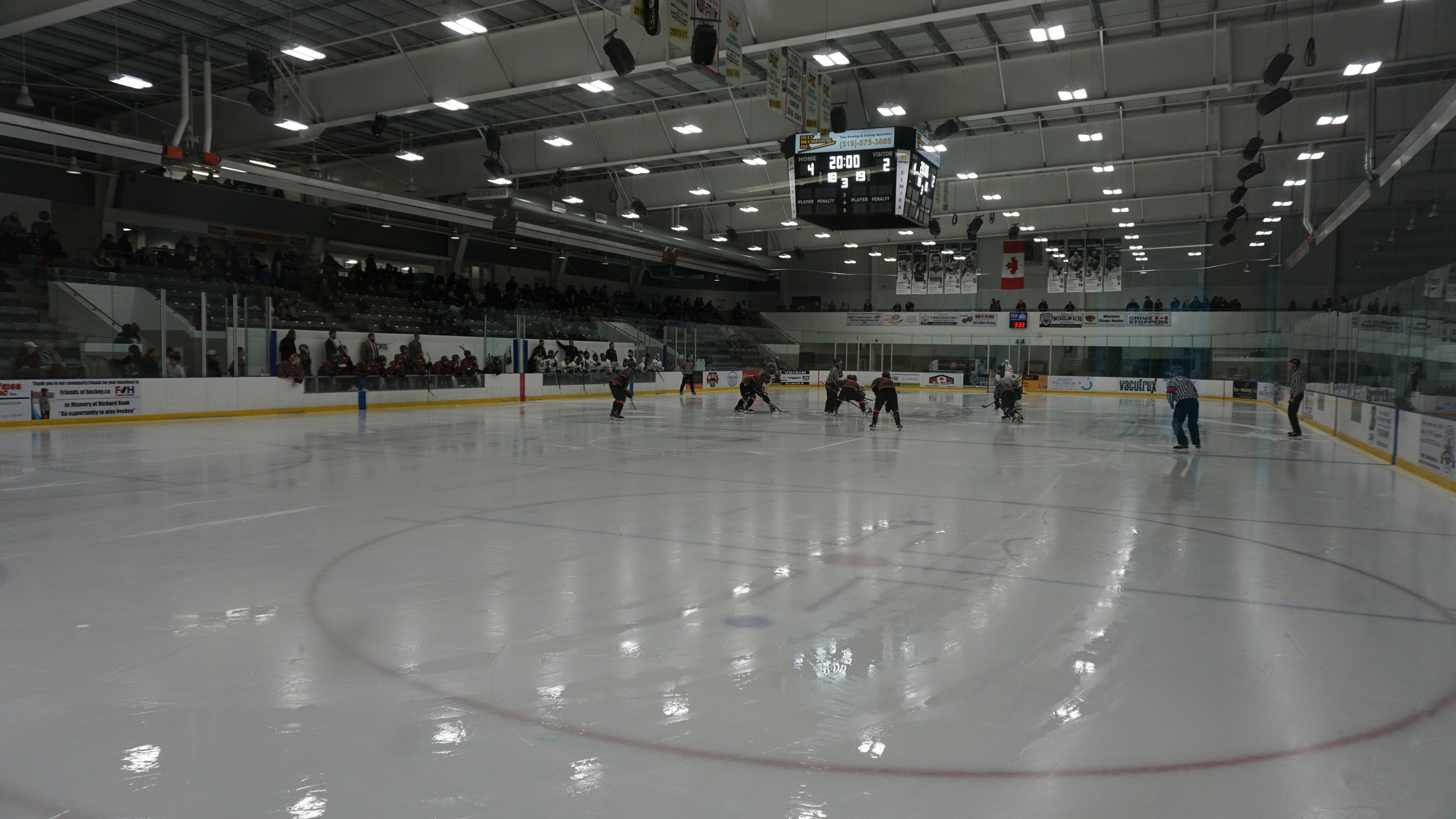
- Interactive map of Woolwich Memorial Centre
- Location: 24 Snyder St S, Elmira, ON N3B 2Z6
- Coordinates: 43.59617°N 80.56408°W
- Operator: Township of Woolwich
- Capacity: 1,300 Seats, 2,000 Standing

Construction
- Built: 2009
- Opened: 2009
- Cost: $ 19,405,000
- Architect: MacLennan Jaunkalns Miller Architects
- Main contractor: Melloul-Blamey

Tenants
- Elmira Sugar Kings 2009-Present, Woolwich Minor Hockey, Woolwich Seniors 55+ Centre, Woolwich Wild Hockey, Woolwich Thrasher Sledge Hockey, Woolwich Sunrays

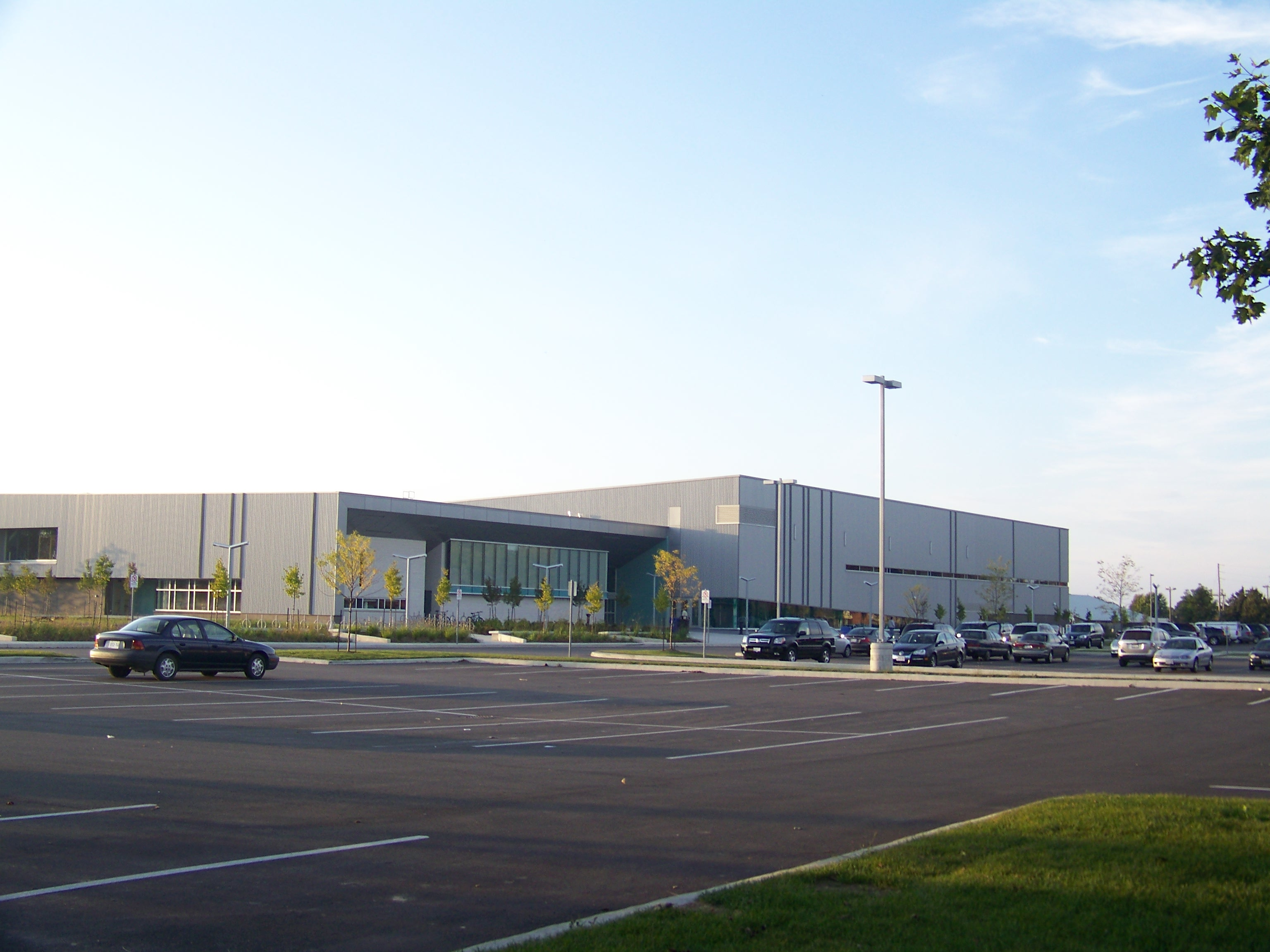
Exterior

The Woolwich Memorial Centre is a recreation facility in Elmira, Ontario, Canada. The facility is operated by the Township of Woolwich.

The Woolwich Memorial Centre (WMC) comprises two NHL-sized ice surfaces, two pools, a fitness centre and walking track. The facility also includes a community centre, seniors centre, youth centre, Concourse Cafe, two meeting rooms and offices for minor sport teams.

The primary rink is dedicated former Elmira-native Dan Snyder. The Atlanta Thrashers held a practice and promotional session in the arena on October 18, 2009.
