= 2024 U Sports Women's Ice Hockey Championship =

Canadian university ice hockey championship

- Season: 2023–24
- Teams: Eight
- Finals site: Merlis Belsher Place; Saskatoon, Saskatchewan
- Champions: Concordia Stingers (4th title)
- Runner-up: Toronto Varsity Blues
- Winning coach: Julie Chu (2nd title)
- Tournament MVP: Jessymaude Drapeau (Concordia)
- Television: CBC Sports

The 2024 U Sports Women's Ice Hockey Championship was held March 14–17, 2024, in Saskatoon, Saskatchewan, to determine a national champion for the 2023–24 U Sports women's ice hockey season. After finishing the regular season with a perfect 25–0 record, the RSEQ Champion Concordia Stingers defeated the Toronto Varsity Blues by a score of 3–1 to win the fourth gold medal in program history.

== Host ==
The tournament was hosted by the Saskatchewan Huskies and played at Merlis Belsher Place on the campus of the University of Saskatchewan. This was the first time that the University of Saskatchewan had hosted the tournament.

== Scheduled teams ==
Seed	Team	Qualified	Record	Last	Total
1	Concordia Stingers	RSEQ Champion	25–0	2022	3
2	UBC Thunderbirds	CW Champion	24–2	None	0
3	UNB Reds	AUS Champion	21–7	None	0
4	Waterloo Warriors	OUA Champion	18–10	None	0
5	St. Francis Xavier X-Women	AUS Finalist	21–7	None	0
6	Toronto Varsity Blues	OUA Finalist	19–9	2001	1
7	Montréal Carabins	RSEQ Finalist	13–12	2016	2
8	Saskatchewan Huskies	CW Quarterfinalist (Host)	19–9	None	0

== Championship bracket ==
First Round: March 14-15
1	Concordia Stingers	4
8	Saskatchewan Huskies	0
4	Waterloo Warriors	6
5	St. FX X-Women	1
2	UBC Thunderbirds	2
7	Montréal Carabins	4
3	UNB Reds	1
6	Toronto Varsity Blues	2

Semi-Finals: March 16
1	Concordia Stingers	3
4	Waterloo Warriors	1
7	Montréal Carabins	1
6	Toronto Varsity Blues	2 (SO)

Gold Medal Game: March 17
1	Concordia Stingers	3
6	Toronto Varsity Blues	1
Bronze Medal Game: March 17
4	Waterloo Warriors	1
7	Montréal Carabins	2 (SO)

== Results ==
=== First Round ===
March 14, 2024; 7:00 PM	(1) Concordia	4 – 0 (1–0, 1–0, 2–0)	(8) Saskatchewan	Merlis Belsher Place – Saskatoon, Saskatchewan; Attendance: 2,364

Game reference

Jordyn Verbeek
Goalies
Camryn Drever
Referees:
Hayley Butz
Jennifer Berezowski
Linesmen:
Erin Zach
Sophie Thomson

(Drapeau, Boyer) Emmy Fecteau (5) – 06:01	1–0
(Lavoie, Yelle) Rosalie Bégin-Cyr (5) – 23:12	2–0
(Thibault, Lavoie) Émilie Lussier (3) – 52:33	3–0
Émilie Lussier (4) – EN – 59:19	4–0

6 min
Penalties
4 min
41
Shots
26

March 14, 2024; 7:00 PM	(4) Waterloo	6 – 1 (1–0, 0–0, 5–0)	(5) St. Francis Xavier	Merlis Belsher Place – Saskatoon, Saskatchewan; Attendance: 654

Game reference

Mikayla Schnarr
Goalies
Amaya Giraudier
Referees:
Marie-Ève Couture
Shauna Neary
Linesmen:
Alexandra Clarke
Maxime Ferland

(Pritchard) Tatum James (1) – 00:27	1–0
(Mitchell) Sarah Bestic (1) – 47:36	2–0
(Lenardon, Herrfort) Tatum James (2) – 51:33	3–0
56:20 – SH – EN – Tatum James (3)	4–0
	4–1	57:29 – PP – Ireland McCloskey (2) (Burbidge, Martinsen)
57:45 – Carly Orth (2)	5–1
58:27 – PP – Madison Pritchard (1) (Fennell, James)	6–1

8 min
Penalties
8 min
28
Shots
21

March 15, 2024; 1:07 PM	(2) British Columbia	2 – 4 (1–1, 0–0, 1–3)	(7) Montreal	Merlis Belsher Place – Saskatoon, Saskatchewan; Attendance: 2,150

Game reference

Elise Hugens
Goalies
Aube Racine
Referees:
Brandy Beecroft
Amy Martin
Linesmen:
Melissa Brunn
Laura Gutauskas

	0–1	06:58 – Mylene Lefebvre (1) (Picard, Rolland)
(Kordic, McCallum) Cassidy Rhodes (1) – 13:45	1–1
	1–2	41:08 – Joannie Garand (1) (Picard)
(Bassi, MacKinnon) Sophia Gaskell (1) – PP – 42:38	2–2
	2–3	53:50 – Jade Picard (1) (Garand, Lefebvre)
	2–4	57:59 – EN – Laurie-Anne Ethier (1)

18 min
Penalties
6 min
25
Shots
22

March 14, 2024; 7:07 PM	(3) New Brunswick	1 – 2 (1–1, 0–0, 0–1)	(6) Toronto	Merlis Belsher Place – Saskatoon, Saskatchewan; Attendance: 771

Game reference

Kendra Woodland
Goalies
Erica Fryer
Referees:
Audrey-Anne Girard
Cianna Lieffers
Linesmen:
Stephanie Gagnon
Amy Laroche

	0–1	12:32 – Ashley Delahey (1) (Grawbarger, T. Delahey)
(Reiner, Jackson) Mackenzie Keenan (1) – 13:21	1–1
	1–2	Sophie Grawbarger (1) (Eagles)

0 min
Penalties
6 min
17
Shots
22

=== Semifinals ===
March 16, 2024; 4:07 PM	(1) Concordia	3 – 1 (2–0, 0–0, 1–1)	(4) Waterloo	Merlis Belsher Place – Saskatoon, Saskatchewan; Attendance: 647

Game reference

Jordyn Verbeek
Goalies
Mikayla Schnarr
Referees:
Cianna Lieffers
Brandy Breecroft
Linesmen:
Laura Gutauskas
Sophia Thomson

(Lavoie, Gendreau) Zoé Thibault (2) – 06:01	1–0
(Parent) Courtney Rice (1) – 18:12	2–0
	2–1	40:29 – PP – Tatum James (4) (Lenardon, Herrfort)
Jessymaude Drapeau (7) – SH – 58:40	3–1

8 min
Penalties
8 min
40
Shots
20

March 16, 2024; 7:07 PM	(6) Toronto	2 – 1 GWS (1–0, 0–0, 0–1, 0–0) (SO: 1–0)	(7) Montreal	Merlis Belsher Place – Saskatoon, Saskatchewan; Attendance: 817

Game reference
Mikayla Schnarr	Goalies	Amaya Giraudier	Referees: Shauna Neary; Jennifer Berezowski; Linesmen: Alexandra Clark; Erin Zach
(A. Delahey) Kalie Chan (1) – 09:55 / 1–0; / 1–1 / 45:01 – Juliette Rolland (1) (Boulanger, Picard)			Referees: Shauna Neary; Jennifer Berezowski; Linesmen: Alexandra Clark; Erin Zach
Elders (miss); Grawbarger (miss); T. Delahey (miss); Trussler (miss); Grawbarger (miss); A. Delahey	Shootout	Dumont (miss); Nadeau (miss); Picard (miss); Picard (miss); Poire-Lehoux (miss)	Referees: Shauna Neary; Jennifer Berezowski; Linesmen: Alexandra Clark; Erin Zach
6 min	Penalties	6 min	Referees: Shauna Neary; Jennifer Berezowski; Linesmen: Alexandra Clark; Erin Zach
24	Shots	26	Referees: Shauna Neary; Jennifer Berezowski; Linesmen: Alexandra Clark; Erin Zach

=== Gold Medal Game ===
March 17, 2024; 6:07 PM	(1) Concordia	3 – 1 (2–0, 0–0, 1–1)	(6) Toronto	Merlis Belsher Place – Saskatoon, Saskatchewan; Attendance: 1,196

Game reference

Jordyn Verbeek
Goalies
Erica Fryer
Referees:
Cianna Lieffers
Shauna Neary
Linesmen:
Alexandra Clarke
Laura Gutauskas

Émilie Lussier (5) – 01:09	1–0
(Philbert, Bégin-Cyr) Jessymaude Drapeau (8) – 08:19	2–0
(Thibault, Fecteau) Rosalie Bégin-Cyr (6) – PP – 58:40	3–0
	3–1	59:13 – Emma Potter (1) (Trussler, McKeown)

8 min
Penalties
4 min
25
Shots
20

Game MVPs: Rosalie Bégin-Cyr (CU) and Emma Potter (TOR)

=== Bronze Medal Game ===
March 17, 2024; 2:07 PM	(1) Waterloo	1 – 2 GWS (1–0, 0–0, 0–1, 0–0) (SO: 0–1)	(7) Montreal	Merlis Belsher Place – Saskatoon, Saskatchewan; Attendance: 580

Game reference
Mikayla Schnarr	Goalies	Aube Racine	Referees: Brandy Beecroft; Jennifer Berezowski; Linesmen: Erin Zach; Laura Gutauskas
(Pritchard, Fennell) Brooklyn Cole (1) – 10:41 / 1–0; / 1–1 / 59:35 – Juliette Rolland (2) (Picard, Laloche)			Referees: Brandy Beecroft; Jennifer Berezowski; Linesmen: Erin Zach; Laura Gutauskas
Cole (miss); Herrfort (miss); Cho (miss)	Shootout	Picard (miss); Nadeau; Poiré-Lehoux (miss)	Referees: Brandy Beecroft; Jennifer Berezowski; Linesmen: Erin Zach; Laura Gutauskas
6 min	Penalties	2 min	Referees: Brandy Beecroft; Jennifer Berezowski; Linesmen: Erin Zach; Laura Gutauskas
24	Shots	32	Referees: Brandy Beecroft; Jennifer Berezowski; Linesmen: Erin Zach; Laura Gutauskas

Game MVPs: Mikayla Schnarr (UW) and Aube Racine (MTL)

== Consolation bracket ==
Semi-Finals: March 16
8	Saskatchewan Huskies	3
5	St. FX X-Women	1
2	UBC Thunderbirds	4
3	UNB Reds	0

Fifth Place Game: March 17
8	Saskatchewan Huskies	1
2	UBC Thunderbirds	4

=== Consolation Semifinals ===
March 16, 2024; 10:07 AM	(5) St. Francis Xavier	1 – 3 (0–0, 1–3, 0–0)	(8) Saskatchewan	Merlis Belsher Place – Saskatoon, Saskatchewan; Attendance: 917

Game reference

Amaya Giraudier
Goalies
Camryn Drever
Referees:
Amy Martin
Hayley Butz
Linesmen:
Amy Laroche
Melissa Brunn

	0–1	21:23 – PP – Kelsey Hall (1) (Dyer, Stevely)
	0–2	23:22 – Sophie Lalor (1) (Ball, Kendall)
	0–3	26:06 – PP – Brooklyn Stevely (1) (Wilkinson, Kondrat)
Ashlyn Garnett (1) – 39:15	1–3

8 min
Penalties
8 min
38
Shots
21

March 16, 2024; 1:07 PM	(2) British Columbia	4 – 0 (1–0, 2–0, 1–0)	(3) New Brunswick	Merlis Belsher Place – Saskatoon, Saskatchewan; Attendance: 607

Game reference

Elise Hugens
Goalies
Kendra Woodland
Referees:
Marie-Ève Couture
Audrey-Anne Girard
Linesmen:
Stephanie Gagnon
Ali Beres

(Elliott) Joelle Fiala (1) – 13:06	1–0
(Gaskell) Chanreet Bassi (1) – PP – 22:14	2–0
(Gaskell, Morris) Chanreet Bassi (2) – 31:30	3–0
Sierra Laplante (1) – 42:49	4–0

6 min
Penalties
10 min
44
Shots
17

=== Consolation Finals ===
March 17, 2024; 10:00 AM	(2) British Columbia	4 – 1 (2–1, 1–0, 1–0)	(8) Saskatchewan	Merlis Belsher Place – Saskatoon, Saskatchewan; Attendance: 924

Game reference

Elise Hugens
Goalies
Camryn Drever
Referees:
Amy Martin
Marie-Ève Couture
Linesmen:
Sophie Thomson
Amy Laroche

(Wiebe, Kordic) Ashton Thorpe (1) – 06:19	1–0
	1–1	10:29 – Kennedy Brown (1) (Lausberg)
(Rhodes) Makenzie McCallum (2) – PP – 12:25	2–1
(Gaskell, Wong) Grace Elliott (2) – 38:22	3–1
(Fleming, Elliot) Cassidy Rhodes (2) – EN – 58:26	4–1

10 min
Penalties
10 min
27
Shots
18

Game MVPs: Joelle Fiala (UBC) and Kennedy Brown (SK)
