= UBC Thunderbirds women's ice hockey =

UBC Thunderbirds women's ice hockey program

- University: University of British Columbia
- Conference: Canada West
- Governing Body: U Sports
- Head coach: Graham Thomas; Since 2012–13 season
- Assistant coaches: Mike Sommer
- Arena: Doug Mitchell Thunderbird Sports Centre; Vancouver
- Colors: Blue and Gold

U Sports tournament appearances
- 2013, 2016, 2017, 2022, 2023, 2024, 2025

Conference tournament champions
- 2013, 2016, 2017, 2022, 2023, 2024

The UBC Thunderbirds women's ice hockey program represent the University of British Columbia in the Canada West Universities Athletic Association. The Thunderbirds have won six conference championships in U Sports women's ice hockey, most recently in 2024, and have made seven national championship appearances.

== History ==
=== Recent season-by-season record ===
Won U Sports Championship	Lost U Sports Championship	Conference champions	League leader

Year	Coach	W	OTW	L	OTL	GF	GA	Pts	Std	Conference Tournament
2009–10	Nancy Wilson	8	–	15	1	48	67	17	5th	Did not qualify
2010–11	Jen Rawson	7	–	16	1	56	92	11	6th	Did not qualify
2011–12	Jen Rawson	1	–	21	2	22	112	4	7th	Did not qualify
2012–13	Graham Thomas	17	–	7	4	72	63	38	3rd	Canada West champions Defeated Calgary Dinos
2013–14	Graham Thomas	20	–	6	2	81	57	42	3rd	Canada West semi-finals Lost vs Saskatchewan Huskies
2014–15	Graham Thomas	17	1	7	3	81	53	57	2nd	Canada West semi-finals Lost vs Manitoba Bisons
2015–16	Graham Thomas	13	3	9	3	69	53	48	2nd	Canada West champions Defeated Manitoba Bisons
2016–17	Graham Thomas	20	3	4	1	86	45	67	1st	Canada West champions Defeated Alberta Pandas
2017–18	Graham Thomas	16	3	6	3	60	41	56	3rd	Canada West semi-finals Lost vs Saskatchewan Huskies
2018–19	Graham Thomas	16	2	8	2	61	35	55	3rd	Canada West semi-finals Lost vs Manitoba Bisons
2019–20	Graham Thomas	9	1	14	4	41	59	34	6th	Canada West semi-finals Lost vs Alberta Pandas
2020–21	Graham Thomas	Cancelled due to the COVID-19 pandemic.								
2021–22	Graham Thomas	14	–	6	0	62	22	28	2nd	Canada West champions Defeated Saskatchewan Huskies
2022–23	Graham Thomas	24	–	2	2	97	35	50	1st	Canada West champions Defeated Mount Royal Cougars
2023–24	Graham Thomas	24	–	4	–	111	33	51	1st	Canada West champions Defeated Alberta Pandas

=== Team captains ===
- 2019–20: Mathea Fischer

== Thunderbirds in pro hockey ==
= CWHL All-Star	= NWHL All-Star	= Clarkson Cup Champion	= Isobel Cup Champion

Player	Position	Team(s)	League(s)	Years	Titles
Haleigh Callison	Defense	OSC Eisladies Berlin; Toronto Furies	EWHL; CWHL	3	
Sarah Casorso	Defense	EHV Sabres Wien; Buffalo Beauts; Aisulu Almaty Loan	EWHL; NWHL; EWHL	5	
Hannah Clayton-Carroll	Forward	Gothenburg HC	SDHL	1	
Danielle Dube	Goaltender	Long Beach Ice Dogs	IHL	1	
Mathea Fischer	Forward	Djurgardens IF	SDHL	1	
Kelly Murray	Defense	Calgary Inferno	CWHL		2019 Clarkson Cup
Tatiana Rafter	Forward	Buffalo Beauts; Metropolitan Riveters; SK Gorny Ukhta; Hvidovre	NWHL Russia; EWHL	5	2018 Isobel Cup
Rebecca Unrau	Forward	Karlskrona HK	Sweden Division 1	1	
Cassandra Vilgrain	Forward	Brynäs IF Dam	SDHL	1	
Rylind MacKinnon	Defense	Boston Fleet	PWHL	1	

== Olympians ==
- Vanessa Schaefer, Switzerland Forward: Ice hockey at the 2026 Winter Olympics – Women's tournament

=== International ===
- Melinda Choy Canada: 2009 Winter Universiade
- Christi Capozzi Canada: 2013 Winter Universiade
- Tatiana Rafter, Forward, Canada: 2013 Winter Universiade
- Kelly Murray, Defense, Canada: 2017 Winter Universiade
- Sophia Gaskell, Defense, Canada: Ice hockey at the 2025 Winter World University Games (silver)

== Awards and honours ==
- Graham Thomas, 2012–13 U Sports Coach of the Year, 2025-26 U Sports Coach of the Year

=== All-Canadians ===
- First Team
  - Haleigh Callison, 2005–06 First-Team All-Canadian
  - Sarah Casorso, 2013–14 First-Team All-Canadian
  - Tatiana Rafter, 2013–14 USports First Team All-Canadian
  - Sarah Casorso, 2014–15 USports First-Team All-Canadian
  - Kelly Murray, 2016–17 USports First Team All-Canadian
  - Tory Micklash, 2018–19 USports First Team All-Canadian
  - Grace Elliott, 2025–26 USports First Team All-Canadian
  - Jaylyn Morris, 2025–26 USports First Team All-Canadian
- Second Team
  - Lucie Fortin, 2003–04 Second-Team All-Canadian
  - Danielle Dube, 2012–13 Second-Team All-Canadian
  - Cassandra Vilgrain, 2016–17 USports Second Team All-Canadian

=== U Sports All-Rookie ===
- Melinda Choy, 2006–07 USports All-Rookie Team
- Rayna Cruickshank, 2009–10 USports All-Rookie Team
- Mairead Best, 2016–17 USports All-Rookie Team
- Rylind MacKinnon, 2018–19 USports All-Rookie Team

=== Canada West Awards ===
- Tatiana Rafter, 2013–14 Canada West Player of the Year
- Rylind MacKinnon, 2021–22 Canada West Defenceman of the Year
- Jaylyn Morris, 2024–25 Canada West Defenceman of the Year and 2025–26 Canada West Defenceman of the Year
- Grace Elliott, 2024–25 Canada West Player of the Year and 2025–26 Canada West Player of the Year
- Graham Thomas, 2025–26 Canada West Coach of the Year

==== Canada West All-Stars ====
- 1997–98, Michelle Johansson
- 1998–99, Laura Bennion
- First Team
  - Lucie Fortin, 2003–04 Canada West First-Team All-Star
  - Julia Staszewski, 2004–05 Canada West First-Team All-Star
  - Haleigh Callison, 2005–06 Canada West First-Team All-Star
  - Danielle Dube, 2012–13 Canada West First-Team All-Star
  - Kelly Murray, 2016–17 Canada West First-Team All-Star
  - Cassandra Vilgrain, 2016–17 Canada West First-Team All-Star
  - Celine Tardif, 2017–18 Canada West First-Team All-Stars
  - Chanreet Bassi, 2024–25 Canada West First Team
  - Grace Elliott, 2024–25 Canada West First Team
  - Jaylyn Morris, 2024–25 Canada West First Team
  - Grace Elliott, 2025–26 Canada West First Team
  - Jaylyn Morris, 2025–26 Canada West First Team
  - Annalise Wong, 2025–26 Canada West First Team
- Second Team
  - Lucie Fortin, 2002–03 Canada West Second-Team All-Star
  - Teryne Russell, 2004–05 Canada West Second-Team All-Star
  - Christi Capozzi, 2012–13 Canada West Second-Team All-Star
  - Tatiana Rafter, 2012–13 Canada West Second-Team All-Star
  - Kelly Murray, 2015–16 Canada West Second-Team All-Star
  - Rebecca Unrau, 2015–16 Canada West Second-Team All-Star
  - Hannah Clayton-Carroll, 2017–18 Canada West Second-Team All-Stars
  - Mackenzie Kordic, 2024–25 Canada West Second Team
  - Elise Hugens, Goaltender, 2025-26 Canada West Second Team

==== Canada West All-Rookie ====
- Mathea Fischer, 2015–16 Canada West All-Rookie Team
- Mairead Bast, 2016–17 Canada West All-Rookie Team
- Tory Micklash, 2016–17 Canada West All-Rookie Team
- Shay-Lee McConnell, 2017–18 Canada West All-Rookie Team
- Ireland Perrott, 2017–18 Canada West All-Rookie Team
- Rylind MacKinnon, 2018–19 Canada West All-Rookie Team
- Ashley McFadden, 2018–19 Canada West All-Rookie Team
- Kennesha Miswaggon, 2019–20 Canada West All-Rookie Team
  - Vanessa Schaeffer, 2024–25 Canada West All-Rookie Team

=== UBC Awards ===
- 2012–13 Du Vivier Team of the Year Award
- 2014–15: Lauren Logush - UBC Thunderbirds Female Rookie of the Year
- 2015–16 Danielle Dube: May Brown Trophy - Graduating Female Athlete of the Year
- 2019–20 TAC Buzz Moore Leadership Award: Mikayla Ogrodniczuk Co-winner
- Laura Bennion: UBC Hall of Fame Inductees (Builder's Category)

Kay Brearley Service Award (Community Service)

- 2019 Kay Brearley Service Award: Shiayli Toni
- 2020 Kay Brearley Service Award : Mikayla Ogrodniczuk

Carolyn Dobie-Smith Award (Student-Trainer Award)

- 2019 Carolyn Dobie-Smith Award: Walee Malik Co-Winner
- 2020 Carolyn Dobie-Smith Award: Luisa Ribeiro
