= Ice hockey at the 2023 Winter World University Games =

Ice hockey at the Lake Placid 2023 FISU World University Games
- Hockey pictogram
- Dates: 11–22 January 2023
- Teams: 12 (men); 6 (women)

Ice hockey at the 2023 Winter World University Games was held from 11 to 22 January in Lake Placid.

== Venues ==
| Potsdam | | Lake Placid | Canton |
|---|---|---|---|
| Cheel Arena; Capacity: 3,000 | Maxcy Hall; Capacity: 2,500 | Herb Brooks Arena (finals); Capacity: 7,700 | Roos House; Capacity: 970 |

== Medal summary ==
=== Medal table ===
* Host nation (United States)

| Rank | Nation | Gold | Silver | Bronze | Total |
|---|---|---|---|---|---|
| 1 | Canada | 2 | 0 | 0 | 2 |
| 2 | Japan | 0 | 1 | 0 | 1 |
| 2 | United States* | 0 | 1 | 0 | 1 |
| 4 | Czech Republic | 0 | 0 | 1 | 1 |
| 4 | Kazakhstan | 0 | 0 | 1 | 1 |
| Totals (5 entries) | | 2 | 2 | 2 | 6 |

=== Medalists ===
| Event | Gold | Silver | Bronze |
|---|---|---|---|
| Men's | Canada; Justin Bergeron; Kyle Bollers; Matthew Brassard; Andrew Coxhead; Brett Davis; Jared Dmytriw; Kai Edmonds; Brady Gilmour; Liam Hawel; Tyler Hylland; Austen Keating; Noah King; Simon Lafrance; Zachary Lavigne; Justin MacPherson; Adam McCormick; Jacob Paquette; Roddy Ross; Timothy Shea; Matthew Struthers; Scott Walford; Matthew Welsh; Jonathan Yantsis | United States; Luke Aquaro; Quinn Green; Matthew Hanewall; Zachary Heintz; Jack Jaunich; Ryan Kenny; Clark Kerner; Brendan Mark; Austin Master; Michael McChesney; Peter Morgan; John Mulera; Mason Palmer; Emmet Powell; Jack Ring; Samuel Ruffin; Evan Ruschil; Alexander Sheehy; Jaden Shields; Dysen Skinner; Cooper Swift; Steven Szmul; Mitchell Walinski | Kazakhstan; Stanislav Alexandrov; Oleg Boiko; Danil Butenko; Sayan Daniyar; Ruslan Demin; Madi Dikhanbek; Ivan Gavrilenko; Roman Kalmykov; Denis Karatayev; Ali Kassenov; Artyom Korolyov; Vsevolod Logvin; Abay Mangisbayev; Maxim Mukhametov; Batyrlan Muratov; Maxim Musorov; Kirill Nikitin; Aldiyar Nurlan; Alikhan Omirbekov; Kirill Polokhov; Andrey Shutov; Abylaikhan Suleimenov |
| Women's | Canada; Rosalie Bégin-Cyr; Carley Bossé-Olivier; Maggy Burbidge; Shae Demale; Maria Dominico; Camryn Drever; Aurelie Dubuc; Annabel Faubert; Emmy Fecteau; Céline Frappier; Leah Herrfort; Jenna MacLean; Lea MacLeod; Elizabeth Mura; Kelly-Ann Nadeau; Isabella Pozzi; Hannah Tait; Marie-Camille Théorêt; Audrey-Anne Veillette; Scout Watkins Southward; Madison Willan; Kendra Woodland | Japan; Yoshino Enomoto; Corazon Hinata; Minami Kamada; Sakura Kitamura; Kiku Kobayashi; Remi Koyama; Wakana Kurosu; Miyuu Masuhara; Marin Nagaoka; Yui Nakano; Haruna Nomura; Miyuri Ogawa; Mei Sakurai; Ami Sasaki; Kanami Seki; Akane Shiga; Chihiro Suzuki; Ayaka Tomiuchi; Moe Tsukimoto; Moeka Tsutsumi; Momoka Yamamoto; Shiori Yamashita | Czech Republic; Kristýna Bláhová; Viktorie Chladová; Martina Exnerová; Denisa Habartová; Alexandra Halounová; Sandra Halounová; Adéla Hanzlíková; Barbora Hrůšová; Denisa Jandová; Klára Jandušíková; Adéla Jůzková; Karolína Kosinová; Zuzana Martinů; Martina Mašková; Tereza Mazancová; Kristýna Pátková; Barbora Patočková; Daniela Pejšová; Kateřina Petřeková; Patricie Škorpíková; Tereza Topolská; Kateřina Zechovská |

== Men's tournament ==
2023 Winter World University Games – Men's tournament
- Hockey pictogram

Tournament details
- Host country: United States
- Venues: 4 (in 3 host cities)
- Dates: 11–22 January
- Teams: 12

Final positions
- Champions: Canada (5th title)
- Runners-up: United States
- Third place: Kazakhstan
- Fourth place: Japan

Tournament statistics
- Games played: 34
- Goals scored: 292 (8.59 per game)
- Scoring leader: (Kazakhstan) Maxim Mukhametov (15 points)

=== Preliminary round ===
All times are local (UTC–5).

==== Group A ====
| Pos | Team | Pld | W | OTW | OTL | L | GF | GA | GD | Pts | Qualification |
|---|---|---|---|---|---|---|---|---|---|---|---|
| 1 | Canada | 5 | 5 | 0 | 0 | 0 | 37 | 5 | +32 | 15 | Semifinals |
| 2 | Japan | 5 | 3 | 0 | 0 | 2 | 20 | 18 | +2 | 9 | Semifinals |
| 3 | Ukraine | 5 | 2 | 0 | 1 | 2 | 20 | 16 | +4 | 7 (Note: Czech Republic 1–3 Ukraine) | |
| 4 | Czech Republic | 5 | 2 | 0 | 1 | 2 | 16 | 14 | +2 | 7 | |
| 5 | Latvia | 5 | 0 | 2 | 0 | 3 | 13 | 27 | −14 | 4 | |
| 6 | Sweden | 5 | 1 | 0 | 0 | 4 | 11 | 37 | −26 | 3 | |

Source: Lake Placid 2023
Notes:

| 11 January 2023; 16:30 | Japan | 8–3 (1–1, 4–0, 3–2) | Latvia | Roos House, Canton |

Game reference
| 10 min | Penalties | 10 min |
| 21 | Shots | 18 |

| 12 January 2023; 09:30 | Sweden | 2–7 (1–4, 1–1, 0–2) | Czech Republic | Roos House, Canton |

Game reference
| 8 min | Penalties | 4 min |
| 21 | Shots | 56 |

| 12 January 2023; 13:00 | Ukraine | 1–6 (0–0, 0–2, 1–4) | Canada | Roos House, Canton |

Game reference
| 10 min | Penalties | 6 min |
| 12 | Shots | 46 |

| 13 January 2023; 13:00 | Canada | 10–2 (2–1, 4–0, 4–1) | Sweden | Roos House, Canton |

Game reference
| 8 min | Penalties | 14 min |
| 68 | Shots | 8 |

| 13 January 2023; 16:30 | Czech Republic | 5–1 (0–1, 2–0, 3–0) | Japan | Roos House, Canton |

Game reference
| 4 min | Penalties | 16 min |
| 33 | Shots | 20 |

| 14 January 2023; 16:30 | Latvia | 3–2 OT (0–1, 0–0, 2–1) (OT: 1–0) | Ukraine | Roos House, Canton |

Game reference
| 22 min | Penalties | 16 min |
| 22 | Shots | 47 |

| 15 January 2023; 09:30 | Canada | 8–2 (4–0, 2–0, 2–2) | Japan | Roos House, Canton |

Game reference
| 6 min | Penalties | 12 min |
| 50 | Shots | 20 |

| 15 January 2023; 13:00 | Czech Republic | 3–4 GWS (1–2, 1–1, 1–0) (OT: 0–0) (SO: 0–1) | Latvia | Roos House, Canton |

Game reference
| 39 min | Penalties | 9 min |
| 38 | Shots | 25 |

| 16 January 2023; 20:00 | Ukraine | 12–2 (4–2, 2–0, 5–0) | Sweden | Roos House, Canton |

Game reference
| 8 min | Penalties | 48 min |
| 60 | Shots | 20 |

| 17 January 2023; 13:00 | Latvia | 0–9 (0–2, 0–5, 0–2) | Canada | Roos House, Canton |

Game reference
| 10 min | Penalties | 2 min |
| 8 | Shots | 49 |

| 17 January 2023; 16:30 | Sweden | 0–5 (0–1, 0–3, 0–1) | Japan | Roos House, Canton |

Game reference
| 18 min | Penalties | 15 min |
| 17 | Shots | 45 |

| 18 January 2023; 16:30 | Canada | 4–0 (2–0, 0–0, 2–0) | Czech Republic | Roos House, Canton |

Game reference
| 14 min | Penalties | 20 min |
| 43 | Shots | 24 |

| 18 January 2023; 20:00 | Japan | 4–2 (2–0, 1–2, 1–0) | Ukraine | Roos House, Canton |

Game reference
| 10 min | Penalties | 12 min |
| 35 | Shots | 33 |

| 19 January 2023; 16:30 | Latvia | 3–5 (0–1, 1–3, 2–1) | Sweden | Roos House, Canton |

Game reference
| 43 min | Penalties | 37 min |
| 32 | Shots | 22 |

| 19 January 2023; 20:00 | Czech Republic | 1–3 (1–0, 0–2, 0–1) | Ukraine | Roos House, Canton |

Game reference
| 10 min | Penalties | 12 min |
| 34 | Shots | 21 |

==== Group B ====
| Pos | Team | Pld | W | OTW | OTL | L | GF | GA | GD | Pts | Qualification |
|---|---|---|---|---|---|---|---|---|---|---|---|
| 1 | United States (H) | 5 | 4 | 0 | 0 | 1 | 41 | 7 | +34 | 12 (Note: United States 4–1 Kazakhstan) | Semifinals |
| 2 | Kazakhstan | 5 | 4 | 0 | 0 | 1 | 34 | 7 | +27 | 12 | Semifinals |
| 3 | Slovakia | 5 | 3 | 0 | 1 | 1 | 27 | 11 | +16 | 10 | |
| 4 | Hungary | 5 | 2 | 0 | 0 | 3 | 17 | 29 | −12 | 6 | |
| 5 | South Korea | 5 | 1 | 1 | 0 | 3 | 18 | 28 | −10 | 5 | |
| 6 | Great Britain | 5 | 0 | 0 | 0 | 5 | 8 | 63 | −55 | 0 | |

Source: Lake Placid 2023
(H) Host
Notes:

| 11 January 2023; 13:00 | Hungary | 0–4 (0–0, 0–2, 0–2) | Slovakia | Cheel Arena, Potsdam |

Game reference
| 12 min | Penalties | 6 min |
| 20 | Shots | 38 |

| 11 January 2023; 20:00 | Great Britain | 0–18 (0–6, 0–6, 0–6) | United States | Cheel Arena, Potsdam |

Game reference
| 4 min | Penalties | 4 min |
| 8 | Shots | 81 |

| 12 January 2023; 13:00 | South Korea | 1–5 (0–1, 1–4, 0–0) | Kazakhstan | Cheel Arena, Potsdam |

Game reference
| 12 min | Penalties | 6 min |
| 22 | Shots | 38 |

| 13 January 2023; 09:30 | Kazakhstan | 9–1 (5–0, 3–0, 1–1) | Hungary | Cheel Arena, Potsdam |

Game reference
| 6 min | Penalties | 20 min |
| 51 | Shots | 11 |

| 13 January 2023; 20:00 | Slovakia | 14–0 (5–0, 6–0, 3–0) | Great Britain | Cheel Arena, Potsdam |

Game reference
| 6 min | Penalties | 10 min |
| 64 | Shots | 5 |

| 14 January 2023; 20:00 | United States | 8–0 (5–0, 2–0, 1–0) | South Korea | Cheel Arena, Potsdam |

Game reference
| 2 min | Penalties | 10 min |
| 61 | Shots | 19 |

| 15 January 2023; 16:30 | Slovakia | 5–2 (1–0, 0–1, 4–1) | United States | Cheel Arena, Potsdam |

Game reference
| 6 min | Penalties | 31 min |
| 34 | Shots | 46 |

| 15 January 2023; 20:00 | Kazakhstan | 15–1 (6–1, 7–0, 2–0) | Great Britain | Cheel Arena, Potsdam |

Game reference
| 16 min | Penalties | 12 min |
| 56 | Shots | 20 |

| 16 January 2023; 13:00 | South Korea | 4–7 (1–3, 0–4, 3–0) | Hungary | Maxcy Hall, Potsdam |

Game reference
| 10 min | Penalties | 16 min |
| 31 | Shots | 18 |

| 16 January 2023; 16:30 | Kazakhstan | 4–0 (3–0, 1–0, 0–0) | Slovakia | Cheel Arena, Potsdam |

Game reference
| 18 min | Penalties | 8 min |
| 42 | Shots | 22 |

| 17 January 2023; 09:30 | Hungary | 8–3 (3–0, 3–0, 2–3) | Great Britain | Maxcy Hall, Potsdam |

Game reference
| 40 min | Penalties | 12 min |
| 38 | Shots | 28 |

| 18 January 2023; 09:30 | United States | 4–1 (2–1, 2–0, 0–0) | Kazakhstan | Cheel Arena, Potsdam |

Game reference
| 8 min | Penalties | 2 min |
| 43 | Shots | 31 |

| 18 January 2023; 13:00 | Slovakia | 4–5 GWS (0–2, 2–0, 2–2) (OT: 0–0) (SO: 0–1) | South Korea | Cheel Arena, Potsdam |

Game reference
| 6 min | Penalties | 10 min |
| 53 | Shots | 33 |

| 19 January 2023; 09:30 | United States | 9–1 (2–0, 5–0, 2–1) | Hungary | Cheel Arena, Potsdam |

Game reference
| 18 min | Penalties | 20 min |
| 67 | Shots | 19 |

| 19 January 2023; 13:00 | Great Britain | 4–8 (0–2, 3–3, 1–3) | South Korea | Maxcy Hall, Potsdam |

Game reference
| 8 min | Penalties | 41 min |
| 36 | Shots | 40 |

=== Playoff round ===
==== Bracket ====
Semifinals
21 January
Canada | 4
Kazakhstan | 1
21 January
United States (OT) | 4
Japan | 3

Final
22 January
Canada | 7
United States | 2
Third place
22 January
Kazakhstan | 8
Japan | 1

==== Semifinals ====
| 21 January 2023; 09:35 | United States | 4–3 OT (3–2, 0–0, 0–1) (OT: 1–0) | Japan | Herb Brooks Arena, Lake Placid |

Game reference
| 8 min | Penalties | 10 min |
| 49 | Shots | 23 |

| 21 January 2023; 13:05 | Canada | 4–1 (1–0, 3–1, 0–0) | Kazakhstan | Herb Brooks Arena, Lake Placid |

Game reference
| 8 min | Penalties | 10 min |
| 38 | Shots | 11 |

==== Bronze medal game ====
| 22 January 2023; 11:05 | Kazakhstan | 8–1 (1–0, 4–1, 3–0) | Japan | Herb Brooks Arena, Lake Placid |

Game reference
| 6 min | Penalties | 6 min |
| 30 | Shots | 34 |

==== Gold medal game ====
| 22 January 2023; 17:10 | Canada | 7–2 (2–0, 3–1, 2–1) | United States | Herb Brooks Arena, Lake Placid |

Game reference
| 14 min | Penalties | 16 min |
| 47 | Shots | 19 |

== Women's tournament ==
2023 Winter World University Games – Women's tournament
- Hockey pictogram

Tournament details
- Host country: United States
- Venues: 2 (in 2 host cities)
- Dates: 11–21 January
- Teams: 6

Final positions
- Champions: Canada (4th title)
- Runners-up: Japan
- Third place: Czech Republic
- Fourth place: Slovakia

Tournament statistics
- Games played: 19
- Goals scored: 143 (7.53 per game)
- Scoring leader: (United States) Madeline Leidt (12 points)

=== Preliminary round ===
| Pos | Team | Pld | W | OTW | OTL | L | GF | GA | GD | Pts | Qualification |
|---|---|---|---|---|---|---|---|---|---|---|---|
| 1 | Canada | 5 | 5 | 0 | 0 | 0 | 31 | 2 | +29 | 15 | Semifinals |
| 2 | Czech Republic | 5 | 3 | 0 | 0 | 2 | 21 | 15 | +6 | 9 (Note: Japan 1–3 Czech Republic) | Semifinals |
| 3 | Japan | 5 | 3 | 0 | 0 | 2 | 16 | 12 | +4 | 9 | Semifinals |
| 4 | Slovakia | 5 | 2 | 0 | 0 | 3 | 18 | 14 | +4 | 6 (Note: United States 5–6 Slovakia) | Semifinals |
| 5 | United States (H) | 5 | 2 | 0 | 0 | 3 | 36 | 13 | +23 | 6 | |
| 6 | Great Britain | 5 | 0 | 0 | 0 | 5 | 2 | 68 | −66 | 0 | |

Source: Lake Placid 2023
(H) Host
Notes:

| 11 January 2023; 16:30 | Great Britain | 0–13 (0–2, 0–6, 0–5) | Czech Republic | Maxcy Hall, Potsdam |

Game reference
| 6 min | Penalties | 14 min |
| 3 | Shots | 65 |

| 11 January 2023; 20:00 | Slovakia | 0–4 (0–1, 0–0, 0–3) | Canada | Maxcy Hall, Potsdam |

Game reference
| 8 min | Penalties | 2 min |
| 13 | Shots | 39 |

| 12 January 2023; 13:00 | United States | 1–3 (1–0, 0–1, 0–2) | Japan | Maxcy Hall, Potsdam |

Game reference
| 6 min | Penalties | 6 min |
| 26 | Shots | 23 |

| 13 January 2023; 16:30 | Japan | 2–1 (0–1, 2–0, 0–0) | Slovakia | Maxcy Hall, Potsdam |

Game reference
| 4 min | Penalties | 10 min |
| 33 | Shots | 22 |

| 13 January 2023; 20:00 | Czech Republic | 2–8 (0–2, 1–5, 1–1) | United States | Maxcy Hall, Potsdam |

Game reference
| 8 min | Penalties | 12 min |
| 31 | Shots | 25 |

| 14 January 2023; 16:30 | Czech Republic | 1–5 (0–1, 1–2, 0–2) | Canada | Maxcy Hall, Potsdam |

Game reference
| 12 min | Penalties | 12 min |
| 18 | Shots | 47 |

| 14 January 2023; 20:00 | Great Britain | 1–10 (0–1, 0–4, 1–5) | Slovakia | Maxcy Hall, Potsdam |

Game reference
| 12 min | Penalties | 8 min |
| 9 | Shots | 78 |

| 15 January 2023; 16:30 | Canada | 6–0 (1–0, 4–0, 1–0) | Japan | Maxcy Hall, Potsdam |

Game reference
| 2 min | Penalties | 8 min |
| 30 | Shots | 17 |

| 15 January 2023; 20:00 | United States | 21–0 (5–0, 13–0, 3–0) | Great Britain | Maxcy Hall, Potsdam |

Game reference
| 4 min | Penalties | 6 min |
| 58 | Shots | 10 |

| 16 January 2023; 16:30 | United States | 5–6 (3–3, 1–2, 1–1) | Slovakia | Maxcy Hall, Potsdam |

Game reference
| 2 min | Penalties | 10 min |
| 37 | Shots | 33 |

| 16 January 2023; 20:00 | Japan | 1–3 (0–2, 0–1, 1–0) | Czech Republic | Maxcy Hall, Potsdam |

Game reference
| 10 min | Penalties | 12 min |
| 27 | Shots | 26 |

| 17 January 2023; 16:30 | Canada | 14–0 (2–0, 7–0, 5–0) | Great Britain | Maxcy Hall, Potsdam |

Game reference
| 2 min | Penalties | 4 min |
| 73 | Shots | 5 |

| 17 January 2023; 20:00 | Slovakia | 1–2 (0–1, 1–0, 0–1) | Czech Republic | Maxcy Hall, Potsdam |

Game reference
| 10 min | Penalties | 10 min |
| 23 | Shots | 19 |

| 18 January 2023; 16:30 | Japan | 10–1 (3–0, 4–1, 3–0) | Great Britain | Maxcy Hall, Potsdam |

Game reference
| 8 min | Penalties | 12 min |
| 88 | Shots | 9 |

| 18 January 2023; 20:00 | Canada | 2–1 (0–0, 1–0, 1–1) | United States | Maxcy Hall, Potsdam |

Game reference
| 12 min | Penalties | 10 min |
| 37 | Shots | 35 |

=== Playoff round ===
==== Bracket ====
Semifinals
20 January
Canada | 6
Slovakia | 1
20 January
Czech Republic | 0
Japan | 3

Final
21 January
Canada | 5
Japan | 0
Third place
21 January
Slovakia | 1
Czech Republic | 3

==== Semifinals ====
| 20 January 2023; 14:35 | Canada | 6–1 (0–1, 2–0, 4–0) | Slovakia | Herb Brooks Arena, Lake Placid |

Game reference

Kendra Woodland
Goalies
Adriána Štofanková
Referees:
(Canada) Amy Martin
(Latvia) Agnese Kārkliņa
Linesmen:
(Hungary) Zora Gottlibet
(United States) Abigail Torres

| | 0–1 | 11:37 – R. Halušková (L. Halušková, Ištocyová) |
| Viellette (Faubert) – 22:10 | 1–1 |
| Herrfort (Demale) – 24:21 | 2–1 |
| Pozzi – 40:11 | 3–1 |
| Dominico (Théorêt, Nadeau) – 43:30 | 4–1 |
| Fecteau (Viellette, Burbidge) (PP) – 49:51 | 5–1 |
| Bossé-Olivier (MacLeod, Mura) (PP) – 59:51 | 6–1 |

8 min
Penalties
14 min
45
Shots
22

| 20 January 2023; 20:05 | Czech Republic | 0–3 (0–1, 0–1, 0–1) | Japan | Herb Brooks Arena, Lake Placid |

Game reference

Kateřina Zechovská
Goalies
Miyuu Masuhara
Referees:
(Switzerland) Mariko Dale
(Japan) Miyuki Nakayama
Linesmen:
(Hungary) Adrienn Paulheim
(Switzerland) Michele Muller

| 0–1 | 12:11 – Sakurai (Yamashita, Enomoto) |
| 0–2 | 25:52 – Enomoto (Yamashita) (PP) |
| 0–3 | 49:30 – Koyama (Ak. Shiga) |

10 min
Penalties
8 min
14
Shots
30

==== Bronze medal game ====
| 21 January 2023; 17:05 | Slovakia | 1–3 (0–1, 1–1, 0–1) | Czech Republic | Herb Brooks Arena, Lake Placid |

Game reference

Andrea Rišianová
Goalies
Kateřina Zechovská
Referees:
(United States) Charlotte Hurley
(Canada) Amy Martin
Linesmen:
(United States) Rylie Lissebeck
(United States) Abigail Torres

| | 0–1 | 16:37 – S. Halounová (A. Halounová, Jandušíková) (PP) |
| Halušková – 21:01 | 1–1 |
| | 1–2 | 21:51 – Kosinová |
| | 1–3 | 49:02 – Pátková (S. Halounová) |

12 min
Penalties
39 min
36
Shots
27

==== Gold medal game ====
| 21 January 2023; 20:35 | Canada | 5–0 (0–0, 4–0, 1–0) | Japan | Herb Brooks Arena, Lake Placid |

Game reference

Kendra Woodland
Goalies
Miyuu Masuhara
Referees:
(Latvia) Agnese Kārkliņa
(Germany) Svenja Strohmenger
Linesmen:
(Sweden) Alexandra Köhl
(Slovakia) Eva Mária Moleková

| Veillette (Herrfort, Demale) – 21:16 | 1–0 |
| Dominico (Frappier, Théorêt) – 26:01 | 2–0 |
| Burbidge (Willan) (PP2) – 29:26 | 3–0 |
| Frappier – 30:50 | 4–0 |
| Mura (Veillette) – 44:44 | 5–0 |

4 min
Penalties
12 min
36
Shots
12
