= Merlis Belsher Place =

Hockey arena in Saskatoon, Canada

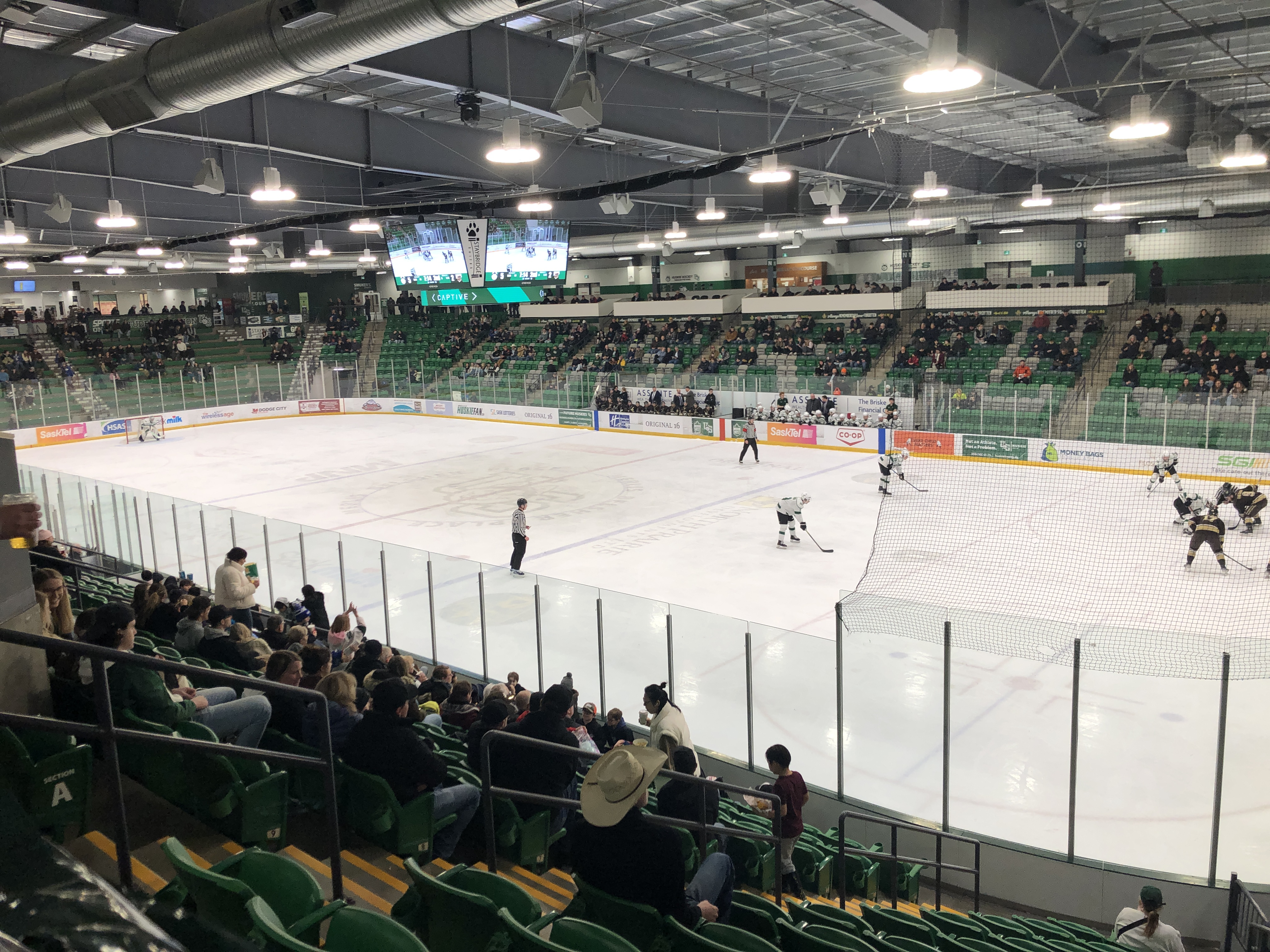
- The arena during a hockey game in 2024
- Interactive map of Merlis Belsher Place
- Address: 100 Fieldhouse Road; Saskatoon; Canada
- Coordinates: 52.126190°N 106.626686°W
- Owner: University of Saskatchewan
- Operator: USaskatchewan Athletics
- Capacity: Ice hockey: 2,700
- Type: Arena
- Current use: Ice hockey Basketball

Construction
- Groundbreaking: 2017
- Opened: 2018; 8 years ago
- Cost: C$51 million

Tenants
- Saskatchewan Huskies ice hockey (2018–present); Saskatoon Contacts (SMHA) (2018–present); Saskatoon Stars (SMHA) (2018–present); Saskatoon Mamba (CEBL) (2026–present)

Website
- merlisbelsherplace.ca

Merlis Belsher Place is an arena located at the University of Saskatchewan in Saskatoon, Saskatchewan, Canada. It is the current home of the Saskatchewan Huskies men's and women's U Sports ice hockey teams. It hosts the Saskatoon Contacts and Saskatoon Stars of the Saskatoon Minor Hockey Association and the Saskatoon Mamba of the Canadian Elite Basketball League. The university also holds its annual convocation ceremonies at the arena.

== History ==
In 2016, the University of Saskatchewan announced plans to build a new athletics facility to replace the 90 year-old Rutherford Arena. Originally budgeted to cost $41 million, the University sought to raise the necessary funds through its Home Ice Campaign, which sought donations and fundraising opportunities from alumni, minor hockey associations, and the City of Saskatoon. The arena was named in honour of Merlis Belsher, an alumnus of the University's College of Law, following a donation of $12.25 million to the Campaign.

Construction of the facility officially began on April 28, 2017 with a ground-breaking ceremony. The arena was completed in time for the beginning of the 2018–19 Huskies season, with the women's hockey team hosting the first game in the arena's history on October 5, 2018. That fall, the Saskatoon Minor Hockey Association also began use of the facility, with the Saskatoon Contacts and Saskatoon Stars becoming full-time tenants. In 2026, the Saskatoon Mamba of the Canadian Elite Basketball League (CEBL) began splitting games between SaskTel Centre, which had previously hosted all of their games, and Merlis Belsher Place.

In 2019, the University of Saskatchewan announced that it was moving its annual convocation ceremonies to the facility, bringing them back to campus for the first time since the 1960s.

In 2020, amid the COVID-19 pandemic, Merlis Belsher Place was converted into a potential field hospital as a contingency for a possible surge of patients in the city. In 2021, the arena was converted into the site of the city's mass immunization clinic. The arena was re-converted into a sports facility in the fall of 2021.

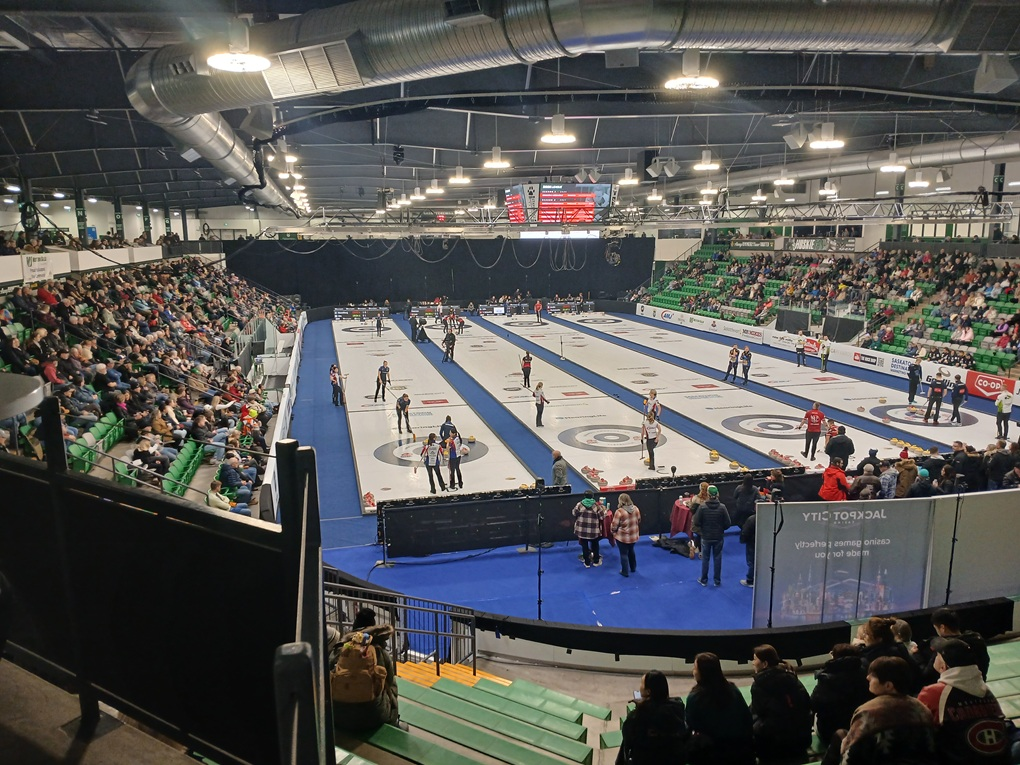
The 2025 Canadian Open at Merlis Belsher Place

In 2023, the arena hosted an event on the Grand Slam of Curling, for the first time, the 2023 Masters. In 2025, the arena hosted the Canadian Open.

Merlis Belsher Place hosted the 2024 U Sports Women's Hockey Championship.

== Facilities ==
Merlis Belsher Place was designed to replace several aging facilities at the University of Saskatchewan. As part of an agreement with the City of Saskatoon, the arena features two NHL-sized ice surfaces which can be utilized year-round and provide an added 1,500 hours of ice time for minor hockey in the city. The facility also features two NBA-sized basketball courts, which are used as practice space for the University's basketball teams, as well as team rooms for the University's soccer teams and change rooms that are open for use by community groups. The basketball courts are named in honour of Ron and Jane Graham, who contributed $4 million to ensure their inclusion in the new arena. The university also provided input into the facility's design to ensure it was optimized for convocation ceremonies.

== Events hosted ==
Year	Event	Sport
2023	Masters	Curling
2024	U Sports Women's Hockey Championship	Hockey
2025	Canadian Open	Curling
