= 2023 Masters (curling) =

Grand Slam of Curling event

2023 WFG Masters
- Host city: Saskatoon, Saskatchewan
- Arena: Merlis Belsher Place
- Dates: December 12–17
- Men's winner: (Italy) Team Retornaz
- Curling club: Trentino Curling, Cembra
- Skip: Joël Retornaz
- Third: Amos Mosaner
- Second: Sebastiano Arman
- Lead: Mattia Giovanella
- Coach: Ryan Fry
- Finalist: (Scotland) Ross Whyte
- Women's winner: (Ontario) Team Homan
- Curling club: Ottawa CC, Ottawa
- Skip: Rachel Homan
- Third: Tracy Fleury
- Second: Emma Miskew
- Lead: Sarah Wilkes
- Coach: Don Bartlett / Viktor Kjäll
- Finalist: (Switzerland) Silvana Tirinzoni

The 2023 WFG Masters was held from December 12 to 17 at the Merlis Belsher Place in Saskatoon, Saskatchewan. It was the third Grand Slam event and second major of the 2023–24 curling season.

== Qualification and Format ==
The top 16 ranked men's and women's teams on the World Curling Federation's world team rankings as of November 13, 2023 qualified for the event. The Grand Slam of Curling may fill one spot in each division as a sponsor's exemption. In the event that a team declines their invitation, the next-ranked team on the world team ranking is invited until the field is complete.

Then men's and women's teams were split into four pools of four, with teams crossing over to play four games against teams in an opposing pool. Pool A teams play Pool D teams, Pool B teams play Pool C teams, and vice versa. The top eight teams overall advanced to the playoffs. The event also saw the return of tiebreaker games, after a number of curlers complained about their removal from previous grand slam events that season.

=== Men ===
Top world team ranking men's teams:

1. (Italy) Joël Retornaz
2. (Alberta) Brendan Bottcher
3. (Newfoundland and Labrador) Brad Gushue
4. (Sweden) Niklas Edin
5. (Scotland) Bruce Mouat
6. (Switzerland) Yannick Schwaller
7. (Scotland) Ross Whyte
8. (Manitoba) Matt Dunstone
9. (Alberta) Kevin Koe
10. (United States) Korey Dropkin
11. (Norway) Magnus Ramsfjell
12. (Scotland) James Craik
13. (Manitoba) Reid Carruthers
14. (Alberta) Aaron Sluchinski
15. (Saskatchewan) Mike McEwen
16. (Scotland) Cameron Bryce

=== Women ===
Top world team ranking women's teams:

1. (Switzerland) Silvana Tirinzoni
2. (South Korea) Gim Eun-ji
3. (Manitoba) Kerri Einarson
4. (Ontario) Rachel Homan
5. (Sweden) Anna Hasselborg
6. (Manitoba) Jennifer Jones
7. (Japan) Satsuki Fujisawa
8. (Sweden) Isabella Wranå
9. (Manitoba) Kaitlyn Lawes
10. (Italy) Stefania Constantini
11. (United States) Tabitha Peterson
12. (South Korea) Kim Eun-jung
13. (Scotland) Rebecca Morrison
14. (Manitoba) Kate Cameron
15. (South Korea) ~~Ha Seung-youn~~
16. (United States) Delaney Strouse
17. (Nova Scotia) ~~Christina Black~~
18. (British Columbia) Clancy Grandy

== Men ==
=== Teams ===
The teams are listed as follows:

| Skip | Third | Second | Lead | Locale |
|---|---|---|---|---|
| Brendan Bottcher | Marc Kennedy | Brett Gallant | Ben Hebert | Calgary, Alberta |
| Cameron Bryce | Duncan Menzies | Luke Carson | Robin McCall | Kelso, Scotland |
| Brad Jacobs | Reid Carruthers | Derek Samagalski | Connor Njegovan | Winnipeg, Manitoba |
| James Craik | Mark Watt | Angus Bryce | Blair Haswell | Forfar, Scotland |
| Korey Dropkin (Fourth) | Andrew Stopera (Skip) | Mark Fenner | Thomas Howell | (United States) Duluth, Minnesota |
| Matt Dunstone | B. J. Neufeld | Colton Lott | Ryan Harnden | Winnipeg, Manitoba |
| Niklas Edin | Oskar Eriksson | Rasmus Wranå | Christoffer Sundgren | Karlstad, Sweden |
| Brad Gushue | Mark Nichols | E. J. Harnden | Geoff Walker | St. John's, Newfoundland and Labrador |
| Kevin Koe | Tyler Tardi | Jacques Gauthier | Karrick Martin | Calgary, Alberta |
| Mike McEwen | Colton Flasch | Kevin Marsh | Dan Marsh | Saskatoon, Saskatchewan |
| Bruce Mouat | – (Note: Team Mouat played with three players.) | Bobby Lammie | Hammy McMillan Jr. | Stirling, Scotland |
| Magnus Ramsfjell | Martin Sesaker | Bendik Ramsfjell | Gaute Nepstad | Trondheim, Norway |
| Joël Retornaz | Amos Mosaner | Sebastiano Arman | Mattia Giovanella | Trentino, Italy |
| Benoît Schwarz-van Berkel (Fourth) | Yannick Schwaller (Skip) | Sven Michel | Pablo Lachat | Geneva, Switzerland |
| Aaron Sluchinski | Jeremy Harty | Kerr Drummond | Dylan Webster | Airdrie, Alberta |
| Ross Whyte | Robin Brydone | Duncan McFadzean | Euan Kyle | Stirling, Scotland |

=== Round robin standings ===
Final Round Robin Standings

Key
| Teams to Playoffs |
| Teams to Tiebreaker |

| Pool A | W | L | PF | PA | SO |
|---|---|---|---|---|---|
| (Italy) Joël Retornaz | 3 | 1 | 23 | 21 | 7 |
| (Scotland) Bruce Mouat | 2 | 2 | 29 | 24 | 8 |
| (Scotland) Cameron Bryce | 1 | 3 | 21 | 22 | 5 |
| (Scotland) James Craik | 1 | 3 | 14 | 24 | 14 |

| Pool D | W | L | PF | PA | SO |
|---|---|---|---|---|---|
| (Manitoba) Matt Dunstone | 3 | 1 | 24 | 19 | 12 |
| (Manitoba) Team Carruthers | 3 | 1 | 22 | 15 | 16 |
| (Sweden) Niklas Edin | 2 | 2 | 23 | 27 | 2 |
| (Alberta) Kevin Koe | 1 | 3 | 22 | 26 | 4 |

| Pool B | W | L | PF | PA | SO |
|---|---|---|---|---|---|
| (Alberta) Brendan Bottcher | 3 | 1 | 22 | 16 | 10 |
| (Switzerland) Yannick Schwaller | 3 | 1 | 22 | 19 | 11 |
| (Norway) Magnus Ramsfjell | 3 | 1 | 19 | 15 | 15 |
| (Saskatchewan) Mike McEwen | 2 | 2 | 22 | 21 | 13 |

| Pool C | W | L | PF | PA | SO |
|---|---|---|---|---|---|
| (Newfoundland and Labrador) Brad Gushue | 3 | 1 | 23 | 17 | 3 |
| (Scotland) Ross Whyte | 2 | 2 | 23 | 20 | 1 |
| (Alberta) Aaron Sluchinski | 0 | 4 | 12 | 25 | 6 |
| (United States) Team Dropkin | 0 | 4 | 13 | 23 | 9 |

=== Round robin results ===
All draw times are listed in Central Time (UTC−06:00).

==== Draw 2 ====
Tuesday, December 12, 11:30 am

| Sheet A | 1 | 2 | 3 | 4 | 5 | 6 | 7 | 8 | Final |
| (Sweden) Niklas Edin | 0 | 1 | 0 | 2 | 0 | 2 | 0 | 2 | 7 |
| (Scotland) Cameron Bryce 🔨 | 2 | 0 | 1 | 0 | 1 | 0 | 0 | 0 | 4 |

| Sheet B | 1 | 2 | 3 | 4 | 5 | 6 | 7 | 8 | 9 | Final |
| (Scotland) Bruce Mouat | 0 | 0 | 2 | 2 | 0 | 0 | 2 | 0 | 2 | 8 |
| (Alberta) Kevin Koe 🔨 | 3 | 1 | 0 | 0 | 0 | 1 | 0 | 1 | 0 | 6 |

| Sheet C | 1 | 2 | 3 | 4 | 5 | 6 | 7 | 8 | Final |
| (Manitoba) Matt Dunstone 🔨 | 2 | 0 | 0 | 0 | 2 | 1 | 1 | X | 6 |
| (Scotland) James Craik | 0 | 0 | 1 | 0 | 0 | 0 | 0 | X | 1 |

| Sheet D | 1 | 2 | 3 | 4 | 5 | 6 | 7 | 8 | Final |
| (Italy) Joël Retornaz | 0 | 0 | 1 | 0 | 1 | 0 | 1 | X | 3 |
| (Manitoba) Team Carruthers 🔨 | 0 | 2 | 0 | 2 | 0 | 2 | 0 | X | 6 |

==== Draw 4 ====
Tuesday, December 12, 6:30 pm

| Sheet A | 1 | 2 | 3 | 4 | 5 | 6 | 7 | 8 | Final |
| (Alberta) Brendan Bottcher | 0 | 0 | 2 | 2 | 0 | 2 | 1 | X | 7 |
| (Alberta) Aaron Sluchinski 🔨 | 0 | 2 | 0 | 0 | 1 | 0 | 0 | X | 3 |

| Sheet B | 1 | 2 | 3 | 4 | 5 | 6 | 7 | 8 | 9 | Final |
| (Scotland) Ross Whyte | 0 | 1 | 0 | 2 | 0 | 1 | 1 | 0 | 3 | 8 |
| (Norway) Magnus Ramsfjell 🔨 | 1 | 0 | 2 | 0 | 1 | 0 | 0 | 1 | 0 | 5 |

| Sheet C | 1 | 2 | 3 | 4 | 5 | 6 | 7 | 8 | Final |
| (Switzerland) Yannick Schwaller 🔨 | 4 | 0 | 1 | 0 | 1 | 0 | 0 | X | 6 |
| (United States) Team Dropkin | 0 | 1 | 0 | 1 | 0 | 1 | 0 | X | 3 |

| Sheet D | 1 | 2 | 3 | 4 | 5 | 6 | 7 | 8 | Final |
| (Newfoundland and Labrador) Brad Gushue 🔨 | 1 | 0 | 0 | 3 | 2 | 0 | 3 | X | 9 |
| (Saskatchewan) Mike McEwen | 0 | 2 | 1 | 0 | 0 | 2 | 0 | X | 5 |

==== Draw 5 ====
Wednesday, December 13, 8:30 am

| Sheet A | 1 | 2 | 3 | 4 | 5 | 6 | 7 | 8 | Final |
| (Italy) Joël Retornaz 🔨 | 0 | 3 | 0 | 2 | 0 | 1 | 0 | 1 | 7 |
| (Manitoba) Matt Dunstone | 1 | 0 | 2 | 0 | 1 | 0 | 1 | 0 | 5 |

| Sheet B | 1 | 2 | 3 | 4 | 5 | 6 | 7 | 8 | Final |
| (Scotland) James Craik 🔨 | 2 | 0 | 1 | 0 | 0 | 0 | X | X | 3 |
| (Manitoba) Team Carruthers | 0 | 3 | 0 | 0 | 4 | 1 | X | X | 8 |

| Sheet C | 1 | 2 | 3 | 4 | 5 | 6 | 7 | 8 | Final |
| (Sweden) Niklas Edin | 0 | 0 | 3 | 0 | 0 | 3 | 0 | 0 | 6 |
| (Scotland) Bruce Mouat 🔨 | 0 | 2 | 0 | 4 | 1 | 0 | 1 | 5 | 13 |

| Sheet D | 1 | 2 | 3 | 4 | 5 | 6 | 7 | 8 | Final |
| (Alberta) Kevin Koe 🔨 | 2 | 0 | 1 | 0 | 1 | 1 | 0 | 1 | 6 |
| (Scotland) Cameron Bryce | 0 | 1 | 0 | 2 | 0 | 0 | 2 | 0 | 5 |

==== Draw 7 ====
Wednesday, December 13, 4:00 pm

| Sheet A | 1 | 2 | 3 | 4 | 5 | 6 | 7 | 8 | Final |
| (Scotland) Ross Whyte 🔨 | 1 | 1 | 1 | 1 | 0 | 3 | 0 | X | 7 |
| (Saskatchewan) Mike McEwen | 0 | 0 | 0 | 0 | 2 | 0 | 1 | X | 3 |

| Sheet B | 1 | 2 | 3 | 4 | 5 | 6 | 7 | 8 | 9 | Final |
| (Switzerland) Yannick Schwaller | 0 | 0 | 0 | 2 | 0 | 2 | 0 | 0 | 2 | 6 |
| (Alberta) Aaron Sluchinski 🔨 | 0 | 0 | 1 | 0 | 1 | 0 | 0 | 2 | 0 | 4 |

| Sheet C | 1 | 2 | 3 | 4 | 5 | 6 | 7 | 8 | Final |
| (Newfoundland and Labrador) Brad Gushue | 0 | 0 | 0 | 0 | 0 | 1 | 0 | X | 1 |
| (Norway) Magnus Ramsfjell 🔨 | 0 | 1 | 1 | 0 | 2 | 0 | 1 | X | 5 |

| Sheet D | 1 | 2 | 3 | 4 | 5 | 6 | 7 | 8 | Final |
| (Alberta) Brendan Bottcher | 0 | 0 | 2 | 0 | 3 | 0 | 0 | 1 | 6 |
| (United States) Team Dropkin 🔨 | 0 | 1 | 0 | 2 | 0 | 1 | 0 | 0 | 4 |

==== Draw 9 ====
Thursday, December 14, 8:30 am

| Sheet A | 1 | 2 | 3 | 4 | 5 | 6 | 7 | 8 | Final |
| (Newfoundland and Labrador) Brad Gushue 🔨 | 2 | 0 | 0 | 3 | 0 | 3 | X | X | 8 |
| (Switzerland) Yannick Schwaller | 0 | 1 | 1 | 0 | 1 | 0 | X | X | 3 |

| Sheet B | 1 | 2 | 3 | 4 | 5 | 6 | 7 | 8 | Final |
| (United States) Team Dropkin 🔨 | 0 | 1 | 0 | 0 | 0 | 2 | 0 | X | 3 |
| (Saskatchewan) Mike McEwen | 0 | 0 | 2 | 0 | 2 | 0 | 3 | X | 7 |

| Sheet C | 1 | 2 | 3 | 4 | 5 | 6 | 7 | 8 | Final |
| (Alberta) Brendan Bottcher | 0 | 2 | 0 | 2 | 0 | 0 | 0 | 1 | 5 |
| (Scotland) Ross Whyte 🔨 | 1 | 0 | 2 | 0 | 1 | 0 | 0 | 0 | 4 |

| Sheet D | 1 | 2 | 3 | 4 | 5 | 6 | 7 | 8 | Final |
| (Norway) Magnus Ramsfjell | 0 | 3 | 1 | 0 | 0 | 1 | 0 | X | 5 |
| (Alberta) Aaron Sluchinski 🔨 | 1 | 0 | 0 | 1 | 0 | 0 | 1 | X | 3 |

==== Draw 11 ====
Thursday, December 14, 4:00 pm

| Sheet A | 1 | 2 | 3 | 4 | 5 | 6 | 7 | 8 | Final |
| (Scotland) Bruce Mouat | 0 | 0 | 0 | 0 | 0 | 2 | 0 | X | 2 |
| (Manitoba) Team Carruthers 🔨 | 0 | 1 | 0 | 1 | 0 | 0 | 3 | X | 5 |

| Sheet B | 1 | 2 | 3 | 4 | 5 | 6 | 7 | 8 | Final |
| (Manitoba) Matt Dunstone | 0 | 0 | 2 | 0 | 3 | 0 | 0 | 1 | 6 |
| (Scotland) Cameron Bryce 🔨 | 0 | 1 | 0 | 2 | 0 | 1 | 1 | 0 | 5 |

| Sheet C | 1 | 2 | 3 | 4 | 5 | 6 | 7 | 8 | 9 | Final |
| (Italy) Joël Retornaz | 0 | 1 | 0 | 2 | 0 | 1 | 0 | 1 | 1 | 6 |
| (Alberta) Kevin Koe 🔨 | 1 | 0 | 2 | 0 | 1 | 0 | 1 | 0 | 0 | 5 |

| Sheet D | 1 | 2 | 3 | 4 | 5 | 6 | 7 | 8 | Final |
| (Sweden) Niklas Edin 🔨 | 0 | 2 | 0 | 0 | 2 | 0 | 0 | 1 | 5 |
| (Scotland) James Craik | 0 | 0 | 1 | 1 | 0 | 1 | 0 | 0 | 3 |

==== Draw 14 ====
Friday, December 15, 11:30 am

| Sheet A | 1 | 2 | 3 | 4 | 5 | 6 | 7 | 8 | Final |
| (United States) Team Dropkin 🔨 | 0 | 0 | 2 | 0 | 0 | 0 | 1 | 0 | 3 |
| (Norway) Magnus Ramsfjell | 0 | 0 | 0 | 1 | 0 | 1 | 0 | 2 | 4 |

| Sheet B | 1 | 2 | 3 | 4 | 5 | 6 | 7 | 8 | Final |
| (Alberta) Brendan Bottcher | 0 | 2 | 0 | 1 | 0 | 0 | 1 | 0 | 4 |
| (Newfoundland and Labrador) Brad Gushue 🔨 | 2 | 0 | 1 | 0 | 0 | 1 | 0 | 1 | 5 |

| Sheet C | 1 | 2 | 3 | 4 | 5 | 6 | 7 | 8 | Final |
| (Alberta) Aaron Sluchinski | 0 | 1 | 0 | 1 | 0 | 0 | X | X | 2 |
| (Saskatchewan) Mike McEwen 🔨 | 3 | 0 | 2 | 0 | 1 | 1 | X | X | 7 |

| Sheet D | 1 | 2 | 3 | 4 | 5 | 6 | 7 | 8 | Final |
| (Scotland) Ross Whyte 🔨 | 0 | 1 | 0 | 2 | 0 | 0 | 1 | X | 4 |
| (Switzerland) Yannick Schwaller | 0 | 0 | 3 | 0 | 2 | 2 | 0 | X | 7 |

==== Draw 16 ====
Friday, December 15, 7:30 pm

| Sheet A | 1 | 2 | 3 | 4 | 5 | 6 | 7 | 8 | 9 | Final |
| (Alberta) Kevin Koe 🔨 | 1 | 0 | 0 | 1 | 0 | 0 | 0 | 3 | 0 | 5 |
| (Scotland) James Craik | 0 | 1 | 0 | 0 | 2 | 2 | 0 | 0 | 2 | 7 |

| Sheet B | 1 | 2 | 3 | 4 | 5 | 6 | 7 | 8 | Final |
| (Italy) Joël Retornaz | 0 | 2 | 0 | 2 | 0 | 0 | 2 | 1 | 7 |
| (Sweden) Niklas Edin 🔨 | 1 | 0 | 1 | 0 | 1 | 2 | 0 | 0 | 5 |

| Sheet C | 1 | 2 | 3 | 4 | 5 | 6 | 7 | 8 | Final |
| (Manitoba) Team Carruthers | 0 | 2 | 1 | 0 | 0 | 0 | 0 | X | 3 |
| (Scotland) Cameron Bryce 🔨 | 2 | 0 | 0 | 1 | 1 | 1 | 2 | X | 7 |

| Sheet D | 1 | 2 | 3 | 4 | 5 | 6 | 7 | 8 | 9 | Final |
| (Scotland) Bruce Mouat | 1 | 1 | 0 | 1 | 0 | 2 | 0 | 1 | 0 | 6 |
| (Manitoba) Matt Dunstone 🔨 | 0 | 0 | 2 | 0 | 2 | 0 | 2 | 0 | 1 | 7 |

=== Tiebreaker ===
Saturday, December 16, 7:00 am

| Sheet C | 1 | 2 | 3 | 4 | 5 | 6 | 7 | 8 | Final |
| (Scotland) Ross Whyte | 0 | 1 | 0 | 2 | 0 | 0 | 2 | X | 5 |
| (Sweden) Niklas Edin 🔨 | 2 | 0 | 1 | 0 | 0 | 0 | 0 | X | 3 |

Player percentages
| (Scotland) Team Whyte | | (Sweden) Team Edin | |
|---|---|---|---|
| Euan Kyle | 94% | Christoffer Sundgren | 92% |
| Duncan McFadzean | 80% | Rasmus Wranå | 95% |
| Robin Brydone | 86% | Oskar Eriksson | 83% |
| Ross Whyte | 83% | Niklas Edin | 79% |
| Total | 86% | Total | 88% |

=== Playoffs ===
Quarterfinals
1 | (Newfoundland and Labrador) Brad Gushue | 2
8 | (Scotland) Ross Whyte | 5
4 | (Switzerland) Yannick Schwaller | 6
5 | (Manitoba) Matt Dunstone | 4
2 | (Italy) Joël Retornaz | 5
7 | (Manitoba) Team Carruthers | 1
3 | (Alberta) Brendan Bottcher | 8
6 | (Norway) Magnus Ramsfjell | 3

Semifinals
8 | (Scotland) Ross Whyte | 9
4 | (Switzerland) Yannick Schwaller | 4
2 | (Italy) Joël Retornaz | 7
3 | (Alberta) Brendan Bottcher | 6

Final
8 | (Scotland) Ross Whyte | 2
2 | (Italy) Joël Retornaz | 3

==== Quarterfinals ====
Saturday, December 16, 2:30 pm

| Sheet A | 1 | 2 | 3 | 4 | 5 | 6 | 7 | 8 | Final |
| (Newfoundland and Labrador) Brad Gushue 🔨 | 1 | 0 | 0 | 1 | 0 | 0 | 0 | X | 2 |
| (Scotland) Ross Whyte | 0 | 1 | 0 | 0 | 0 | 1 | 3 | X | 5 |

Player percentages
| (Newfoundland and Labrador) Team Gushue | | (Scotland) Team Whyte | |
|---|---|---|---|
| Geoff Walker | 95% | Euan Kyle | 97% |
| E. J. Harnden | 91% | Duncan McFadzean | 97% |
| Mark Nichols | 91% | Robin Brydone | 94% |
| Brad Gushue | 82% | Ross Whyte | 88% |
| Total | 90% | Total | 94% |

| Sheet B | 1 | 2 | 3 | 4 | 5 | 6 | 7 | 8 | Final |
| (Switzerland) Yannick Schwaller | 0 | 1 | 1 | 0 | 1 | 0 | 2 | 1 | 6 |
| (Manitoba) Matt Dunstone 🔨 | 1 | 0 | 0 | 2 | 0 | 1 | 0 | 0 | 4 |

Player percentages
| (Switzerland) Team Schwaller | | (Manitoba) Team Dunstone | |
|---|---|---|---|
| Pablo Lachat | 97% | Ryan Harnden | 95% |
| Sven Michel | 98% | Colton Lott | 88% |
| Yannick Schwaller | 97% | B. J. Neufeld | 94% |
| Benoît Schwarz-van Berkel | 88% | Matt Dunstone | 83% |
| Total | 95% | Total | 90% |

| Sheet C | 1 | 2 | 3 | 4 | 5 | 6 | 7 | 8 | Final |
| (Alberta) Brendan Bottcher | 1 | 1 | 0 | 1 | 0 | 5 | X | X | 8 |
| (Norway) Magnus Ramsfjell 🔨 | 0 | 0 | 2 | 0 | 1 | 0 | X | X | 3 |

Player percentages
| (Alberta) Team Bottcher | | (Norway) Team Ramsfjell | |
|---|---|---|---|
| Ben Hebert | 100% | Gaute Nepstad | 100% |
| Brett Gallant | 92% | Bendik Ramsfjell | 96% |
| Marc Kennedy | 94% | Martin Sesaker | 98% |
| Brendan Bottcher | 93% | Magnus Ramsfjell | 83% |
| Total | 95% | Total | 94% |

| Sheet D | 1 | 2 | 3 | 4 | 5 | 6 | 7 | 8 | Final |
| (Italy) Joël Retornaz 🔨 | 0 | 0 | 3 | 0 | 0 | 1 | 0 | 1 | 5 |
| (Manitoba) Team Carruthers | 0 | 1 | 0 | 0 | 0 | 0 | 0 | 0 | 1 |

Player percentages
| (Italy) Team Retornaz | | (Manitoba) Team Carruthers | |
|---|---|---|---|
| Mattia Giovanella | 88% | Connor Njegovan | 88% |
| Sebastiano Arman | 80% | Derek Samagalski | 69% |
| Amos Mosaner | 94% | Reid Carruthers | 77% |
| Joël Retornaz | 86% | Brad Jacobs | 68% |
| Total | 87% | Total | 75% |

==== Semifinals ====
Saturday, December 16, 6:30 pm

| Sheet A | 1 | 2 | 3 | 4 | 5 | 6 | 7 | 8 | 9 | Final |
| (Italy) Joël Retornaz | 0 | 1 | 0 | 2 | 0 | 2 | 1 | 0 | 1 | 7 |
| (Alberta) Brendan Bottcher 🔨 | 1 | 0 | 1 | 0 | 2 | 0 | 0 | 2 | 0 | 6 |

Player percentages
| (Italy) Team Retornaz | | (Alberta) Team Bottcher | |
|---|---|---|---|
| Mattia Giovanella | 90% | Ben Hebert | 94% |
| Sebastiano Arman | 90% | Brett Gallant | 92% |
| Amos Mosaner | 89% | Marc Kennedy | 90% |
| Joël Retornaz | 89% | Brendan Bottcher | 88% |
| Total | 90% | Total | 91% |

| Sheet C | 1 | 2 | 3 | 4 | 5 | 6 | 7 | 8 | Final |
| (Scotland) Ross Whyte | 0 | 2 | 0 | 4 | 0 | 3 | X | X | 9 |
| (Switzerland) Yannick Schwaller 🔨 | 0 | 0 | 2 | 0 | 2 | 0 | X | X | 4 |

Player percentages
| (Scotland) Team Whyte | | (Switzerland) Team Schwaller | |
|---|---|---|---|
| Euan Kyle | 94% | Pablo Lachat | 92% |
| Duncan McFadzean | 81% | Sven Michel | 73% |
| Robin Brydone | 83% | Yannick Schwaller | 90% |
| Ross Whyte | 92% | Benoît Schwarz-van Berkel | 81% |
| Total | 88% | Total | 84% |

==== Final ====
Sunday, December 17, 3:00 pm

| Sheet B | 1 | 2 | 3 | 4 | 5 | 6 | 7 | 8 | Final |
| (Scotland) Ross Whyte | 0 | 0 | 0 | 0 | 1 | 1 | 0 | 0 | 2 |
| (Italy) Joël Retornaz 🔨 | 0 | 0 | 0 | 2 | 0 | 0 | 0 | 1 | 3 |

Player percentages
| (Scotland) Team Whyte | | (Italy) Team Retornaz | |
|---|---|---|---|
| Euan Kyle | 95% | Mattia Giovanella | 94% |
| Duncan McFadzean | 81% | Sebastiano Arman | 92% |
| Robin Brydone | 92% | Amos Mosaner | 92% |
| Ross Whyte | 89% | Joël Retornaz | 91% |
| Total | 89% | Total | 92% |

== Women ==
=== Teams ===
The teams are listed as follows:

| Skip | Third | Second | Lead | Alternate | Locale |
|---|---|---|---|---|---|
| Kate Cameron | Meghan Walter | Taylor McDonald | Mackenzie Elias | | Winnipeg, Manitoba |
| Stefania Constantini | Elena Mathis | Marta Lo Deserto | Angela Romei | | Cortina d'Ampezzo, Italy |
| Kerri Einarson | Val Sweeting | Shannon Birchard | Briane Harris | | Gimli, Manitoba |
| Satsuki Fujisawa | Chinami Yoshida | Yumi Suzuki | Yurika Yoshida | Kotomi Ishizaki | Kitami, Japan |
| Gim Eun-ji | Kim Min-ji | Kim Su-ji | Seol Ye-eun | Seol Ye-ji | Uijeongbu, South Korea |
| Clancy Grandy | Kayla MacMillan | Lindsay Dubue | Sarah Loken | Rachelle Brown | Vancouver, British Columbia |
| Anna Hasselborg | Sara McManus | Agnes Knochenhauer | Sofia Mabergs | | Sundbyberg, Sweden |
| Rachel Homan | Tracy Fleury | Emma Miskew | Sarah Wilkes | | Ottawa, Ontario |
| Jennifer Jones | Karlee Burgess | Emily Zacharias | Lauren Lenentine | | Winnipeg, Manitoba |
| Kim Eun-jung | Kim Kyeong-ae | Kim Cho-hi | Kim Seon-yeong | Kim Yeong-mi | Gangneung, South Korea |
| Kaitlyn Lawes | Selena Njegovan | Jocelyn Peterman | Kristin MacCuish | | Winnipeg, Manitoba |
| Rebecca Morrison | Jennifer Dodds | Gina Aitken | Sophie Jackson | Sophie Sinclair | Stirling, Scotland |
| Tabitha Peterson | Cory Thiesse | Tara Peterson | Becca Hamilton | | (United States) St. Paul, Minnesota |
| Delaney Strouse | Anne O'Hara | Sydney Mullaney | Rebecca Rodgers | Susan Dudt | (United States) Traverse City, Michigan |
| Alina Pätz (Fourth) | Silvana Tirinzoni (Skip) | Selina Witschonke | Carole Howald | | Aarau, Switzerland |
| Isabella Wranå | Almida de Val | Maria Larsson | Linda Stenlund | | Sundbyberg, Sweden |

=== Round robin standings ===
Final Round Robin Standings

Key
| Teams to Playoffs |
| Teams to Tiebreakers |

| Pool A | W | L | PF | PA | SO |
|---|---|---|---|---|---|
| (Switzerland) Silvana Tirinzoni | 3 | 1 | 23 | 18 | 4 |
| (Sweden) Anna Hasselborg | 2 | 2 | 27 | 20 | 3 |
| (South Korea) Kim Eun-jung | 2 | 2 | 24 | 24 | 5 |
| (British Columbia) Clancy Grandy | 1 | 3 | 14 | 27 | 7 |

| Pool D | W | L | PF | PA | SO |
|---|---|---|---|---|---|
| (Ontario) Rachel Homan | 3 | 1 | 26 | 17 | 13 |
| (Sweden) Isabella Wranå | 2 | 2 | 25 | 27 | 2 |
| (Manitoba) Kaitlyn Lawes | 2 | 2 | 20 | 23 | 16 |
| (Scotland) Rebecca Morrison | 1 | 3 | 18 | 21 | 7 |

| Pool B | W | L | PF | PA | SO |
|---|---|---|---|---|---|
| (Manitoba) Jennifer Jones | 3 | 1 | 25 | 21 | 10 |
| (South Korea) Gim Eun-ji | 3 | 1 | 22 | 17 | 14 |
| (United States) Tabitha Peterson | 2 | 2 | 22 | 19 | 9 |
| (United States) Delaney Strouse | 2 | 2 | 17 | 13 | 11 |

| Pool C | W | L | PF | PA | SO |
|---|---|---|---|---|---|
| (Manitoba) Kerri Einarson | 2 | 2 | 18 | 20 | 1 |
| (Japan) Satsuki Fujisawa | 2 | 2 | 23 | 23 | 12 |
| (Manitoba) Kate Cameron | 2 | 2 | 14 | 17 | 15 |
| (Italy) Stefania Constantini | 0 | 4 | 15 | 26 | 6 |

=== Round robin results ===
All draw times are listed in Central Time (UTC−06:00).

==== Draw 1 ====
Tuesday, December 12, 8:00 am

| Sheet A | 1 | 2 | 3 | 4 | 5 | 6 | 7 | 8 | Final |
| (Japan) Satsuki Fujisawa | 0 | 1 | 1 | 1 | 1 | 1 | 0 | X | 5 |
| (United States) Delaney Strouse 🔨 | 1 | 0 | 0 | 0 | 0 | 0 | 2 | X | 3 |

| Sheet B | 1 | 2 | 3 | 4 | 5 | 6 | 7 | 8 | Final |
| (Manitoba) Jennifer Jones 🔨 | 0 | 1 | 0 | 2 | 1 | 0 | 0 | 1 | 5 |
| (Manitoba) Kate Cameron | 1 | 0 | 1 | 0 | 0 | 1 | 0 | 0 | 3 |

| Sheet C | 1 | 2 | 3 | 4 | 5 | 6 | 7 | 8 | Final |
| (Manitoba) Kerri Einarson 🔨 | 1 | 0 | 2 | 0 | 2 | 0 | 0 | 1 | 6 |
| (United States) Tabitha Peterson | 0 | 1 | 0 | 3 | 0 | 0 | 0 | 0 | 4 |

| Sheet D | 1 | 2 | 3 | 4 | 5 | 6 | 7 | 8 | Final |
| (South Korea) Gim Eun-ji | 1 | 0 | 1 | 0 | 1 | 0 | 0 | 2 | 5 |
| (Italy) Stefania Constantini 🔨 | 0 | 1 | 0 | 1 | 0 | 2 | 0 | 0 | 4 |

==== Draw 3 ====
Tuesday, December 12, 3:00 pm

| Sheet A | 1 | 2 | 3 | 4 | 5 | 6 | 7 | 8 | Final |
| (Ontario) Rachel Homan | 0 | 1 | 1 | 1 | 3 | 0 | X | X | 6 |
| (British Columbia) Clancy Grandy 🔨 | 0 | 0 | 0 | 0 | 0 | 1 | X | X | 1 |

| Sheet B | 1 | 2 | 3 | 4 | 5 | 6 | 7 | 8 | Final |
| (Sweden) Anna Hasselborg 🔨 | 2 | 1 | 0 | 2 | 2 | 0 | 2 | X | 9 |
| (Manitoba) Kaitlyn Lawes | 0 | 0 | 2 | 0 | 0 | 1 | 0 | X | 3 |

| Sheet C | 1 | 2 | 3 | 4 | 5 | 6 | 7 | 8 | 9 | Final |
| (Sweden) Isabella Wranå | 0 | 3 | 0 | 0 | 2 | 1 | 0 | 0 | 2 | 8 |
| (South Korea) Kim Eun-jung 🔨 | 2 | 0 | 1 | 0 | 0 | 0 | 2 | 1 | 0 | 6 |

| Sheet D | 1 | 2 | 3 | 4 | 5 | 6 | 7 | 8 | Final |
| (Switzerland) Silvana Tirinzoni 🔨 | 0 | 5 | 0 | 0 | 1 | 0 | 0 | 2 | 8 |
| (Scotland) Rebecca Morrison | 0 | 0 | 1 | 1 | 0 | 3 | 1 | 0 | 6 |

==== Draw 6 ====
Wednesday, December 13, 12:00 pm

| Sheet A | 1 | 2 | 3 | 4 | 5 | 6 | 7 | 8 | Final |
| (Manitoba) Kerri Einarson 🔨 | 1 | 0 | 0 | 0 | 1 | 0 | 1 | 1 | 4 |
| (Manitoba) Jennifer Jones | 0 | 2 | 0 | 1 | 0 | 2 | 0 | 0 | 5 |

| Sheet B | 1 | 2 | 3 | 4 | 5 | 6 | 7 | 8 | Final |
| (Italy) Stefania Constantini 🔨 | 0 | 0 | 0 | 0 | 1 | 0 | 1 | X | 2 |
| (United States) Delaney Strouse | 0 | 0 | 3 | 1 | 0 | 1 | 0 | X | 5 |

| Sheet C | 1 | 2 | 3 | 4 | 5 | 6 | 7 | 8 | 9 | Final |
| (South Korea) Gim Eun-ji 🔨 | 1 | 0 | 2 | 0 | 0 | 2 | 0 | 0 | 1 | 6 |
| (Japan) Satsuki Fujisawa | 0 | 2 | 0 | 1 | 1 | 0 | 0 | 1 | 0 | 5 |

| Sheet D | 1 | 2 | 3 | 4 | 5 | 6 | 7 | 8 | Final |
| (United States) Tabitha Peterson | 0 | 1 | 0 | 0 | 1 | 0 | 1 | X | 3 |
| (Manitoba) Kate Cameron 🔨 | 1 | 0 | 0 | 2 | 0 | 2 | 0 | X | 5 |

==== Draw 8 ====
Wednesday, December 13, 8:00 pm

| Sheet A | 1 | 2 | 3 | 4 | 5 | 6 | 7 | 8 | Final |
| (Manitoba) Kaitlyn Lawes 🔨 | 2 | 2 | 0 | 0 | 1 | 0 | 1 | 0 | 6 |
| (South Korea) Kim Eun-jung | 0 | 0 | 2 | 0 | 0 | 1 | 0 | 2 | 5 |

| Sheet B | 1 | 2 | 3 | 4 | 5 | 6 | 7 | 8 | Final |
| (Switzerland) Silvana Tirinzoni 🔨 | 1 | 0 | 0 | 0 | 0 | 2 | 0 | X | 3 |
| (Ontario) Rachel Homan | 0 | 1 | 2 | 1 | 1 | 0 | 2 | X | 7 |

| Sheet C | 1 | 2 | 3 | 4 | 5 | 6 | 7 | 8 | Final |
| (Scotland) Rebecca Morrison 🔨 | 0 | 0 | 1 | 1 | 0 | 0 | 1 | 0 | 3 |
| (British Columbia) Clancy Grandy | 0 | 2 | 0 | 0 | 0 | 1 | 0 | 1 | 4 |

| Sheet D | 1 | 2 | 3 | 4 | 5 | 6 | 7 | 8 | Final |
| (Sweden) Anna Hasselborg | 0 | 2 | 0 | 0 | 1 | 2 | 0 | 4 | 9 |
| (Sweden) Isabella Wranå 🔨 | 2 | 0 | 0 | 2 | 0 | 0 | 1 | 0 | 5 |

==== Draw 10 ====
Thursday, December 14, 12:00 pm

| Sheet A | 1 | 2 | 3 | 4 | 5 | 6 | 7 | 8 | Final |
| (Switzerland) Silvana Tirinzoni | 0 | 0 | 3 | 3 | 0 | 1 | 2 | X | 9 |
| (Sweden) Isabella Wranå 🔨 | 0 | 1 | 0 | 0 | 2 | 0 | 0 | X | 3 |

| Sheet B | 1 | 2 | 3 | 4 | 5 | 6 | 7 | 8 | Final |
| (South Korea) Kim Eun-jung | 0 | 0 | 0 | 0 | 3 | 0 | 1 | 1 | 5 |
| (Scotland) Rebecca Morrison 🔨 | 0 | 0 | 0 | 2 | 0 | 2 | 0 | 0 | 4 |

| Sheet C | 1 | 2 | 3 | 4 | 5 | 6 | 7 | 8 | Final |
| (Ontario) Rachel Homan | 0 | 2 | 0 | 0 | 2 | 0 | 0 | 3 | 7 |
| (Sweden) Anna Hasselborg 🔨 | 2 | 0 | 0 | 2 | 0 | 0 | 1 | 0 | 5 |

| Sheet D | 1 | 2 | 3 | 4 | 5 | 6 | 7 | 8 | Final |
| (Manitoba) Kaitlyn Lawes 🔨 | 0 | 4 | 1 | 0 | 2 | 0 | 0 | 2 | 9 |
| (British Columbia) Clancy Grandy | 1 | 0 | 0 | 2 | 0 | 2 | 1 | 0 | 6 |

==== Draw 12 ====
Thursday, December 14, 8:00 pm

| Sheet A | 1 | 2 | 3 | 4 | 5 | 6 | 7 | 8 | Final |
| (Italy) Stefania Constantini | 0 | 0 | 1 | 0 | 1 | X | X | X | 2 |
| (United States) Tabitha Peterson 🔨 | 2 | 1 | 0 | 4 | 0 | X | X | X | 7 |

| Sheet B | 1 | 2 | 3 | 4 | 5 | 6 | 7 | 8 | Final |
| (South Korea) Gim Eun-ji | 1 | 0 | 0 | 3 | 0 | 0 | 3 | X | 7 |
| (Manitoba) Kerri Einarson 🔨 | 0 | 1 | 1 | 0 | 0 | 1 | 0 | X | 3 |

| Sheet C | 1 | 2 | 3 | 4 | 5 | 6 | 7 | 8 | Final |
| (Manitoba) Kate Cameron | 0 | 0 | 0 | 0 | 1 | 0 | 0 | X | 1 |
| (United States) Delaney Strouse 🔨 | 0 | 2 | 1 | 1 | 0 | 1 | 0 | X | 5 |

| Sheet D | 1 | 2 | 3 | 4 | 5 | 6 | 7 | 8 | 9 | Final |
| (Manitoba) Jennifer Jones | 0 | 0 | 1 | 2 | 0 | 1 | 0 | 2 | 0 | 6 |
| (Japan) Satsuki Fujisawa 🔨 | 0 | 3 | 0 | 0 | 1 | 0 | 2 | 0 | 1 | 7 |

==== Draw 13 ====
Friday, December 15, 8:00 am

| Sheet A | 1 | 2 | 3 | 4 | 5 | 6 | 7 | 8 | 9 | Final |
| (Sweden) Anna Hasselborg 🔨 | 0 | 1 | 0 | 0 | 2 | 0 | 0 | 1 | 0 | 4 |
| (Scotland) Rebecca Morrison | 0 | 0 | 0 | 2 | 0 | 2 | 0 | 0 | 1 | 5 |

| Sheet B | 1 | 2 | 3 | 4 | 5 | 6 | 7 | 8 | Final |
| (Sweden) Isabella Wranå 🔨 | 1 | 0 | 1 | 0 | 1 | 2 | 4 | X | 9 |
| (British Columbia) Clancy Grandy | 0 | 2 | 0 | 1 | 0 | 0 | 0 | X | 3 |

| Sheet C | 1 | 2 | 3 | 4 | 5 | 6 | 7 | 8 | 9 | Final |
| (Switzerland) Silvana Tirinzoni 🔨 | 0 | 1 | 0 | 0 | 0 | 0 | 1 | 0 | 1 | 3 |
| (Manitoba) Kaitlyn Lawes | 0 | 0 | 1 | 0 | 0 | 0 | 0 | 1 | 0 | 2 |

| Sheet D | 1 | 2 | 3 | 4 | 5 | 6 | 7 | 8 | 9 | Final |
| (Ontario) Rachel Homan | 0 | 1 | 0 | 2 | 0 | 2 | 0 | 1 | 0 | 6 |
| (South Korea) Kim Eun-jung 🔨 | 1 | 0 | 2 | 0 | 1 | 0 | 2 | 0 | 2 | 8 |

==== Draw 15 ====
Friday, December 15, 3:30 pm

| Sheet A | 1 | 2 | 3 | 4 | 5 | 6 | 7 | 8 | Final |
| (South Korea) Gim Eun-ji | 0 | 1 | 0 | 1 | 0 | 1 | 0 | 1 | 4 |
| (Manitoba) Kate Cameron 🔨 | 1 | 0 | 2 | 0 | 0 | 0 | 2 | 0 | 5 |

| Sheet B | 1 | 2 | 3 | 4 | 5 | 6 | 7 | 8 | 9 | Final |
| (Japan) Satsuki Fujisawa | 0 | 0 | 1 | 0 | 2 | 0 | 1 | 2 | 0 | 6 |
| (United States) Tabitha Peterson 🔨 | 0 | 1 | 0 | 2 | 0 | 3 | 0 | 0 | 2 | 8 |

| Sheet C | 1 | 2 | 3 | 4 | 5 | 6 | 7 | 8 | 9 | Final |
| (Manitoba) Jennifer Jones 🔨 | 4 | 0 | 0 | 0 | 1 | 0 | 2 | 0 | 2 | 9 |
| (Italy) Stefania Constantini | 0 | 1 | 1 | 2 | 0 | 2 | 0 | 1 | 0 | 7 |

| Sheet D | 1 | 2 | 3 | 4 | 5 | 6 | 7 | 8 | Final |
| (Manitoba) Kerri Einarson | 0 | 2 | 0 | 1 | 0 | 1 | 0 | 1 | 5 |
| (United States) Delaney Strouse 🔨 | 1 | 0 | 1 | 0 | 1 | 0 | 1 | 0 | 4 |

=== Tiebreakers ===
Saturday, December 16, 7:00 am

| Sheet A | 1 | 2 | 3 | 4 | 5 | 6 | 7 | 8 | Final |
| (South Korea) Kim Eun-jung | 0 | 0 | 0 | 2 | 0 | 2 | 1 | 0 | 5 |
| (United States) Tabitha Peterson 🔨 | 0 | 2 | 2 | 0 | 1 | 0 | 0 | 1 | 6 |

Player percentages
| (South Korea) Team Kim | | (United States) Team Peterson | |
|---|---|---|---|
| Kim Seon-yeong | 97% | Becca Hamilton | 91% |
| Kim Cho-hi | 91% | Tara Peterson | 98% |
| Kim Kyeong-ae | 91% | Cory Thiesse | 91% |
| Kim Eun-jung | 81% | Tabitha Peterson | 92% |
| Total | 90% | Total | 93% |

| Sheet B | 1 | 2 | 3 | 4 | 5 | 6 | 7 | 8 | Final |
| (Sweden) Anna Hasselborg 🔨 | 2 | 1 | 0 | 3 | 0 | 0 | 1 | X | 7 |
| (United States) Delaney Strouse | 0 | 0 | 1 | 0 | 1 | 0 | 0 | X | 2 |

Player percentages
| (Sweden) Team Hasselborg | | (United States) Team Strouse | |
|---|---|---|---|
| Sofia Mabergs | 91% | Rebecca Rodgers | 86% |
| Agnes Knochenhauer | 91% | Sydney Mullaney | 79% |
| Sara McManus | 84% | Anne O'Hara | 73% |
| Anna Hasselborg | 91% | Delaney Strouse | 57% |
| Total | 89% | Total | 74% |

| Sheet D | 1 | 2 | 3 | 4 | 5 | 6 | 7 | 8 | Final |
| (Sweden) Isabella Wranå | 1 | 3 | 0 | 2 | 1 | 1 | X | X | 8 |
| (Japan) Satsuki Fujisawa 🔨 | 0 | 0 | 2 | 0 | 0 | 0 | X | X | 2 |

Player percentages
| (Sweden) Team Wranå | | (Japan) Team Fujisawa | |
|---|---|---|---|
| Linda Stenlund | 96% | Yurika Yoshida | 96% |
| Maria Larsson | 77% | Yumi Suzuki | 69% |
| Almida de Val | 75% | Chinami Yoshida | 77% |
| Isabella Wranå | 85% | Satsuki Fujisawa | 58% |
| Total | 83% | Total | 75% |

=== Playoffs ===
Quarterfinals
1 | (Switzerland) Silvana Tirinzoni | 5
8 | (United States) Tabitha Peterson | 3
4 | (South Korea) Gim Eun-ji | 4
5 | (Manitoba) Kerri Einarson | 6
2 | (Manitoba) Jennifer Jones | 5
7 | (Sweden) Anna Hasselborg | 3
3 | (Ontario) Rachel Homan | 8
6 | (Sweden) Isabella Wranå | 3

Semifinals
1 | (Switzerland) Silvana Tirinzoni | 6
5 | (Manitoba) Kerri Einarson | 3
2 | (Manitoba) Jennifer Jones | 4
3 | (Ontario) Rachel Homan | 8

Final
1 | (Switzerland) Silvana Tirinzoni | 4
3 | (Ontario) Rachel Homan | 8

==== Quarterfinals ====
Saturday, December 16, 10:30 am

| Sheet A | 1 | 2 | 3 | 4 | 5 | 6 | 7 | 8 | Final |
| (Manitoba) Jennifer Jones 🔨 | 1 | 0 | 2 | 0 | 0 | 0 | 1 | 1 | 5 |
| (Sweden) Anna Hasselborg | 0 | 2 | 0 | 0 | 0 | 1 | 0 | 0 | 3 |

Player percentages
| (Manitoba) Team Jones | | (Sweden) Team Hasselborg | |
|---|---|---|---|
| Lauren Lenentine | 81% | Sofia Mabergs | 89% |
| Emily Zacharias | 94% | Agnes Knochenhauer | 84% |
| Karlee Burgess | 83% | Sara McManus | 88% |
| Jennifer Jones | 91% | Anna Hasselborg | 83% |
| Total | 87% | Total | 86% |

| Sheet B | 1 | 2 | 3 | 4 | 5 | 6 | 7 | 8 | Final |
| (Ontario) Rachel Homan 🔨 | 2 | 0 | 3 | 0 | 3 | 0 | X | X | 8 |
| (Sweden) Isabella Wranå | 0 | 1 | 0 | 1 | 0 | 1 | X | X | 3 |

Player percentages
| (Ontario) Team Homan | | (Sweden) Team Wranå | |
|---|---|---|---|
| Sarah Wilkes | 98% | Linda Stenlund | 100% |
| Emma Miskew | 88% | Maria Larsson | 73% |
| Tracy Fleury | 90% | Almida de Val | 63% |
| Rachel Homan | 96% | Isabella Wranå | 69% |
| Total | 93% | Total | 76% |

| Sheet C | 1 | 2 | 3 | 4 | 5 | 6 | 7 | 8 | Final |
| (South Korea) Gim Eun-ji 🔨 | 2 | 0 | 2 | 0 | 0 | 0 | 0 | 0 | 4 |
| (Manitoba) Kerri Einarson | 0 | 1 | 0 | 1 | 1 | 1 | 1 | 1 | 6 |

Player percentages
| (South Korea) Team Gim | | (Manitoba) Team Einarson | |
|---|---|---|---|
| Seol Ye-eun | 98% | Briane Harris | 94% |
| Kim Su-ji | 89% | Shannon Birchard | 94% |
| Kim Min-ji | 73% | Val Sweeting | 90% |
| Gim Eun-ji | 72% | Kerri Einarson | 75% |
| Total | 83% | Total | 88% |

| Sheet D | 1 | 2 | 3 | 4 | 5 | 6 | 7 | 8 | Final |
| (Switzerland) Silvana Tirinzoni 🔨 | 2 | 0 | 2 | 0 | 0 | 1 | 0 | X | 5 |
| (United States) Tabitha Peterson | 0 | 1 | 0 | 0 | 1 | 0 | 1 | X | 3 |

Player percentages
| (Switzerland) Team Tirinzoni | | (United States) Team Peterson | |
|---|---|---|---|
| Carole Howald | 84% | Becca Hamilton | 97% |
| Selina Witschonke | 86% | Tara Peterson | 77% |
| Silvana Tirinzoni | 94% | Cory Thiesse | 91% |
| Alina Pätz | 93% | Tabitha Peterson | 90% |
| Total | 89% | Total | 88% |

==== Semifinals ====
Saturday, December 16, 6:30 pm

| Sheet B | 1 | 2 | 3 | 4 | 5 | 6 | 7 | 8 | Final |
| (Switzerland) Silvana Tirinzoni 🔨 | 0 | 0 | 0 | 2 | 0 | 1 | 0 | 3 | 6 |
| (Manitoba) Kerri Einarson | 0 | 0 | 0 | 0 | 1 | 0 | 2 | 0 | 3 |

Player percentages
| (Switzerland) Team Tirinzoni | | (Manitoba) Team Einarson | |
|---|---|---|---|
| Carole Howald | 89% | Briane Harris | 98% |
| Selina Witschonke | 97% | Shannon Birchard | 95% |
| Silvana Tirinzoni | 89% | Val Sweeting | 92% |
| Alina Pätz | 92% | Kerri Einarson | 94% |
| Total | 92% | Total | 95% |

| Sheet D | 1 | 2 | 3 | 4 | 5 | 6 | 7 | 8 | Final |
| (Manitoba) Jennifer Jones 🔨 | 1 | 0 | 0 | 2 | 0 | 1 | 0 | X | 4 |
| (Ontario) Rachel Homan | 0 | 2 | 1 | 0 | 4 | 0 | 1 | X | 8 |

Player percentages
| (Manitoba) Team Jones | | (Ontario) Team Homan | |
|---|---|---|---|
| Lauren Lenentine | 84% | Sarah Wilkes | 89% |
| Emily Zacharias | 68% | Emma Miskew | 79% |
| Karlee Burgess | 80% | Tracy Fleury | 82% |
| Jennifer Jones | 65% | Rachel Homan | 89% |
| Total | 75% | Total | 85% |

==== Final ====
Sunday, December 17, 10:30 am

| Sheet B | 1 | 2 | 3 | 4 | 5 | 6 | 7 | 8 | Final |
| (Switzerland) Silvana Tirinzoni 🔨 | 0 | 1 | 0 | 1 | 0 | 2 | 0 | X | 4 |
| (Ontario) Rachel Homan | 0 | 0 | 4 | 0 | 1 | 0 | 3 | X | 8 |

Player percentages
| (Switzerland) Team Tirinzoni | | (Ontario) Team Homan | |
|---|---|---|---|
| Carole Howald | 93% | Sarah Wilkes | 80% |
| Selina Witschonke | 82% | Emma Miskew | 79% |
| Silvana Tirinzoni | 80% | Tracy Fleury | 84% |
| Alina Pätz | 79% | Rachel Homan | 88% |
| Total | 84% | Total | 83% |
