= Martina Mašková =

Czech ice hockey player

- Born: 15 February 1998 (age 28) Ústí nad Labem, Czech Republic
- Height: 1.63 m (5 ft 4 in)
- Weight: 64 kg (141 lb; 10 st 1 lb)
- Position: Forward
- Shoots: Left
- GPT team: Regina Cougars
- National team: Czech Republic
- Playing career: 2017–present
Medal record
Women's ball hockey
Representing Czech Republic
World University Games
Bronze medal – third place	2023 Lake Placid	Ice hockey

Martina Mašková (born 15 February 1998) is a Czech ice hockey player for the Regina Cougars and the Czech national team. She represented the Czech Republic at the 2019 IIHF Women's World Championship.
