= Kendra Woodland =

Canadian ice hockey player (born 2000)

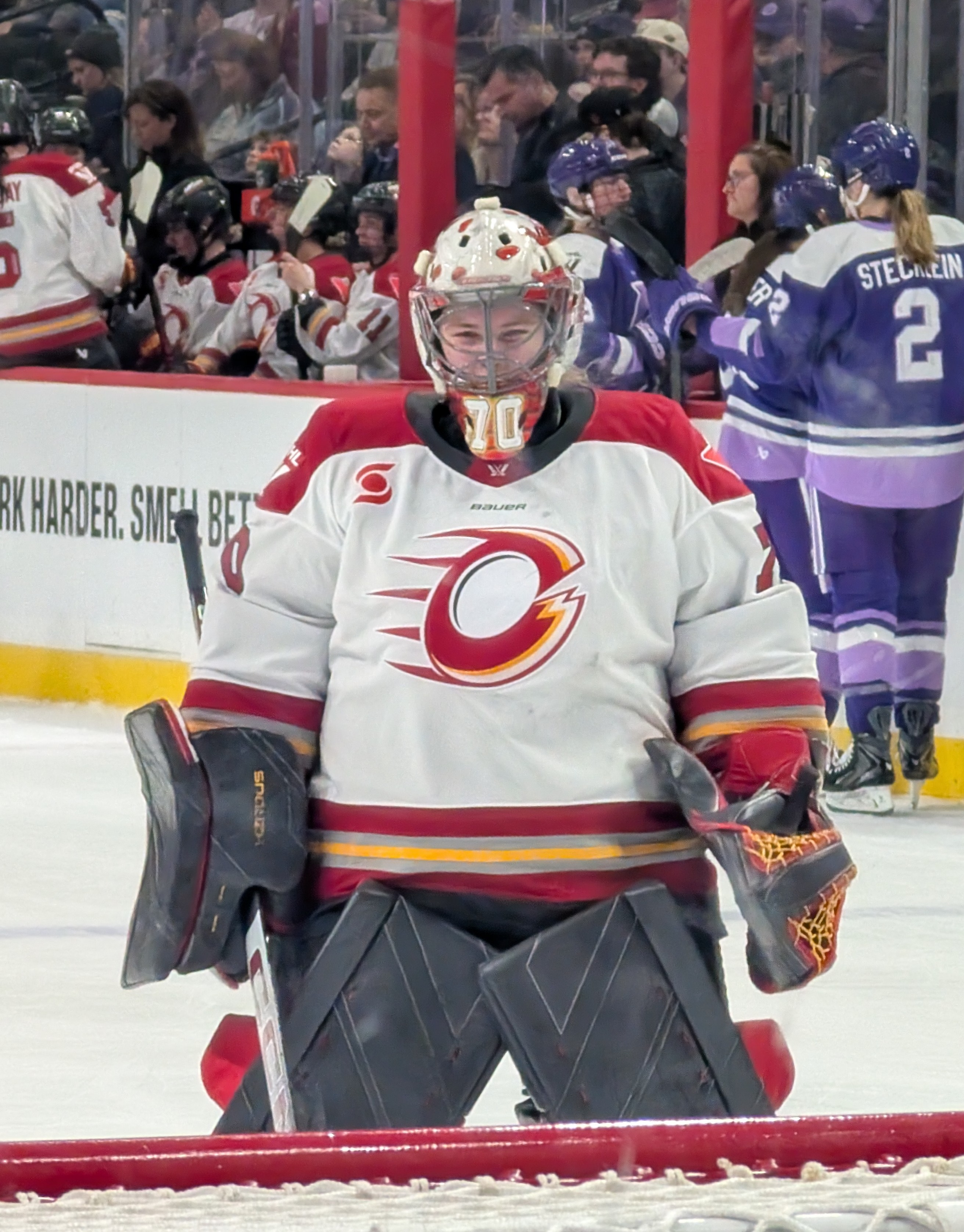
- Woodland with the Ottawa Charge
- Born: February 18, 2000 (age 26) Kamloops, British Columbia, Canada
- Height: 5 ft 8 in (173 cm)
- Position: Goaltender
- Catches: Left
- PWHL team: Ottawa Charge
- Playing career: 2018–present
Medal record
World University Games
Gold medal – first place	2023 Lake Placid	Ice hockey

Kendra Woodland (born February 18, 2000) is a Canadian professional ice hockey goaltender for the Ottawa Charge of the Professional Women's Hockey League (PWHL). She played university hockey at the University of New Brunswick.

== Playing career ==
Woodland attended the University of New Brunswick where she played ice hockey for the UNB Reds. During the 2018–19 season, she appeared in 23 regular season games, and posted a 9–12–0 record, with a 1.73 goals against average (GAA), and .945 save percentage. Following the season she was named a first team all-star, a member of the all-rookie team, and the AUS Rookie of the Year.

During the 2022–23 season, she appeared in 17 regular season games, and posted a 14–3–0 record, with a 1.10 GAA, and .960 save percentage. She helped lead UNB to their second straight AUS title. She led the country in save percentage and ranked fourth in GAA. Following the season she was named the an AUS first team all-star and the Player of the Year.

After going undrafted in the 2024 and 2025 PWHL Drafts, Woodland was invited to the Ottawa Charge's training camp held in November 2025. On November 20, 2025, she signed a one-year contract with the Charge for the 2025–26 season. She will become the first UNB alum to play in the PWHL.

== International play ==
Woodland represented Canada at the 2023 Winter World University Games. During the tournament she appeared in four games, posted a 0.25 GAA, a 0.984 save percentage, with three shutouts, and won a gold medal.

== Career statistics ==
=== Regular season and playoffs ===
			Regular season									Playoffs
Season	Team	League	GP	W	L	OTL	MIN	GA	SO	GAA	SV%	GP	W	L	MIN	GA	SO	GAA	SV%
2018–19	UNB	U Sports	23	9	12	0	1355	39	–	1.73	.945	4	2	2	238	8	–	2.02	.934
2019–20	UNB	U Sports	18	8	10	0	1067	35	–	1.97	.935	5	2	3	316	6	–	1.14	.966
2021–22	UNB	U Sports	16	11	5	0	974	26	–	1.60	.937	5	5	0	307	6	–	1.17	.959
2022–23	UNB	U Sports	17	14	3	0	1033	19	–	1.10	.960	7	5	2	429	10	–	1.40	.952
2023–24	UNB	U Sports	16	11	5	0	965	32	–	1.99	.926	6	5	1	405	6	–	0.89	.970
2025–26	Ottawa Charge	PWHL	1	0	0	0	45	2	0	2.66	.875	—	—	—	—	—	—	—	—
PWHL totals			1	0	0	0	45	2	0	2.66	.875	—	—	—	—	—	—	—	—

== Awards and honours ==
- 2018-19 AUS Rookie of the Year
- 2022-23 AUS Most Valuable Player
- 2018-19 AUS First Team All-Star
- 2019-20 AUS Second Team All-Star
- 2021-22 AUS First Team All-Star
- 2022-23 AUS First Team All-Star
- 2018-19 AUS Rookie Team All-Star
- 2023 Brodrick Trophy
- 2018-19 USPORTS All-Rookie Team
- 2022-23 USPORTS First Team All-Canadian
