= Saskatchewan Huskies women's ice hockey =

- University: University of Saskatchewan
- Conference: Canada West
- Head coach: Steve Kook; Since 2005-06 season
- Arena: Merlis Belsher Place; Saskatoon, Saskatchewan
- Colors: Green, white, and black

U Sports tournament appearances
- 2004, 2014, 2018, 2022, 2024

Conference tournament champions
- 2014

The Saskatchewan Huskies women's ice hockey team represents the University of Saskatchewan in U Sports women's ice hockey. The Huskies compete in the Canada West Universities Athletic Association Conference in the U Sports athletic association. Home games are contested at the Merlis Belsher Place.

== History ==
Women have been playing hockey at the University as early as 1912. During the 2009–10 season, Breanne George scored a conference-high 28 goals and 18 assists for a league-leading 46 points in 24 games. Fifth-year Huskies forward Julie Paetsch was named the 2011–12 Canada West women’s hockey Player of the Year. The Huskies alternate captain, Paetsch finished the season as the Canada West leader in scoring with 34 points. Her 14 goals and 20 assists were accumulated in 24 games as the Huskies enjoyed a won-loss record of 16–6–2. Her seven power play goals ranked third overall in the CIS, while her 113 shots led all CIS skaters. In ten contests, she had multiple point games, while logging three or more points on four separate occasions. It marked the second time in Saskatchewan history that a skater has been named Canada West MVP. Breanne George claimed the award in 2009–10.

Kelsey Tulloch was the 2012 Canada West nominee for the Marion Hilliard Award. She accumulated eight points as the Huskies qualified for their fifth consecutive playoff appearance. Tulloch was named a four-time All-Academic, while representing her team on the Huskie Athletics Council.

=== U Sports Tournament results ===
Year	Seed	Round	Opponent	Result
2004	#5	Pool A, Game 1 Pool A, Game 2 Bronze Medal Game	#2 Laurier #3 Ottawa #4 McGill	W 1–0 (OT); L 6–2; L 1–0
2014	#4	Pool A, Game 1 Pool A, Game 2 Bronze Medal Game	#1 Montreal #6 St. Thomas #2 Laurier	L 3–0; W 3–2; W 6–3
2018	#7	Quarter-Finals; Semi-Finals; Bronze Medal Game	#2 Saint Mary’s #3 Western #4 Concordia	W 3–2; L 2–1; L 4–2
2022	#5	Quarter-Finals; Semi-Finals; Bronze Medal Game	#4 Brock #1 Concordia #2 UNB	W 4–0; L 2–0; W 2–0
2024	#8	Quarter-Finals; Semi-Finals; Fifth Place Game	#1 Concordia #5 St. FX #2 UBC	L 4–0; W 3–1; L 2–0

== Awards and honours ==
- Breanne George, 2010 Canada West scoring champion

=== University Awards ===
- 2008 Colb McEwon Trophy (Saskatchewan Huskies Athletics Coach of the Year): Steve Kook and Wayne Grund
- 2014 Colb McEwon Trophy (Saskatchewan Huskies Athletics Coach of the Year): Steve Kook
- 2020 Patricia Lawson Trophy (awarded to Huskies Female Rookie of the Year): Halle Krynowsky

=== Canada West All-Stars ===
Season	Player	Honour
1998–99	Joanna Mould	Second team
1998–99	Gwen Bramwell	Second team
2000–01	Beckie Bailey	Second team
2001–02	Laurie Blair	Second team
2001–02	Robin Nuttall	Second team
2002–03	Misty Bertam	First team
2002–03	Beckie Bailey	Second team
2003–04	Laurie Alexander	Second Team
2007–08	Robin Ulrich	First team
2007–08	Vanessa Frederick	Second team
2008–09	Robin Ulrich	Second team
2008–09	Breanne George	Second team
2008–09	Danny Stone	All-Freshman Team
2009–10	Breanne George	First Team
2009–10	Julie Paetsch	Second Team
2010–11	Breanne George	First team
2010–11	Cara Wooster	Second team
2010–11	Kristin Bews	Second team
2017–18	Jessica Vance, Goaltender	First team
2017–18	Kaitlin Willoughby, Forward	Second Team
2023–24	Sophie Lalor, Forward	Second Team
2023–24	Camryn Drever, Goalie	First Team

=== Canada West All-Rookie Team ===
Season	Player	Position
2019–20	Halle Krynowsky	Defense

=== Canada West awards ===
Season	Award	Winner
2002–03	Rookie of the Year	Erin McKay
2002–03	Canada West Marion Hilliard Award	Misty Bertram
2007–08	Canada West Marion Hilliard Award	Robin Ulrich
2007–08	Coach of the Year	Steve Kook
2009–10	Most Valuable Player	Breanne George
2009–10	Canada West Coach of the Year	Steve Kook
2013–14	Canada West Coach of the Year	Steve Kook
2013–14	Rookie of the Year	Kaitlin Willoughby
2017–18	Most Valuable Player	Jessica Vance
2023–24	Canada West Goaltender of the Year	Camryn Drever
2023–24	Most Valuable Player	Camryn Drever

=== U Sports honours ===
- 2007, 2009, 2010 Canadian Interuniversity Sport Academic All-Canadian, Chelsea Purcell
- 2008 University of Saskatchewan Huskies Women's Hockey Alumni Award, Chelsea Purcell
- Breanne George, 2010 CIS MVP
- 2010 CIS First Team, Forward, Breanne George
- 2010 CIS Second Team, Julie Paetsch
- 2011 CIS First Team, Forward, Breanne George
- Julie Paetsch, CIS First Team All-Star (2011–12)
- Julia Flinton 2015-16 U Sports First Team All-Canadian
- Kaitlin Willoughby, 2018 U SPORTS Women’s Hockey Championship Tournament All-Star Team

== Notable alumni ==
- Sylvia Fedoruk: 17th Lieutenant Governor of Saskatchewan
- Shannon Miller: Head Coach for Canada in Ice hockey at the 1998 Winter Olympics – Women's tournament

=== International ===
- Breanne George, Forward : Canada 2011 Winter Universiade (gold)
- Julia Flinton Canada: 2015 Winter Universiade (silver)
- Kaitlin Willoughby, Forward, Canada: 2017 Winter Universiade (silver)
- Leah Bohlken, Forward, Canada: 2019 Winter Universiade
- Jessica Vance, Goaltender, Canada: Ice hockey at the 2019 Winter Universiade (silver)

=== Huskies in professional hockey ===
= CWHL All-Star	= NWHL All-Star	= Clarkson Cup Champion	= Isobel Cup Champion

Player	Position	Team(s)	League(s)	Years	Titles
Julie Paetsch	Forward	Calgary Inferno	CWHL	1	
Chelsea Purcell	Forward	Edmonton Chimos; Team Alberta Team captain Aisulu Almaty	WWHL; CWHL; EWHL	6	2018 Clarkson Cup as general manager
Danielle Stone	Forward	Calgary Inferno; Sundsvall/Timrå; Riksserien; Brynäs IF; Leksands IF; HV71	CWHL; SDHL	7	
Kaitlin Willoughby	Forward	Calgary Inferno; Dream Gap Tour; Toronto Sceptres	CWHL; PWHPA; PWHL	7	2019 Clarkson Cup
