= Grace Elliott (ice hockey) =

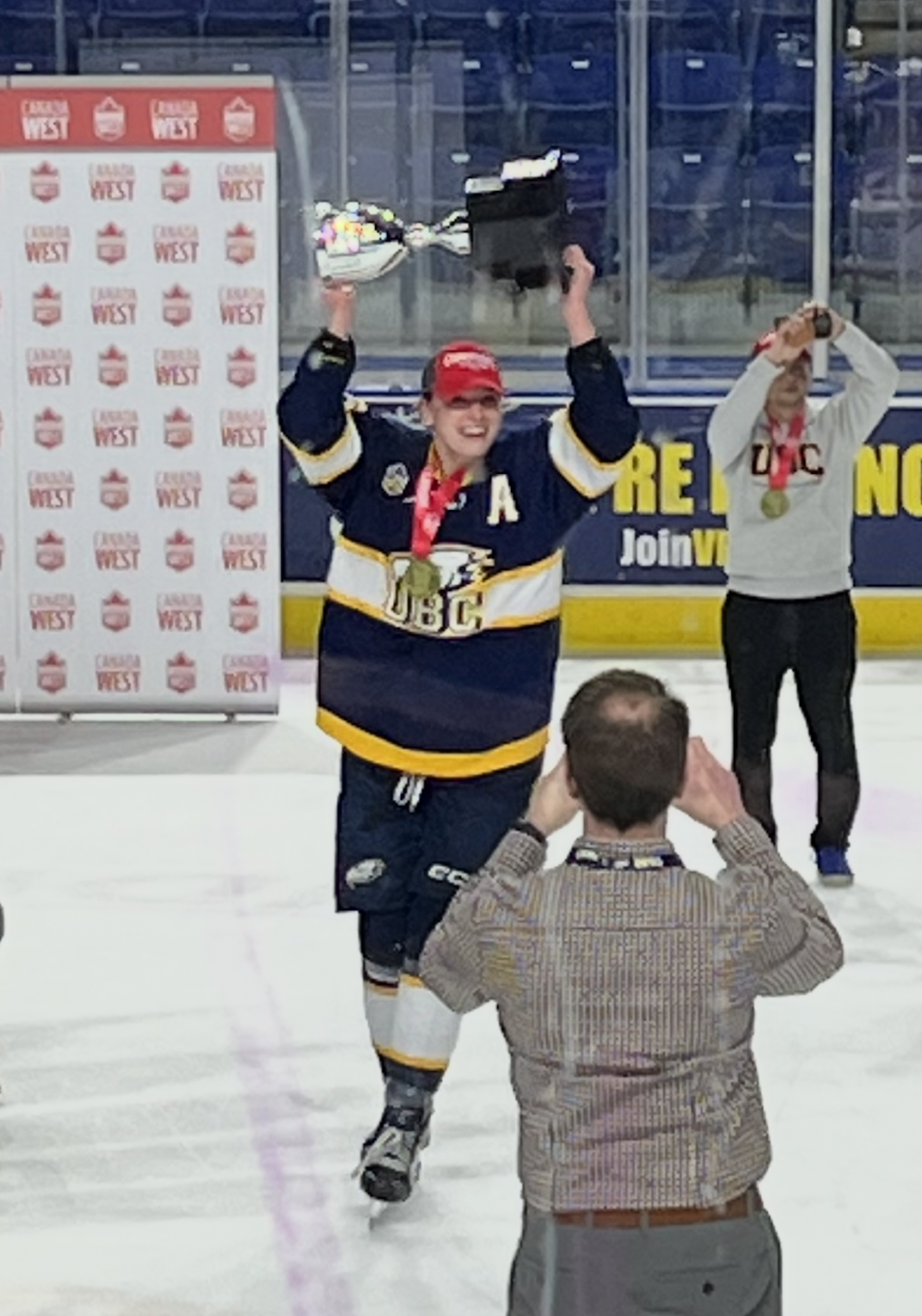
- Grace Elliott hoisting the trophy for the Canada West ice hockey championship
- Born: June 19, 2003 (age 23) Cloverdale, Surrey, British Columbia
- Height: 6 ft 2 in (188 cm)
- Position: Forward
- Shoots: Left
- PWHL team: Seattle Torrent
- Playing career: 2026–present

Grace Elliott (June 19, 2003) is a professional ice hockey forward drafted by the Seattle Torrent of the Professional Women's Hockey League. She played university ice hockey with the UBC Thunderbirds, and was drafted thirty eighth overall in the 2026 PWHL Draft.

== Playing career ==
Elliott became the first player in Thunderbirds program history to win the Canada West Player of the Year Award in consecutive seasons. In 2026, Elliott won the Canada West scoring title, recording 37 points. She set the conference record for most game winning goals in a career with 25.

== Career statistics ==
			Regular season					Playoffs
Season	Team	League	GP	G	A	Pts	PIM	GP	G	A	Pts	PIM
2021–22	UBC Thunderbirds	CW	18	4	5	9	16	4	2	0	2	0
2022–23	UBC Thunderbirds	CW	27	12	11	23	36	6	1	1	2	8
2023–24	UBC Thunderbirds	CW	28	13	8	21	28	6	2	2	4	4
2024–25	UBC Thunderbirds	CW	28	22	20	42	38	—	—	—	—	—
2025–26	UBC Thunderbirds	CW	28	24	13	37	44	4	1	1	2	2
CW totals			129	75	57	132	152	20	6	4	10	14

== Awards and honours ==
- Brodrick Trophy (2024-25)
- Canada West Player of the Year (2024-25, 2025-26)
- USports First Team All-Canadian (2024-25, 2025-26)
