= Kelly-Ann Nadeau =

Canadian ice hockey player (born 1998)

- Born: March 30, 1998 (age 28) Mont-Laurier, Quebec, Canada
- Height: 5 ft 7 in (170 cm)
- Weight: 150 lb (68 kg; 10 st 10 lb)
- Position: Defence
- Shoots: Right
- PWHL team: Montreal Victoire
- Playing career: 2025–present
Medal record
World University Games
Gold medal – first place	2023 Lake Placid	Ice hockey

Kelly-Ann Nadeau (born March 30, 1998) is a Canadian professional ice hockey defenceman for the Montreal Victoire of the Professional Women's Hockey League (PWHL). She played college ice hockey at the Université de Montréal.

== Playing career ==
Nadeau attended the Université de Montréal where she played ice hockey for the Montreal Carabins for five seasons. During the 2023–24 season, she recorded five goals and ten assists in 25 regular season games. Following the season she was named a U Sports Second Team All-Canadian and a First Team RSEQ All-Star.

Following pre-season training camp, Nadeau was named to the reserve list of the Montreal Victoire for the 2024–25 season. On February 14, 2025, she signed a standard player agreement with the Victoire, after Catherine Dubois was placed on the injured reserve list. She made her professional debut the next day in a game against the New York Sirens, where she recorded one hit in six minutes of ice time. She became the third player to play in the PWHL directly out of U Sports, following Rylind MacKinnon and Emmy Fecteau.

== International play ==
On December 13, 2022, Nadeau was selected to represent Canada at the 2023 Winter World University Games. During the tournament she recorded two goals and three assists in seven games and won a gold medal. Her five points were the third most by a defender during the competition.

== Career statistics ==
			Regular season					Playoffs
Season	Team	League	GP	G	A	Pts	PIM	GP	G	A	Pts	PIM
2018–19	Université de Montréal	RSEQ	20	0	6	6	10	4	0	3	3	2
2019–20	Université de Montréal	RSEQ	19	1	3	4	12	5	0	2	2	2
2021–22	Université de Montréal	RSEQ	15	1	5	6	12	5	1	1	2	6
2022–23	Université de Montréal	RSEQ	22	4	5	9	12	6	0	4	4	0
2023–24	Université de Montréal	RSEQ	25	5	10	15	12	6	0	3	3	6
2024–25	Montreal Victoire	PWHL	4	0	0	0	0	—	—	—	—	—
PWHL totals			4	0	0	0	0	—	—	—	—	—
