= McGill Martlets ice hockey =

Canadian college women's ice hockey team

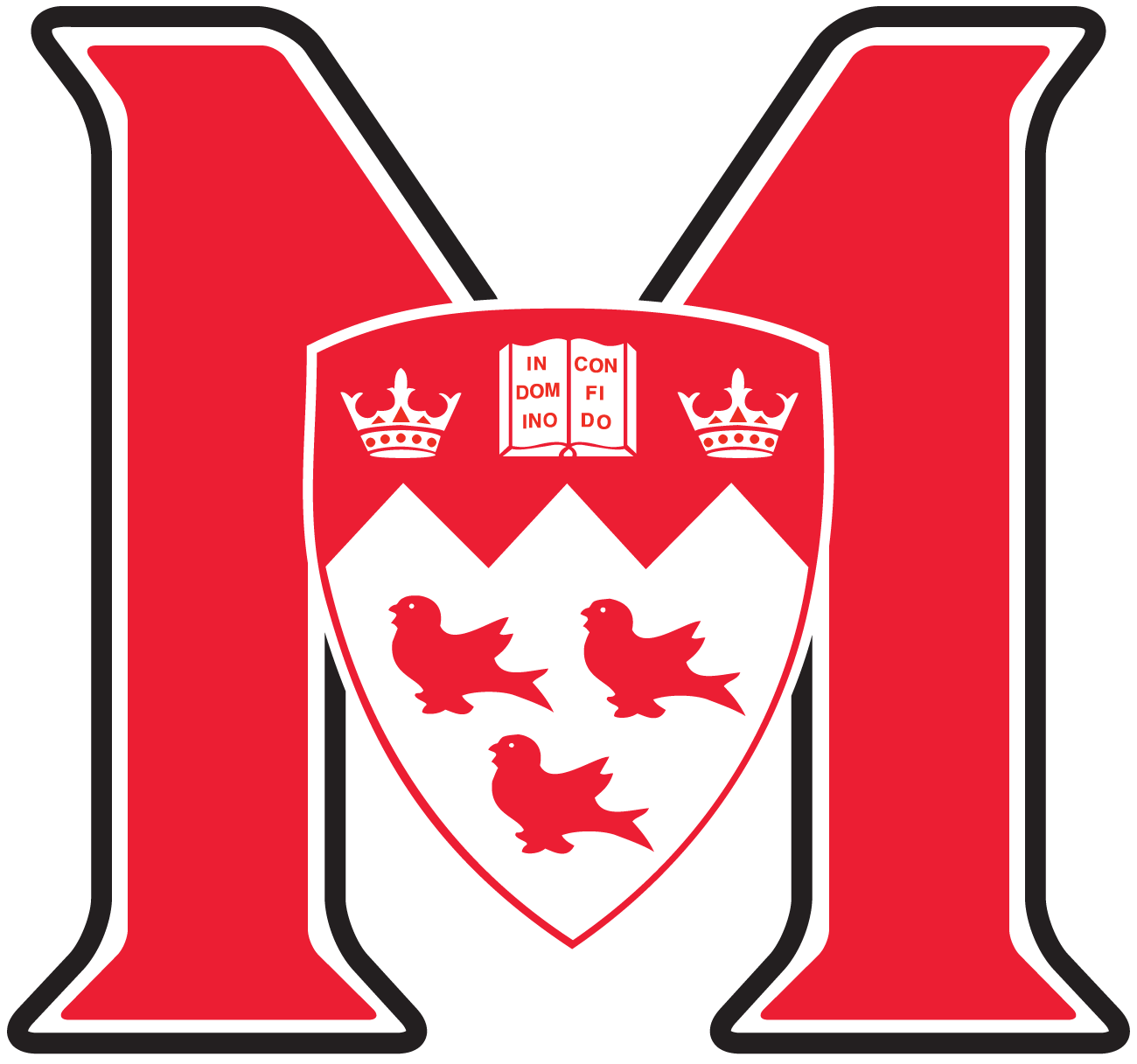
- University: McGill University
- Conference: RSEQ
- Head coach: Alyssa Cecere → since 2020–21 season
- Assistant coaches: Kayla Tutino; Stewart McCarthey; Michelle Daigneault
- Captain(s): Meg Harley (2023–24)
- Arena: Place Bell; Laval, Quebec
- Colors: Red, white, and black

U Sports tournament champions
- 2008, 2009, 2011, 2014

U Sports tournament appearances
- 1999, 2000, 2001, 2003, 2004, 2005, 2006, 2007, 2008, 2009, 2010, 2011, 2012, 2014, 2015, 2016, 2017, 2019, 2020, 2022

Conference tournament champions
- 1985, 2003, 2006, 2007, 2008, 2009, 2010, 2011, 2012, 2015, 2017, 2020

Conference regular season champions
- 2003, 2006, 2007, 2008, 2009, 2010, 2011, 2012, 2013, 2014, 2015, 2017, 2022

The McGill Martlets ice hockey team represents McGill University, based in Montreal, Quebec in U Sports women's ice hockey. They are members of the Réseau du sport étudiant du Québec (RSEQ) and have won four U Sports women's ice hockey championships. Some players have participated internationally, including in the World Student Games. Home games are played at McConnell Arena.

== Origin name ==
The origin of name "Martlet" is used in reference to the coat of arms of McGill University, which includes three birds. These birds were originally a part of the family crest of James McGill, founder of the university. The McGill Martlet Foundation, created in 1954, uses this heraldic symbol. The foundation is a philanthropic organization aimed at helping student athletes at McGill. In 1976, various women's teams at McGill University adopted the use of the name "Martlets".

== History ==
Since 1896, women's ice hockey has existed at McGill University. In the early years of ice hockey play at McGill University, women dressed in long skirts and males were not allowed to attend. The only exceptions were the referee and the arena employees who guarded the main entrance. The ban was lifted a few years later.

The McGill women's ice hockey team participated in the first Women Provincial Ontario Championship in 1914. The university league was dissolved in 1933. From 1936 to 1948, followed by the time period of 1951 to 1960, there was no competition in the Women Interuniversity Athletics Union (WIAU).

A renewal began in the 1960s. In 1963, David Kerr, a male member of the McGill Redmen, agreed to assist in the revival of the McGill women's ice hockey team. In 2006, Kerr and his wife Sheryl Drysdale (the couple met at McGill) donated $1 million for the hockey program. It is the largest donation ever made for a female sporting program in Canadian university history. The donation allowed the team's trainers to assume a full-time role with the team. In addition, the team was able to employ a scout for the Martlets in the recruitment of collegial players in Quebec.

Despite winning the 1985 Quebec Championship, the Martlets only managed to reach the qualifying rounds only once in the next 13 years. A turnaround for the Martlets began with the arrival of goalkeeper Kim St-Pierre in 1998. Her performance during four seasons helped Martlets become competitive in the Quebec Student Sports Federation, while qualifying for the playoff rounds of the Canadian Interuniversity Sport women's ice hockey championship. Martlets goaltender Kim St. Pierre also played a game for the McGill Redmen. She was the first woman in Canadian Interuniversity Sports history to win a men's regular season game when McGill University defeated Ryerson University on November 15, 2003, by a score of 5–2. Overall, the Martlets have won ten QSSF championships and three Canadian Interuniversity Sport women's ice hockey championship.

=== 2006 and beyond ===
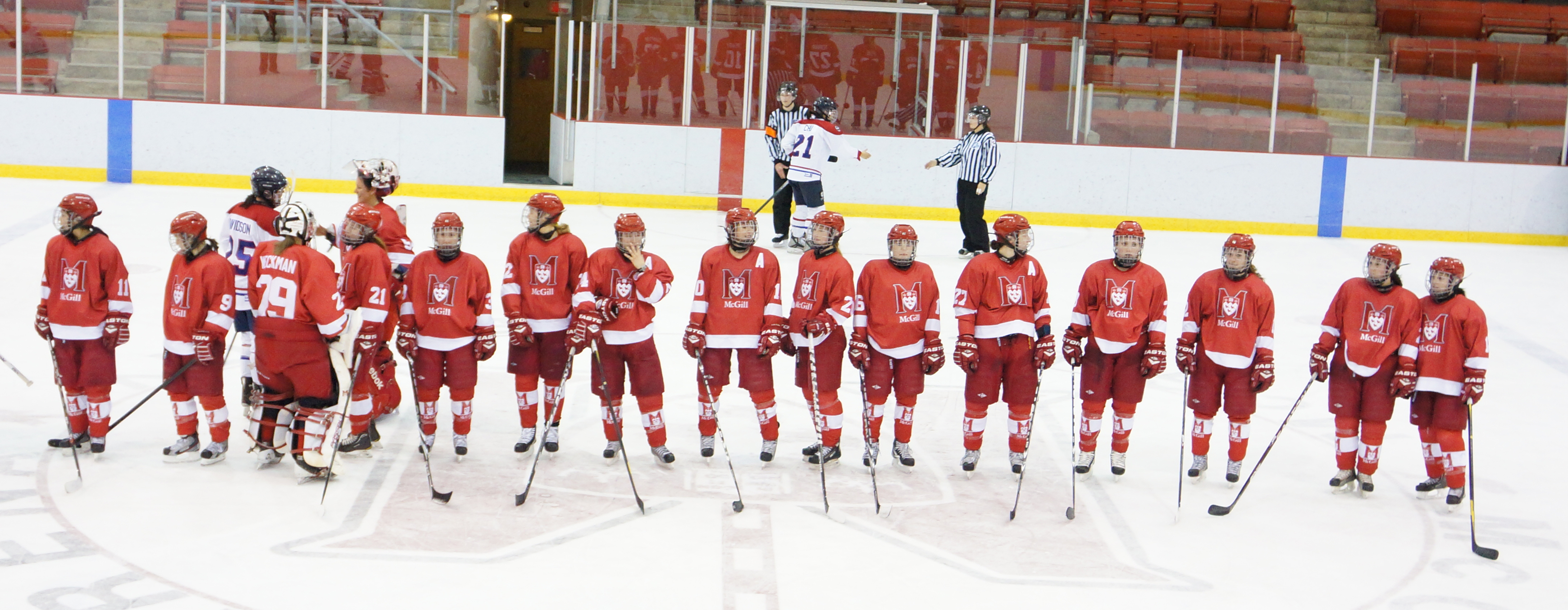
McGill Martlets lined up at centre ice in 2011

During the 2006–07 CIS season, the Martlets were ranked as the number one university team for the duration of the entire season. At the end of season, the Martlets were crowned Quebec champions and awarded a silver medal in the Canadian championships. In the CIS final, the Martlets were defeated by a 4–0 score versus the Alberta Pandas women's ice hockey club. Of note, 9 of their 21 players were rookies. The following season (2007–08), the Martlets enjoyed an undefeated season, with 33 wins. In the 2008 postseason, the Martlets (with a record of 7 victories, 0 defeats), claimed the national title on March 10, 2008, in Ottawa, with a 2–0 victory against the Laurier Golden Hawks women's ice hockey program.

At the end of the 2008–09 season, the Martlets were the national women's champions for the second consecutive year. In a rematch of the previous final, the Martlets defeat the Laurier Golden Hawks women's ice hockey team by a score of 3–1. The streak ended in the 2009–10 season, the Martlets appeared in the 2010 championship game, but were defeated by the Alberta Pandas by a 2–0 tally. Goaltender Charline Labonte and head coach Peter Smith were not with the club as they participated in the 2010 Vancouver Winter Games.

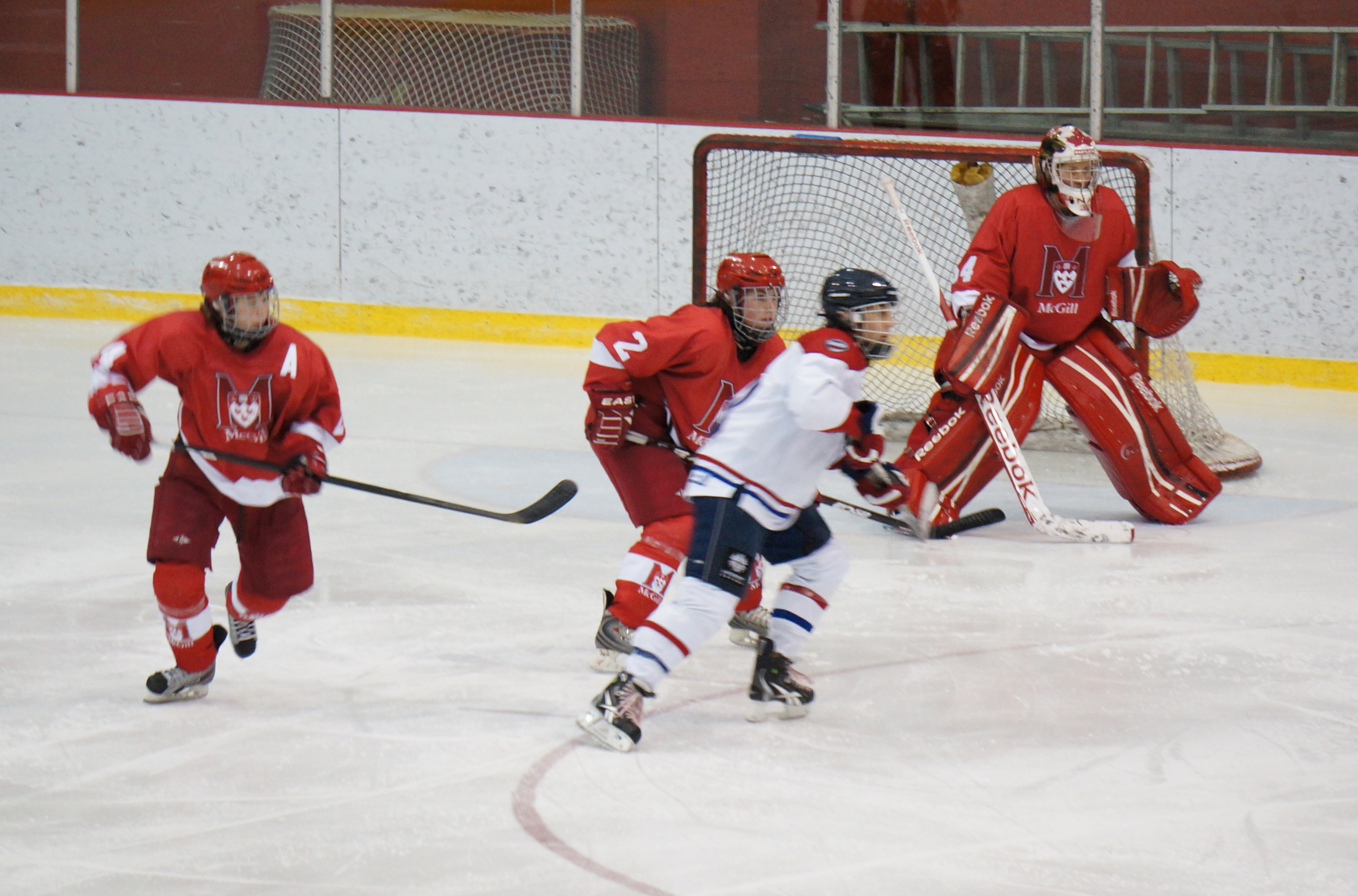
McGill Martlets' in action during a 2012 game

In the 2010–11 season, the Martlets won the QSSF and CIS titles. In addition, the Martlets enjoy another undefeated season with 33 victories and no losses. With their third Canadian championship in four years, the McGill Martlets hockey team become the most decorated in the history of McGill University. On October 1, 2011, the Martlets defeated the Vermont Catamounts women's ice hockey program by a 3–2 tally. With the win, coach Peter Smith earned the 300th victory of his coaching career. Twenty-eight days later (on October 29, 2011), Montreal Carabins women's ice hockey skater Ariane Barker scored with 71 seconds left to give the squad a 3–2 win at McConnell Arena. Martlets goaltender Charline Labonte took the loss for the Martlets, giving her a 69–2 overall record in her CIS career. It marked the Martlets first loss to a Quebec conference opponent for the first time in 108 games.

== The Martlets and Montreal Hockey ==
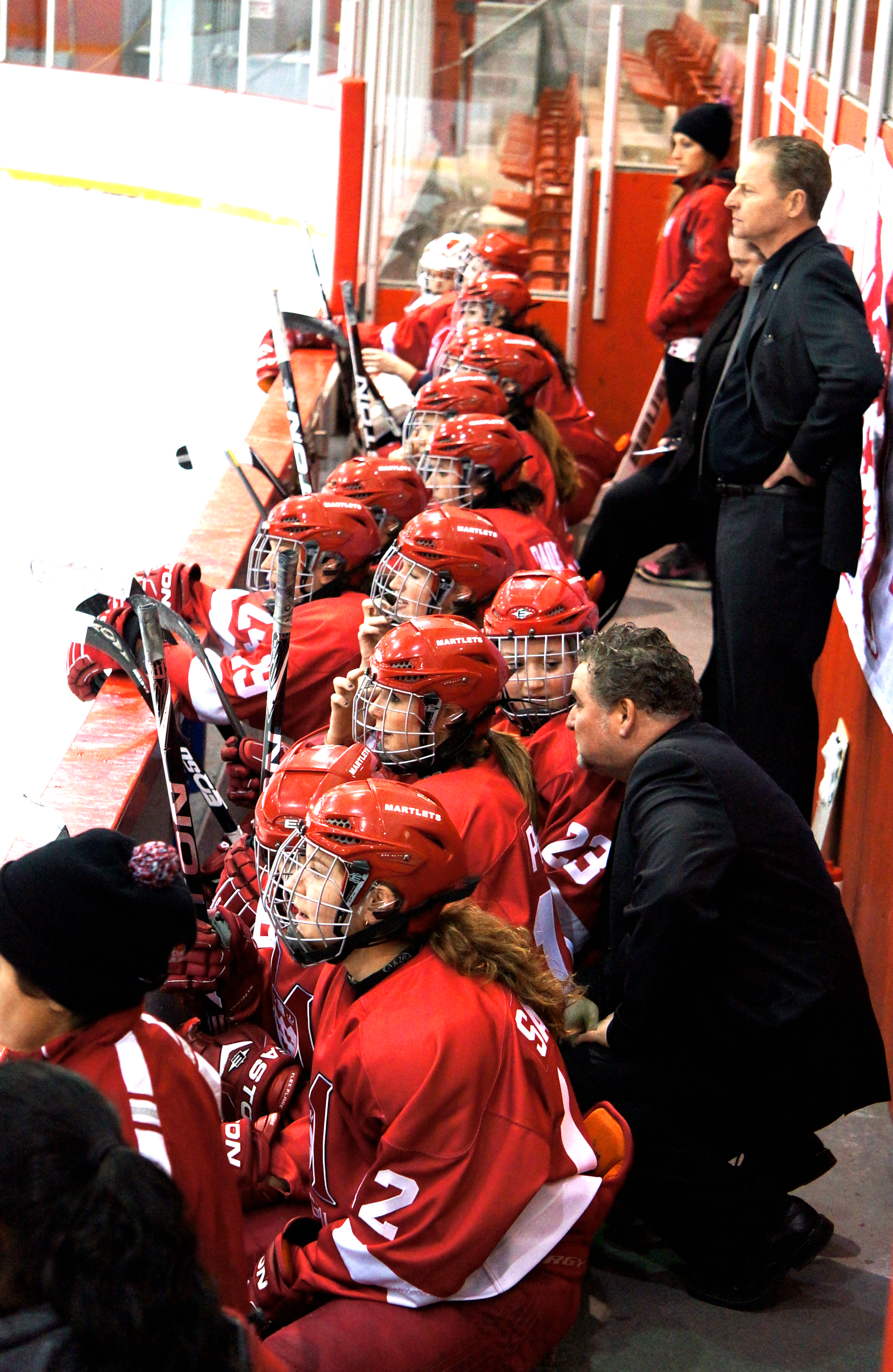
Martlets' former head coach Peter Smith

In August 2022, the Premier Hockey Federation (PHF) unveiled the newest expansion team for the 2022–23 season, the Montreal Force. In keeping with the Martlets longstanding history with Montreal women's hockey, several former Martlets members were signed to the new organisation including former head coach Peter Smith. He stepped into his role as head coach of the Force with four national championship victories with the Marlets under his belt. Jade Downie-Landry, Ann-Sophie Bettez, and Tricia Deguire, all former Marlets, also signed with the Force in 2022.

== Awards and honours ==
- Hockey Hall of Fame, class of 2020: Kim St-Pierre
- Quebec Hall of Fame, class of 2022: Charline Labonté

=== USports awards ===
U Sports was known as the Canadian Interuniversity Athletics Union (CIAU; French: Union sportive interuniversitaire canadienne – USIC) until 2001 and as Canadian Interuniversity Sport (CIS; French: Sport interuniversitaire canadien – SIC) from 2001 until the adoption of the current name in 2016.

==== Lois and Doug Mitchell Trophy ====
The Lois and Doug Mitchell U Sports Athletes of the Year Awards are awarded annually to top male and female athletes of U Sports member universities. The awards were introduced in 1993 and have previously been known as the Lieutenant Governor Athletic Awards, the Borden Ladner Gervais (BLG) Awards, and the Howard, Mackie Awards.

Each U Sports university selects a female and male athlete of the year, from which one player of each gender is chosen as the representative athlete of the year by each of the four conferences – Atlantic University Sport, Canada West, Ontario University Athletics, and RSEQ. These eight nominees are considered for the U Sports Male and Female Athletes of the Year based on their athletic accomplishments, outstanding sportsmanship and demonstrated leadership. A vote of the Canadian Athletic Foundation trustees determines the winners."

2002–03: Kim St-Pierre
2011–12: Ann-Sophie Bettez

==== Brodrick Trophy ====
The Brodrick Trophy is awarded to the outstanding player of the year during the U Sports women's ice hockey regular season. Recipients are selected by the U Sports Women's Hockey Coaches Association.

2002–03: Kim St-Pierre
2011–12: Ann-Sophie Bettez
2012–13: Mélodie Daoust
2013–14: Katia Clément-Heydra
2021–22: Jade Downie-Landry

==== Rookie of the Year ====
The U Sports Rookie of the Year Award in women's hockey recognizes a "first-year player who has exhibited exemplary skill and leadership."

2006–07: Catherine Ward
2007–08: Ann-Sophie Bettez
2008–09: Marie-Andrée Leclerc-Auger
- Leclerc-Auger became the third member of the Martlets in three years to be named as the top rookie in CIS women’s hockey. This marked the first time in CIS history that players from the same school in a team sport were honoured as the nation’s best freshman for three consecutive years. Catherine Ward and Ann-Sophie Bettez received the award in 2006–07 and 2007–08.
2011–12: Mélodie Daoust
2016–17: Tricia Deguire

==== Coach of the Year ====
The Fox 40 Coach of the Year is presented annually to the Coach of the Year in U Sports women's ice hockey based on their overall record, leadership, contribution to university hockey and overall team improvement. Members of the U SPORTS Women's Hockey Coaches Association comprise the selection committee.

2002–03: Peter Smith (co-recipient with Lisa MacDonald of Saint Mary's)
2007–08: Peter Smith
2011–12: Peter Smith

==== Marion Hilliard Award ====
The Marion Hilliard Award recognizes the most outstanding student-athlete in U Sports women's ice hockey in three areas: ice hockey, academics and community involvement.

2007–08: Shauna Denis
2019–20: Emilia Cotter

==== Championship MVP ====
The Championship MVP Award is given to the most outstanding player during the U Sports women's ice hockey championship. Members of the U Sports Women's Hockey Coaches Association in attendance at the champions comprise the selection committee.

1999–2000: Kim St-Pierre
2007–08: Cathy Chartrand
2008–09: Catherine Ward
2010–11: Jordanna Peroff
2013–14: Gabrielle Davisson
2018–19: Jade Downie-Landry

- Catherine Ward, 2007 CIS Tournament All-Star Team
- Mélodie Daoust, 2013 RSEQ scoring champion

==== All-Canadians ====
All-Canadian honours are awarded by U Sports to the most outstanding regular season players in women's ice hockey.

Note: F = forward; D = defenceman; G = goaltender

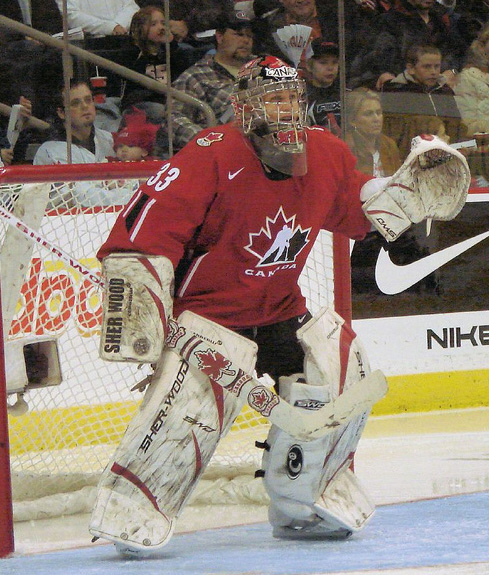
Kim St-Pierre was an All-Canada First Team selection in each of her four seasons with the Martlets

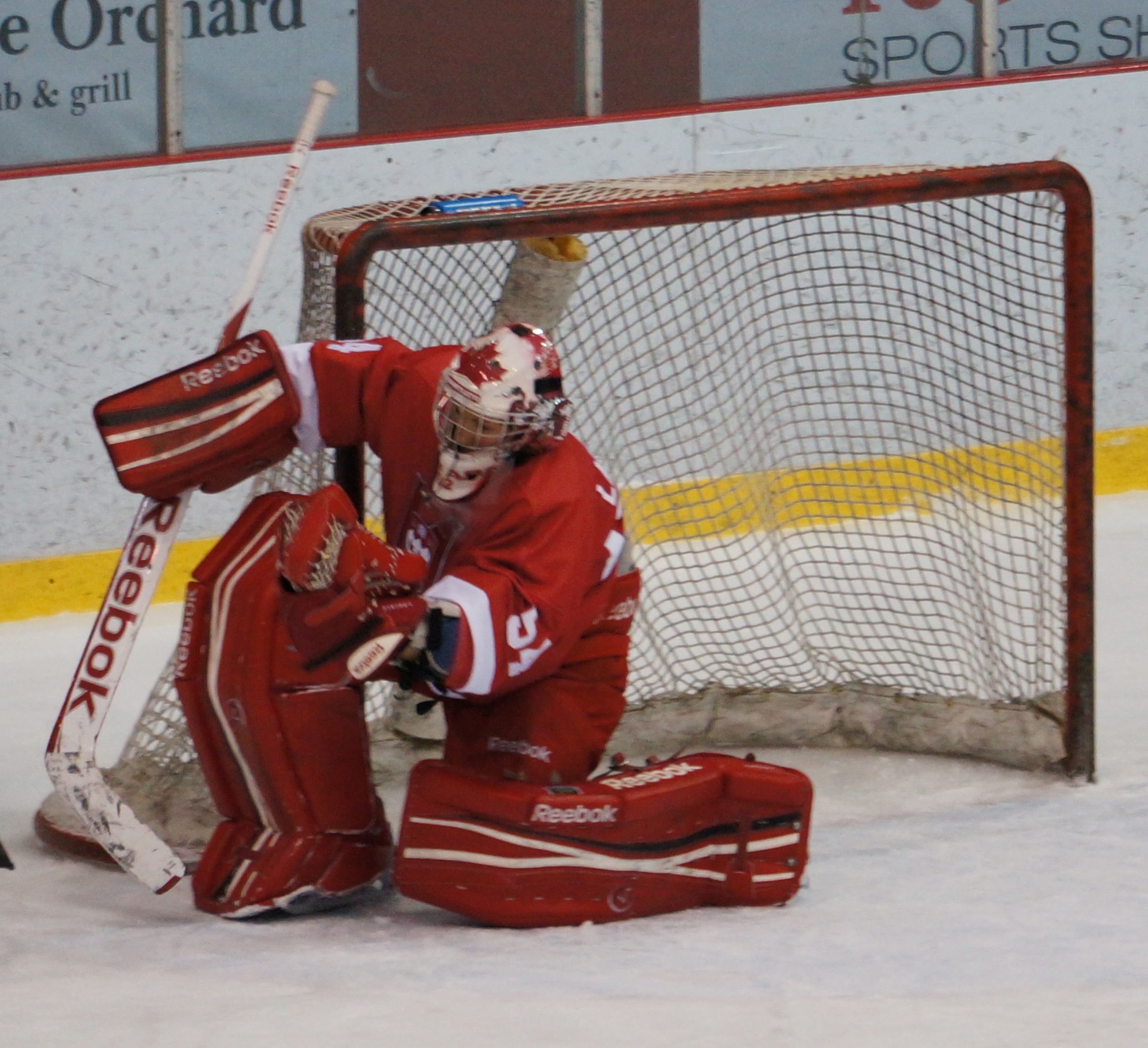
Charline Labonté was an All-Canada First Team selection in each of her five seasons with the Martlets

First Team

1998–99: Kim St-Pierre (G)
1999–2000: Kim St-Pierre (G)
2000–01: Kim St-Pierre (G)
2002–03: Kim St-Pierre (G)
2006–07: Vanessa Davison (F), Charline Labonté (G), Catherine Ward (D)
2007–08: Vanessa Davison (F), Charline Labonté (G), Catherine Ward (D)
2008–09: Ann-Sophie Bettez (F), Charline Labonté (G), Catherine Ward (D)
2009–10: Ann-Sophie Bettez (F), Cathy Chartrand (D)
2010–11: Cathy Chartrand (D), Charline Labonté (G)
2011–12: Ann-Sophie Bettez (F), Cathy Chartrand (D), Charline Labonté (G)
2012–13: Mélodie Daoust (F)
2013–14: Katia Clément-Heydra (F)
2015–16: Mélodie Daoust (F)
2016–17: Mélodie Daoust (F)
2021–22: Jade Downie-Landry (F)

Second Team

2001–02: Sophie Acheson (F)
2003–04: Veronique Lapierre (F)
2006–07: Christine Hartnoll (F)
2007–08: Ann-Sophie Bettez (F)
2008–09: Cathy Chartrand (D), Vanessa Davison (F)
2009–10: Vanessa Davison (F)
2010–11: Ann-Sophie Bettez (F), Gillian Ferrari (D)
2011–12: Mélodie Daoust (F)
2012–13: Katia Clément-Heydra (F)
2014–15: Gabrielle Davidson (F), Kelsie Moffatt (D)
2015–16: Brittney Fouracres (D)
2018–19: Tricia Deguire (G), Jade Downie-Landry (F)
2019–20: Jade Downie-Landry (F)

==== All-Rookies ====
U Sports All-Rookie Teams have recognized outstanding first-year players of the women's ice hockey regular season since 2003–04.

2004–05: Catherine Herron (G)
2006–07: Catherine Ward (D)
2007–08: Ann-Sophie Bettez (F)
2008–09: Marie-Andrée Leclerc-Auger (F)
2010–11: Katia Clément-Heydra (F)
2011–12: Mélodie Daoust (F)
2012–13: Gabrielle Davidson (F)
2016–17: Tricia Deguire (G), Jade Downie-Landry (F)

=== RSEQ Awards ===
2019–20 Leadership Award: Emilia Cotter

==== Most Outstanding Player ====
2002–03: Kim St-Pierre
2008–09: Charline Labonté
2011–12: Ann-Sophie Bettez
2012–13: Mélodie Daoust
2013–14: Katia Clément-Heydra
2015–16: Mélodie Daoust

==== Rookie of the Year ====
2011–12: Mélodie Daoust
2016–17: Tricia Deguire

==== All-Stars ====
First Team

2011-12: Charline Labonté
2013-14: Katia Clement-Heydra
2016-17: Mélodie Daoust, Tricia Deguire
2019-20: Tricia Deguire, Jade Downie-Landry

Second Team

2016-17: Olivia Atkinson, Marie-Philip Lavoie
2019-20: Kate Devries, Léa Dumais

==== RSEQ All-Rookies ====
2016-17: Tricia Deguire, Jade Downie-Landry

=== Team awards ===
- Goaltender Charline Labonté and forward Ann-Sophie Bettez of Sept-Iles, Quebec, shared the honor as co-MVPs of the 2009 McGill women's hockey team
- Chantal Gauvin, 2009 Most dedicated player honours
- Marie-Andrée Leclerc-Auger, 2009 Martlets rookie-of-the-year honours
- Marie-Andrée Leclerc-Auger, 2009 Martlets top sniper
- Rebecca Martindale, 2009 Most improved player
- Catherine Ward, 2009 Most outstanding defenceman award

== Notable Martlets ==
Several former McGill Martlets have gone on to become professional ice hockey players, including Ann-Sophie Bettez, Mélodie Daoust, Charline Labonté, Kim St-Pierre, and Catherine Ward.

=== Martlets in professional hockey ===
Four former Marlets are playing with the Premier Hockey Federation's 2022 expansion team, the Montreal Force, in its debut season: Ann-Sophie Bettez, Tricia Deguire, Jade Downey-Landry, and Laura Jardin.

= CWHL All-Star	= NWHL All-Star	= Clarkson Cup Champion	= Isobel Cup Champion

	Position	Team(s)	League(s)	Years	Titles
Ann-Sophie Bettez	Forward	Canadiennes de Montréal	CWHL		2017 Clarkson Cup
Ann-Sophie Bettez	Forward	Montreal Force	PHF		
Katia Clement-Heydra	Forward	Canadiennes de Montréal	CWHL		2017 Clarkson Cup
Katia Clement-Heydra	Coach	Montreal Force	PHF		
Alyssa Cecere	Defence	Montreal Stars	CWHL		2012 Clarkson Cup
Vanessa Davidson	Forward	Montreal Stars	CWHL		2012 Clarkson Cup
Tricia Deguire	Goaltender	Montreal Force	PHF		
Jade Downie-Landry	Forward	Montreal Force	PHF		
Brittney Fouracres	Defence	Calgary Inferno	CWHL	1 (2017-18)	
Charline Labonté	Goaltender	Canadiennes de Montréal	CWHL		2017 Clarkson Cup
Kim St-Pierre	Goaltender	Montreal Stars	CWHL		2009 Clarkson Cup; 2011 Clarkson Cup; 2012 Clarkson Cup
Olivia Sutter	Forward	Team Alberta	CWHL		
Catherine Ward	Defence	Montreal Stars	CWHL		

=== International ===
A number of Martlets have represented Canada in international competition, including with the Canadian national ice hockey team at the Winter Olympic Games and IIHF Women's World Championship, with the Canadian national university team at the Winter Universiade, and with the Canadian national developmental (under-22) ice hockey team at the Nations Cup (previously known as the Air Canada Cup, MLP Nations Cup, and Meco Cup), among other international competitions.

==== Olympics ====
- Mélodie Daoust: (gold) 2014 Winter Olympics, (silver) 2018 Winter Olympics, (gold) 2022 Winter Olympics
- Charline Labonté: (gold) 2006 Winter Olympics, (gold) 2010 Winter Olympics, (gold) 2014 Winter Olympics
- Kim St-Pierre: (gold) 2002 Winter Olympics, (gold) 2006 Winter Olympics, (gold) 2010 Winter Olympics
- Catherine Ward: (gold) 2010 Winter Olympics, (gold) 2014 Winter Olympics

==== Winter Universiade ====
- Alyssa Cecere: (gold) 2009 Winter Universiade
- Katia Clement-Heydra: (gold) 2013 Winter Universiade
- Brittney Fouracres: (silver) 2015 Winter Universiade

==== Other international ====
- Ann-Sophie Bettez: (gold) 2010 MLP Nations Cup
- Catherine Ward: (silver) 2009 MLP Nations Cup

== See also ==
- 2008–09 McGill Martlets women's ice hockey season
- 2009–10 McGill Martlets women's hockey season
- 2010–11 McGill Martlets women's hockey season
- 2011–12 McGill Martlets women's ice hockey season
