= 2011–12 McGill Martlets women's ice hockey season =

- Conference: RSSQ
- Home ice: McConnell Arena

Record

Coaches and captains
- Head coach: Peter Smith
- Assistant coaches: Amey Doyle
- Captain: Cathy Chartrand
- Alternate captain(s): Jordan Peroff; Ann-Sophie Bettez; Gillian Ferrari

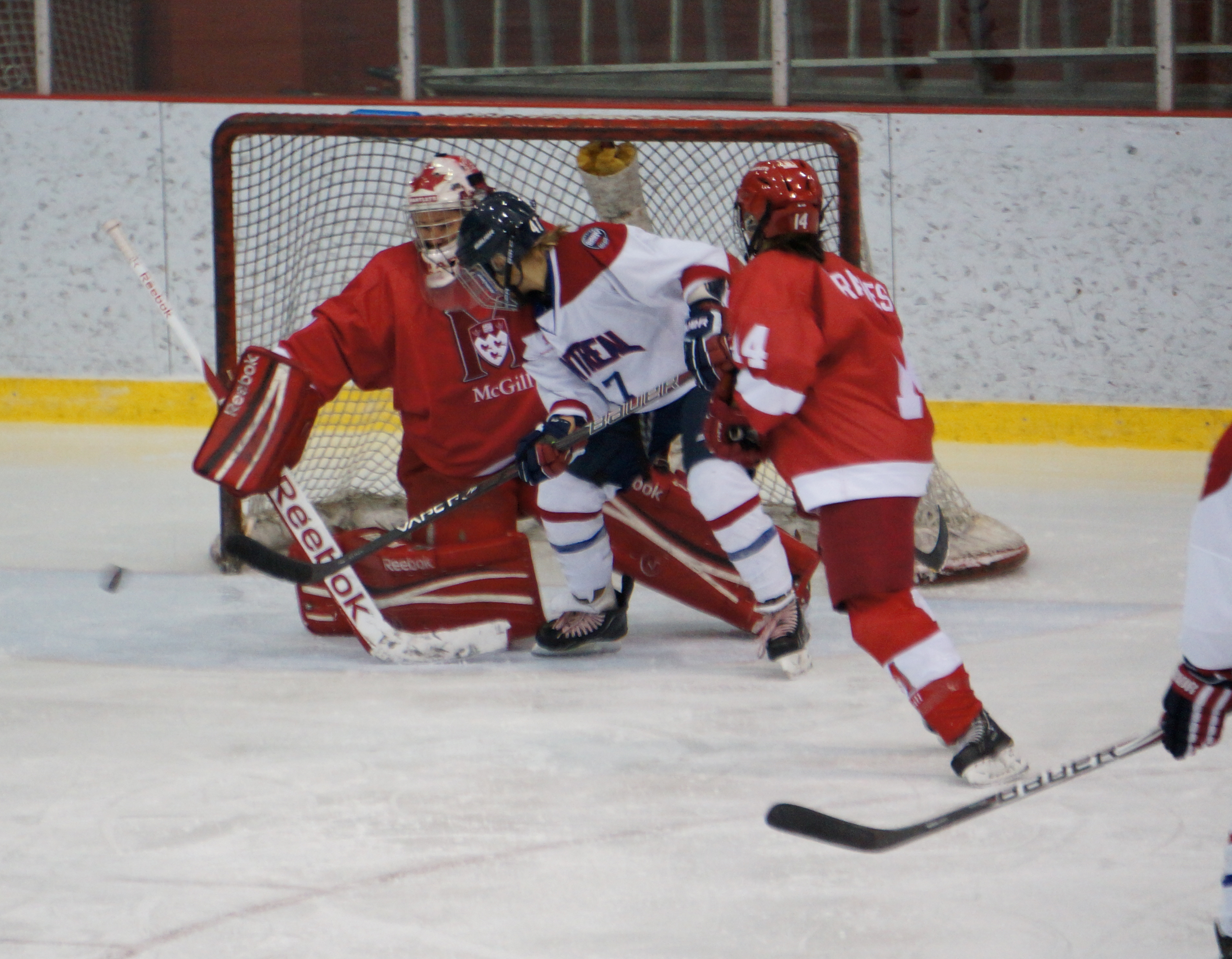

The McGill Martlets women's ice hockey team represented McGill University during the 2011–12 CIS women's ice hockey season. The Martlets were unable to repeat as national champions for the second consecutive season.

== Regular season ==
- October 29: Montreal Carabins skater Ariane Barker scored with 71 seconds left to give the squad a 3-2 win at McConnell Arena. Martlets goaltender Charline Labonte took the loss for the Martlets, giving her a 69-2 overall record in her CIS career. It marked the Martlets first loss to a Quebec conference opponent for the first time in 108 games.
- October 30: Despite outshooting the Martlets 49-21, the Carleton Lady Ravens were bested by a 3-0 tally. The game was scoreless through two periods, although Ravens skater Claudia Bergeron beat Martlets goaltender Charline Labonte with a shot in the second period. The shot hit the crossbar, but the Martlets registered a trio of goals (including an empty net goal) to win the match. Ann-Sophie Bettez scored the game-winning goal and was recognized as the player of the game for the Martlets, while Ravens goaltender Tamber Tisdale was player of the game for the Ravens.

== Schedule ==
Date	Score	Opponent
Sept. 17	WON 2-1	Queen's Golden Gaels
Sept. 23	Tied 2-2	@ Connecticut (NCAA)
Sept. 24	Lost 3-5	@ Providence (NCAA)
Sept. 25	Lost 1-5	@ Boston College (NCAA)
Sept. 30	WON 2-1	@ St-Lauwrence (NCAA)
Oct. 1	WON 3-2	@ Vermont (NCAA)
Oct. 7	WON 7-5	Concordia Stingers
Oct. 14	Won 6-1	@ Montreal Carabins
Oct. 15	WON 3-0	Ottawa Gee-Gees
Oct. 21	Lost 2-3	@ Dartmouth (BCAA)
Oct. 22	Lost 1-3	@ Harvard (NCAA)
Oct. 29	Lost 2-3	Montreal Carabins
Oct. 30	WON 3-0	@ Carleton Lady Ravens
Nov. 4	Lost 1-2	@ Syracuse (NCAA)
Nov. 6	WON 1-0	Concordia Stingers
Nov. 12	WON 4-1	Carleton Lady Ravens
Nov. 18	WON 10-1	@ Montreal Carabins
Nov. 20	WON 5-1	@ Ottawa Gee-Gees
Nov. 25	WON 3-0	Ottawa Gee-Gees
Nov. 27	WON 6-2	@ Concordia Stingers
Dec. 28	WON 4-0	St-Francis Xavier X-Women
Dec. 29	WON 3-0	Manitoba Bisons
Dec. 30	WON 5-4	Laurier Golden Hawks
Jan. 7	WON 4-0	@ Yale (NCAA)
Jan. 13	WON 4-0	Concordia Stingers
Jan. 14	WON 5-0	Montreal Carabins
Jan. 18	Lost 4-1	Montreal Stars (CWHL)
Jan. 22	Lost 3-4 (OTS)	Carleton Lady Ravens
Jan. 27	WIN 7-1	@ Ottawa Gee-Gees
Jan. 28	WIN 10-0	@ Carleton Lady Ravens
Feb. 3	WIN 2-1	@ Montreal Carabins
Feb. 10	WIN 6-0	@ Ottawa Gee-Gees
Feb. 11	WIN 6-1	@ Carleton Lady Ravens
Feb. 17	Cancel by McGill	Montreal Stars(CWHL)
Feb. 19	WIN 3-0	Concordia Stingers

=== Playoffs ===
RSEQ Best-of-three Semifinal Series
Février 22, McGill Martlets 0-2 Ottawa Gee-Gees
Février 24, McGill Martlets 8-0 Ottawa Gee-Gees
Février 26, McGill Martlets 9-1 Ottawa Gee-Gees

RSEQ Best-of-three Championship Series
Février 29, McGill Martlets 5-1 Montreal Carabins
March 2, McGill Martlets 4-0 Montreal Carabins
March 4, ---

CIS National Championship
March 8 to 11

== Current Roster 2011-2012 ==
Goaltenders
Number		Player	Former Team	Hometown
1	(Canada)	Taylor Salisbury	Vancouver Fusion	Surrey, British Columbia
29	(Canada)	Andrea Weckman	Brampton Junior Thunder	Kitchener, Ontario
54	(Canada)	Charline Labonté	Collège Lionel Groulx	Boisbriand, Quebec

Defence
Number		Player	Former Team	Hometown
2	(Canada)	Stacie Tardif	Dawson College Blues women's ice hockey	St-Anne de Bellevue, Quebec
5	(Canada)	Elizabeth Hiller	Vimy Ridge Academy	Edmonton, Alberta
8	(Canada)	Cathy Chartrand	Montreal Axion	Lac nominingue, Quebec
11	(Canada)	Michelle Daigneault	Nepean Junior	Hay River, North West Territories
13	(Canada)	Kelsie Moffatt	Pine Ridge Secondary	Pickering, Ontario
14	(Canada)	Britney Fouracres	Edge School	Calgary, Alberta
22	(Canada)	Adrienne Crampton	Bishop Strachan School	Toronto, Ontario
27	(Canada)	Gillian Ferrari	Calgary Olympic Oval	Thomhill, Ontario

Forwards
Number		Player	Former Team	Hometown
03	(Canada)	Kim Tom-That	Hotchkiss School	Beaconsfield, Quebec
4	(Canada)	Leslie Oles	Montreal Stars	Beaconsfield, Quebec
6	(Canada)	Ionna Caglanos	Dawson College Blues women's ice hockey	Montreal, Quebec
9	(Canada)	Darragh Hamilton	John Abbott Islanders	Omstown, Quebec
10	(Canada)	Jordanna Peroff	Keswick High School	Keswick, Ontario
12	(Canada)	Chelsey Saunders	Nepean Junior Wildcats	Ottawa, Ontario
16	(Canada)	Logan Murray	Edge School	Calgary, Alberta
17	(Canada)	Melodie Daoust	Lynx du Collège Édouard-Montpetit women's ice hockey	Valleyfield, Quebec
19	(Canada)	Katia Clément-Heydra	Lynx du Collège Édouard-Montpetit women's ice hockey	St-Bruno, Quebec
20	(Canada)	Lainie Smith	Cardinal center Catholic HS	Aurora, Ontario
21	(Canada)	Stefanie Pohlod	Edge School	Calgary, Alberta
23	(Canada)	Erika Pyke	Appleby College	Spryfield, Nova Scotia
24	(Canada)	Ann-Sophie Bettez	Dawson College Blues women's ice hockey	Sept-Iles, Quebec

== Staff 2011-2012 ==
- Councillor-Adviser: Derek Drummond
- Head Coach: Peter Smith
- Assistant Coach: Amey Doyle
- Assistant Coach: Stewart McCarthey
- Equipment Coordinator: Erika Petosa
- Therapist: Amélie Brais, Stéphanie Antoniades, Micheline Lagace, Lishani Mahendrajah, Julie Mercier
- Team Physician: Dr. Monica Cermignani
- Communications Officer: Earl Zukerman

== Awards and honors ==
- Ann-Sophie Bettez, 2012 Brodrick Trophy
- Melodie Daoust, 2012 CIS Rookie of the Year

== See also ==
- McGill Martlets ice hockey
- 2010–11 McGill Martlets women's hockey season
- 2009–10 McGill Martlets women's hockey season
- 2008–09 McGill Martlets women's ice hockey season
