= 2010–11 McGill Martlets women's hockey season =

2010–11 McGill Martlets women's ice hockey season

Bison Hockey Holiday Classic champions CIS National Championship
- Conference: 1 QSSF
- Home ice: McConnell Arena

Rankings
- CIS: 1

Record

Coaches and captains
- Head coach: Peter Smith
- Assistant coaches: Amey Doyle

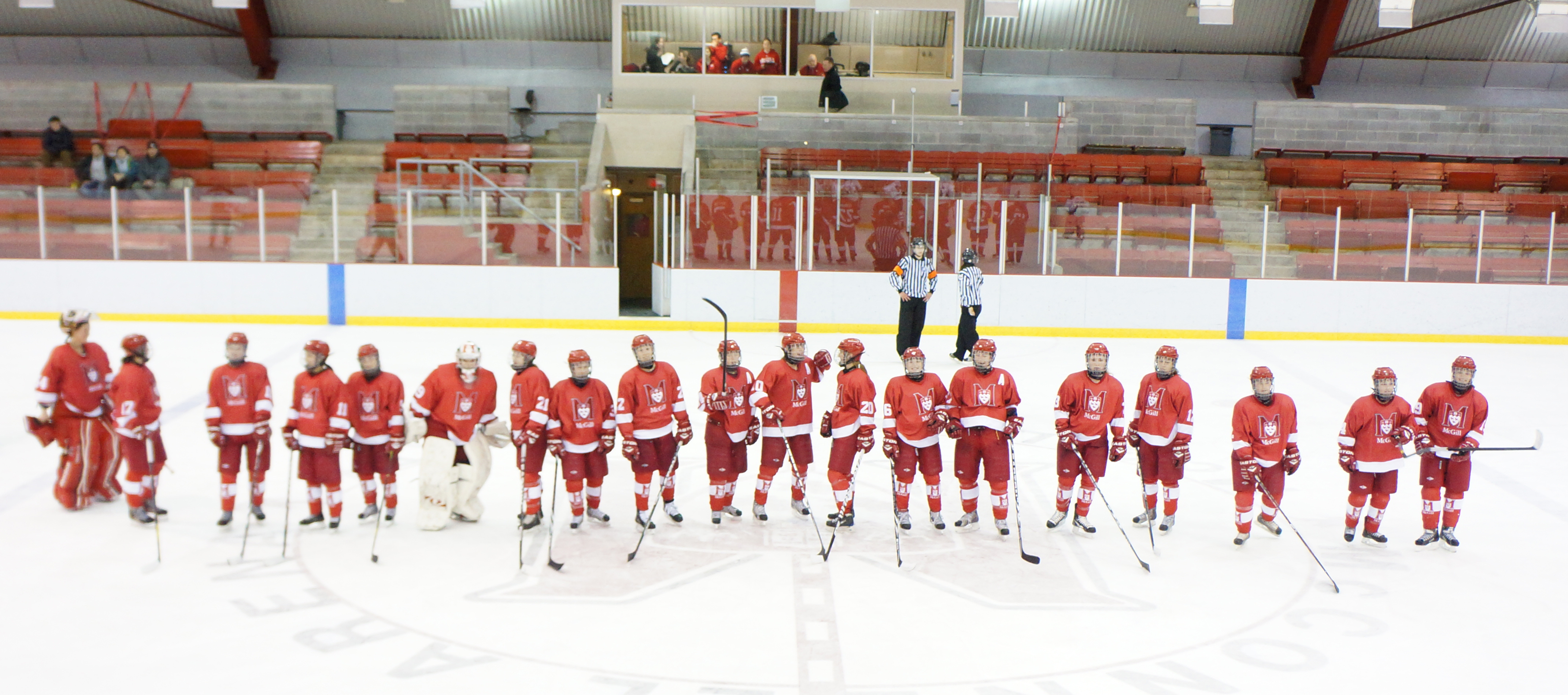

The McGill Martlets represented McGill University in the 2010-11 Canadian Interuniversity Sport women's hockey season. The Martlets attempted to win their third Canadian Interuniversity Sport women's ice hockey championship. Their head coach was Peter Smith and he was assisted by Amey Doyle, Stewart McCarthey and Shauna Denis. The Martlets captured the CIS title on Sunday with a 5-2 victory over the St. Francis Xavier X-Women

== CIS Exhibition ==
Date	Opponent	Score
Sept. 18	Wilfird Laurier	3-2
Sept. 19	Guelph	3-0
Nov. 20	Saint Mary's	6-0

=== CWHL exhibition ===
Date	Opponent	Score
Feb. 4	Montreal Stars	

== NCAA Exhibition ==
- October 23: The Harvard women's hockey team took a 2-1 lead into the third period but allowed a goal for a 2-2 tie at Bright Hockey Center. McGill took advantage of a five-on-three situation early in the first period as Cathy Chartrand took a feed from Gillian Ferrari and beat Bellamy for a 1-0 lead. Harvard had several opportunities on the power play in the 17th minute, but could not score on McGill netminder Andrea Wickman. With less than a minute to play in the game, McGill pulled its goaltender. With an extra skater, Ann-Sophie Bettez and Leslie Oles almost scored. In the end, Katia Clement-Hydra converted from close range to tie the score at 2-2. The overtime stanza did not result in a game-winning goal.

Date	Opponent	Score
Sept. 24	Providence	1-3
Sept. 25	Providence	4-6
Sept. 26	Northeastern	2-3 (OT), Northeastern
Oct. 1	St. Lawrence	1-2
Oct. 2	Vermont	Tie, 2–2
Oct. 15	Princeton	4-3
Oct. 17	Yale	1-0
Oct. 22	Dartmouth	3-2
Oct. 23	Harvard	Tie, 2-2

== Roster ==
Number	Position	Player	Years
1.	G	Taylor Salisbury	(2)
2	D	Stacie Tardiff	(3)
3	F	Kim Ton-That	(2)
4	F	Leslie Oles	(1)
6	F	Caroline Hill	(5)
7	F	Alessandra Lind-Kenny	(4)
8	D	Cathy Chartrand	(4)
9	F	Darragh Hamilton	(2)
10	F	Jordanna Peroff	(4)
11	D	Michelle Daigneault	(1)
12	F	Chelsey Saunders	(2)
14	F	Alyssa Cecere	(5)
15	D	Lisa Zane	(5)
16	F	Logan Murray	(1)
18	D	Jasmine Sheehan	(5)
19	F	Katia Clement-Heydra	(1)
20	F	Lainie Smith	(3)
22	D	Adrienne Crampton	(1)
24	F	Ann-Sophie Bettez	(4)
27	D	Gillian Ferrari	(1)
29	G	Andrea Weckman	(2)
54	G	Charline Labonté	(4)

== Regular season ==
=== News and notes ===
- On September 18, 2010, Gillian Ferrari, a first-year Martlets player scored her first-ever CIS goal. It was on a 4-on-3 power play versus Wilfrid Laurier University.
- On October 8, 2010, Leslie Oles, a first-year Martlets player scored once and added a pair of assists as the Martlets skated to a 7-4 win over Concordia Stingers in the season opener. The victory extended McGill's win streak to 82 consecutive games over QUHL opponents.
- On February 10, 2011, Melodie Daoust signed a letter of intent to play for the McGill Martlets. She refused offers from numerous Canadian and American universities, including Cornell, Dartmouth and a full scholarship from Boston University.

=== Schedule ===
Date	Opponent	Location	Score	Record
Oct. 8	Concordia	McConnell Arena	7-4	
Oct. 20	Montreal	McConnell Arena	5-2	
Oct. 30	Carleton	McConnell Arena	3-0	
Oct 31	Ottawa	uOttawa Sports Complex	3-0	
Nov. 7	Carleton; Homecoming Game	McConnell Arena	6-1	
Nov. 13	Montreal	McConnell Arena	4-3 (OT)	
Nov. 21	Ottawa	uOttawa Sports Complex	3-0	
Nov. 26	Montreal	4-0	Arena CEPSUM	
Nov. 27	Carleton	2-1 (OT)	Carleton Ice House	
Dec. 4	Concordia	4-1	Ed Meagher Arena	
Jan. 7	5-1	Ottawa	McConnell Arena	
Jan. 8	3-0	Concordia	Ed Meagher Arena	
Jan. 23		Montreal	McConnell Arena	
Jan. 29		Carleton	Carleton Ice House	
Jan. 30		Ottawa	uOttawa Sports Complex	
Feb. 5		Carleton	McConnell Arena	
Feb. 11		Concordia	Ed Meagher Arena	
Feb. 12		Ottawa	McConnell Arena	
Feb. 18		Montreal	Arena CEPSUM	
Feb. 19		Concordia	McConnell Arena	

== Tournaments ==
=== Bison Hockey Holiday Classic ===
- December 31: Charline Labonte required only 13 saves to post her 59th career shutout as McGill defeated the nationally ranked fifth overall Alberta Pandas by a 3-0 mark in the final game of the Bisons Holiday Classic tournament at Max Bell Arena. In the game, the Martlets held a 31-13 edge in shots. Gillian Ferrari was credited with the game-winner on the power-play at 5:49 of the first period. Jasmine Sheehan, a fifth-year defender scored the second goal of the game. Logan Murray, a freshman from Calgary, scored the last goal of the contest.

Date	Opponent	Location	Score
Dec. 29	Manitoba	Max Bell Arena	5-0
Dec. 30	Saskatchewan	Max Bell Arena	9-2
Dec. 31	Alberta	Max Bell Arena	3-0

== Postseason ==
=== Quebec semis ===
Date	Opponent	Location	Score
Feb 23			
Feb 25			
Feb 27			

=== Quebec finals ===
Date	Opponent	Location	Score
March 2			
March 4			
March 6			

=== CIS finals ===
McGill went into the six-team national tournament as the No. 1 seed for the fifth straight year after posting a 20-0 record to finish first in the Quebec conference for the sixth consecutive year and the seventh time in school history. Their CIS final opponents, StFX finished with a 29-1 record in league and playoff action and a silver-medal finish, the best result ever by an Atlantic conference team. The five Martlets goals were scored by Ann-Sophie Bettez, Jordanna Peroff, Caroline Hill, Jasmine Sheehan, and Alessandra Lind-Kenny.

Date	Opponent	Location	Score
March 10	Alberta Pandas	Waterloo, ON	4-2
March 12	Queen's Golden Gaels	Waterloo, ON	3-1
March 13	St. Francis Xavier X-Women	Waterloo, Ontario	5-2

== Outgoing seniors ==
- The Martlets will lose five fifth-year seniors, including forwards Caroline Hill and Alyssa Cecere, along with defenders Lisa Zane and Jasmine Sheehan.

== Awards and honors ==
- Jordanna Peroff, CIS finals Most Valuable Player
- 2011 CIS Tournament All-Stars
  - Defence: Cathy Chartrand, McGill
  - Forward: Jordanna Peroff, McGill
  - Forward: Leslie Oles, McGill

== See also ==
- McGill Martlets ice hockey
- 2011–12 McGill Martlets women's ice hockey season
- 2009–10 McGill Martlets women's hockey season
- 2008–09 McGill Martlets women's ice hockey season
