= Katia Clement-Heydra =

Canadian ice hockey player, coach, and administrator (born 1989)

Personal information
- Born: 2 November 1989 (age 36) Saint-Bruno-de-Montarville, Quebec, Canada
- Education: McGill University
- Occupations: Ice hockey player; coach; administrator
- Employer: New York Sirens
Ice hockey career
- Height: 5 ft 7 in (170 cm)
- Weight: 156 lb (71 kg; 11 st 2 lb)
- Position: Forward
- Shot: Left
- Played for: MODO Hockey; Canadiennes de Montréal; McGill Martlets
- Coached for: Force de Montréal; Bishop's Gaiters; McGill Martlets; AL Boomerang
- Playing career: 2007–2020
- Coaching career: 2015–present
Medal record
Representing Canada
Universiade
| Gold medal – first place | 2013 Italy | Ice hockey |

Katia Clément-Heydra (born 2 November 1989) is a Canadian ice hockey administrator, coach, and retired professional forward. She has served as manager of player services and hockey administration to the New York Sirens of the Professional Women's Hockey League (PWHL) since autumn 2023.

Clement-Heydra's career included seasons played in the Canadian Women's Hockey League (CWHL) and Swedish Women's Hockey League (SDHL), and she has coached in the Premier Hockey Federation (PHF) and U Sports women's ice hockey.

== Playing career ==
Clement-Heydra played three seasons with the Lynx du Collège Édouard-Montpetit women's ice hockey program in the Ligue de hockey féminin collégial AA during 2007 to 2010.

=== University ===
Ahead of the 2010–11 season, she joined the McGill Martlets women's ice hockey program in the Réseau du sport étudiant du Québec (RSEQ) of Canadian Interuniversity Sport (CIS; renamed U Sports in 2016).

In December 2013, Clement-Heydra represented Canada in the women's ice hockey tournament at the 2013 Winter Universiade in Trentino, Italy. Helping the Canadian national women's student team capture its third consecutive gold medal, her eighteen points (five goals, thirteen assists) across seven games ranked second overall among tournament players.

During the 2013–14 CIS women's ice hockey season, Clement-Heydra led all players in the RSEQ conference, with 40 points, and ranked second overall among competitors in the CIS. Appearing in twenty games, she record thirteen goals, of which four were game-winning goals. At season's end, she received the Brodrick Trophy as the CIS women's ice hockey player of the year. Her selection marked the third straight season that a member of the Martlets was chosen for the Brodrick Trophy, following teammates Ann-Sophie Bettez, in 2012, and Mélodie Daoust, in 2013.

=== Professional ===
Clement-Heydra was selected in the second round of the 2015 CWHL Draft by Les Canadiennes de Montréal. She made her Canadian Women's Hockey League debut with Les Canadiennes in the 2015–16 CWHL season and remained with the club until the collapse of the league in 2019. She scored the opening goal in the 2017 CWHL playoff finals, which culminated in a Clarkson Cup victory for Les Canadiennes.

Following the collapse of the CWHL, Clement-Heydra signed with MODO Hockey of the Swedish Women's Hockey League.

== Coaching career ==
Clement-Heydra served as an assistant coach to the AL Boomerang women's ice hockey program of Cégep André-Laurendeau in Montreal from 2015 to 2019, concurrent to her time playing with Les Canadiennes. During 2017 to 2019, she also worked as a skills coach with the McGill Martlets women's hockey program.

Following a career-ending injury sustained while competing professionally in Sweden, Clement-Heydra committed to full-time coaching. After returning to her home province of Quebec, she joined the Sherbrooke Harfangs, a sport-études program operating in partnership with École secondaire du Triolet (lit. 'Triolet Secondary School') in Sherbrooke. In addition to serving as head coach of the Sherbrooke Harfangs girls' AAA teams at the under-13 and under-15 levels during the 2020–21 season, she worked as an assistant coach with the Harfangs under-18 team and as a skills coach with the Bishop's Gaiters women's ice hockey program. Her efforts were recognized by Hockey Canada via her selection as the provincial winner for Quebec of the 2021 BFL Female Coach of the Year Award in the community category.

In August 2021, Clement-Heydra was appointed associate head coach of the McGill Martlets women's hockey program by head coach Alyssa Cecere.

Clement-Heydra served as assistant coach to the Force de Montréal of the Premier Hockey Federation during the team's inaugural season in 2022–23, alongside head coach Peter Smith and associate coach Pierre Alain. Her contract was renewed for the 2023–24 season shortly before the PHF was bought-out and dissolved in June 2023.

== Administrative career ==
Following the dissolution of the PHF, Clement-Heydra joined the staff of PWHL New York (renamed New York Sirens in 2024) in the newly formed Professional Women's Hockey League. She briefly served as a scout for the team until being named manager of player services and hockey administration.

== Personal life ==
Clement-Heydra earned a Bachelor of Arts degree in industrial relations from McGill University in 2014 and, during her fifth year of U Sports eligibility at McGill (2014–15), she studied physical education.

== Awards and honours ==
- 2012–13 CIS All-Canadian, Second Team
- 2013–14 CIS All-Canadian, First Team
- 2013–14 RSEQ conference scoring title
- 2014 Brodrick Trophy
- 2014 BLG Awards, RSEQ Finalist (Female)
- 2017 Clarkson Cup Champion

=== Coaching ===
- 2021 BFL Female Coach of the Year Award, Quebec Provincial Winner – Community Category
