= 2009–10 McGill Martlets women's hockey season =

2009–10 McGill Martlets women's ice hockey season

Theresa Humes Tournament co-champions Runner-up, CIS National Championship
- Conference: QSSF

Record
- Overall: 27-6-0

Coaches and captains
- Head coach: Amey Doyle
- Assistant coaches: Stewart McCarthey; Shauna Denis; Patrick Magee

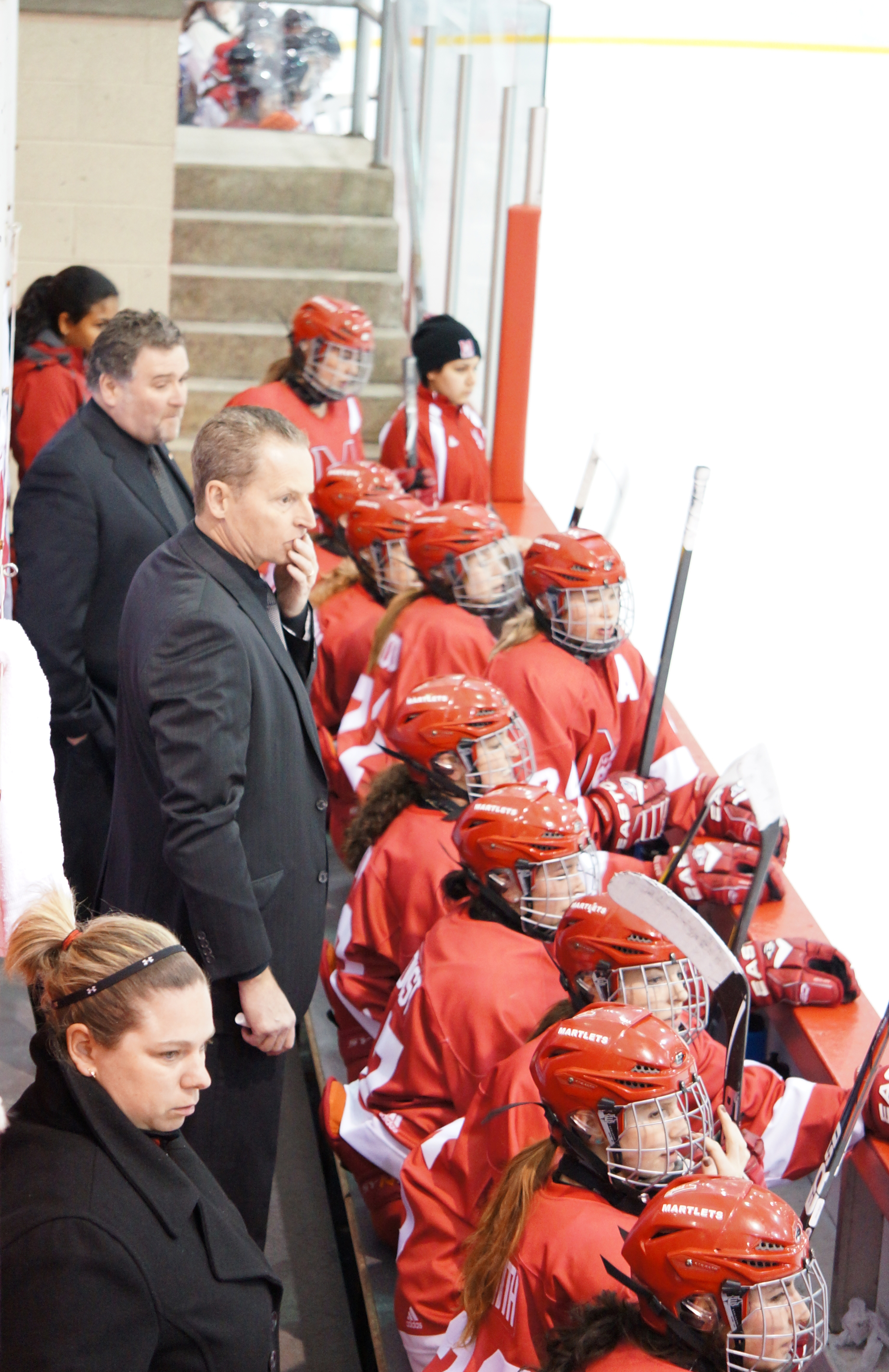

The McGill Martlets will represent McGill University in the 2009-10 Canadian Interuniversity Sport women's hockey season. The Martlets were not able to win their third Canadian Interuniversity Sport women's ice hockey championship. The Martlets head coach is Amey Doyle. The Alberta Pandas defeated the Martlets 2–0 in the CIS National Championship.

== Offseason ==
- Amey Doyle has been appointed interim head coach of the McGill University women's hockey team. Doyle is a native of Smiths Falls, Ont., and replaces Peter Smith. Smith, has taken a one-year leave of absence to serve as an assistant coach with the Canadian women's Olympic team. Doyle's coaching staff includes Stewart McCarthey, and former McGill player Shauna Denis. Denis captained the Martlets to their first national crown in 2008. Patrick Magee will serve as the team's strength and conditioning coach.

=== Battle of the Sexes ===
- Sept. 13: The Lac St. Louis Tigers, a boys midget AA club, defeated the McGill women's hockey team 4–2 in a preseason scrimmage at McConnell Arena. The McGill goals were scored by Ann-Sophie Bettez and Vanessa Davidson.
- Sept. 18: The Montreal Blitz, a boys midget AA team defeated the McGill women's hockey squad 9–5 in a pre-season scrimmage at McConnell Arena, Friday. The Martlets goals were scored by Jordanna Peroff, Alexandra Wells, Alyssa Cecere, and fifth-year veteran Vanessa Davidson.

== Exhibition ==
- Three of the Martlets exhibition games will involve NCAA teams.

Date	Location	Opponent	Score
Sun. Sept 27	Matthews Arena	Northeastern	McGill, 3-1
Sat. Oct 3	Appleton Arena	St. Lawrence	St. Lawrence, 2-1
Sun. Oct 4	Burlington, VT	Vermont	McGill, 2-1
Fri. Oct 23	Hanover, N.H.	Dartmouth	Dartmouth, 4-2
Sat. Oct 24	Bright Hockey Center	Harvard	Harvard, 4-1
Sun. Oct 25	New Haven, CT	Yale	Yale, 4-2

== Regular season ==
- The Martlets top the inaugural women's hockey coaches poll of the 2009–2010 season.
- November 14: The beginning of the game featured ceremonial raising of last spring's CIS championship. By defeating Carleton University, the Martlets extended their win streak to 61 consecutive games against CIS opponents since losing 2-1 in an overtime shootout at Alberta on Dec. 30, 2007. Against Carleton University, McGill has won 34 straight contests and are 46-0-1 lifetime against them.
- December 21: Goaltender Charline Labonté of the McGill Martlets and three graduates from the university, were officially named by Hockey Canada as part of the Canadian Olympic women's hockey team for the 2010 Winter Games in Vancouver, B.C. Joining Labonte are Catherine Ward, Kim St. Pierre, and Peter Smith. Smith will serve as an Assistant Coach.
- December 30: Alyssa Cecere scored the game-winner, shorthanded, and added three helpers as top-ranked McGill doubled No.4-Manitoba 4-2 on the final day of the Theresa Humes women's hockey tournament at Concordia University.
- Ann-Sophie Bettez was a member of Canada's Under-22 National Team that won the Gold Medal at the 2010 MLP Cup in Germany.
- Ann-Sophie Bettez had two goals and defenceman Cathy Chartrand added three assists as the No.1-ranked McGill won for the 78th consecutive outing, blanking Concordia 3-0 in women's hockey at the Ed Meagher Arena. It marked McGill's 32nd straight win over the Stingers, who haven't scored against the Martlets in more than six regular season games, dating back to a 16-1 McGill win on Nov. 15, 2007.
- February 16: The undefeated McGill Martlets are the No. 1 ranked team for the 38th consecutive week, dating back to Nov. 6, 2007.

=== Roster ===
Number	Name	Position	Height	Year
24	Ann-Sophie Bettez	Forward	5'4"	3
14	Alyssa Cecere	Forward	5'7"	4
08	Cathy Chartrand	Defence	5'10"	3
25	Vanessa Davidson	Forward	5'8"	5
06	Caroline Hill	Forward	5'5"	4
22	Marie-Andree Leclerc-Auger	Forward	5'5"	2
07	Alessandra Lind-Kenny	Forward	5'6"	3
10	Jordanna Peroff	Forward	5'6"	3
16	Shaunn Rabinovich	Defence	5'9"	2*
18	Jasmine Sheehan	Defence	5'5"	4
20	Lainie Smith	Forward	5'6"	2*
21	Amy Soberano	Forward	5'4"	4
02	Stacie Tardif	Defence	5'5"	2*
23	Victoria Wells	Forward	5'7"	3
13	Alexandra Wells	Forward	5'7"	3
15	Lisa Zane	Defence	5'4"	4

=== Standings ===
2009–10 QSSF
	Conference						
	GP	W	L	T	GF	GA	PTS
McGill	20	20	0	0	79	18	40
Montréal	20	13	6	1	58	55	27
Ottawa	20	8	11	1	51	67	17
Carleton	20	8	12	0	39	47	16
Concordia	20	1	16	3	35	75	5

=== Schedule ===
Date	Opponent	Arena	Score
Oct. 9	Concordia	McConnell Arena	5-0
Oct. 17	Univ. of Ottawa	McConnell Arena	6-0
Oct. 30	Univ. of Montreal	Arena CEPSUM	7-2
Oct. 31	Carleton	McConnell Arena	1-0
Nov. 7	Univ. of Montreal	McConnell Arena	3-2 (OT)
Nov. 8	Univ. of Ottawa	uOttawa Sports Complex	6-1
Nov. 14	Carleton University	McConnell Arena	4-2
Nov. 20	St. Francis Xavier	Oland Center	4-0
Nov. 21	St. Mary's	Alumni Arena	11-0
Nov. 22	Dalhousie	Memorial Arena	7-2
Nov. 27	Univ. of Montreal	Arena CEPSUM	5-1
Nov. 28	Carleton University	Carleton Ice House	3-1
Dec. 5	Concordia	Ed Meagher Arena	3-0
Jan. 8	Ottawa	McConnell Arena	4-2
Jan. 9	Concordia	McConnell Arena	3-0
Jan. 17	Ottawa	uOttawa Sports Complex	4-2
Jan. 22	Montreal	McConnell Arena	3-0
Feb. 13	Ottawa	McConnell Arena	4-1
Feb. 14	Concordia	Ed Meagher Arena	3-0

=== Tournaments ===
- The Martlets will participate in the Theresa Humes Tournament at Concordia University.

Date	Opponent	Location	Time	Score
Dec. 28	Toronto	Ed Meagher Arena	6:30 pm	4-1
Dec. 29	Guelph	Ed Meagher Arena	6:00 pm	8-1
Dec. 29	Manitoba	Ed Meagher Arena	4:00 pm	4-2

== Player stats ==
=== Skaters ===
Player	Goals	Assists	Points	Shots	+/-	PIM

=== Goaltenders ===
Player	Games played	Minutes	Goals Against	Wins	Losses	Ties	Shutouts	Save %	Goals Against Average

== Postseason ==
- The Alberta Pandas defeated the McGill Martlets to claim the 2010 Canadian Interuniversity Championship. The Pandas ended the Martlets historic 86 game unbeaten streak against CIS opponents. Said streak dated back to December 30 of 2007. It was the Pandas who also beat the Martlets back on that date. Alberta had notched a 2-1 shootout victory. With the win, the Pandas also snapped the Martlets 20 game unbeaten streak in the postseason. This streak is also linked to the Alberta Pandas who claimed a 4-0 win in the 2007 CIS gold medal game. In the 2010 Championship Game, Melody Howard's unassisted goal at 6:09 in the first period held up as the game-winning goal. Forward Alana Cabana scored the second goal of the game.

=== CIS Tournament ===
Date	Opponent	Location	Score
March 14	Alberta Pandas		0-2

== Awards and honors ==
- Ann-Sophie Bettez: McGill University female athlete of the week for the period ending Nov. 8, 2009
- Ann-Sophie Bettez: McGill University female athlete of the week for the period ending Feb. 15, 2010
- CIS Tournament championship player of the game: Ann-Sophie Bettez (McGill Martlets)
- CIS Tournament All-Stars
  - Defense: Cathy Chartrand, McGill

== See also ==
- McGill Martlets ice hockey
- 2011–12 McGill Martlets women's ice hockey season
- 2010–11 McGill Martlets women's hockey season
- 2008–09 McGill Martlets women's ice hockey season
