= Alyssa Cecere =

Canadian ice hockey player and coach

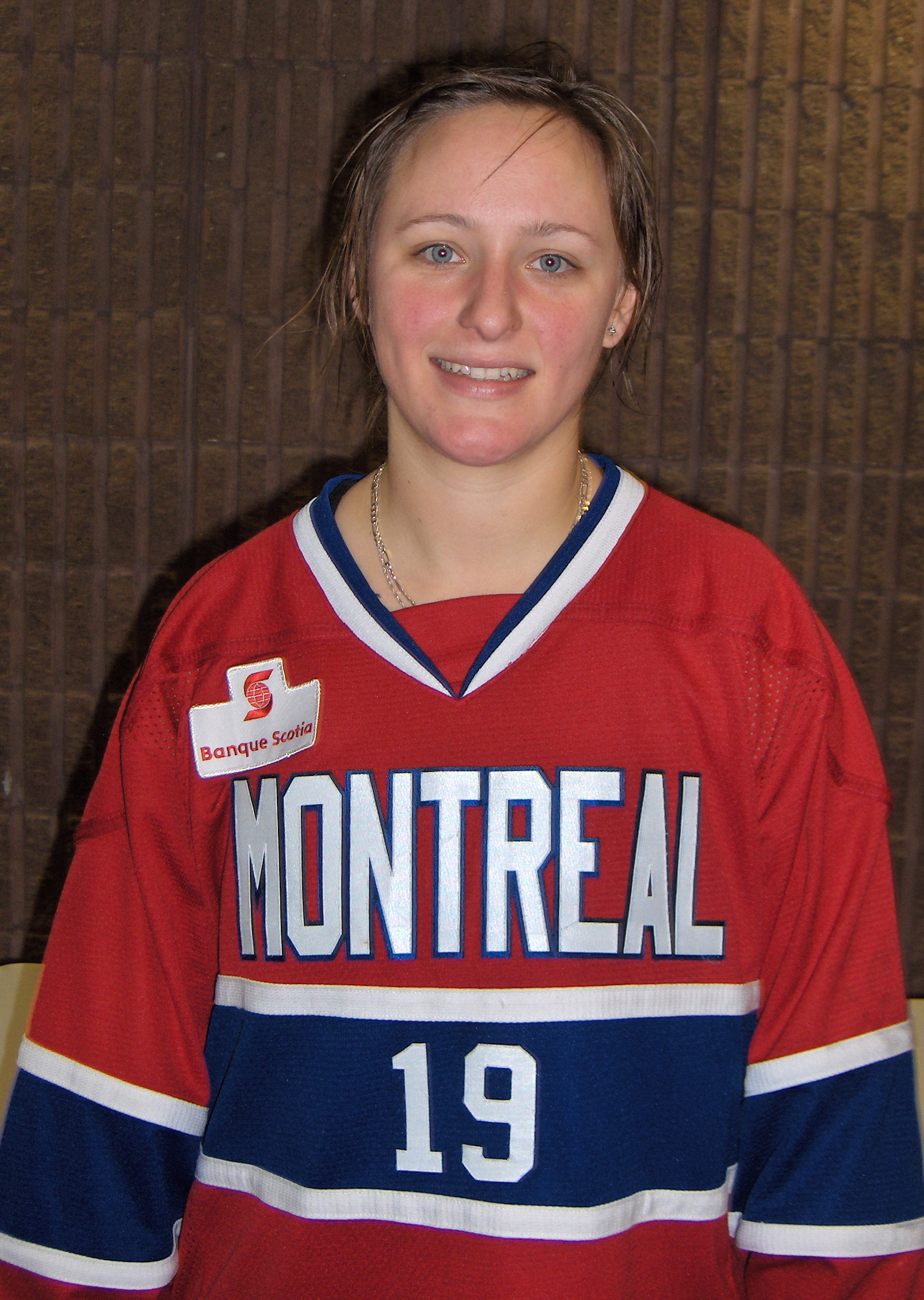
- Cecere with the Montreal Stars in 2011

Current position
- Title: Head coach
- Team: McGill Martlets
- Conference: RSEQ

Biographical details
- Born: September 4, 1987 (age 39); Brossard, Quebec, Canada
- Education: McGill University

Playing career
- 2005–2011: McGill Martlets
- 2011–2014: Stars de Montréal
- Positions: Left wing, defence

Coaching career (HC unless noted)
- 2011–2014: Dawson College Blues (assistant)
- 2014–2020: McGill Martlets (associate)
- 2020–: McGill Martlets
Medal record
Universiade
Gold medal – first place	2009 Harbin	Ice hockey

Alyssa Cecere (born 4 September 4, 1987) is a Canadian ice hockey coach and player. She is head coach of the McGill Martlets ice hockey program in the Réseau du sport étudiant du Québec (RSEQ) of U Sports.

== Playing career ==
Known as Chech, she began playing hockey at the age of five after her brother took an interest.

=== College ===
Cecere played five years of college ice hockey with the McGill Martlets, during which time she helped her team win three CIS championships. In 20 games with the Martlets in the 2010–11 season, she earned eight points, with two goals and six assists.

=== CWHL ===
The 2011–12 season was her first season with the Stars de Montréal in the Canadian Women's Hockey League (CWHL). She collected 2 goals and 8 assists for a total of 10 points in 25 matches, while playing a more defensive role. In the final of the 2012 Clarkson Cup, Cecere netted the Stars' first goal.

== Awards and honours ==
International

- Universiade Gold Medal: 2009

CWHL

- Clarkson Cup Champion: 2012

College

- CIS National Championship Gold Medal: 2008, 2009, 2011
- CIS National Championship Silver Medal: 2007, 2010
- RSEQ Championship Winner: 2007, 2008, 2009, 2010, 2011

== Personal life ==
Cecere attended Centennial Regional High School and Dawson College prior to enrolling at McGill University in 2006. She graduated from McGill with a degree in physical education in 2011.

Cecere worked as a physical education teacher in the Montréal area until she was appointed a full-time associate coach for the McGill Martlets ice hockey team in 2014.
