= 2006–07 Canadian Interuniversity Sport women's ice hockey season =

The 2006–07 Canadian Interuniversity Sport women's ice hockey season began in October, ending with the 2007 CIS championship game in March, 2007. The tournament was won by the Alberta Pandas women's ice hockey program.

== Player stats ==
=== Scoring leaders ===
Player	Team	GP	G	A	Pts
Lindsay McAlpine	Alberta	24	27	30	57
Tarin Podloski	Alberta	22	19	31	50
Mariève Provost	Moncton	21	26	21	47
Valerie Boisclair	Moncton	22	20	21	41
Jenna Barber	Alberta	24	20	20	40

=== Leading goal scorers ===
Player	Team	G
Lindsay McAlpine	Alberta Pandas	27
Mariève Provost	Moncton Aigles Bleu	26
Valerie Boisclair	Moncton	20
Jenna Barber	Alberta Pandas	20
Tarin Podoloski	Alberta Pandas	19
Courtney Schriver	St. Mary's Huskies	19
Brayden Ferguson	St. Francis Xavier X-Women	17
Christina Davis	St. Francis Xavier X-Women	17
Vanessa Davidson	McGill Martlets	15

=== Goaltending leaders ===
Player	Team	GP	Min	GA	GAA	SO	W	L	T	Save %
Charline Labonté	McGill	18	1083:47	14	0.78	10	17	1	0	.959
Stephanie Lockert	Toronto	24	1462:18	35	1.44	7	15	6	3	.944
Holly Tarleton	Alberta	14	799:55	13	0.98	6	11	2	1	.929
Morgan Wielgosz	Laurier	13	764:28	13	1.02	4	10	1	2	.951
Danielle Le Ber	Western	24	1387:34	53	2.29	4	11	11	1	.923
Trina Pietersma	Lethbridge	21	1191:56	56	2.82	4	6	14	1	.911
Melinda Choi	UBC	18	1032:34	52	3.02	4	6	10	2	.912
Danielle Brunet	Saint Mary's	13	733:17	17	1.39	3	7	2	3	.933
Katie Harvieux	StFX	15	899:45	22	1.47	3	12	2	1	.921
Jackie Simonot	Regina	16	949:14	38	2.40	3	9	5	2	.901

== Awards and honors ==
- Brodrick Trophy, Lindsay McAlpine, Alberta Pandas
- Rookie of the Year, Catherine Ward, McGill Martlets
- Coach of the Year, Rheal Bordage, Moncton
- Marion Hillard Award, Taryn Barry, Alberta Pandas

=== All-Canadian teams ===
- First Team

Player	Position	Team
Charline Labonte	Goaltender	McGill Martlets
Andrea Beven	Defense	Laurier Golden Hawks
Catherine Ward	Defense	McGill Martlets
Lindsay McAlpine	Forward	Alberta Pandas
Marieve Prevost	Forward	Moncton
Vanessa Davidson	Forward	McGill Martlets

- Second Team

Player	Position	Team
Stephanie Lockert	Goaltender	Toronto Lady Blues
Marilynn Hay	Defense	St. Francis Xavier X-Women
Rayanne Reeve	Defense	Alberta Pandas
Kate Allgood	Forward	Brock
Tarin Podloski	Forward	Alberta Pandas
Christine Hartnoll	Forward	McGill Martlets

- All-Rookie Team

Player	Position	Team
Melinda Choy	Goaltender	UBC Thunderbirds
Catherine Ward	Defense	McGill Martlets
Marieve Prevost	Forward	Moncton

== CIS Playoffs ==
=== Pool A ===
Teams	Score
McGill vs. Manitoba	McGill, 4-1
Manitoba vs. Moncton	Manitoba, 4-1
McGill vs. Moncton	McGill, 8-0

=== Pool B ===
Teams	Score
Laurier vs. Ottawa	Laurier, 5-0
Alberta vs. Ottawa	Alberta, 5-0
Alberta vs. Laurier	Alberta, 6-4

=== Finals ===
Teams	Score	Notes
Moncton vs. Ottawa	Moncton, 6-5	5th place game
Manitoba vs. Laurier	Manitoba, 3-2	Bronze medal game
Alberta vs. McGill	Alberta, 4-0	Gold medal game

=== CIS Playoff All-Star team ===
Player	Position	Team
Holly Tarleton	Goaltender	Alberta Pandas
Rayanne Reeve	Defense	Alberta Pandas
Catherine Ward	Defense	McGill Martlets
Lindsay McAlpine	Forward	Alberta Pandas
Tarin Podloski	Forward	Alberta Pandas
Laurissa Kenworthy	Forward	Laurier Golden Hawks

== See also ==
- Canadian Interuniversity Sport women's ice hockey championship
- 2011–12 Canadian Interuniversity Sport women's ice hockey season
- 2009–10 Canadian Interuniversity Sport women's ice hockey season
