= Montreal Force =

Former women's professional ice hockey team in Montreal, Quebec

Montreal Force Force de Montréal
- City: Montreal, Quebec
- League: Premier Hockey Federation
- Founded: 2022
- Folded: 2023
- Home arena: Centre 21.02 (practice site only for 2022–23)
- Colours: Black, maroon, white
- Owner: BTM Partners
- General manager: Kevin Raphaël
- Head coach: Peter Smith
- Captain: Ann-Sophie Bettez

The Montreal Force (French: la Force de Montréal) were a professional ice hockey team in the Premier Hockey Federation (PHF), based in Montreal. The team was established in 2022 and debuted in the 2022–23 PHF season. The Force played only one season, as the PHF's assets were purchased, and the league dissolved, at season's end. This was part of the creation of a new, unified professional women's league, the Professional Women's Hockey League (PWHL).

== History ==
Montreal was long planned as a location for a PHF expansion franchise, but uncertainties due to the COVID-19 pandemic led the league to delay its plans. An expansion franchise was announced by the league in July 2022, with the owners announced as BTM Partners, which also owns three other PHF teams. The team's name, logo and jersey were revealed in a press release from the league the following month. Three uniforms were used during the inaugural season, one maroon with white stripes, one black with maroon stripes, and one white with maroon stripes, all with fleur-de-lis shoulder patches.

The team announced in September 2022 that Peter Smith would be the team's first head coach, with Pierre Alain as associate coach and Katia Clement-Heydra as assistant coach.

The team's first goal was scored in its inaugural match, a 5–4 shootout win against the Buffalo Beauts, by captain Ann-Sophie Bettez.

The Force did not have an official home, but instead played home games at select rinks across the province of Quebec, including the Aréna Raymond-Bourque in Montreal, the Colisée Financière Sun Life in Rimouski, the Aréna régional de la Rivière-du-Nord in Saint-Jérôme, and the Centre Premier Tech in Rivière-du-Loup; the team was also expected to play at venues in Gatineau, Quebec City, and Sept-Îles.

In June 2023, the PHF's assets were purchased and the league was ultimately wound down as part of the creation of the Professional Women's Hockey League, the first unified women's professional league in North America. In August, it was announced that Montreal had been awarded one of the six charter PWHL franchises. PWHL Montréal made its debut on January 2, 2024.

== Team ==
=== 2022–23 roster ===
As of January 20, 2023

No.	Nat	Player	Pos	S/G	Age	Acquired	Birthplace
4	(Canada)	Taylor Baker	D	R	29	2022	Toronto, Ontario
24	(Canada)	Ann-Sophie Bettez (C)	F	L	38	2022	Sept-Îles, Quebec
12	(Canada)	Catherine Daoust (A)	D	R	31	2022	L'Île-Bizard, Quebec
23	(Canada)	Gabrielle De Serres	D	R	28	2022	Mont-Royal, Quebec
18	(Canada)	Deziray De Sousa	F	L	28	2022	Montreal, Quebec
17	(Canada)	Christine Deaudelin	D	L	29	2022	Beloeil, Quebec
33	(Canada)	Tricia Deguire	G	L	29	2022	Sherbrooke, Quebec
9	(Canada)	Kim Deschênes	F	R	35	2022	Saint-Quentin, New Brunswick
39	(Canada)	Marie-Soleil Deschênes	G	R	32	2022	L'Île-Perrot, Quebec
27	(Canada)	Jade Downie-Landry	F	L	31	2022	St.-Jean-sur-Richelieu, Quebec
28	(Canada)	Catherine Dubois	F	L	31	2022	Quebec City, Quebec
64	(Canada)	Maude Gélinas	F	L	34	2022	St-Bruno-de-Montarville, Quebec
60	(United States)	Sally Hoerr	D	L	29	2022	Colchester, Vermont
25	(Canada)	Alyssa Holmes	F	R	27	2022	Hamilton, Ontario
8	(Canada)	Kaity Howarth	D	L	28	2022	Thunder Bay, Ontario
5	(Canada)	Samantha Isbell	F	L	28	2022	Thunder Bay, Ontario
29	(Canada)	Laura Jardin	F	L	25–26	2022	Calgary, Alberta
13	(Canada)	Alexandra Labelle	F	L	30	2022	St-Louis-de-Gonzague, Quebec
26	(Canada)	Brigitte Laganière	D	L	30	2022	Anjou, Quebec
16	(Canada)	Sarah Lefort (A)	F	L	32	2022	Ormstown, Quebec
	(Canada)	Autumn MacDougall	F	L	29	2023	Dartmouth, Nova Scotia
7	(Canada)	Kristina Shanahan	F	R	28	2022	Montreal, Quebec
3	(Canada)	Brooke Stacey	F	L	30	2022	Kahnawake, Quebec

Coaching staff and team personnel

- Head coach: Peter Smith
- Associate coach: Pierre Alain
- Assistant coach: Katia Clement-Heydra

=== Front office ===
As of October 11, 2022

- President: Kevin Raphaël
- Vice president: Emmanuel Anderson De Serres
- Ownership group: BTM Partners

== Season record ==
Note: GP = Games played, W = Wins, L = Losses, OTL = Overtime losses, SOL = Shootout losses, Pts = Points, GF = Goals for, GA = Goals against

Season	GP	W	L	OTL	SOL	Pts	GF	GA	Playoffs
2022–23	24	5	14	2	1	23	56	70	Did not qualify

== Awards and honors ==
- Laura Jardin, 2023 PHF Foundation Award
