= 2017 Clarkson Cup =

2017 ice hockey championship series

	1	Total
Calgary Inferno	1	1
Canadiennes de Montreal	3	3
- Location(s): Kingston, Ontario
- Dates: March 5, 2017
- Hall of Famers: Canadiennes: Caroline Ouellette (2023)

The 2017 Clarkson Cup was a women's ice hockey championship that was contested for the second straight year at Canadian Tire Centre in Ottawa, Ontario, to determine the champion of the Canadian Women's Hockey League. Held on March 5, 2017, the Calgary Inferno competed against the Canadiennes de Montreal, a rematch of the 2016 Clarkson Cup finals. This marked the first time that the same two teams skated in consecutive Clarkson Cup finals.

== Game summary ==
Scoring summary
Team	Goal	Assist(s)	Time	Score
1st period: Emerance Maschmeyer (Calgary) vs. Charline Labonte (Montreal)
Montreal	Katia Clement-Heydra (1) PPG	Noemie Marin (1), Karell Emard (1)	12:36	1-0, Montreal
2nd period: Emerance Maschmeyer (Calgary) vs. Charline Labonte (Montreal)
Montreal	Marie-Philip Poulin (1)	Cathy Chartrand (1), Julie Chu (1)	05:24	2-0, Montreal
3rd period: Maschmeyer (Calgary) vs. Labonte (Montreal)
Calgary	Jillian Saulnier (1)	Rebecca Johnston (1)	12:57	2-1, Montreal
Montreal	Marie-Philip Poulin (2) Empty Net	Julie Chu (2)	18:08	3-1, Montreal

== Canadiennes de Montreal – 2017 Clarkson Cup champions ==
Defenders

- 5 Lauriane Rougeau
- 6 Carly Hill
- 8 Cathy Chartrand (Assistant Captain)
- 14 Brittany Fouracres
- 17 Melanie Desrochers
- 21 Julie Chu
- 23 Sophie Brault
- 51 Cassandra Poudrier

Forwards

- 9 Kim Deschenes
- 10 Noemie Marin
- 11 Alyssa Sherrard
- 13 Caroline Ouellette (Assistant Captain)
- 16 Sarah Lefort
- 19 Katia Clement-Heydra
- 20 Jordanna Peroff
- 24 Ann-Sophie Bettez
- 29 Marie-Philip Poulin (Captain)
- 39 Marion Allemoz
- 47 Emmanuelle Blais
- 62 Emilie Bocchia
- 71 Leslie Oles
- 76 Karell Emard

Goaltenders

- 31 Catherine Herron
- 32 Charline Labonte

Coaching and Administrative Staff

- Dany Brunet (Head coach)
- Marc Beaudoin, Assistant coach
- Lisa-Marie Breton-Lebreux (Assistant coach)
- Kelly Sudia, Technical coach
- Gilles Charron, Goalie coach
- Jenny Lavigne, Assistant goalie coach
- Steve Lortie, Video coach

== Awards and honors ==
- Playoff MVP: Charline Labonte
- First Star of the Game: Charline Labonte
- Second Star of the Game: Marie-Philip Poulin
- Third Star of the Game: Jillian Saulnier
