= Catherine Ward =

Canadian ice hockey player (born 1987)

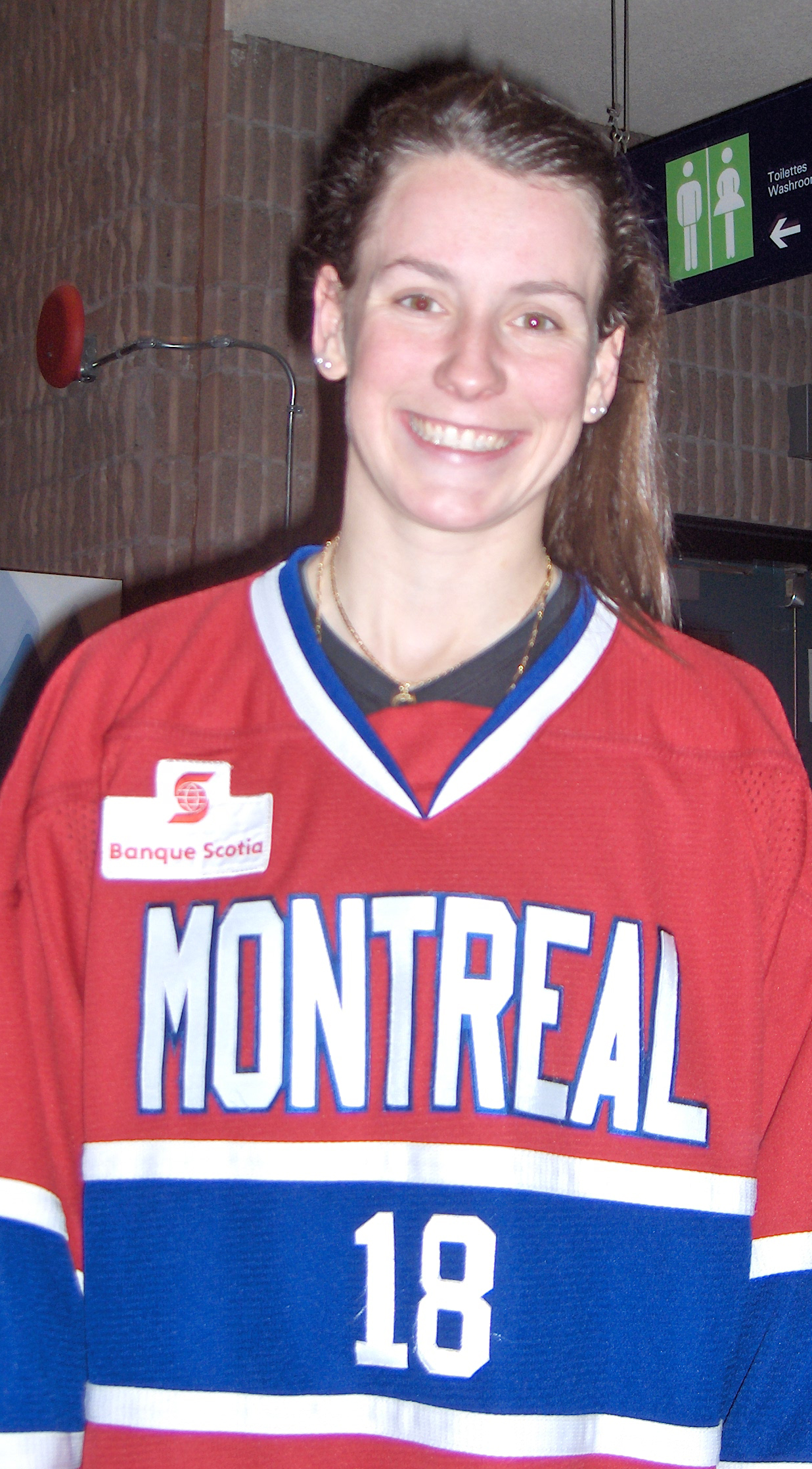
- Ward with the Montreal Stars in 2011
- Born: February 27, 1987 (age 39) Mount Royal, Quebec, Canada
- Height: 5 ft 6 in (168 cm)
- Weight: 150 lb (68 kg; 10 st 10 lb)
- Position: Defence
- Shot: Left
- Played for: Montreal Stars (CWHL); Boston University (NCAA); McGill University (CIS)
- National team: Canada
- Playing career: 2006–2014
Medal record
Women's ice hockey
Representing Canada
Olympic Games
Gold medal – first place	2010 Vancouver	Tournament
Gold medal – first place	2014 Sochi	Tournament
IIHF World Women's Championships
Gold medal – first place	2012 United States	Tournament
Silver medal – second place	2009 Finland	Tournament
Silver medal – second place	2011 Switzerland	Tournament
Silver medal – second place	2013 Canada	Tournament
MLP Nations Cup
Gold medal – first place	2007 Germany	Tournament
Gold medal – first place	2008 Germany	Tournament
Gold medal – first place	2009 Germany	Tournament

Catherine Ward (born February 27, 1987) is a member of the Canada women's national ice hockey team. She was also a member of the 2008–09 McGill Martlets women's hockey season, which won a Canadian Interuniversity Sport title. She was drafted 7th overall by the Montreal Stars in the 2011 CWHL Draft.

Ward established herself as one of Canada's stars on the blue line playing for the Canadian U22 team and for the 2009 Women's World Championship team and the 2010 Olympic gold medal winning team. While with Martlets at McGill University, Ward set a QSSF record for points by a defenseman, and in 2007 became the first Martlet to earn the CIS rookie-of-the-year honour since the inception of the award in 2001. She set new McGill single-season marks for most goals, assists and points in her varsity debut, finishing second among CIS defensemen with 22 points despite playing in only 16 conference games. She was a three-time CIS All-Canadian Defender and in 2009 won the CIS Women's Hockey Championship's MVP award. Ward also played one season in the NCAA as a Boston University Terrier, and was a 2011 Patty Kazmaier Award Nominee, Second Team All-American, NCAA Frozen Four All-Tournament team member, and a New England Women's Division I All-Star selection.

== Playing career ==
Ward played with Sarah Vaillancourt on Team Quebec at the 2003 Canada Winter Games. Ward would win silver at those Games. She played also for Montreal Axion in the National Women's Hockey League.

=== McGill Martlets ===
Ward played for the McGill Martlets women's ice hockey team from 2006 through 2010. During the 2008–09 season, Ward set a QSSF record for points (25) by a defenseman, beating her own record (22) that she had set in 2006–07. In 2007, she was the first Martlet to earn CIS rookie-of-the-year honours since the inception of the award in 2001. She was one of three Martlets in three years to be named as the top rookie in CIS women's hockey. This marked the first time in CIS history that players from the same school in a team sport were honoured as the nation's best freshman for three consecutive years. Ann-Sophie Bettez and Marie-Andree Leclerc-Auger received the award in 2007–08 and 2008–09. She set new McGill single-season marks for most goals, assists and points in her varsity debut, finishing second among CIS defencemen with 22 points despite playing in only 16 conference games. During her time at McGill, where she earned a bachelor's degree, the Martlets won two Canadian Interuniversity Sport national championships.

=== Hockey Canada ===
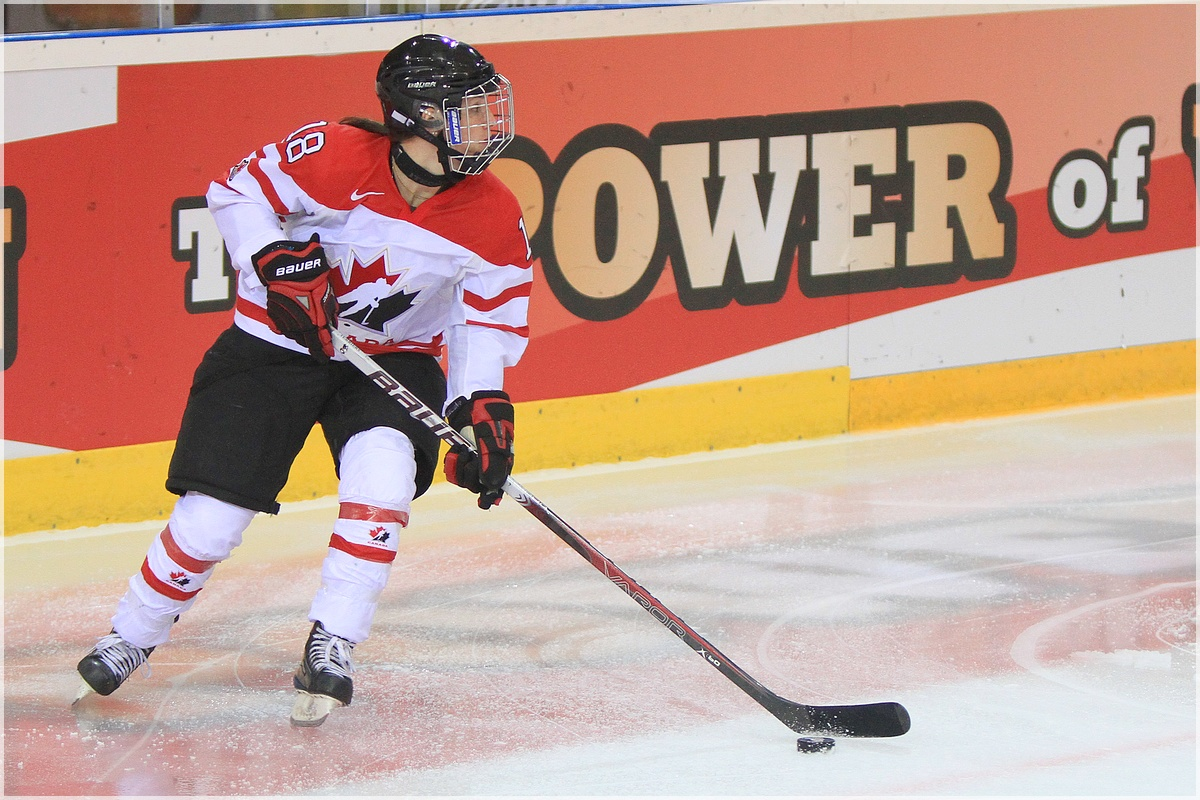
Ward at the 2011 IIHF Women's World Championship.

In 2007, she played for the Canadian Under-22 team on two occasions. She was a member of the European Air Canada Cup in Ravensburg, Germany, in January. She followed the victory by winning a three-game exhibition series against the US in Ottawa, in August. In 2009, Ward, and McGill teammate Charline Labonté represented Team Canada at the 2009 IIHF women's world hockey championship.

By claiming the gold medal at the 2012 IIHF Women's World Championship, Ward (along with Marie-Philip Poulin) became the sixth and seventh members of the (not yet recognized by the IIHF) Triple Gold Club for Women (having won gold in the Olympic Games, the IIHF World Championships, and the Clarkson Cup).

She was named to 2014 Olympic roster for Canada, serving as assistant captain and earning a second Olympic gold medal. Ward retired from the national team in September 2015 after sitting out the 2014-15 season to take a job as an assistant product manager for sticks with the equipment company CCM.

=== Boston University Terriers ===
Ward played for the Boston University Terriers women's ice hockey team from 2010 through 2011. She has been described as an explosive skater and a stylish playmaker. She helped the team secure a first-place finish in Hockey East with a 15–3–3 conference record and a remarkable 25–5–4 overall record. Ward has also recently been recognized as the Best Defenseman in Hockey East At season's end, Catherine Ward was the first ever Terrier to be named an All-American, as she was selected for the second team. While at Boston University, Ward finished her master's degree in business administration.

=== Montreal Stars ===
Ward played for the Montreal Stars in the Canadian Women's Hockey League from 2011 through 2013.

== Career stats ==
=== Hockey Canada ===
Event	Games Played	Goals	Assists	Points	PIM
2009 Women's World Championships	5	0	4	4	2
2010 Olympics	5	1	3	4	4

== Awards and honours ==
=== CIS ===
- McGill Athlete of the Week: Sep 29, 08 – Oct 5, 08
- McGill Most outstanding defenceman award 2009
- Won silver with Canada Under 22 team at the 2009 MLP Nations Cup in Germany
- CIS Rookie of the Year (Tissot Award), 2007
- CIS First Team All-Canadian 2007, Defence
- CIS First Team All-Canadian 2008, Defence
- CIS First Team All-Canadian 2009, Defence

- CIS Women's Hockey Championship, Most Valuable Player, 2009
- QSSF Rookie of the Year, 2007

=== NCAA ===
- 2011 Patty Kazmaier Award Nominee
- 2011 Second Team All-American
- 2011 NCAA Frozen Four All-Tournament team
- 2011 New England Women's Division I All-Star selection
