= Peter Smith (ice hockey) =

Canadian ice hockey coach

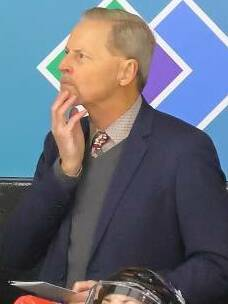
- Smith in 2022

Current position
- Title: Coaching mentor
- Team: McGill
- Conference: RSEQ

Biographical details
- Born: 27 March 1953 (age 73); Lachine, Quebec, Canada
- Education: McGill University

Playing career

Swimming
- 1975–1979: McGill Redbirds

Coaching career (HC unless noted)

Ice hockey
- 1999–2020: McGill Martlets

Head coaching record
- Overall: 534-229-33 (.671)

Accomplishments and honors

Championships
- 4 U Sports (2008, 2009, 2011, 2014)

Awards
- 3x U Sports Coach of the Year (2003, 2008, 2012); 9x RSEQ Coach of the Year (2003, 2006, 2007, 2008, 2009, 2011, 2012, 2014)

Records
- Most wins in McGill ice hockey history (534); Second-most wins in McGill history (534)
Medal record
Women's ice hockey
Representing Canada (as coach)
Olympic Games
Gold medal – first place	2006 Turin	Ice hockey
Gold medal – first place	2010 Vancouver	Ice hockey
World Championship
Gold medal – first place	2007 Canada
Silver medal – second place	2008 China
Silver medal – second place	2009 Finland

Peter Smith (born 27 March 1953) is a Canadian ice hockey coach and current coaching mentor of the McGill Redbirds and Martlets programs at McGill University in Montreal. He was the head coach of the McGill Martlets ice hockey program for twenty seasons, during 1999 to 2020, and is the winningest coach in McGill ice hockey history. Smith amassed a 534-229-33 (.671) career record behind the McGill bench.

Over his four national championship seasons, the team posted a combined 131-5-0 record against Canadian university opponents.

The 2007-08 title marked the first McGill women's team in any sport to capture a CIS / U SPORTS championship. The next season, the Martlets repeated as national champs, going undefeated in league (18-0) and post-season action (7-0) for the second straight year. The third crown was won in 2010-11, when the Martlets went 33-0 against CIS teams, including a 20-0 record in league play and a 7-0 mark in post-season play. The fourth title was in 2013-14, when the Martlets registered a 29-4 mark against CIS teams, including 18-2 in league play and 6-2 in the post-season.

On June 13, 2018, it was announced that the 2007-08 Martlets team would be inducted into the McGill Sports Hall of Fame on October 11, 2018.

A native of Lachine, Quebec, Smith was the head coach of the Canadian national women's hockey team for the 2007–08 international season, in addition to serving as an assistant coach with Team Canada under Melody Davidson for five seasons. He won two Olympic gold medals during his international coaching career, in the women's ice hockey tournament at the 2006 Winter Olympics in Turin, Italy and in the women's ice hockey tournament at the 2010 Winter Olympics in Vancouver, Canada.
