= Gillian Ferrari =

Canadian women's ice hockey player (born 1980)

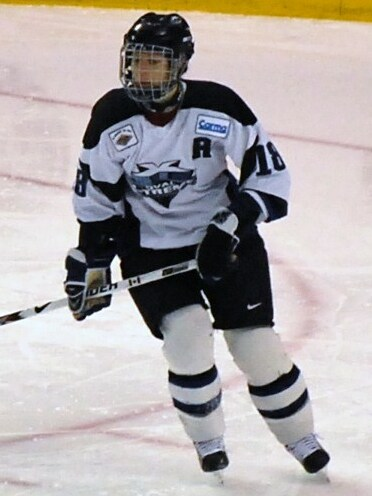
- Ferrari with the Calgary Oval X-Treme in 2009
- Born: June 23, 1980 (age 46) Thornhill, Ontario, Canada
- Height: 5 ft 8 in (173 cm)
- Weight: 154 lb (70 kg; 11 st 0 lb)
- Position: Defence
- Shoots: Right
- NWHL WWHL team: Brampton Thunder (2004-05); Calgary Oval X-Treme (2007-09)
- National team: Canada
- Playing career: 2000–present
Medal record
Representing Canada
Women's ice hockey
Olympic Games
Gold medal – first place	2006 Turin	Tournament
IIHF World Women's Championships
Gold medal – first place	2004 Canada	Tournament
Gold medal – first place	2007 Canada	Tournament
Silver medal – second place	2008 China	Tournament
Silver medal – second place	2009 Finland	Tournament

Gillian Ferrari (born June 23, 1980 in Thornhill, Ontario) is a Canadian women's ice hockey player. She was inducted into the Brampton Sports Hall of Fame in 2006. Her mother is from Wales and her father was born in Italy.

== Playing career ==
As a child, her parents tried to sign her up for hockey and the Community Centre insisted she take figure skating. She was able to play hockey the year after Justine Blainey won a court case allowing girls to play on boys' hockey in 1986.

=== Brampton Thunder ===
Ferrari began playing with the Brampton Thunder of the National Women’s Hockey League (NWHL) in the 2004-2005 season. Her lifetime stats in the NWHL in 79 games include 10 goals, 36 assists and 76 penalty minutes. In the 2004-05 season, she recorded three goals and 22 assists in 34 games. She was part of an NWHL Central Division Champion.

=== Esso Nationals ===
Ferrari participated in the Esso Women’s Nationals on numerous occasions. Her first experience at the Nationals was in 1998 and 1999 with Team Ontario. In 2000 and 2004, she would compete with Team Ontario and claim gold at the Nationals. In 2005, Ferrari played with the Brampton Thunder and participated in the Esso Women’s Nationals as part of Team Ontario with the Thunder. At the tournament, Ferrari would win the silver. In 2007, Ferrari would enjoy double gold as she relocated to Calgary. The Calgary Oval X-Treme won the 2007 WWHL crown, and then represented Alberta at the Esso Women’s Nationals. At the Nationals, Team Alberta would claim gold. In 2009, Ferrari was part of the Calgary roster that qualified for the Clarkson Cup semifinals.

=== Hockey Canada ===
She has played for Team Ontario Under 17 Team, and Team Canada’s Under 22 team. She also won a gold medal in 2002 and 2005 and one silver medal in 2003 in three Four Nations Cup Championships. Gillian has also been a three time ESSO National Champion.

Ferrari played defence for the Canadian women's team in the Winter Olympics in 2006. She has also won two gold medals with Canada at the Women's World Hockey Championships. Ferrari was one of the final cuts for Team Canada leading up to the 2010 Winter Olympics in Vancouver, British Columbia.

=== McGill Martlets ===
On September 18, 2010, Ferrari, in her first-year with the Martlets, scored her first-ever CIS goal. It was on a 4-on-3 power play versus Wilfrid Laurier University. On December 31, Ferrari was credited with the game-winner on the power-play at 5:49 of the first period in the final game of the Bisons Holiday Classic tournament at Max Bell Arena. McGill defeated the nationally ranked fifth overall Alberta Pandas by a 3-0 mark During the 2011–12 McGill Martlets women's ice hockey season, she was named an alternate captain.
