= Ann-Sophie Bettez =

Canadian ice hockey player (born 1987)

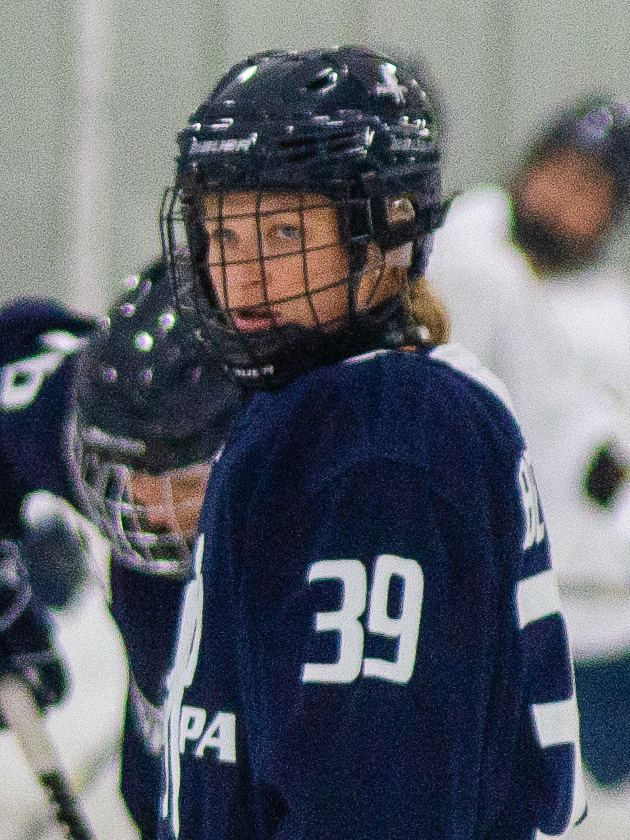
- Bettez in 2019
- Born: October 14, 1987 (age 39) Sept-Îles, Quebec, Canada
- Height: 5 ft 4 in (163 cm)
- Weight: 130 lb (59 kg; 9 st 4 lb)
- Position: Forward
- Shoots: Left
- PWHL team: Montreal Victoire
- Played for: Montreal Force; Les Canadiennes de Montréal; McGill Martlets
- National team: Canada
- Playing career: 2007–present
Medal record
Women's ice hockey
Representing Canada
World Championships
Silver medal – second place	2009 Finland
Bronze medal – third place	2019 Finland
Winter Universiade
Gold medal – first place	2011 Turkey	Team

Ann-Sophie Bettez (born October 14, 1987) is a Canadian professional ice hockey forward that played for the Montreal Victoire of the Professional Women's Hockey League (PWHL).

== Playing career ==
=== CIS ===
She was CIS rookie of the year in 2008 and voted league MVP in her second year. She won the 2009 QSSF scoring crown with 24 goals and 30 assists for 54 points in just 18 conference games. These numbers set league records in each category. She was seven points back of Alberta Pandas player Tarin Podloski (23–38–61) for the CIS national scoring title.

In 2008, Bettez was one of three Martlets in three years to be named as the top rookie in Canadian Interuniversity Sport women's ice hockey championship. This marked the first time in CIS history that players from the same school in a team sport were honoured as the nation's best freshman for three consecutive years. Catherine Ward and Marie-Andree Leclerc-Auger received the award in 2006–07 and 2008–09.

On February 14, 2010, Bettez had two goals and defenceman Cathy Chartrand added three assists as the No.1-ranked McGill won for the 78th consecutive outing, blanking Concordia 3–0 in women's hockey at the Ed Meagher Arena. It marked McGill's 32nd straight win over the Stingers, who haven't scored against the Martlets in more than six regular season games, dating back to a 16–1 McGill win on November 15, 2007.

During the 2011–12 McGill Martlets women's ice hockey season, she was named an alternate captain. Anne-Sophie Bettez was chosen player by excellence of the season 2011–2012. The player ended the season in the second rank with a harvest of 13 goals and 24 assists for 37 points in 20 games. It is the second time When Anne-Sophie Bettez receives this honor. She had been named an athlete par excellence in 2008–2009 season besides removing recruit's title of the year in 2007–2008.

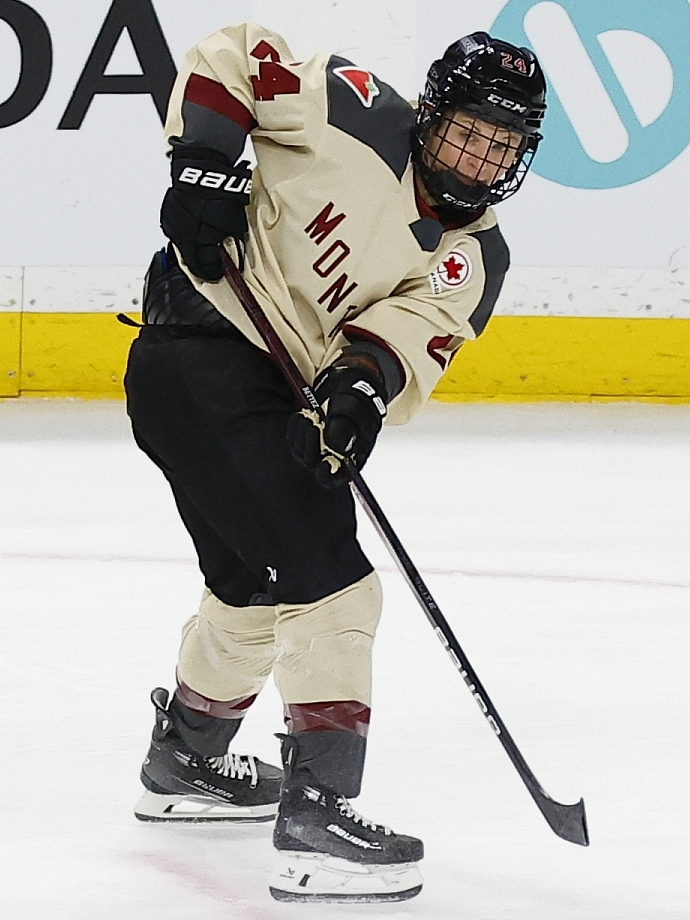
Bettez with PWHL Montreal in 2024

=== PWHL ===
Bettez was drafted in the 14th round of the 2023 PWHL Draft by Montreal. She announced her retirement from the league on 11 October 2024

=== Hockey Canada ===
Her first experience with Hockey Canada was in 2007. She attended Canada's national women's under-22 team selection camp in Toronto in August 2007. The following year, she attended Canada's national women's under-22 team evaluation camp in Calgary. In August 2008, she played for Canada's national women's under-22 team in a three-game exhibition against the US, in Pierrefonds, Quebec.

In 2009, she won a silver medal with Team Canada at the 2009 MLP Cup in Germany. She had three points in the four game tournament. Bettez was named to Canadian national team roster for the IIHF world championship in Hämeenlinna, Finland. She was part of the roster that won a silver medal. In January 2010, she won a gold medal at the MLP Cup in Germany. In March 2011, she was invited to the Canada women's national ice hockey team selection camp to determine the final roster for the 2011 IIHF Women's World Championship. At the 2011 Winter Universiade, Ann-Sophie Bettez scored two goals in a 14–0 shutout of Great Britain (contested on January 30, 2011 at Cemal Gursel Arena). With the win, Canada improved to 3–0 in the tournament. Bettez scored one of the four Team Canada goals in its gold medal triumph at the 2011 Winter Universiade.

== Hockey Canada ==
- Team Canada U-22 (won MLP Nations Cup in Germany, 2009))
- Team Canada (won silver at IIHF World Championships contested in Finland in April 2009)

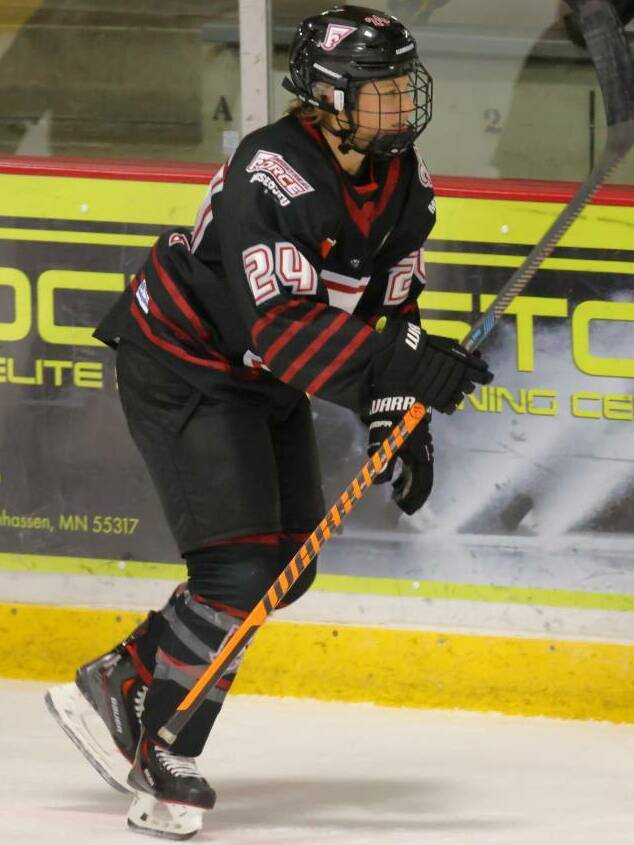
Bettez with the Montreal Force in 2022

== Awards and honours ==
=== All-Canadian ===
- All-Canadian First Team (2008–09)
- All-Canadian First Team (2011–12)
- All-Canadian Second Team (2007–08)
- All-Canadian Second Team (2009–10)

=== CIS ===
- CIS All-Rookie Team (2007–08)
- CIS Rookie of the Year (2008)
- Tournament All-star (CIS Championship, 2009)
- 2010 CIS Tournament championship player of the game: Ann-Sophie Bettez (McGill Martlets)
- CIS Player of the Year (Brodick Trophy) (2011–12)
- BLG Award (CIS Female Athlete of the Year) 2011–12

=== QSSF ===
- Conference All-Rookie Team (2008)
- Conference All-star (2007–08)
- Conference All-star (2008–09)
- Conference All-star (2009–10)
- Conference Player of the Year (2009)
- Conference Rookie of the Year (2008)
- Conference Scoring Leader (2008)
- Conference Scoring Leader (2009)
- Conference Player of the year (Athlète féminine par excellence)(2012)
- Conference All-star (First Team) (2011–12)

=== McGill ===
- McGill Hockey MVP (2009, co-winner with Charline Labonte)
- McGill Hockey Rookie of the Year (2008)
- Tournament All-star (Theresa Humes Tourney, 2008)
- McGill Athlete of Week: (Week of February 15, 2010)
- McGill Athlete of Week: (Week of January 2, 2010)
- McGill Athlete Of Week: (Week of November 10, 2009)
- McGill Athlete Of Week: (Week of January 11, 2009)
- McGill Athlete Of Week: (Week of November 16, 2008)
- McGill Athlete Of Week: (Week of November 9, 2008)
- McGill Athlete Of Week: (Week of October 19, 2008)
- McGill Athlete Of Week: (Week of March 2, 2008)
- McGill Athlete Of Week: (Week of January 6, 2008)

=== CWHL ===
- 2013 CWHL Rookie of the Year
- 2014 Angela James Bowl winner (awarded to CWHL scoring champion)
- Second Star of the Game, 2019 Clarkson Cup

=== PHF ===
- PHF Three Stars of the Week Award (Awarded November 28)

== Career stats ==
=== CIS ===
Year	GP	G	A	PTS	PIM
2007–08	42	29	40	69	24
2008–09	37	36	50	86	18
2009–10	18	22	8	30	4
Total	97	87	98	185	46

=== Hockey Canada ===
Year	Event	GP	G	A	PTS
2008	Exhibition (vs. USA)	2	1	1	2
2009	MLP Cup	4	1	2	3
2009	U22 Selection camp	2	0	2	2
2010	MLP Cup	5	1	3	4
Total		13	3	8	11
