= 2008–09 McGill Martlets women's ice hockey season =

Canadian Interuniversity Sport women's ice hockey championship, Champions
- Conference: QSSF

Record

Coaches and captains
- Head coach: Peter Smith
- Captain: Chantal Gauvin
- Alternate captain(s): Alyssa Cecere, Cathy Chartrand, Vanessa Davidson

The McGill Martlets represented McGill University in the 2008-09 Canadian Interuniversity Sport women's hockey season. The Martlets posted an unblemished 33-0 record against CIS opponents to go undefeated for the second straight season en route to capturing another CIS banner. Catherine Ward, Chantal Gauvin and goaltender Kalie Townsend were the only graduating players from the Martlets.

== Exhibition ==
Date	Time	Result	Opponent
Sep. 19, 2008	7:00 PM	Won * 5-1	York
Sep. 20, 2008	2:00 PM	Won * 2-0	Windsor

=== Alberta Panda Presence Pre-season Tournament ===
(3 games @ Edmonton)

Date	Time	Result	Opponent
Sep. 26, 2008	1:00 PM	Won * 4-1	Regina
Sep. 27, 2008	11:45 AM	Won * 5-1	Lethbridge
Sep. 28, 2008	11:45 AM	Won * 3-2	Alberta

=== NCAA Exhibition ===
Date	Time	Result	Opponent
Oct. 3, 2008	7:00 PM	Lost * 4-5	St. Lawrence
Oct. 5, 2008	7:00 PM	Won * 1-0	Vermont
Oct. 24, 2008	7:00 PM	Won * 3-2	Dartmouth
Oct. 25, 2008	4:00 PM	Lost * 2-3	Harvard
Oct. 26, 2008	1:30 PM	Won * 2-1	Yale
Feb. 24, 2009	7:00 PM	Won * 4-2	Syracuse University

== Regular season ==
=== Roster ===
Number	Name	Position	Height	Year
24	Ann-Sophie Bettez	Forward	5'4"	2
09	Julie Casavecchia	Forward	5'7"	2
14	Alyssa Cecere	Forward	5'7"	3
08	Cathy Chartrand	Defence	5'10"	2
25	Vanessa Davidson	Forward	5'8"	4
19	Chantal Gauvin	Defence	5'8" T	5
06	Caroline Hill	Forward	5'5"	3
22	Marie-Andree Leclerc-Auger	Forward	5'5"	1*
07	Alessandra Lind-Kenny	Forward	5'6"	2
11	Rebecca Martindale	Forward	5'5"	4
10	Jordanna Peroff	Forward	5'6"	2
16	Shaunn Rabinovich	Defence	5'9"	1*
18	Jasmine Sheehan	Defence	5'5"	3
20	Lainie Smith	Forward	5'6"	1*
30	Gabrielle Smith	Goal	5'8"	4
21	Amy Soberano	Forward	5'4"	3
02	Stacie Tardif	Defence	5'5"	1*
29	Kalie Townsend	Goal	5'10"	5
17	Catherine Ward	Defence	5'6"	3
23	Victoria Wells	Forward	5'7"	2
13	Alexandra Wells	Forward	5'7"	2
15	Lisa Zane	Defence	5'4"	3

=== Schedule ===
The Martlets participated in the Theresa Humes Tournament at Concordia University from January 2–4.

Date	Time	Result	Opponent
Oct. 17, 2008	7:00 PM	Won 6-0	@ Carleton
Oct. 19, 2008	3:00 PM	Won 10-0	Concordia
Oct. 31, 2008	7:30 PM	Won 5-0	Concordia
Nov. 1, 2008	6:00 PM	Won 6-4	Ottawa
Nov. 8, 2008	7:00 PM	Won 6-1	@ Carleton
Nov. 15, 2008	2:30 PM	Won 16-1	Concordia
Nov. 20, 2008	7:00 PM	Won * 8-0	St. Mary's
Nov. 21, 2008	7:00 PM	Won * 5-1	St. Francis Xavier
Nov. 22, 2008	3:00 PM	Won * 10-3	Dalhousie
Nov. 29, 2008	7:00 PM	Won 9-0	Ottawa
Jan. 2, 2009	2:00 PM	Won * 4-0	Queen's
Jan. 3, 2009	12:30 PM	Won * 8-2	Ottawa
Jan. 4, 2009	3:30 PM	Won * 9-0	Toronto
Jan. 10, 2009	7:00 PM	Won 6-2	@ Carleton
Jan. 17, 2009	2:30 PM	Won 10-0	Concordia
Jan. 18, 2009	1:00 PM	Won 8-1	@ Carleton
Jan. 24, 2009	2:00 PM	Won 8-0	Ottawa
Feb. 1, 2009	1:00 PM	Won 4-0	@ Carleton
Feb. 7, 2009	7:00 PM	Won 7-0	Concordia
Feb. 8, 2009	6:00 PM	Won 3-1	Ottawa
Feb. 14, 2009	2:00 PM	Won 4-2	Ottawa
Feb. 15, 2009	1:00 PM	Won 4-2	@ Carleton
Feb. 21, 2009	7:00 PM	Won 5-0	Ottawa
Feb. 28, 2009	7:00 PM	Won 6-0	Concordia

== Player stats ==
Rebecca Martindale, a 21-year-old education senior, posted a career-best 18 goals, 16 assists (34 points) in 42 games. Martindale doubled her points output from the previous season (42 games, 8 goals, 12 assists, 20 points). Chantal Gauvin, scored once and added 13 assists. She finished her McGill career with 7 goals, 29 assists and 36 points in 143 career contests.

== Postseason ==
=== QSSF Tournament ===
- Semifinals

Date	Time	Result	Opponent
Mar. 4, 2009	7:00 PM	Won 11-2	Concordia
Mar. 6, 2009	7:30 PM	Won 4-1	Concordia

- Finals (for Ed Enos Trophy)

Date	Time	Result	Opponent
Mar. 11, 2009	7:00 PM	Won 7-0	Ottawa
Mar. 13, 2009	7:00 PM	Won 7-1	Ottawa

=== CIS Tournament ===
Date	Time	Result	Opponent
Mar. 19, 2009	6:30 PM	Won 2-1 (OT)	Manitoba
Mar. 21, 2009	6:30 PM	Won 5-1	St. Francis Xavier
Mar. 22, 2009	6:00 PM	Won 3-1	Wilfrid Laurier

== Awards and honors ==
- Ann-Sophie Bettez, Athlete of the Week: Jan 6, 08
- Ann-Sophie Bettez, Athlete of the Week: Mar 2, 08
- Ann-Sophie Bettez, Athlete of the Week: Oct 19, 08
- Ann-Sophie Bettez, Athlete of the Week: Nov 9, 08
- Ann-Sophie Bettez, Athlete of the Week: Nov 16, 08
- Ann-Sophie Bettez, Athlete of the Week: Jan 11, 09
- Cathy Chartrand, Athlete of the Week: Dec 29, 08 – Jan 04, 09
- Vanessa Davidson, Athlete of the Week: Mar 02, 09 – Mar 08, 09
- Marie-Andree Leclerc-Auger, Athlete of the Week: Feb 16, 09 – Feb 22, 09
- Marie-Andree Leclerc-Auger, CIS Rookie of the Year
  - Leclerc-Auger became the third member of the Martlets in three years to be named as the top rookie in CIS women's hockey. This marked the first time in CIS history that players from the same school in a team sport were honoured as the nation's best freshman for three consecutive years. Catherine Ward and Ann-Sophie Bettez received the award in 2006-07 and 2007-08.
- Charline Labonté, nominee BLG Award (honouring the top CIS female and male athletes for the 2008-09 season)
- Jordana Perroff, Athlete of the Week: Feb 09, 09 – Feb 15, 09
- Catherine Ward, Athlete of the Week: Sep 29, 08 – Oct 05, 08

=== Team awards ===
- Goaltender Charline Labonté and forward Ann-Sophie Bettez of Sept-Iles, Que., shared the honor as co-MVPs of the McGill women's hockey team
- Chantal Gauvin, Most dedicated player honours.
- Marie-Andrée Leclerc-Auger, earned Martlets rookie-of-the-year honours
- Marie-Andrée Leclerc-Auger, Martlets top sniper.
- Rebecca Martindale, Most improved player
- Catherine Ward, Most outstanding defenceman award.
- Catherine Ward won silver with Canada Under 22 team at the 2009 MLP Nations Cup in Germany

=== All-Canadian honors ===
- Goaltender - Charline Labonté, First Team
- Defence - Catherine Ward, First Team
- Forward - Ann-Sophie Bettez, First Team
- Defence - Cathy Chartrand, Second Team
- Forward - Vanessa Davidson, Second Team
- Forward - Marie-Andrée Leclerc-Auger, All-Rookie Team
