= Charline Labonté =

Canadian ice hockey player (born 1982)

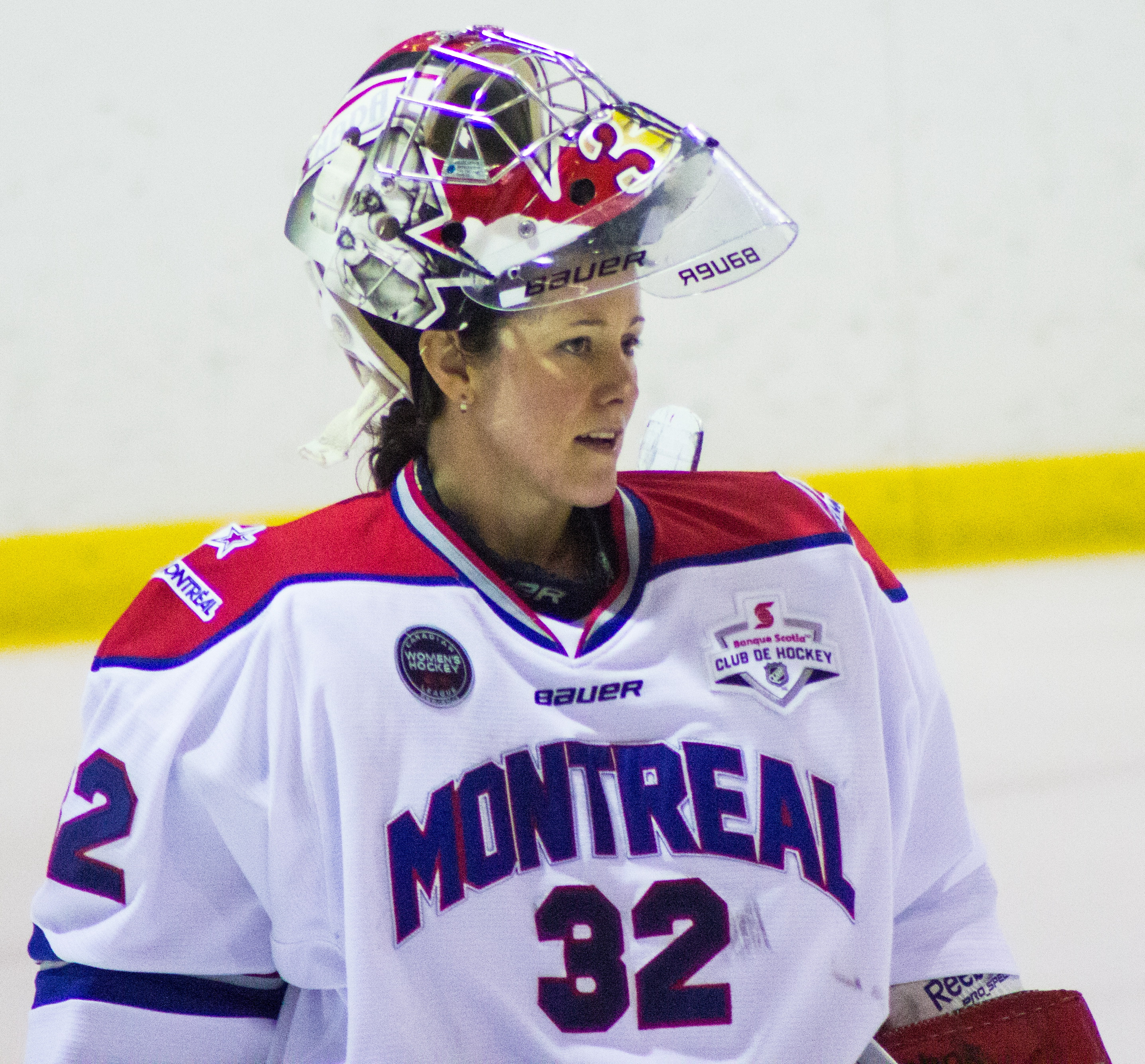
- Labonté during a Montreal Stars game in November 2014
- Born: October 15, 1982 (age 44) Greenfield Park, Quebec, Canada
- Height: 5 ft 9 in (175 cm)
- Weight: 157 lb (71 kg; 11 st 3 lb)
- Position: Goaltender
- Caught: Left
- Played for: Les Canadiennes de Montreal (CWHL); McGill University (CIS)
- National team: Canada
- Playing career: 2000–2017
Medal record
Olympic Games
| Gold medal – first place | 2006 Turin | Team |
| Gold medal – first place | 2010 Vancouver | Team |
| Gold medal – first place | 2014 Sochi | Team |
World Championships
| Gold medal – first place | 2007 Canada |
| Gold medal – first place | 2012 United States |
| Silver medal – second place | 2005 Sweden |
| Silver medal – second place | 2008 China |
| Silver medal – second place | 2009 Finland |
| Silver medal – second place | 2011 Switzerland |
| Silver medal – second place | 2013 Canada |
| Silver medal – second place | 2016 Canada |
Women's inline hockey
FIRS World Championship
| Gold medal – first place | 2004 Canada |

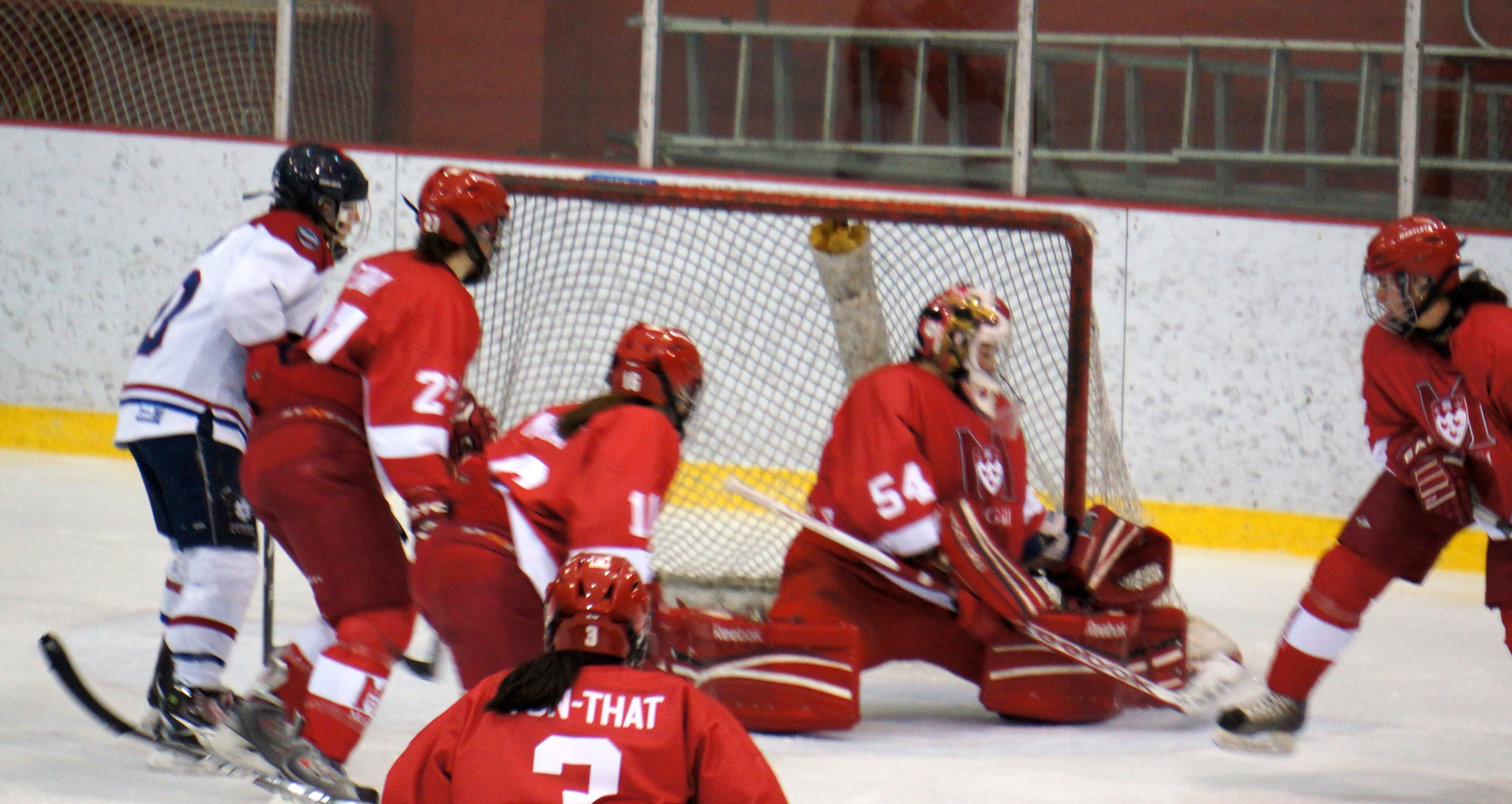
Labonté with McGill Martlets

Charline Labonté (born October 15, 1982) is a Canadian former professional ice hockey player. Labonté played professionally for the Montreal Stars/Les Canadiennes de Montreal of the Canadian Women's Hockey League. She was a member of the Canada women's national ice hockey team that won three gold medals at the Olympics and two gold medals in the World Championships. She is an alumna of the McGill Martlets hockey program.

Labonté now lives in Montreal, and graduated from McGill University with a degree in Physical Education. Labonté was named to the 2014 Olympic roster for Canada. She would be the winning goaltender for Les Canadiennes de Montreal in the final of the 2017 Clarkson Cup. In September 2017, she retired from Les Canadiennes and the Canadian national hockey team, as the goalie ranking second most all-time in games won (45), shutouts (16), and games played for Canada, with four Olympic gold medals, 2 world championship wins and 6 world silver medals.

== Playing career ==
=== Hockey Canada ===
Labonté was one of two goaltenders playing for the Canadian women's hockey team in the 2006 Turin olympics. At the Torino Games, Labonte and Kim St. Pierre allowed a combined two goals in five games played. Labonte logged 180 minutes of ice time and led all goaltenders with a goals against average of 0.33 and a save percentage of .976, respectively. In 2010, she served as the third goaltender for the gold medal-winning Canadian women's team. Prior to this she played for the Montreal Axion and Laval Le Mistral, Teams of the National Women's Hockey League. She was awarded Top Goaltender honours at the 2009 world championships.

=== QMJHL ===
She was one of the few women to play Major Junior hockey, appearing in 28 games with the Acadie-Bathurst Titan of the Quebec Major Junior Hockey League between 1999 and 2000. Her play for the QMJHL club was featured on a hockey card issued by Upper Deck in their 1999–2000 UD Prospects set (card #54). She competed for Team Quebec at the 1999 Canada Winter Games. She was a member of the Montreal Axion in 2004–05, and one of her teammates was fellow Olympian Gina Kingsbury.

=== McGill Martlets ===
With McGill, she competed in five CIS National tournaments. On December 31, 2010, Labonte required only 13 saves to post her 59th career shutout with McGill as the Martlets defeated the nationally ranked fifth overall Alberta Pandas by a 3–0 mark in the final game of the Bisons Holiday Classic tournament at Max Bell Arena. In the game, the Martlets held a 31–13 edge in shots. Gillian Ferrari was credited with the game-winner on the power-play at 5:49 of the first period. Jasmine Sheehan, a fifth-year defender scored the second goal of the game. Logan Murray, a freshman from Calgary, scored the last goal of the contest. In an October 29, 2011 contest against the Montreal Carabins, Ariane Barker scored on Labonte with 71 seconds left in a 3–2 win versus McGill. Labonte took the loss for the Martlets, giving her a 69–2 overall record in her CIS career. It marked the Martlets first loss to a Quebec conference opponent for the first time in 108 games.

=== Inline hockey ===
Also a member of the Canada women's national inline hockey team, winning a gold medal at the 2004 FIRS Inline Hockey World Championships, some of her teammates on the roster included fellow Hockey Canada alumnae Meghan Agosta, Amanda Benoit-Wark, Isabelle Chartrand, Cherie Piper and Amy Turek.

== Awards and honours ==
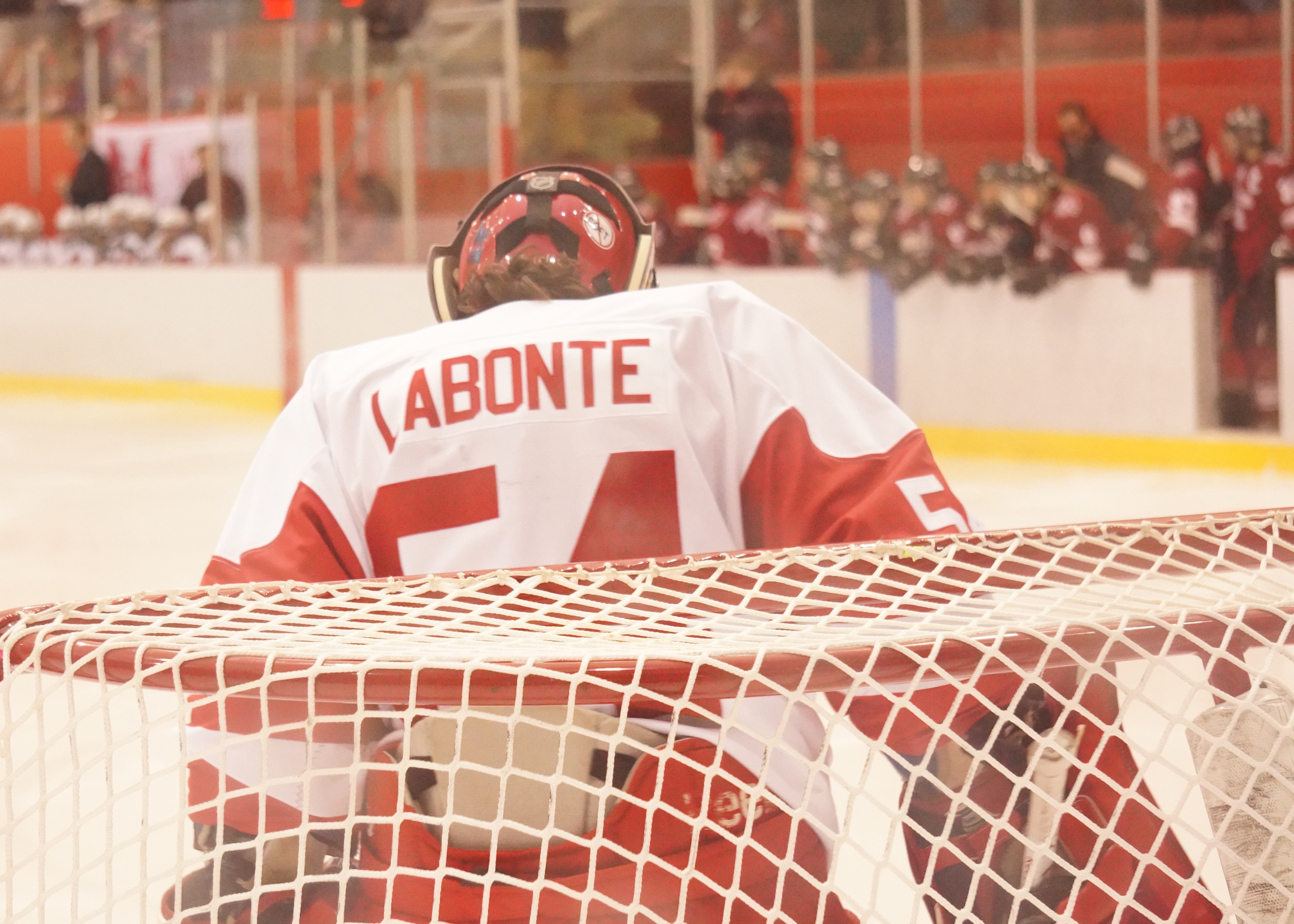

- Top Goaltender, 2006 Esso Women's National Hockey Championship Pool A: Charline Labonte
- Top Goaltender, 2009 world championships
- 2011-12 RSEQ FIRST ALL-STAR TEAM: Charline Labonté
- 2015 CWHL Goaltender of the Year Award

== Career statistics ==
=== International ===
| Year | Team | Event | Result | GP | W | L | T/OT | MIN | GA | SO | GAA | SV% |
|---|---|---|---|---|---|---|---|---|---|---|---|---|
| 2006 | Canada | OG | 1st place, gold medalist(s) | 3 | 3 | 0 | 0 | 180:00 | 1 | 2 | 0.33 | 0.976 |
| 2010 | Canada | OG | 1st place, gold medalist(s) | 1 | 0 | 0 | 0 | 20:00 | 1 | 0 | 3.00 | 0.889 |
| 2014 | Canada | OG | 1st place, gold medalist(s) | 2 | 2 | 0 | 0 | 120:00 | 2 | 1 | 1.00 | 0.951 |

== Personal life ==
In June 2014, Labonte publicly came out. Attended the Cami Granato invitational in 2023.

| Preceded by Noora Räty (2007, 2008) | IIHF World Women's Championships Best Goalie; 2009 | Succeeded by Noora Räty (2011) |
| Preceded by DeLayne Brian (2014) | 2015 Goaltender of the Year Award winner (2015) | Succeeded by To Be Determined (2016) |
| Preceded by DeLayne Brian (2016) | Most Valuable Player, Clarkson Cup Playoffs (2017) | Succeeded by Erica Howe (2018) |
