= Jocelyne Larocque =

Canadian ice hockey player (born 1988)

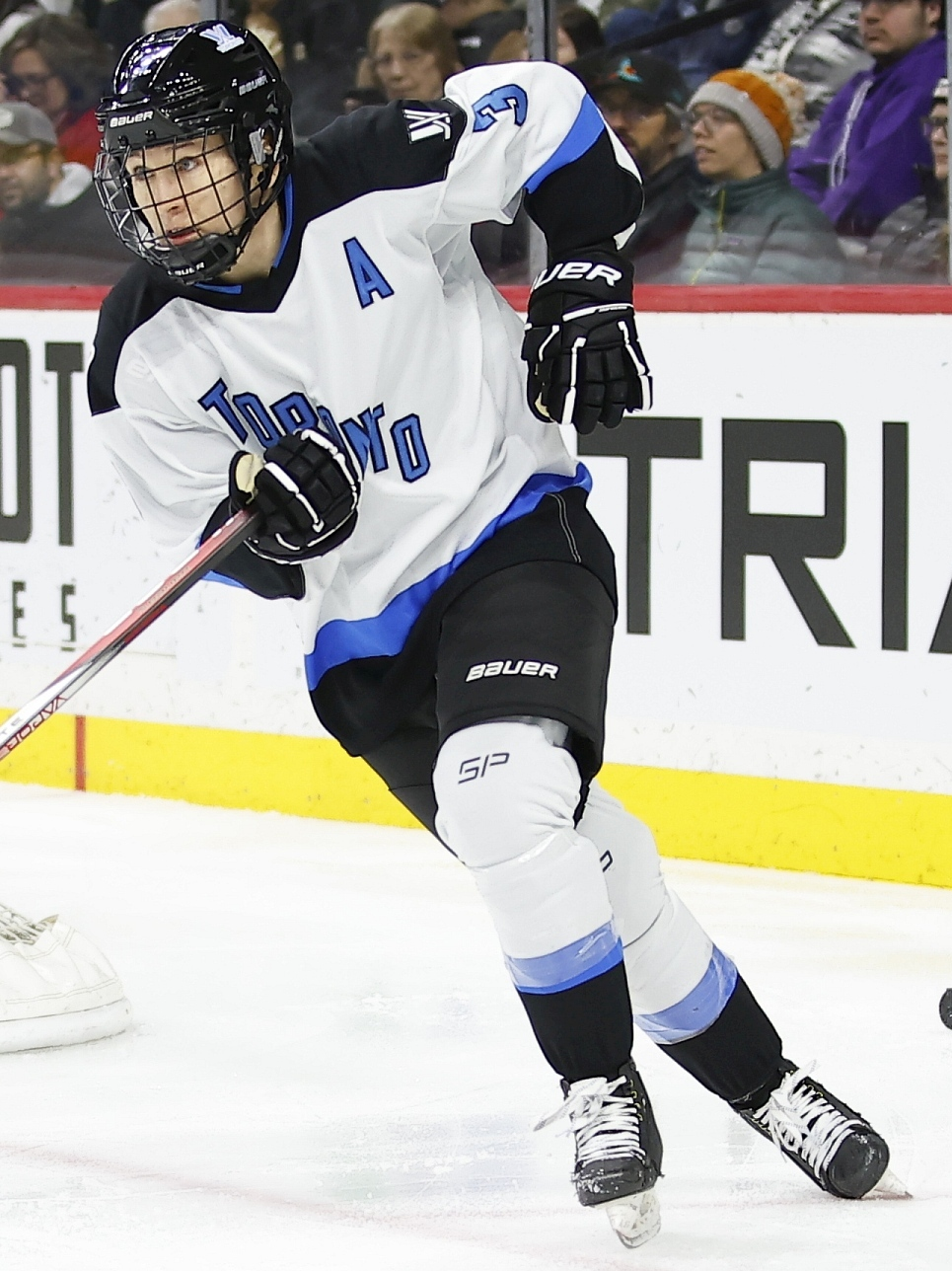
- Larocque with PWHL Toronto in 2024
- Born: May 19, 1988 (age 38) Ste. Anne, Manitoba, Canada
- Height: 5 ft 6 in (168 cm)
- Weight: 146 lb (66 kg; 10 st 6 lb)
- Position: Defence
- Shoots: Left
- PWHL team Former teams: Ottawa Charge: Adidas; Calgary Oval X-Treme; Minnesota Duluth Bulldogs; Manitoba Maple Leafs; Calgary Inferno; Markham Thunder; Toronto Sceptres
- National team: Canada
- Playing career: 2004–present
Medal record
Women's ice hockey
Representing Canada
Olympic Games
Gold medal – first place	2014 Sochi	Team
Gold medal – first place	2022 Beijing	Team
Silver medal – second place	2018 Pyeongchang	Team
Silver medal – second place	2026 Milano Cortina	Team
World Championships
Gold medal – first place	2012 United States
Gold medal – first place	2021 Canada
Gold medal – first place	2022 Denmark
Gold medal – first place	2024 United States
Silver medal – second place	2011 Switzerland
Silver medal – second place	2013 Canada
Silver medal – second place	2015 Sweden
Silver medal – second place	2016 Canada
Silver medal – second place	2017 United States
Silver medal – second place	2023 Canada
Silver medal – second place	2025 Czechia
Bronze medal – third place	2019 Finland

Jocelyne Dawn Marie Larocque (born May 19, 1988) is a Canadian professional ice hockey player for the Ottawa Charge of the Professional Women's Hockey League (PWHL). She previously played in the PWHPA, with the Toronto Sceptres of the PWHL, Calgary Inferno and Markham Thunder of the Canadian Women's Hockey League (CWHL), the Calgary Oval X-Treme and Manitoba Maple Leafs of the Western Women's Hockey League (WWHL), and the Minnesota Duluth Bulldogs of the Western Collegiate Hockey Association (WCHA). With the Bulldogs, she was a two-time NCAA Women's Ice Hockey Tournament champion (2008, 2010). Larocque is of Métis heritage and was the first Indigenous athlete to participate in the women's ice hockey tournament at the Winter Olympics.

== Early life ==
Larocque played hockey and basketball from 2002 to 2004 at College Lorette Collegiate in Manitoba. During the 2003–04 season, she became the first female player to appear in the Winnipeg High School Boys League. Larocque attended the Hockey Manitoba Program of Excellence Camp from June 25 to 27, 2004. Larocque competed for Manitoba at the 2003 Esso Women's Nationals in Saskatoon as the Manitoba team finished eighth. In January 2005, she was a member of the Manitoba team that participated in the Canadian National Women's Under-18 Championship in Salmon Arm, BC. Manitoba finished fifth, but Larocque was honoured as Top Defenceman. She won the WWHL championship with the Calgary Oval X-Treme in 2005.

== College career ==
In March 2008, Larocque had one assist as UMD won their fourth NCAA national championship in a 4–0 win over the University of Wisconsin. She competed along with two other players from her hometown of Ste. Anne, Manitoba (population 1,500), Minnesota Golden Gophers senior captain Melanie Gagnon and Mercyhurst forward Bailey Bram. The three were known colloquially as the “Ste. Anne Three.” Also in 2009, Larocque was the first Bulldog defenceman to be named to the All-American first team.

After being cut from Team Canada's Olympic roster in December 2009, Larocque elected to return to UMD for the second half of the 2009–10 season, forfeiting half a season of NCAA eligibility. On March 22, 2010, Larocque and the Bulldogs earned their fifth NCAA national championship with a 3–2 triple overtime victory over Cornell University.

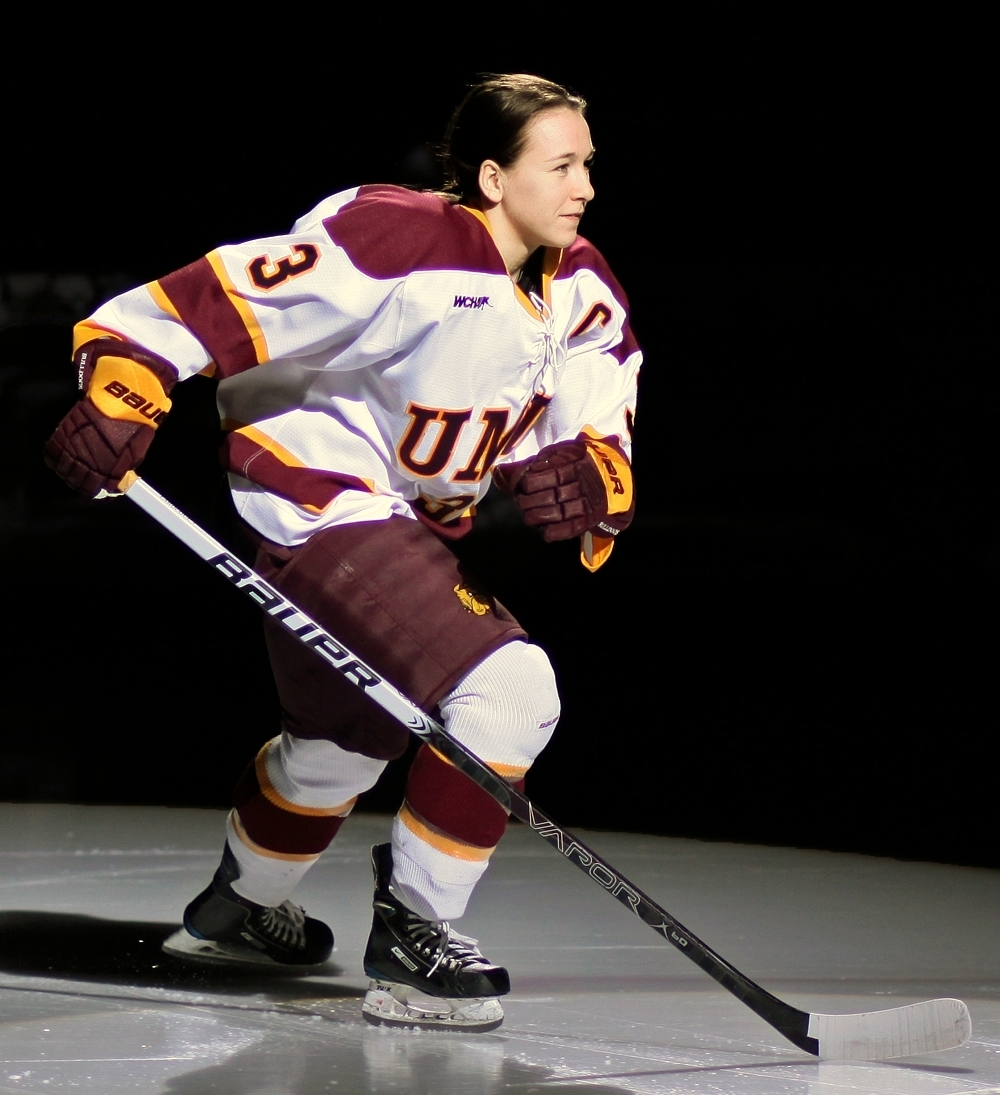
Larocque with UMD in 2011

In a February 12, 2011 game against the Ohio State Buckeyes, Larocque had a goal and three assists as the Bulldogs defeated Ohio State by a 5–1 mark. Already the all-time top-scoring defenceman in UMD history, she became UMD's 14th player and first defenceman to score 100 career points. Larocque's assist on a power play goal with 40 seconds remaining was her second career four-point game. Larocque was the top-scoring defenceman in the WCHA for the 2010–11 season, with six goals and 18 assists for 24 points in 26 league contests.

In post-season league honours, Larocque was named to the All-WCHA first team; was voted the WCHA Defensive Player of the Year in a vote of the league's head coaches; was the top-scoring defenceman in the league with six goals, 18 assists and 24 points in 26 league contests; was named the WCHA Outstanding Student Athlete of the Year; and was named to the 2010–11 All-WCHA Academic Team.

She graduated with honours from the University of Minnesota Duluth in 2011 with a Bachelor of Accountancy. She ended her college hockey career as the Bulldogs' all-time leader in scoring for defencemen with 105 points on 19 goals and 86 assists in 127 games.

== Professional career ==
Larocque first played for the Team Alberta franchise and remained with them after a rebranding that saw them renamed the Calgary Inferno. In August 2013, she was traded to the Brampton Thunder for fellow Manitoban Bailey Bram. Of note, she served as the final team captain in the history of the Brampton Thunder. When the franchise relocated to Markham, Ontario, she continued as team captain. Of note, she served in the capacity when the Thunder captured the 2018 Clarkson Cup, a franchise first.

On September 18, 2023, Larocque was drafted second overall by PWHL Toronto in the 2023 PWHL Draft. Of note, Larocque participated in the first ever PWHL game, taking place on January 1, 2024 at Toronto's Mattamy Athletic Centre.

On December 30, 2024, Toronto traded Larocque to the Ottawa Charge, alongside Victoria Bach (also a former teammate from the Markham Thunder), in exchange for Savannah Harmon and Hayley Scamurra. Of note, it marked the first trade of the 2024–25 PWHL season.

== International play ==
She participated in the Canadian National Team Fall Festival from August 31 to September 9, 2007. She was an Air Canada Cup women's champion in 2005–06 and 2006–07. On November 27, 2009, Larocque and Brianne Jenner were released from Hockey Canada's centralized roster to determine the roster for the Vancouver 2010 Winter Games.

Despite not qualifying for the roster competing at the 2010 Winter Olympics in Vancouver, she was named to the final roster for the 2010 MLP Nations Cup. Larocque had an assist in the semi-final of the 2010 MLP Cup. In addition, she attended the Hockey Canada Strength and Conditioning Camp in Calgary from May 25 to 30, 2010. In addition, Larocque competed with Canada at the 2010 Four Nations Cup and won a gold medal.

Her Olympic debut with the national team came at the 2014 Sochi Olympics, where Team Canada won the gold medal. She played in the 2018 Winter Olympics in Pyeongchang, South Korea, winning a silver medal with Team Canada. She received attention following the gold medal game for removing her silver medal immediately after it was presented to her, prompting a later reproach from an IIHF official. She issued an apology the following day, saying in part, "In the moment, I was disappointed with the outcome of the game, and my emotions got the better of me. I meant no disrespect. It has been an honour to represent my country and win a medal for Canada. I'm proud of our team and proud to be counted among the Canadian athletes who have won medals at these games."

On January 11, 2022, Larocque was named to Canada's 2022 Olympic team, where she won the gold medal.

On January 9, 2026, she was named to Canada's roster to compete at the 2026 Winter Olympics, where she won a silver medal. Her four Olympic medals (2 gold and 2 silver) make her the most-decorated Indigenous athlete from North America.

== Personal life ==
Former Gophers player and captain Melanie Gagnon is Larocque's cousin. A team was named after her at the 2007 Female Atom Hockey Festival presented by the Manitoba Moose on December 29, at the MTS Centre in Winnipeg.

Larocque's sister, Chantal, has competed for Canada at the ISBHF World Championships. Both were also teammates on the now-defunct Calgary Oval X-Treme.

== Career statistics ==
Career statistics are from USCHO.com, or Eliteprospects.com, or The Internet Hockey Database, or NCAA or the Team Canada Media Guide for 2022.

=== Regular season and playoffs ===
			Regular season					Playoffs
Season	Team	League	GP	G	A	Pts	PIM	GP	G	A	Pts	PIM
2004–05	Calgary Oval X-Treme	WWHL	17	2	6	8	18	3	0	0	0	2
2005–06	Calgary Oval X-Treme	WWHL	21	2	8	10	66	3	0	4	4	8
2006–07	Calgary Oval X-Treme	WWHL	21	3	15	18	43	3	0	0	0	6
2007–08	Univ. of Minnesota Duluth	WCHA	39	4	22	26	60	3	0	1	1	6
2008–09	Univ. of Minnesota Duluth	WCHA	37	4	33	37	108	2	0	1	1	4
2009–10	Univ. of Minnesota Duluth	WCHA	19	3	10	13	50	3	1	1	2	4
2010–11	Univ. of Minnesota Duluth	WCHA	32	8	21	29	60	1	0	0	0	0
2011–12	Manitoba Maple Leafs	WWHL	32	14	35	49	22	—	—	—	—	—
2012–13	Alberta Honeybadgers	CWHL	23	1	2	3	44	—	—	—	—	—
2013–14	Canada	AMHL	17	0	0	0	16	—	—	—	—	—
2014–15	Brampton Thunder	CWHL	24	3	2	5	38	—	—	—	—	—
2015–16	Brampton Thunder	CWHL	24	2	5	7	32	2	0	1	1	4
2016–17	Brampton Thunder	CWHL	20	0	4	4	38	—	—	—	—	—
2017–18	Canada	AMHL	11	0	3	3	6	—	—	—	—	—
2017–18	Markham Thunder	CWHL	4	1	1	2	2	3	0	0	0	2
2018–19	Markham Thunder	CWHL	23	2	8	10	28	3	0	2	2	4
2019–20	GTA East	PWHPA	—	—	—	—	—	—	—	—	—	—
2020–21	Toronto	PWHPA	4	0	3	3	2	—	—	—	—	—
2022–23	Team Adidas	PWHPA	20	0	2	2	20	—	—	—	—	—
2023–24	PWHL Toronto	PWHL	23	1	9	10	6	5	0	1	1	6
2024–25	Toronto Sceptres	PWHL	6	0	2	2	—	—	—	—	—	—
2024–25	Ottawa Charge	PWHL	24	0	5	5	12	8	1	3	4	2
2025–26	Ottawa Charge	PWHL	30	1	7	8	18	8	1	3	4	4
CWHL totals			118	9	22	31	182	8	0	3	3	10
PWHL totals			83	2	23	35	36	21	2	7	9	12

=== International ===
Year	Team	Event	Result	GP	G	A	Pts	PIM
2006	Canada U22	ACC	1st place, gold medalist(s)	4	1	0	1	6
2007	Canada U22	ACC	1st place, gold medalist(s)	5	0	0	0	2
2008	Canada U22	ACC	1st place, gold medalist(s)	4	0	3	3	8
2008	Canada	4 Nations Cup	2nd place, silver medalist(s)	3	1	0	1	6
2009	Canada U22	MLP	2nd place, silver medalist(s)	5	1	0	1	2
2009	Canada	4 Nations Cup	1st place, gold medalist(s)	2	0	0	0	0
2010	Canada U22	MLP	1st place, gold medalist(s)	5	0	2	2	8
2010	Canada	4 Nations Cup	1st place, gold medalist(s)	4	0	3	3	2
2011	Canada	WC	2nd place, silver medalist(s)	5	0	2	2	6
2011	Canada	4 Nations Cup	2nd place, silver medalist(s)	4	0	1	1	4
2012	Canada	WC	1st place, gold medalist(s)	5	0	1	1	6
2013	Canada	WC	2nd place, silver medalist(s)	5	0	2	2	8
2013	Canada	4 Nations Cup	1st place, gold medalist(s)	4	0	0	0	4
2014	Canada	OG	1st place, gold medalist(s)	5	1	1	2	2
2014	Canada	4 Nations Cup	1st place, gold medalist(s)	4	0	0	0	6
2015	Canada	WC	2nd place, silver medalist(s)	5	0	0	0	4
2016	Canada	WC	2nd place, silver medalist(s)	4	0	0	0	4
2016	Canada	4 Nations Cup	2nd place, silver medalist(s)	3	0	0	0	0
2017	Canada	WC	2nd place, silver medalist(s)	5	0	2	2	4
2017	Canada	4 Nations Cup	2nd place, silver medalist(s)	3	0	0	0	8
2018	Canada	OG	2nd place, silver medalist(s)	5	0	1	1	2
2018	Canada	4 Nations Cup	2nd place, silver medalist(s)	4	0	0	0	6
2019	Canada	WC	3rd place, bronze medalist(s)	7	0	3	3	2
2021	Canada	WC	1st place, gold medalist(s)	7	0	4	4	8
2022	Canada	OG	1st place, gold medalist(s)	7	0	2	2	10
2022	Canada	WC	1st place, gold medalist(s)	7	1	5	6	2
2024	Canada	WC	1st place, gold medalist(s)	7	1	4	5	12
2025	Canada	WC	2nd place, silver medalist(s)	7	0	3	3	0
2026	Canada	OG	2nd place, silver medalist(s)	7	0	0	0	2
U22 totals				23	2	5	7	26
Senior totals				119	4	34	38	108

== Awards and honours ==
=== NCAA ===
- 2009 First Team All-America selection
- WCHA Defensive Player of the Week (Week of February 16, 2011)
- 2011 Patty Kazmaier Award Nominee
- 2011 WCHA Outstanding Student-Athlete of the Year
- 2011 WCHA Defensive Player of the Year
- 2011 All-WCHA First Team
- 2011 First Team All-America selection

=== International ===
- 2014 Sochi Olympic Women's Hockey Gold Medal
- 2018 Pyeongchang Olympics Women's Silver Medal
- 2022 Beijing Olympics Women's Gold Medal

=== CWHL ===
- 2018 Clarkson Cup champion

=== Other ===
- 2018 winner of the Tom Longboat Award
- Manitoba Indigenous Female Athlete of the Decade (awarded January 2021)
- In 2026, she was appointed to the Order of Manitoba, the province’s highest honour.
