= Jesse Scanzano =

Canadian ice hockey player (born 1988)

Jesse Scanzano - Vujasic
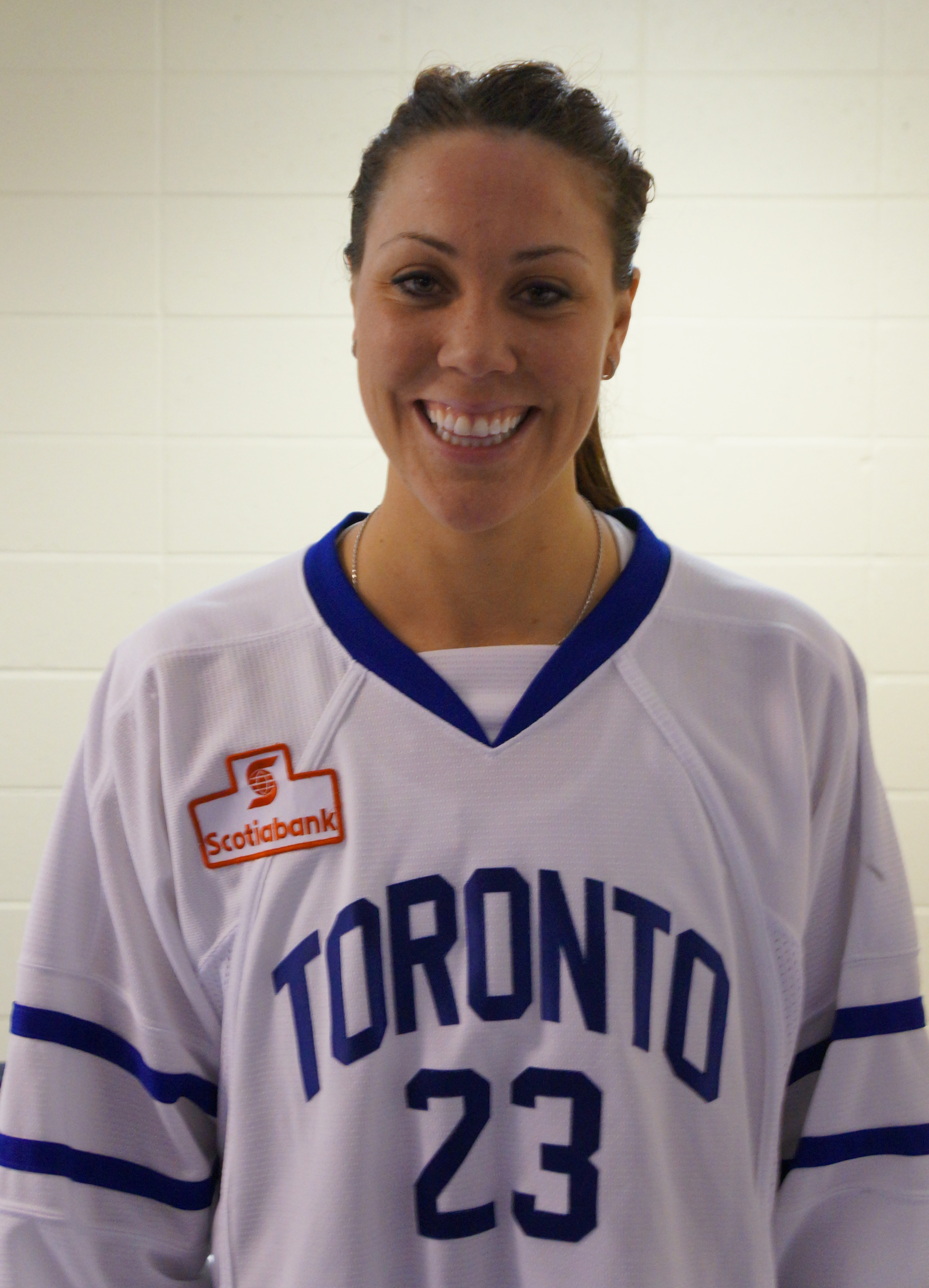
- Scanzano with the Toronto Furies in 2012
- Born: October 15, 1988 (age 38) Montreal, Quebec, Canada
- Height: 6 ft 0 in (183 cm)
- Weight: 170 lb (77 kg; 12 st 2 lb)
- Position: Forward
- Shot: Right
- Played for: Brampton Thunder; Montreal Stars; Toronto Furies; Mercyhurst Lakers; Montreal Axion
- National team: Canada
- Playing career: 2005–2016

Jesse Scanzano (born October 15, 1988) is a Canadian retired ice hockey forward. She was selected fifth overall in the 2011 CWHL Draft. Mercyhurst's Jesse Scanzano was a three-time All-College Hockey America selection (2008–09, 2009–10, 2010–11) and a member of the CHA All-Rookie Team in 2007–08. She ranks No. 2 in career points (225) in CHA history. In her Junior year with Mercyhurst, Scanzano led the NCAA in points with 65. Scanzano played for the 2011–12 Canada women's national ice hockey team and appeared in the 2011 4 Nations Cup.

== Playing career ==
Scanzano grew up in Montreal, Quebec and played for the Montreal Axion women's ice hockey team and participated in the Esso Women's Nationals in 2005 and 2006, winning bronze and silver medals respectively.

=== Montreal Axion ===
- Scanzano joined the Montreal Axion of the Canadian National Women's Hockey League (NWHL; operated 1999 to 2007 ) as a 15-year-old. Prior to playing for the Axion, she played bantam boys' hockey in the Lac St. Louis Hockey Association with the West Island Royals. She won the NWHL championship with the Axion in 2005–06. The following season, she was the leading scorer for the Axion as she had 46 points (24 goals, 22 assists) in 35 games.
- On February 11, 2007, Scanzano was involved in a controversial game for the franchise. In a game against the Brampton Thunder, Scanzano scored two goals but the game ended in controversy due to the result of the shootout. A player for the Axion left the penalty box prior to the shootout commencing and took the first shot for the Axion. This was a violation of NWHL rules.

=== Mercyhurst College ===
- In her rookie season with the Mercyhurst Lakers women's ice hockey program, Scanzano appeared in 37 games with 13 goals and 29 assists. Scanzano was the third Quebecer in the history of the Lakers women's hockey program. She was second on the team in assists and third in points. She had nine multiple-point games and ended the season with a seven-game scoring streak. Nationally, she was fifth in points per game by a rookie (1.08), and fourteenth in assists per game (0.73). For her efforts, she was named to the CHA All-Rookie Team and was a six-time CHA Rookie of the Week.
- As a sophomore, Scanzano led the team with a .191 shooting percentage while ranking second on team in goals, assists, points, and power-play goals (11). For her efforts, she was named to the All-CHA Second Team. Scanzano's numbers were the fifth-best single-season offensive numbers in program history. She averaged 2.25 points per game during 16 conference games and was second in conference scoring behind teammate Meghan Agosta. Overall, she ranked sixth in the nation in points scored, and eighth in NCAA Division I in goals and assists Scanzano earned CHA Tournament MVP honors as a sophomore in 2008–09 with seven points on two goals and five assists as Mercyhurst outscored Niagara and Wayne State, 14–3, en route to the league's postseason crown. In the NCAA tournament that season she recorded three assists in the Lakers' semifinal win over Minnesota.
- As a junior, Scanzano was named to the 2009–10 Preseason All-CHA team and was also tabbed as the 2009–10 Preseason CHA Player of the Year. She was a Patty Kazmaier Award Top-10 finalist and earned AHCA All-America honours as the Lakers captured the CHA regular season and postseason titles and reached Frozen Four for the second consecutive season. During the 2009–10 season, Jesse Scanzano led the NCAA in most shorthanded goals with 4. In addition, she led the NCAA in points per game, with an average of 1.97. She registered a team-high 65 points on 20 goals and 45 assists. She dished out three assists in the 2010 NCAA quarterfinals to help Mercyhurst down Boston University, 5–1, to advance to the Frozen Four.
- In her final season with the Lakers, Scanzano netted three hat tricks including back-to-back three-goal games against St. Lawrence and St. Cloud State in December and January and recorded her 200th career point in a two-goal, two-assist performance against Brown on Jan. 14. 2011.

=== CWHL ===
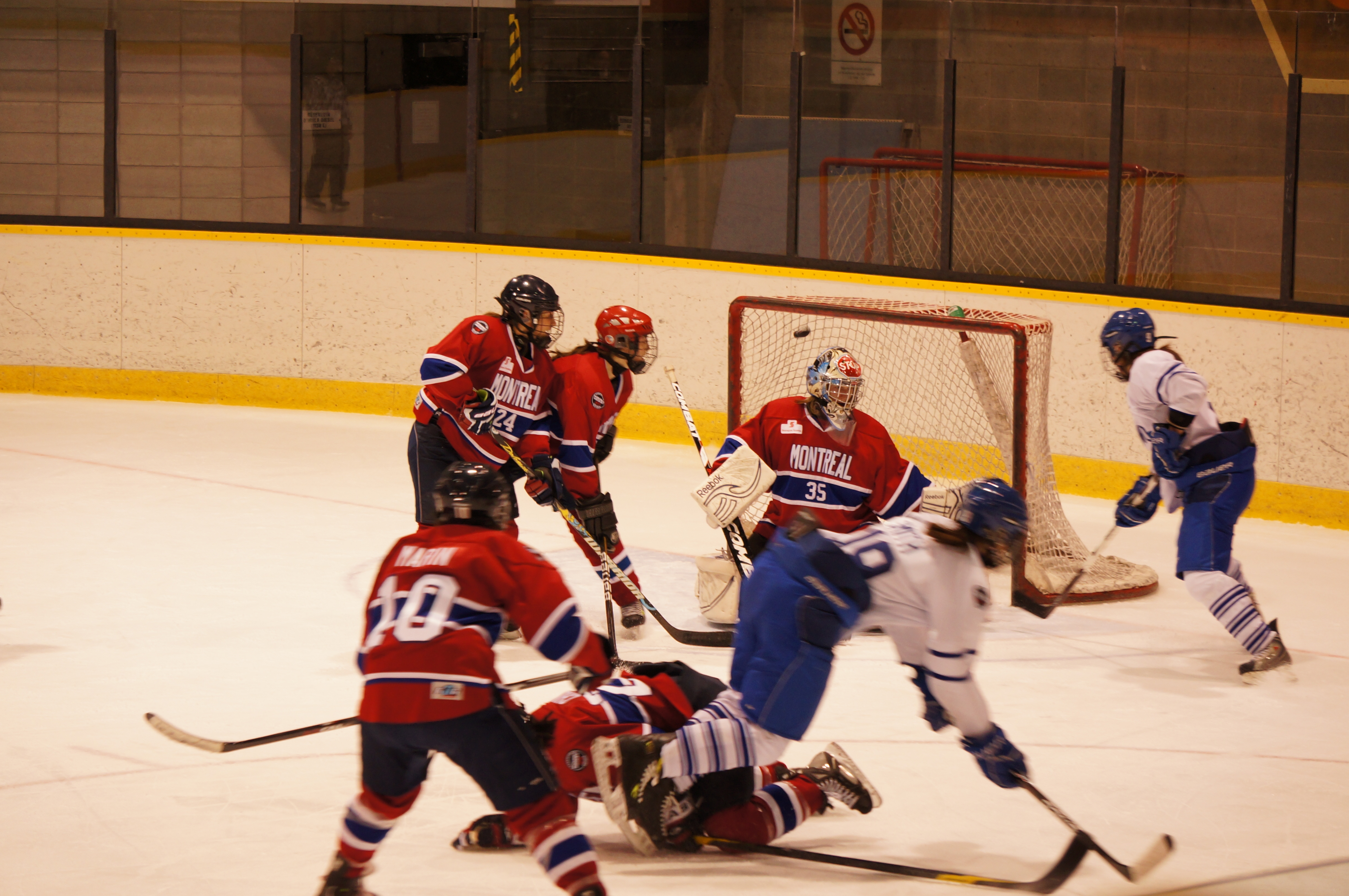
Scanzano scores against the Montreal Stars in January 2011

Scanzano was the fifth overall selection in the 2011 CWHL Draft. For 2011–12 season, she played with the Toronto Furies of the Canadian Women's Hockey League (CWHL). On November 2, 2011, Scanzano was on loan from the Toronto Furies, as she appeared in one game for the Brampton Thunder. The game was an exhibition contest versus her alma mater, the Mercyhurst Lakers. In the second period of said contest, Scanzano scored the game-winning goal as the Thunder defeated the Lakers by a 3-1 tally.

=== Team Canada ===
Medal record

Women's ice hockey

Representing Canada

MLP Cup
Gold medal – first place	2010 Germany	

- In 2005, Scanzano participated for Team Quebec at the Canadian Under-18 Hockey Challenge. Some of her teammates included future Olympic gold medalist Catherine Ward, future McGill Martlet Ann-Sophie Bettez, and future NCAA players Emmanuelle Blais and Karel Emard.
- In 2007, she participated in the Air Canada Cup for Canada's Under-22 Team. In the first game of the tournament, against Japan, Scanzano had three assists.
- She represented Team Canada's Under-22 team at the 2008 Air Canada Cup in Ravensburg, Germany.
- Scanzano was one of six Mercyhurst players (along with Vicki Bendus, Bailey Bram, Jess Jones, Hillary Pattenden, and Laura Hosier) invited to try out for the Under-22 Team in August 2009. Scanzano was named to the final roster of the 2009–10 National Women's Under-22 Team.
- Scanzano won a gold medal with the Canadian National Women's Under-22 Team at the 2010 MLP Cup. In the gold medal game, Scanzano had a goal and an assist.
- In March 2011, she was invited to the Canadian women's national ice hockey team selection camp to determine the final roster for the 2011 IIHF Women's World Championships.
- She travelled to Bratislava, Slovakia to participate in the 2011 IIHF High Performance Women's Camp from July 4–12.
- Scanzano was named to the Canadian roster that competed in the 2011 IIHF Eight Nations Tournament. In the first game of the 2011 IIHF Eight Nations Tournament, Scanzano scored two goals in a 16–0 victory over Switzerland. In the third game of the tournament, she scored two goals in an 11–0 shootout over Slovakia.
- Scanzano competed in the 2011 4 Nations Cup and scored a goal versus Finland on November 9, 2011.

== Career stats ==
Year	Team	Games Played	Goals	Assists	Points	Shots	+/-	PIM
2005	Quebec Under 18 Team	5	1	3	4	N/A	0	10
2005	Esso Women's National (Team Quebec)	6	3	3	6	N/A	0	2
2007	Europe Air Canada Cup	3	0	0	0	N/A	0	2

=== NCAA D1 ===
Year	Team	Games Played	Goals	Assists	Points	+/-	PIM
2007–08	Mercyhurst	37	13	27	40	+17	66
2008–09	Mercyhurst	37	27	35	62	+37	72
2009-2010	Mercyhurst	33	20	45	65		72
2010-2011	Mercyhurst	34	25	33	58		60

=== CWHL ===
Year	Team	Games Played	Goals	Assists	Points	+/-	PIM	PPG	SHG	GWG
2012-13	Montreal Stars	2	0	0	0	0	0	0	0	0
2014-15	Brampton Thunder	20	4	5	9	-16	40	0	0	1

== Personal ==
Scanzano majored in business at Mercyhurst University.

Her brothers, Shawn and Wes, are twins and both played in the American Hockey League (AHL) and East Coast Hockey League (ECHL). Her nephew, Cruz, is currently a defenseman for the Saint John Sea Dogs of the QMJHL.

== Awards and honours ==
- In 2010, led the NCAA in most shorthanded goals
- In 2010, led the NCAA in points, with an average of 1.97 points per game.
- 2010 nominee for the Patty Kazmaier Memorial Award
- 2010 First Team All-CHA
- 2009-10 Preseason All-CHA team
- 2009-10 Preseason CHA Player of the Year
- In 2009, finished 6th in points in the Nation
- 2009 CHA Tournament MVP
- 2009 All-CHA Second Team
- 2008 CHA All-Rookie Team
- Six-time CHA Rookie of the Week (2007–08)
- 2007 European Air Canada Cup champions
- Bronze medal at the Esso Nationals in Sarnia, Ontario (2005)
- 2010 Women's RBK Hockey Division I All-America Second Team
- 2011 Patty Kazmaier Award Nominee
- CHA Player of the Month (Month of February 2011)
- 2010-11 Second Team All-CHA selection
- 2006 she was the leading scorer for the Axion as she had 46 points (24 goals, 22 assists) in 35 games
