= List of Finland women's national ice hockey team rosters =

The following is a list of the rosters for the Finland women's national ice hockey team in various international competitions.

== Winter Olympics ==
The Finnish national team has participated in every Olympic women's ice hockey tournament since the tournament was added to the Winter Olympics program in 1998.

=== 2022 Winter Olympics ===
The roster was announced on 20 January 2022.

Head coach: Pasi Mustonen

No.	Pos.	Name	Height	Weight	Birthdate	Team
1	G	Eveliina Mäkinen	1.75 m (5 ft 9 in)	68 kg (150 lb)	12 April 1995 (aged 26)	(Sweden) Brynäs IF
2	D	Sini Karjalainen	1.74 m (5 ft 9 in)	68 kg (150 lb)	30 January 1999 (aged 23)	(United States) Vermont Catamounts
6	D	Jenni Hiirikoski	1.62 m (5 ft 4 in)	62 kg (137 lb)	30 March 1987 (aged 34)	(Sweden) Luleå HF
7	D	Sanni Rantala	1.73 m (5 ft 8 in)	63 kg (139 lb)	8 July 2002 (aged 19)	(Finland) Kiekko-Espoo
8	D	Ella Viitasuo	1.72 m (5 ft 8 in)	69 kg (152 lb)	27 May 1996 (aged 25)	(Finland) Kiekko-Espoo
9	D	Nelli Laitinen	1.69 m (5 ft 7 in)	62 kg (137 lb)	29 April 2002 (aged 19)	(Finland) Kiekko-Espoo
10	F	Elisa Holopainen	1.66 m (5 ft 5 in)	58 kg (128 lb)	27 December 2001 (aged 20)	(Finland) Kiekko-Espoo
12	F	Sanni Vanhanen	1.65 m (5 ft 5 in)	57 kg (126 lb)	1 July 2005 (aged 16)	(Finland) Tappara U16
15	D	Minttu Tuominen	1.65 m (5 ft 5 in)	73 kg (161 lb)	26 June 1990 (aged 31)	(Finland) Kiekko-Espoo
16	F	Petra Nieminen	1.69 m (5 ft 7 in)	68 kg (150 lb)	4 May 1999 (aged 22)	(Sweden) Luleå HF
18	G	Meeri Räisänen	1.70 m (5 ft 7 in)	66 kg (146 lb)	2 December 1989 (aged 32)	(Finland) JYP U20 Akatemia
23	F	Sanni Hakala	1.54 m (5 ft 1 in)	54 kg (119 lb)	31 October 1997 (aged 24)	(Sweden) HV71
24	F	Viivi Vainikka	1.66 m (5 ft 5 in)	67 kg (148 lb)	23 December 2001 (aged 20)	(Sweden) Luleå HF
27	F	Julia Liikala	1.66 m (5 ft 5 in)	63 kg (139 lb)	20 March 2001 (aged 20)	(Finland) HIFK
28	F	Jenniina Nylund	1.71 m (5 ft 7 in)	64 kg (141 lb)	18 June 1999 (aged 22)	(United States) St. Cloud State Huskies
32	F	Emilia Vesa	1.77 m (5 ft 10 in)	66 kg (146 lb)	3 January 2001 (aged 21)	(Finland) Kiekko-Espoo
33	F	Michelle Karvinen	1.67 m (5 ft 6 in)	65 kg (143 lb)	27 March 1990 (aged 31)	(Sweden) Malmö Redhawks
34	F	Sofianna Sundelin	1.69 m (5 ft 7 in)	55 kg (121 lb)	13 January 2003 (aged 19)	(Finland) Team Kuortane
36	G	Anni Keisala	1.75 m (5 ft 9 in)	80 kg (180 lb)	5 April 1997 (aged 24)	(Finland) Ilves
40	F	Noora Tulus	1.65 m (5 ft 5 in)	56 kg (123 lb)	15 August 1995 (aged 26)	(Sweden) Luleå HF
61	F	Tanja Niskanen	1.76 m (5 ft 9 in)	72 kg (159 lb)	11 September 1992 (aged 29)	(Finland) KalPa
77	F	Susanna Tapani	1.77 m (5 ft 10 in)	68 kg (150 lb)	2 March 1993 (aged 28)	(China) KRS Vanke Rays
88	D	Ronja Savolainen	1.77 m (5 ft 10 in)	75 kg (165 lb)	29 November 1997 (aged 24)	(Sweden) Luleå HF

=== 2018 Winter Olympics ===
The Finnish roster for the women's ice hockey tournament at the 2018 Winter Olympics was published on 22 January 2018.

Head coach: (Finland) Pasi Mustonen Assistant coaches: (Finland) Juuso Toivola

No.	Pos.	Name	Height	Weight	Birthdate	Birthplace	2017–18 team
1	G	Eveliina Suonpää	1.74 m (5 ft 9 in)	64 kg (141 lb)	12 April 1995	Kiukainen	(Finland) Lukko (Liiga)
2	D	Isa Rahunen	1.65 m (5 ft 5 in)	66 kg (146 lb)	16 April 1993	Kuopio	(Finland) Kärpät (Liiga)
4	D	Rosa Lindstedt	1.86 m (6 ft 1 in)	80 kg (180 lb)	24 January 1988	Ylöjärvi	(Sweden) HV71 (SDHL)
6	D	Jenni Hiirikoski – C	1.61 m (5 ft 3 in)	62 kg (137 lb)	30 March 1987	Lempäälä	(Sweden) Luleå HF (SDHL)
7	D	Mira Jalosuo	1.84 m (6 ft 0 in)	80 kg (180 lb)	3 February 1989	Lieksa	(Finland) Kärpät (Liiga)
8	D	Ella Viitasuo	1.72 m (5 ft 8 in)	66 kg (146 lb)	27 May 1996	Lahti	(Finland) Espoo Blues (Liiga)
9	F	Venla Hovi	1.69 m (5 ft 7 in)	67 kg (148 lb)	28 October 1987	Tampere	(Canada) Univ. of Manitoba (U SPORTS)
10	F	Linda Välimäki	1.66 m (5 ft 5 in)	72 kg (159 lb)	31 May 1990	Ylöjärvi	(Finland) Ilves (Liiga)
11	F	Annina Rajahuhta	1.64 m (5 ft 5 in)	69 kg (152 lb)	8 March 1989	Helsinki	(China) Kunlun Red Star (CWHL)
13	F	Riikka Välilä – A	1.63 m (5 ft 4 in)	60 kg (130 lb)	12 June 1973	Jyväskylä	(Sweden) HV71 (SDHL)
15	D	Minnamari Tuominen	1.65 m (5 ft 5 in)	71 kg (157 lb)	26 June 1990	Helsinki	(Finland) Espoo Blues (Liiga)
18	G	Meeri Räisänen	1.70 m (5 ft 7 in)	62 kg (137 lb)	2 December 1989	Tampere	(Finland) HPK (Liiga)
19	F	Petra Nieminen	1.69 m (5 ft 7 in)	64 kg (141 lb)	4 May 1999	Tampere	(Finland) Team Kuortane (Liiga)
22	F	Emma Nuutinen	1.76 m (5 ft 9 in)	73 kg (161 lb)	7 December 1996	Vantaa	(United States) Mercyhurst University (NCAA)
23	F	Sanni Hakala	1.53 m (5 ft 0 in)	56 kg (123 lb)	31 October 1997	Jyväskylä	(Sweden) HV71 (SDHL)
24	F	Noora Tulus	1.65 m (5 ft 5 in)	67 kg (148 lb)	15 August 1995	Vantaa	(Sweden) Luleå HF (SDHL)
26	F	Sara Säkkinen	1.62 m (5 ft 4 in)	61 kg (134 lb)	7 April 1998	Tampere	(Finland) Team Kuortane (Liiga)
27	F	Saila Saari	1.70 m (5 ft 7 in)	62 kg (137 lb)	1 November 1989	Alavus	(Finland) Kärpät (Liiga)
33	F	Michelle Karvinen – A	1.67 m (5 ft 6 in)	70 kg (150 lb)	27 March 1990	Rødovre, Denmark	(Sweden) Luleå HF (SDHL)
41	G	Noora Räty	1.64 m (5 ft 5 in)	65 kg (143 lb)	29 May 1989	Espoo	(China) Kunlun Red Star (CWHL)
61	F	Tanja Niskanen	1.76 m (5 ft 9 in)	69 kg (152 lb)	9 November 1992	Juankoski	(Finland) KalPa (Liiga)
77	F	Susanna Tapani	1.75 m (5 ft 9 in)	60 kg (130 lb)	2 March 1993	Laitila	(Finland) Lukko (Liiga)
88	D	Ronja Savolainen	1.76 m (5 ft 9 in)	70 kg (150 lb)	29 November 1997	Helsinki	(Sweden) Luleå HF (SDHL)

=== 2014 Winter Olympics ===
Roster for the women's ice hockey tournament at the 2014 Winter Olympics in Sochi.

The Finnish roster for the women's ice hockey tournament of the 2014 Winter Olympics was published on 18 December 2013. The players were picked by the head coach Mika Pieniniemi.

No.	Pos.	Name	Height	Weight	Birthdate	Birthplace	2013–14 team
1	G	Eveliina Suonpää	173 cm (5 ft 8 in)	63 kg (139 lb)	12 April 1995	Kiukainen	(Finland) Team Oriflame Kuortane (SM-sarja)
3	D	Emma Terho	159 cm (5 ft 3 in)	60 kg (130 lb)	17 December 1981	Washington, D.C., USA	(Finland) Espoo Blues (SM-sarja)
4	D	Rosa Lindstedt	186 cm (6 ft 1 in)	80 kg (180 lb)	24 January 1988	Ylöjärvi	(Finland) JYP Jyväskylä (SM-sarja)
5	D	Anna Kilponen	169 cm (5 ft 7 in)	74 kg (163 lb)	16 May 1995	Orivesi	(Finland) Team Oriflame Kuortane (SM-sarja)
6	D	Jenni Hiirikoski – C	162 cm (5 ft 4 in)	60 kg (130 lb)	30 March 1987	Lempäälä	(Finland) JYP Jyväskylä (SM-sarja)
7	D	Mira Jalosuo	184 cm (6 ft 0 in)	80 kg (180 lb)	3 February 1989	Lieksa	(Russia) SKIF Nizhny Novgorod (RWHL)
9	F	Venla Hovi	169 cm (5 ft 7 in)	63 kg (139 lb)	28 October 1987	Tampere	(Finland) KalPa Kuopio (SM-sarja)
10	F	Linda Välimäki	166 cm (5 ft 5 in)	70 kg (150 lb)	31 May 1990	Ylöjärvi	(Finland) Espoo Blues (SM-sarja)
11	F	Anniina Rajahuhta	164 cm (5 ft 5 in)	70 kg (150 lb)	8 March 1989	Helsinki	(Finland) Espoo Blues (SM-sarja)
13	F	Riikka Välilä	160 cm (5 ft 3 in)	63 kg (139 lb)	12 June 1973	Jyväskylä	(Finland) JYP Jyväskylä (SM-sarja)
15	F	Minttu Tuominen	165 cm (5 ft 5 in)	70 kg (150 lb)	26 June 1990	Helsinki	(Finland) Espoo Blues (SM-sarja)
16	F	Vilma Tanskanen	175 cm (5 ft 9 in)	66 kg (146 lb)	14 April 1995	Helsinki	(Finland) Team Oriflame Kuortane (SM-sarja)
18	G	Meeri Räisänen	170 cm (5 ft 7 in)	62 kg (137 lb)	2 December 1989	Tampere	(Finland) JYP Jyväskylä (SM-sarja)
20	D	Saija Tarkki	172 cm (5 ft 8 in)	60 kg (130 lb)	29 December 1982	Oulu	(Finland) Oulun Kärpät (SM-sarja)
21	F	Michelle Karvinen	166 cm (5 ft 5 in)	69 kg (152 lb)	27 March 1990	Rødovre, Denmark	(United States) University of North Dakota (NCAA)
23	F	Nina Tikkinen	170 cm (5 ft 7 in)	66 kg (146 lb)	6 February 1987	Salo	(Finland) Oulun Kärpät (SM-sarja)
29	F	Karoliina Rantamäki	163 cm (5 ft 4 in)	65 kg (143 lb)	23 February 1978	Vantaa	(Russia) SKIF Nizhny Novgorod (RWHL)
41	G	Noora Räty	165 cm (5 ft 5 in)	70 kg (150 lb)	29 May 1989	Espoo	(Finland) Ilves Tampere (SM-sarja)
77	F	Susanna Tapani	177 cm (5 ft 10 in)	64 kg (141 lb)	2 March 1993	Laitila	(United States) University of North Dakota (NCAA)
80	D	Tea Villilä	168 cm (5 ft 6 in)	63 kg (139 lb)	16 April 1991	Hyvinkää	(United States) Minnesota Duluth Bulldogs (NCAA)
96	F	Emma Nuutinen	176 cm (5 ft 9 in)	73 kg (161 lb)	7 December 1996	Helsinki	(Finland) Espoo Blues (SM-sarja)

=== 2010 Winter Olympics ===
Roster for the women's ice hockey tournament at the 2010 Winter Olympics in Vancouver.

The following is the Finnish roster in the women's ice hockey tournament of the 2010 Winter Olympics.

Position	Name	Height	Weight	Birthdate	Birthplace	2009–10 team
G	Mira Kuisma	168	65	6 May 1987	Kuopio	Oulun Kärpät
G	Noora Räty	164	68	29 May 1989	Espoo	Minnesota Golden Gophers
G	Anna Vanhatalo	178	65	29 February 1984	Helsinki	Espoo Blues
D	Jenni Hiirikoski – A	161	60	30 March 1987	Lempäälä	Ilves Tampere
D	Emma Laaksonen – C	159	59	17 December 1981	Washington, D.C., United States	Espoo Blues
D	Rosa Lindstedt	186	78	24 January 1988	Ylöjärvi	Ilves Tampere
D	Terhi Mertanen	166	68	4 April 1981	Joensuu	Espoo Blues
D	Heidi Pelttari	166	69	2 August 1985	Tampere	Ilves Tampere
D	Mariia Posa	164	58	21 February 1988	Hyvinkää	Minnesota Duluth Bulldogs
D	Saija Sirviö	172	62	29 December 1982	Oulu	Oulun Kärpät
F	Anne Helin	170	68	28 January 1987	Helsinki	Oulun Kärpät
F	Venla Hovi	169	62	28 October 1987	Tampere	Ilves Tampere
F	Michelle Karvinen	166	70	27 March 1990	Rødovre, Denmark	HC Rødovre
F	Annina Rajahuhta	164	62	8 March 1989	Helsinki	Ilves Tampere
F	Karoliina Rantamäki	163	65	23 February 1978	Espoo	SKIF Nizhny Novgorod
F	Mari Saarinen	172	67	30 July 1981	Kangasala	Ilves Tampere
F	Nina Tikkinen	170	67	6 February 1987	Salo	Minnesota State Mavericks
F	Minnamari Tuominen	165	67	26 June 1990	Helsinki	Ohio State Buckeyes
F	Saara Tuominen – A	169	65	1 January 1986	Ylöjärvi	Minnesota Duluth Bulldogs
F	Marjo Voutilainen	168	70	22 March 1981	Kuopio	Espoo Blues
F	Linda Välimäki	165	62	31 May 1990	Ylöjärvi	Ilves Tampere

=== 2006 Winter Olympics ===
Roster for the women's ice hockey tournament at the 2006 Winter Olympics in Turin.

No.	Position	Name	S/C	Height	Weight	Birthdate	Birthplace	2004–05 team
10	F	Sari Fisk – C	L	163	65	12/17/71	Pori	Espoo Blues
30	G	Maija Hassinen	L	161	52	01/02/84	Hämeenlinna	Ilves
15	F	Satu Hoikkala	R	165	63	01/14/80	Vantaa	Kärpät
5	D	Satu Kiipeli	L	174	72	12/24/80	Raahe	IHK
24	D	Kati Kovalainen – A	L	165	64	01/24/75	Leppävirta	IHK
2	D	Hanna Kuoppala	L	179	77	09/12/75	Jakobstad	Espoo Blues
3	D	Emma Laaksonen – A	L	159	60	12/17/81	Washington, D.C.	Espoo Blues
9	D	Terhi Mertanen	L	164	64	04/04/81	Joensuu	Kärpät
27	F	Marja-Helena Pälvilä	L	176	70	03/04/70	Oulu	Kärpät
11	F	Oona Parviainen	L	170	63	09/05/77	Kuopio	Espoo Blues
25	F	Mari Pehkonen	L	170	63	02/06/85	Tampere	University of Minnesota Duluth
4	D	Heidi Pelttari	L	165	68	08/02/85	Tampere	Ilves
29	F	Karoliina Rantamäki	L	163	68	02/23/78	Vantaa	Espoo Blues
1	G	Noora Räty	L	163	56	05/29/89	Espoo	Espoo Blues
12	F	Mari Saarinen	L	172	63	07/30/81	Kangasala	Ilves
21	F	Eveliina Similä	L	164	68	04/10/78	Toijala	Ilves
20	D	Saija Sirviö	L	171	57	12/29/82	Oulu	Kärpät
18	F	Nora Tallus	R	158	67	02/09/81	Kerava	IHK
22	F	Saara Tuominen	L	169	64	01/01/86	Ylöjärvi	Ilves
8	F	Satu Tuominen	L	163	61	11/19/85	Vantaa	Espoo Blues

=== 2002 Winter Olympics ===
Roster for the women's ice hockey tournament at the 2002 Winter Olympics in Provo and West Valley City, Utah.

Pirjo Ahonen, Sari Fisk, Kirsi Hänninen, Satu Hoikkala, Emma Laaksonen-Terho, Terhi Mertanen, Riikka Nieminen-Välilä, Marja-Helena Pälvilä, Oona Parviainen, Tuula Puputti, Karoliina Rantamäki, Tiia Reima, Katja Riipi, Päivi Salo, Henna Savikuja, Hanne Sikiö, Saija Sirviö-Tarkki, Petra Vaarakallio, Marjo Voutilainen

=== 1998 Winter Olympics ===
Roster for the women's ice hockey tournament at the 1998 Winter Olympics in Nagano.

Head coach: (Finland) Rauno Korpi
Assistant coach: (Finland) Jorma Kurjenmäki

No.	Pos.	Name	Height	Weight	Birthdate	Birthplace	1997–98 team
1	G	Liisa-Maria Sneck	1.67 m (5 ft 6 in)	80 kg (180 lb)	10 November 1968 (aged 29)	Helsinki	(Finland) Shakers Kerava
3	D	Emma Laaksonen	1.59 m (5 ft 3 in)	60 kg (130 lb)	17 December 1981 (aged 16)	Washington, D.C.	(Finland) Kiekko-Espoo
4	D	Katja Lehto	1.60 m (5 ft 3 in)	58 kg (128 lb)	14 August 1972 (aged 25)	Jyväskylä	(Finland) JYP Jyväskylä
5	D	Satu Huotari	1.62 m (5 ft 4 in)	63 kg (139 lb)	13 March 1967 (aged 30)	Oulu	(Finland) Kärpät Oulu
9	F	Marianne Ihalainen – C	1.65 m (5 ft 5 in)	68 kg (150 lb)	22 February 1967 (aged 30)	Tampere	(Finland) Ilves Tampere
10	F	Sari Fisk	1.64 m (5 ft 5 in)	65 kg (143 lb)	17 December 1971 (aged 26)	Pori	(Finland) Ilves Tampere
13	F	Riikka Nieminen – A	1.63 m (5 ft 4 in)	60 kg (130 lb)	12 June 1973 (aged 24)	Jyväskylä	(Finland) JYP Jyväskylä
14	F	Maria Selin	1.62 m (5 ft 4 in)	52 kg (115 lb)	8 September 1977 (aged 20)	Helsinki	(Finland) Kiekko-Espoo
15	D	Johanna Ikonen	1.62 m (5 ft 4 in)	63 kg (139 lb)	9 January 1969 (aged 29)	Eno	(Finland) Kiekko-Espoo
16	F	Tiia Reima	1.59 m (5 ft 3 in)	57 kg (126 lb)	1 February 1973 (aged 25)	Tampere	(Finland) Ilves Tampere
17	F	Sari Krooks	1.61 m (5 ft 3 in)	53 kg (117 lb)	2 February 1968 (aged 30)	Vaasa	(Finland) Ilves Tampere
19	G	Tuula Puputti	1.62 m (5 ft 4 in)	60 kg (130 lb)	5 November 1977 (aged 20)	Kuopio	(Finland) JYP Jyväskylä
20	D	Kirsi Hänninen – A	1.75 m (5 ft 9 in)	68 kg (150 lb)	3 October 1976 (aged 21)	Joensuu	(Finland) Kärpät Oulu
21	F	Petra Vaarakallio	1.76 m (5 ft 9 in)	73 kg (161 lb)	17 June 1975 (aged 22)	Helsinki	(Finland) Kiekko-Espoo
22	F	Sanna Lankosaari	1.62 m (5 ft 4 in)	63 kg (139 lb)	20 August 1978 (aged 19)	Kemi	(Finland) Kärpät Oulu
25	D	Marja-Helena Pälvilä	1.76 m (5 ft 9 in)	70 kg (150 lb)	4 March 1970 (aged 27)	Oulu	(Finland) Kärpät Oulu
26	F	Marika Lehtimäki	1.64 m (5 ft 5 in)	70 kg (150 lb)	7 February 1975 (aged 23)	Tampere	(Finland) Ilves Tampere
27	D	Päivi Salo	1.65 m (5 ft 5 in)	58 kg (128 lb)	31 January 1974 (aged 24)	Orimattila	(Finland) Kärpät Oulu
28	F	Katja Riipi	1.59 m (5 ft 3 in)	65 kg (143 lb)	26 October 1975 (aged 22)	Sodankylä	(Finland) Kärpät Oulu
29	F	Karoliina Rantamäki	1.63 m (5 ft 4 in)	65 kg (143 lb)	23 February 1978 (aged 19)	Vantaa	(Finland) Kiekko-Espoo

== World Championship ==
=== 2024 IIHF Women's World Championship ===
Roster for the 2024 IIHF Women's World Championship in Utica, New York, United States, as published by the International Ice Hockey Federation on 3 April 2024.

Head coach: Juuso Toivola
Assistant coaches: Saara Niemi, Mikko Palsola, Saija Sunnari, Tuomas Tarkki (goaltender)

Ages are as of 3 April 2024, the first day of the tournament.

No.	Pos.	Name	Height	Weight	Birthdate	Team
1	G	Sanni Ahola	1.71 m (5 ft 7 in)	81 kg (179 lb)	3 June 2000 (aged 23)	(United States) St. Cloud State Huskies
5	D	Siiri Yrjölä	1.66 m (5 ft 5 in)	68 kg (150 lb)	8 September 2004 (aged 19)	(Finland) HIFK Helsinki
6	D	Jenni Hiirikoski – C	1.62 m (5 ft 4 in)	62 kg (137 lb)	30 March 1987 (aged 37)	(Sweden) Luleå HF
7	D	Sanni Rantala	1.73 m (5 ft 8 in)	63 kg (139 lb)	8 July 2002 (aged 21)	(Finland) KalPa Kuopio
8	D	Eve Savander	1.68 m (5 ft 6 in)	68 kg (150 lb)	2 September 1998 (aged 25)	(Sweden) MoDo Hockey
9	D	Nelli Laitinen	1.69 m (5 ft 7 in)	62 kg (137 lb)	29 April 2002 (aged 21)	(United States) Minnesota Golden Gophers
10	F	Elisa Holopainen	1.66 m (5 ft 5 in)	58 kg (128 lb)	27 December 2001 (aged 22)	(Finland) KalPa Kuopio
12	F	Sanni Vanhanen	1.68 m (5 ft 6 in)	62 kg (137 lb)	1 July 2005 (aged 18)	(Finland) HIFK Helsinki
14	D	Krista Parkkonen	1.68 m (5 ft 6 in)	64 kg (141 lb)	25 June 2002 (aged 21)	(United States) Vermont Catamounts
16	F	Petra Nieminen	1.69 m (5 ft 7 in)	70 kg (150 lb)	4 May 1999 (aged 24)	(Sweden) Luleå HF
20	F	Anna-Kaisa Antti-Roiko	1.68 m (5 ft 6 in)	62 kg (137 lb)	21 May 2004 (aged 19)	(Finland) Kärpät Oulu
22	F	Julia Schalin	1.60 m (5 ft 3 in)	60 kg (130 lb)	31 August 2005 (aged 18)	(Finland) Kiekko-Espoo
24	F	Viivi Vainikka	1.66 m (5 ft 5 in)	67 kg (148 lb)	23 December 2001 (aged 22)	(Sweden) Luleå HF
28	F	Jenniina Nylund	1.71 m (5 ft 7 in)	63 kg (139 lb)	18 June 1999 (aged 24)	(Sweden) Brynäs IF
31	G	Tiia Pajarinen	1.65 m (5 ft 5 in)	69 kg (152 lb)	17 April 1998 (aged 25)	(Finland) Kiekko-Espoo
32	F	Emilia Vesa	1.77 m (5 ft 10 in)	66 kg (146 lb)	3 January 2001 (aged 23)	(Sweden) Frölunda HC
33	F	Michelle Karvinen – A	1.67 m (5 ft 6 in)	65 kg (143 lb)	27 March 1990 (aged 34)	(Sweden) Frölunda HC
34	F	Sofianna Sundelin	1.69 m (5 ft 7 in)	57 kg (126 lb)	13 January 2003 (aged 21)	(United States) St. Cloud State Huskies
36	G	Anni Keisala	1.75 m (5 ft 9 in)	80 kg (180 lb)	5 April 1997 (aged 26)	(Sweden) HV71
40	F	Noora Tulus – A	1.65 m (5 ft 5 in)	62 kg (137 lb)	15 August 1995 (aged 28)	(Sweden) Luleå HF
77	F	Susanna Tapani	1.77 m (5 ft 10 in)	68 kg (150 lb)	2 March 1993 (aged 31)	(United States) PWHL Boston
88	D	Ronja Savolainen	1.77 m (5 ft 10 in)	76 kg (168 lb)	29 November 1997 (aged 26)	(Sweden) Luleå HF
91	F	Julia Liikala	1.66 m (5 ft 5 in)	64 kg (141 lb)	20 March 2001 (aged 23)	(Finland) HIFK Helsinki

=== 2023 IIHF Women's World Championship ===
Roster for the 2023 IIHF Women's World Championship in Brampton, Canada, as published by the Finnish Ice Hockey Association on 21 March 2023.

Head coach: Juuso Toivola
Assistant coaches: Saara Niemi, Mikko Palsola, Tuomas Tarkki (goaltender)

No.	Pos.	Name	Height	Weight	Birthdate	Team
1	G	Sanni Ahola	1.71 m (5 ft 7 in)	75 kg (165 lb)	3 June 2000 (age 26)	(United States) St. Cloud State Huskies
2	D	Sini Karjalainen	1.74 m (5 ft 9 in)	68 kg (150 lb)	30 January 1999 (age 27)	(United States) Vermont Catamounts
4	D	Rosa Lindstedt	1.87 m (6 ft 2 in)	81 kg (179 lb)	24 January 1988 (age 38)	(Sweden) Brynäs IF
6	D	Jenni Hiirikoski – C	1.62 m (5 ft 4 in)	62 kg (137 lb)	30 March 1987 (age 39)	(Sweden) Luleå HF
7	D	Sanni Rantala	1.73 m (5 ft 8 in)	62 kg (137 lb)	8 July 2002 (age 24)	(Finland) KalPa
9	D	Nelli Laitinen	1.69 m (5 ft 7 in)	62 kg (137 lb)	29 April 2002 (age 24)	(United States) Minnesota Golden Gophers
12	F	Sanni Vanhanen	1.68 m (5 ft 6 in)	60 kg (130 lb)	1 July 2005 (age 21)	(Finland) HIFK
14	D	Krista Parkkonen	1.68 m (5 ft 6 in)	65 kg (143 lb)	25 June 2002 (age 24)	(United States) Vermont Catamounts
15	F	Oona Havana	1.71 m (5 ft 7 in)	65 kg (143 lb)	20 August 2004 (age 22)	(Finland) Kärpät
16	F	Petra Nieminen – A	1.69 m (5 ft 7 in)	67 kg (148 lb)	4 May 1999 (age 27)	(Sweden) Luleå HF
19	F	Emmi Rakkolainen	1.76 m (5 ft 9 in)	62 kg (137 lb)	9 August 1996 (age 30)	(Finland) Kiekko-Espoo
20	F	Anna-Kaisa Antti-Roiko	1.68 m (5 ft 6 in)	60 kg (130 lb)	21 May 2004 (age 22)	(Finland) Kärpät
24	F	Viivi Vainikka	1.66 m (5 ft 5 in)	67 kg (148 lb)	23 December 2001 (age 24)	(Sweden) Luleå HF
25	F	Kiira Yrjänen	1.61 m (5 ft 3 in)	58 kg (128 lb)	2 January 2002 (age 24)	(Sweden) HV71
27	F	Anni Montonen	1.69 m (5 ft 7 in)	60 kg (130 lb)	7 May 2000 (age 26)	(Finland) Kiekko-Espoo
28	F	Jenniina Nylund	1.71 m (5 ft 7 in)	63 kg (139 lb)	18 June 1999 (age 27)	(United States) St. Cloud State Huskies
30	G	Emilia Kyrkkö	1.69 m (5 ft 7 in)	68 kg (150 lb)	24 February 2004 (age 22)	(Finland) Team Kuortane
32	F	Emilia Vesa	1.77 m (5 ft 10 in)	66 kg (146 lb)	3 January 2001 (age 25)	(Finland) HIFK
34	F	Sofianna Sundelin	1.69 m (5 ft 7 in)	56 kg (123 lb)	13 January 2003 (age 23)	(Finland) Team Kuortane
36	G	Anni Keisala	1.75 m (5 ft 9 in)	80 kg (180 lb)	5 April 1997 (age 29)	(Sweden) HV71
40	F	Noora Tulus – A	1.65 m (5 ft 5 in)	59 kg (130 lb)	15 August 1995 (age 31)	(Sweden) Luleå HF
88	D	Ronja Savolainen	1.77 m (5 ft 10 in)	74 kg (163 lb)	29 November 1997 (age 28)	(Sweden) Luleå HF
91	F	Julia Liikala	1.66 m (5 ft 5 in)	64 kg (141 lb)	20 March 2001 (age 25)	(Finland) HIFK

=== 2022 IIHF Women's World Championship ===
Roster for the 2022 IIHF Women's World Championship in Herning and Frederikshavn, Denmark, as published by the Finnish Ice Hockey Association on 3 August 2022.

Head coach: Juuso Toivola
Assistant coaches: Saara Niemi, Mikko Palsola, Vesa Virta

No.	Pos.	Name	Height	Weight	Birthdate	Team
2	D	Sini Karjalainen	1.74 m (5 ft 9 in)	68 kg (150 lb)	30 January 1999 (age 27)	(United States) Vermont Catamounts
6	D	Jenni Hiirikoski – C	1.62 m (5 ft 4 in)	62 kg (137 lb)	30 March 1987 (age 39)	(Sweden) Luleå HF
7	D	Sanni Rantala	1.73 m (5 ft 8 in)	62 kg (137 lb)	8 July 2002 (age 24)	(Finland) KalPa
8	D	Ella Viitasuo	1.72 m (5 ft 8 in)	69 kg (152 lb)	27 May 1996 (age 30)	(Sweden) HV71
9	D	Nelli Laitinen	1.69 m (5 ft 7 in)	62 kg (137 lb)	29 April 2002 (age 24)	(United States) Minnesota Golden Gophers
10	F	Elisa Holopainen	1.66 m (5 ft 5 in)	58 kg (128 lb)	27 December 2001 (age 24)	(Finland) KalPa
12	F	Sanni Vanhanen	1.68 m (5 ft 6 in)	60 kg (130 lb)	1 July 2005 (age 21)	(Finland) HIFK
14	D	Krista Parkkonen	1.68 m (5 ft 6 in)	65 kg (143 lb)	25 June 2002 (age 24)	(United States) Vermont Catamounts
16	F	Petra Nieminen – A	1.69 m (5 ft 7 in)	67 kg (148 lb)	4 May 1999 (age 27)	(Sweden) Luleå HF
18	G	Meeri Räisänen	1.70 m (5 ft 7 in)	66 kg (146 lb)	2 December 1989 (age 36)	(United States) Connecticut Whale
19	F	Emmi Rakkolainen	1.76 m (5 ft 9 in)	62 kg (137 lb)	9 August 1996 (age 30)	(Finland) Kiekko-Espoo
24	F	Viivi Vainikka	1.66 m (5 ft 5 in)	67 kg (148 lb)	23 December 2001 (age 24)	(Sweden) Luleå HF
25	F	Kiira Yrjänen	1.61 m (5 ft 3 in)	58 kg (128 lb)	2 January 2002 (age 24)	(Sweden) HV71
28	F	Jenniina Nylund	1.71 m (5 ft 7 in)	63 kg (139 lb)	18 June 1999 (age 27)	(United States) St. Cloud State Huskies
31	G	Jenna Silvonen	1.65 m (5 ft 5 in)	61 kg (134 lb)	2 January 1999 (age 27)	(Finland) Kiekko-Espoo
32	F	Emilia Vesa	1.77 m (5 ft 10 in)	66 kg (146 lb)	3 January 2001 (age 25)	(Finland) HIFK
33	F	Michelle Karvinen – A	1.67 m (5 ft 6 in)	65 kg (143 lb)	27 March 1990 (age 36)	(Sweden) Frölunda HC
34	F	Sofianna Sundelin	1.69 m (5 ft 7 in)	56 kg (123 lb)	13 January 2003 (age 23)	(Finland) Team Kuortane
36	G	Anni Keisala	1.75 m (5 ft 9 in)	80 kg (180 lb)	5 April 1997 (age 29)	(Sweden) HV71
40	F	Noora Tulus	1.65 m (5 ft 5 in)	59 kg (130 lb)	15 August 1995 (age 31)	(Sweden) Luleå HF
77	F	Susanna Tapani	1.77 m (5 ft 10 in)	68 kg (150 lb)	2 March 1993 (age 33)	
88	D	Ronja Savolainen	1.77 m (5 ft 10 in)	74 kg (163 lb)	29 November 1997 (age 28)	(Sweden) Luleå HF
91	F	Julia Liikala	1.66 m (5 ft 5 in)	64 kg (141 lb)	20 March 2001 (age 25)	(Finland) HIFK

=== 2021 IIHF Women's World Championship ===
Roster for the 2021 IIHF Women's World Championship in Calgary, as published by the Finnish Ice Hockey Association on 3 August 2021.

Head coach: Pasi Mustonen
Assistant coaches: Kari Eloranta, Juuso Toivola, Vesa Virta

No.	Pos.	Name	Height	Weight	Birthdate	Team
23	F	Sanni Hakala	1.54 m (5 ft 1 in)	55 kg (121 lb)	31 October 1997 (age 29)	(Sweden) HV71
6	D	Jenni Hiirikoski - C	1.62 m (5 ft 4 in)	62 kg (137 lb)	30 March 1987 (age 39)	(Sweden) Luleå HF
10	F	Elisa Holopainen	1.65 m (5 ft 5 in)	55 kg (121 lb)	27 December 2001 (age 24)	(Finland) Kiekko-Espoo
21	D	Sini Karjalainen	1.73 m (5 ft 8 in)	62 kg (137 lb)	30 January 1999 (age 27)	(United States) University of Vermont
5	D	Aino Karppinen	1.68 m (5 ft 6 in)	68 kg (150 lb)	7 August 1998 (age 28)	(Finland) RoKi
33	F	Michelle Karvinen - A	1.67 m (5 ft 6 in)	69 kg (152 lb)	27 March 1990 (age 36)	(Switzerland) HC Ladies Lugano
1	G	Anni Keisala	1.74 m (5 ft 9 in)	75 kg (165 lb)	5 April 1997 (age 29)	(Finland) Ilves
9	D	Nelli Laitinen	1.69 m (5 ft 7 in)	62 kg (137 lb)	29 April 2002 (age 24)	(Finland) Kiekko-Espoo
27	F	Julia Liikala	1.66 m (5 ft 5 in)	55 kg (121 lb)	20 March 2001 (age 25)	(Finland) HIFK
4	D	Rosa Lindstedt	1.87 m (6 ft 2 in)	80 kg (180 lb)	24 January 1988 (age 38)	(Sweden) Brynäs IF
16	F	Petra Nieminen - A	1.69 m (5 ft 7 in)	64 kg (141 lb)	4 May 1999 (age 27)	(Sweden) Luleå HF
20	F	Matilda Nilsson	1.64 m (5 ft 5 in)	60 kg (130 lb)	2 March 1997 (age 29)	(Finland) HIFK
61	F	Tanja Niskanen	1.76 m (5 ft 9 in)	70 kg (150 lb)	11 September 1992 (age 34)	(Finland) KalPa
25	F	Jenniina Nylund	1.70 m (5 ft 7 in)	58 kg (128 lb)	18 June 1999 (age 27)	(United States) St. Cloud State University
18	G	Meeri Räisänen	1.70 m (5 ft 7 in)	64 kg (141 lb)	2 December 1989 (age 36)	(Finland) JYP-Akatemia
88	D	Ronja Savolainen	1.76 m (5 ft 9 in)	72 kg (159 lb)	29 November 1997 (age 28)	(Sweden) Luleå HF
31	G	Jenna Silvonen	1.64 m (5 ft 5 in)	63 kg (139 lb)	2 January 1999 (age 27)	(United States) Mercyhurst University
26	F	Sofianna Sundelin	1.68 m (5 ft 6 in)	54 kg (119 lb)	13 January 2003 (age 23)	(Finland) Team Kuortane
77	F	Susanna Tapani	1.77 m (5 ft 10 in)	65 kg (143 lb)	2 March 1993 (age 33)	(Finland) TPS U18 Akatemia
40	F	Noora Tulus	1.65 m (5 ft 5 in)	64 kg (141 lb)	15 August 1995 (age 31)	(Sweden) Luleå HF
15	D	Minttu Tuominen	1.65 m (5 ft 5 in)	71 kg (157 lb)	26 January 1990 (age 36)	(Finland) Kiekko-Espoo
24	F	Viivi Vainikka	1.65 m (5 ft 5 in)	64 kg (141 lb)	23 December 2001 (age 24)	(Sweden) Luleå HF
12	F	Sanni Vanhanen	1.65 m (5 ft 5 in)	57 kg (126 lb)	1 July 2005 (age 21)	(Finland) Ilves/Tappara U16
22	F	Emilia Vesa	1.77 m (5 ft 10 in)	72 kg (159 lb)	3 January 2001 (age 25)	(Finland) Kiekko-Espoo
8	D	Ella Viitasuo	1.72 m (5 ft 8 in)	67 kg (148 lb)	27 May 1996 (age 30)	(Finland) Kiekko-Espoo

=== 2020 IIHF Women's World Championship ===
The Finnish roster published for the 2020 IIHF Women's World Championship in Halifax and Truro, Nova Scotia. The tournament was ultimately cancelled due to the COVID-19 pandemic, with no games played.

Head Coach: Pasi Mustonen

No.	Pos.	Name	Height	Weight	Birthdate	Team
18	G	Meeri Räisänen	1.70 m (5 ft 7 in)	64 kg (141 lb)	2 December 1989 (age 36)	(Sweden) AIK IF
41	G	Noora Räty	1.65 m (5 ft 5 in)	65 kg (143 lb)	29 May 1989 (age 37)	(China) KRS Vanke Rays
31	G	Jenna Silvonen	1.64 m (5 ft 5 in)	63 kg (139 lb)	2 January 1999 (age 27)	(United States) Mercyhurst Lakers
6	D	Jenni Hiirikoski – C	1.62 m (5 ft 4 in)	62 kg (137 lb)	30 March 1987 (age 39)	(Sweden) Luleå HF
21	D	Sini Karjalainen	1.73 m (5 ft 8 in)	62 kg (137 lb)	30 January 1999 (age 27)	(United States) Vermont Catamounts
9	D	Nelli Laitinen	1.69 m (5 ft 7 in)	62 kg (137 lb)	29 April 2002 (age 24)	(Finland) Kiekko-Espoo
4	D	Rosa Lindstedt	1.87 m (6 ft 2 in)	80 kg (180 lb)	24 January 1988 (age 38)	(Sweden) HV71
7	D	Sanni Rantala	1.73 m (5 ft 8 in)	63 kg (139 lb)	8 July 2002 (age 24)	(Finland) Team Kuortane
88	D	Ronja Savolainen	1.76 m (5 ft 9 in)	72 kg (159 lb)	29 November 1997 (age 28)	(Sweden) Luleå HF
15	D	Minttu Tuominen	1.65 m (5 ft 5 in)	71 kg (157 lb)	26 January 1990 (age 36)	(Finland) Kiekko-Espoo
23	F	Sanni Hakala	1.54 m (5 ft 1 in)	55 kg (121 lb)	31 October 1997 (age 29)	(Sweden) HV71
12	F	Elisa Holopainen	1.65 m (5 ft 5 in)	55 kg (121 lb)	27 December 2001 (age 24)	(Finland) KalPa
12	F	Ida Karjalainen	1.66 m (5 ft 5 in)	62 kg (137 lb)	11 April 1997 (age 29)	(Finland) HPK
33	F	Michelle Karvinen – A	1.67 m (5 ft 6 in)	69 kg (152 lb)	27 March 1990 (age 36)	(Sweden) Luleå HF
27	F	Julia Liikala	1.66 m (5 ft 5 in)	55 kg (121 lb)	20 March 2001 (age 25)	(Finland) HPK
16	F	Petra Nieminen	1.69 m (5 ft 7 in)	64 kg (141 lb)	4 May 1999 (age 27)	(Sweden) Luleå HF
20	F	Matilda Nilsson	1.64 m (5 ft 5 in)	60 kg (130 lb)	2 March 1997 (age 29)	(Finland) KalPa
61	F	Tanja Niskanen	1.76 m (5 ft 9 in)	70 kg (150 lb)	11 September 1992 (age 34)	(Finland) KalPa
19	F	Emmi Rakkolainen	1.74 m (5 ft 9 in)	60 kg (130 lb)	9 August 1996 (age 30)	(Finland) Kiekko-Espoo
66	F	Susanna Tapani	1.77 m (5 ft 10 in)	65 kg (143 lb)	2 March 1993 (age 33)	(Finland) TPS Akatemia
40	F	Noora Tulus	1.65 m (5 ft 5 in)	64 kg (141 lb)	15 August 1995 (age 31)	(Sweden) Luleå HF
24	F	Viivi Vainikka	1.65 m (5 ft 5 in)	64 kg (141 lb)	23 December 2001 (age 24)	(Finland) Team Kuortane
2	F	Kiira Yrjänen	1.61 m (5 ft 3 in)	60 kg (130 lb)	2 January 2002 (age 24)	(Finland) Team Kuortane

=== 2019 IIHF Women's World Championship ===
The Finnish roster for the 2019 IIHF Women's World Championship in Espoo.

Head Coach: Pasi Mustonen

No.	Pos.	Name	Height	Weight	Birthdate	2018–19 Team
1	G	Eveliina Suonpää	1.74 m (5 ft 9 in)	68 kg (150 lb)	12 April 1995	(Sweden) Linköpings HC
2	D	Isa Rahunen	1.64 m (5 ft 5 in)	67 kg (148 lb)	16 April 1993	(Finland) Oulun Kärpät
4	D	Rosa Lindstedt	1.87 m (6 ft 2 in)	80 kg (180 lb)	24 January 1988	(Sweden) HV71
6	D	Jenni Hiirikoski – C	1.62 m (5 ft 4 in)	62 kg (137 lb)	30 March 1987	(Sweden) Luleå HF
7	D	Nelli Laitinen	1.69 m (5 ft 7 in)	62 kg (137 lb)	29 April 2002	(Finland) Espoo Blues
8	D	Ella Viitasuo	1.72 m (5 ft 8 in)	67 kg (148 lb)	27 May 1996	(Finland) Espoo Blues
9	F	Venla Hovi	1.69 m (5 ft 7 in)	67 kg (148 lb)	28 October 1987	(Canada) Calgary Inferno
10	F	Linda Välimäki	1.66 m (5 ft 5 in)	69 kg (152 lb)	31 May 1990	(Finland) Ilves
11	F	Annina Rajahuhta	1.65 m (5 ft 5 in)	72 kg (159 lb)	8 March 1989	(Finland) Espoo Blues
12	F	Elisa Holopainen	1.65 m (5 ft 5 in)	55 kg (121 lb)	27 December 2001	(Finland) KalPa
13	F	Riikka Välilä – A	1.63 m (5 ft 4 in)	60 kg (130 lb)	12 June 1973	(Sweden) HV71
15	D	Minttu Tuominen	1.65 m (5 ft 5 in)	71 kg (157 lb)	26 January 1990	(Finland) Espoo Blues
19	F	Petra Nieminen	1.69 m (5 ft 7 in)	64 kg (141 lb)	4 May 1999	(Sweden) Luleå HF
22	F	Emma Nuutinen	1.76 m (5 ft 9 in)	73 kg (161 lb)	7 December 1996	(United States) Mercyhurst Lakers
23	F	Sanni Hakala	1.54 m (5 ft 1 in)	55 kg (121 lb)	31 October 1997	(Sweden) HV71
24	F	Noora Tulus	1.65 m (5 ft 5 in)	64 kg (141 lb)	15 August 1995	(Sweden) Luleå HF
25	F	Viivi Vainikka	1.65 m (5 ft 5 in)	64 kg (141 lb)	23 December 2001	(Finland) Team Kuortane
31	G	Jenna Silvonen	1.64 m (5 ft 5 in)	63 kg (139 lb)	2 January 1999	(Finland) Espoo Blues
33	F	Michelle Karvinen – A	1.67 m (5 ft 6 in)	69 kg (152 lb)	27 March 1990	(Sweden) Luleå HF
41	G	Noora Räty	1.65 m (5 ft 5 in)	65 kg (143 lb)	29 May 1989	(China) Shenzhen KRS Vanke Rays
61	F	Tanja Niskanen	1.76 m (5 ft 9 in)	70 kg (150 lb)	11 September 1992	(Finland) KalPa
77	F	Susanna Tapani	1.77 m (5 ft 10 in)	65 kg (143 lb)	2 March 1993	(Sweden) Linköpings HC
88	D	Ronja Savolainen	1.76 m (5 ft 9 in)	72 kg (159 lb)	29 November 1997	(Sweden) Luleå HF

=== 2017 IIHF Women's World Championship ===
The Finnish roster for the 2017 IIHF Women's World Championship in Plymouth Township, Michigan.

Head Coach: Pasi Mustonen

Ages are listed as of the start of the tournament, 31 March 2017

No.	Pos.	Name	Height	Weight	Birthdate	2016–17 Team
2	D	Isa Rahunen	1.65 m (5 ft 5 in)	65 kg (143 lb)	16 April 1993 (aged 23)	(Finland) Oulun Kärpät
3	F	Linnea Melotindos	1.60 m (5 ft 3 in)	70 kg (150 lb)	29 July 2000 (aged 16)	(Finland) Team Kuortane
4	D	Rosa Lindstedt	1.86 m (6 ft 1 in)	80 kg (180 lb)	24 January 1988 (aged 29)	(Sweden) HV71
5	D	Anna Kilponen	1.69 m (5 ft 7 in)	74 kg (163 lb)	16 May 1995 (aged 21)	(United States) UND
6	D	Jenni Hiirikoski – C	1.62 m (5 ft 4 in)	64 kg (141 lb)	30 March 1987 (aged 30)	(Sweden) Luleå HF
7	D	Mira Jalosuo	1.84 m (6 ft 0 in)	80 kg (180 lb)	3 February 1989 (aged 28)	(Finland) Oulun Kärpät
8	D	Ronja Savolainen	1.75 m (5 ft 9 in)	72 kg (159 lb)	29 November 1997 (aged 19)	(Sweden) Luleå HF
9	F	Venla Hovi	1.70 m (5 ft 7 in)	68 kg (150 lb)	28 October 1987 (aged 29)	(Canada) Manitoba Bisons
10	F	Linda Välimäki	1.66 m (5 ft 5 in)	70 kg (150 lb)	31 May 1990 (aged 26)	(Finland) Espoo Blues
11	F	Petra Nieminen	1.68 m (5 ft 6 in)	62 kg (137 lb)	4 May 1999 (aged 17)	(Finland) Team Kuortane
12	F	Susanna Tapani	1.77 m (5 ft 10 in)	65 kg (143 lb)	2 March 1993 (aged 24)	(Finland) Lukko Rauma
13	F	Riikka Välilä – A	1.63 m (5 ft 4 in)	60 kg (130 lb)	12 June 1973 (aged 43)	(Sweden) HV71
14	F	Jenniina Nylund	1.70 m (5 ft 7 in)	60 kg (130 lb)	18 June 1999 (aged 17)	(Finland) Team Kuortane
16	F	Vilma Tanskanen	1.75 m (5 ft 9 in)	69 kg (152 lb)	14 April 1995 (aged 21)	(United States) UND
18	G	Meeri Raisanen	1.70 m (5 ft 7 in)	62 kg (137 lb)	2 December 1989 (aged 27)	(Finland) JYP Jyväskylä
19	F	Tanja Niskanen	1.76 m (5 ft 9 in)	71 kg (157 lb)	11 September 1992 (aged 24)	(Finland) KalPa Kuopio
20	F	Sari Kärnä	1.63 m (5 ft 4 in)	61 kg (134 lb)	2 April 1988 (aged 28)	(Finland) Ilves Tampere
21	F	Michelle Karvinen – A	1.66 m (5 ft 5 in)	69 kg (152 lb)	27 March 1990 (aged 27)	(Sweden) Luleå HF
22	F	Emma Nuutinen	1.76 m (5 ft 9 in)	74 kg (163 lb)	7 December 1996 (aged 20)	(United States) UND
23	D	Ella Viitasuo	1.72 m (5 ft 8 in)	70 kg (150 lb)	27 May 1996 (aged 20)	(Finland) Espoo Blues
24	F	Noora Tulus	1.65 m (5 ft 5 in)	68 kg (150 lb)	15 August 1995 (aged 21)	(Sweden) Luleå HF
26	F	Saana Valkama	1.68 m (5 ft 6 in)	68 kg (150 lb)	27 June 1994 (aged 22)	(United States) University of Vermont
27	F	Saila Saari	1.70 m (5 ft 7 in)	63 kg (139 lb)	1 November 1989 (aged 27)	(Finland) Oulun Kärpät
28	F	Sanni Hakala	1.54 m (5 ft 1 in)	53 kg (117 lb)	31 October 1997 (aged 19)	(Sweden) HV71
29	F	Sara Säkkinen	1.62 m (5 ft 4 in)	62 kg (137 lb)	7 April 1998 (aged 18)	(Finland) Team Kuortane
30	G	Anni Keisala	1.75 m (5 ft 9 in)	75 kg (165 lb)	5 April 1995 (aged 21)	(Finland) Oulun Kärpät
31	G	Eveliina Suonpää	1.74 m (5 ft 9 in)	66 kg (146 lb)	12 April 1995 (aged 21)	(Finland) Lukko Rauma
41	G	Noora Räty	1.65 m (5 ft 5 in)	69 kg (152 lb)	29 May 1989 (aged 27)	(Finland) Pyry Nokia (Suomi-sarja)
42	D	Sini Karjalainen	1.74 m (5 ft 9 in)	65 kg (143 lb)	30 January 1999 (aged 18)	(Finland) Team Kuortane
43	D	Mira Huhta	1.65 m (5 ft 5 in)	67 kg (148 lb)	28 October 1987 (aged 29)	(Finland) Espoo Blues

=== 2016 IIHF Women's World Championship ===
The Finnish roster for the 2016 IIHF Women's World Championship in Kamloops.

Head Coach: Pasi Mustonen

Ages are listed as of the start of the tournament, 28 March 2016

No.	Pos.	Name	Height	Weight	Birthdate	2015–16 Team
1	G	Tiina Ranne	1.65 m (5 ft 5 in)	62 kg (137 lb)	6 December 1994 (aged 21)	(Finland) JYP Jyväskylä
4	D	Rosa Lindstedt	1.86 m (6 ft 1 in)	79 kg (174 lb)	24 January 1988 (aged 28)	(Finland) JYP Jyväskylä
5	D	Anna Kilponen	1.69 m (5 ft 7 in)	74 kg (163 lb)	16 May 1995 (aged 20)	(United States) UND
6	D	Jenni Hiirikoski – C	1.62 m (5 ft 4 in)	61 kg (134 lb)	30 March 1987 (aged 28)	(Finland) JYP Jyväskylä
7	D	Mira Jalosuo	1.84 m (6 ft 0 in)	80 kg (180 lb)	3 February 1989 (aged 27)	(Sweden) Luleå HF
8	D	Ronja Savolainen	1.75 m (5 ft 9 in)	69 kg (152 lb)	29 November 1997 (aged 18)	(Finland) Espoo Blues
9	F	Venla Hovi	1.70 m (5 ft 7 in)	69 kg (152 lb)	28 October 1987 (aged 28)	(Canada) Manitoba Bisons
10	D	Ella Viitasuo	1.72 m (5 ft 8 in)	69 kg (152 lb)	27 May 1996 (aged 19)	(Finland) JYP Jyväskylä
11	F	Petra Nieminen	1.69 m (5 ft 7 in)	62 kg (137 lb)	4 May 1999 (aged 16)	(Finland) Team Kuortane
13	F	Riikka Välilä – A	1.63 m (5 ft 4 in)	60 kg (130 lb)	12 June 1973 (aged 42)	(Finland) JYP Jyväskylä
14	F	Sanni Hakala	1.54 m (5 ft 1 in)	52 kg (115 lb)	31 October 1997 (aged 18)	(Finland) JYP Jyväskylä
15	D	Minttu Tuominen	1.65 m (5 ft 5 in)	74 kg (163 lb)	26 June 1990 (aged 25)	(Finland) Espoo Blues
16	F	Vilma Tanskanen	1.75 m (5 ft 9 in)	69 kg (152 lb)	14 April 1995 (aged 20)	(United States) UND
18	G	Meeri Raisanen	1.70 m (5 ft 7 in)	62 kg (137 lb)	2 December 1989 (aged 26)	(Finland) JYP Jyväskylä
19	F	Tanja Niskanen	1.76 m (5 ft 9 in)	72 kg (159 lb)	11 September 1992 (aged 23)	(Finland) JYP Jyväskylä
20	F	Sari Kärnä	1.64 m (5 ft 5 in)	62 kg (137 lb)	2 April 1988 (aged 27)	(Finland) JYP Jyväskylä
21	F	Michelle Karvinen – A	1.66 m (5 ft 5 in)	69 kg (152 lb)	27 March 1990 (aged 26)	(Sweden) Luleå HF
23	F	Sara Säkkinen	1.62 m (5 ft 4 in)	61 kg (134 lb)	7 April 1998 (aged 17)	(Finland) Team Kuortane
24	F	Noora Tulus	1.65 m (5 ft 5 in)	66 kg (146 lb)	15 August 1995 (aged 20)	(Sweden) Luleå HF
25	F	Suvi Ollikainen	1.63 m (5 ft 4 in)	64 kg (141 lb)	6 March 1995 (aged 21)	(United States) SCSU
26	F	Saana Valkama	1.68 m (5 ft 6 in)	69 kg (152 lb)	27 June 1994 (aged 21)	(United States) University of Vermont
27	F	Saila Saari	1.70 m (5 ft 7 in)	63 kg (139 lb)	1 November 1989 (aged 26)	(Finland) JYP Jyväskylä
31	G	Anni Keisala	1.75 m (5 ft 9 in)	76 kg (168 lb)	5 April 1995 (aged 20)	(Finland) Team Kuortane

=== 2015 IIHF Women's World Championship ===
The Finnish roster for the 2015 IIHF Women's World Championship in Malmö.

Head Coach: Pasi Mustonen

Ages are listed as of the start of the tournament, 28 March 2015

No.	Pos.	Name	Height	Weight	Birthdate	2014-15 Team
1	G	Eveliina Suonpää	1.73 m (5 ft 8 in)	65 kg (143 lb)	12 April 1995 (aged 19)	(United States) UMD Bulldogs
2	D	Eve Savander	1.66 m (5 ft 5 in)	67 kg (148 lb)	2 September 1998 (aged 16)	(Finland) Team Kuortane
4	D	Rosa Lindstedt	1.86 m (6 ft 1 in)	79 kg (174 lb)	24 January 1988 (aged 27)	(Finland) JYP Jyväskylä
5	D	Anna Kilponen	1.69 m (5 ft 7 in)	74 kg (163 lb)	16 May 1995 (aged 19)	(Finland) Ilves Tampere
6	D	Jenni Hiirikoski – C	1.62 m (5 ft 4 in)	60 kg (130 lb)	30 March 1987 (aged 27)	(Finland) JYP Jyväskylä
7	D	Mira Jalosuo	1.84 m (6 ft 0 in)	80 kg (180 lb)	3 February 1989 (aged 26)	(Russia) SKIF Nizhny Novgorod
8	D	Ronja Savolainen	1.75 m (5 ft 9 in)	69 kg (152 lb)	29 November 1997 (aged 17)	(Finland) Espoo Blues
9	F	Jennica Haikarainen	1.74 m (5 ft 9 in)	75 kg (165 lb)	1 August 1989 (aged 25)	(Sweden) MoDo
10	F	Linda Välimäki	1.66 m (5 ft 5 in)	70 kg (150 lb)	30 May 1990 (aged 24)	(Finland) Espoo Blues
13	F	Riikka Välilä – A	1.63 m (5 ft 4 in)	60 kg (130 lb)	12 June 1973 (aged 41)	(Finland) JYP Jyväskylä
14	F	Niina Mäkinen	1.70 m (5 ft 7 in)	60 kg (130 lb)	18 April 1992 (aged 22)	(Finland) Oulun Kärpät
15	D	Minttu Tuominen	1.65 m (5 ft 5 in)	74 kg (163 lb)	26 June 1990 (aged 24)	(Finland) Espoo Blues
16	F	Vilma Tanskanen	1.75 m (5 ft 9 in)	69 kg (152 lb)	14 April 1995 (aged 19)	(Finland) Espoo Blues
18	G	Meeri Räisänen	1.70 m (5 ft 7 in)	63 lb (29 kg)	2 December 1989 (aged 25)	(Russia) SKIF Nizhny Novgorod
19	F	Tanja Niskanen	1.76 m (5 ft 9 in)	72 kg (159 lb)	11 September 1992 (aged 22)	(Finland) JYP Jyväskylä
20	F	Sari Kärnä	1.64 m (5 ft 5 in)	59 kg (130 lb)	2 April 1988 (aged 26)	(Finland) Ilves Tampere
21	F	Michelle Karvinen	1.66 m (5 ft 5 in)	69 kg (152 lb)	27 March 1990 (aged 25)	(Finland) Espoo Blues
24	F	Noora Tulus	1.65 m (5 ft 5 in)	65 kg (143 lb)	15 August 1995 (aged 19)	(Finland) Espoo Blues
25	F	Suvi Ollikainen	1.63 m (5 ft 4 in)	64 kg (141 lb)	6 March 1995 (aged 20)	(Finland) KJT Kerava
27	F	Saila Saari	1.70 m (5 ft 7 in)	63 kg (139 lb)	1 November 1989 (aged 25)	(Finland) JYP Jyväskylä
29	F	Karoliina Rantamäki	1.63 m (5 ft 4 in)	65 kg (143 lb)	23 February 1978 (aged 37)	(Russia) SKIF Nizhny Novgorod
31	G	Vilma Vaattovaara	1.71 m (5 ft 7 in)	68 kg (150 lb)	10 March 1993 (aged 22)	(United States) UNH Wildcats
77	F	Susanna Tapani	1.77 m (5 ft 10 in)	65 kg (143 lb)	2 March 1993 (aged 22)	(Finland) HPK Hameenlinna
96	F	Emma Nuutinen	1.76 m (5 ft 9 in)	74 kg (163 lb)	7 December 1996 (aged 18)	(Finland) Espoo Blues

=== 2013 IIHF Women's World Championship ===
The Finnish roster for the 2013 IIHF Women's World Championship in Ottawa.

Head Coach: Mika Pieniniemi

Ages are listed as of the start of the tournament, 2 April 2013

No.	Pos.	Name	Height	Weight	Birthdate	2014-15 Team
2	D	Vilma Tarvainen	1.57 m (5 ft 2 in)	69 kg (152 lb)	2 May 1986 (aged 26)	(Finland) Oulun Kärpät
3	D	Emma Terho – A	1.59 m (5 ft 3 in)	61 kg (134 lb)	17 December 1981 (aged 31)	(Finland) Espoo Blues
4	D	Rosa Lindstedt	1.86 m (6 ft 1 in)	80 kg (180 lb)	24 January 1988 (aged 25)	(Finland) JYP Jyväskylä
5	D	Anna Kilponen	1.69 m (5 ft 7 in)	73 kg (161 lb)	16 May 1995 (aged 17)	(Finland) Team Kuortane
6	D	Jenni Hiirikoski – C	1.62 m (5 ft 4 in)	60 kg (130 lb)	30 March 1987 (aged 26)	(Finland) JYP Jyväskylä
7	D	Mira Jalosuo	1.84 m (6 ft 0 in)	84 kg (185 lb)	3 February 1989 (aged 24)	(United States) UMN
8	F	Marjo Voutilainen	1.68 m (5 ft 6 in)	68 kg (150 lb)	22 March 1981 (aged 32)	(Finland) KalPa Kuopio
9	F	Venla Hovi	1.69 m (5 ft 7 in)	63 kg (139 lb)	28 October 1987 (aged 25)	(Finland) KalPa Kuopio
11	F	Annina Rajahuhta	1.64 m (5 ft 5 in)	68 kg (150 lb)	8 March 1989 (aged 24)	(Finland) Espoo Blues
12	F	Susanna Tapani	1.76 m (5 ft 9 in)	62 kg (137 lb)	2 March 1993 (aged 20)	(Finland) Espoo Blues
13	F	Linda Välimäki	1.66 m (5 ft 5 in)	69 kg (152 lb)	31 May 1990 (aged 22)	(Finland) Espoo Blues
14	F	Niina Mäkinen	1.70 m (5 ft 7 in)	60 kg (130 lb)	18 April 1992 (aged 20)	(Finland) Oulun Kärpät
15	F	Minnamari Tuominen	1.65 m (5 ft 5 in)	67 kg (148 lb)	26 June 1990 (aged 22)	(United States) OSU Buckeyes
18	D	Tea Villilä	1.68 m (5 ft 6 in)	63 lb (29 kg)	16 April 1991 (aged 21)	(United States) UMD Bulldogs
20	D	Saija Tarkki – A	1.72 m (5 ft 8 in)	60 kg (130 lb)	29 December 1982 (aged 30)	(Finland) Oulun Kärpät
21	F	Michelle Karvinen	1.66 m (5 ft 5 in)	69 kg (152 lb)	27 March 1990 (aged 23)	(United States) UND
23	F	Nina Tikkinen	1.70 m (5 ft 7 in)	66 kg (146 lb)	6 February 1987 (aged 26)	(Finland) Oulun Kärpät
26	F	Tiina Saarimäki	1.67 m (5 ft 6 in)	59 kg (130 lb)	10 June 1991 (aged 21)	(Finland) Ilves Tampere
28	F	Anne Tuomanen	1.66 m (5 ft 5 in)	62 kg (137 lb)	15 April 1987 (aged 25)	(Finland) Ilves Tampere
29	F	Karoliina Rantamäki	1.63 m (5 ft 4 in)	65 kg (143 lb)	23 February 1978 (aged 35)	(Russia) SKIF Nizhny Novgorod
30	G	Meeri Räisänen	1.70 m (5 ft 7 in)	60 kg (130 lb)	2 December 1989 (aged 23)	(Finland) JYP Jyväskylä
31	G	Isabella Portnoj	1.70 m (5 ft 7 in)	61 kg (134 lb)	15 February 1994 (aged 19)	(Finland) Espoo Blues
41	G	Noora Räty	1.65 m (5 ft 5 in)	68 kg (150 lb)	29 May 1989 (aged 23)	(United States) UMN
