= 2004 Air Canada Cup (women's tournament) =

Tournament details
- Host country: Germany
- Dates: 5 – 7 February 2004
- Teams: 4

Final positions
- Champions: Canada U22 (2nd title)
- Runners-up: Germany
- Third place: Switzerland

Tournament statistics
- Games played: 6

The 2004 Air Canada Cup was the second edition of the women's ice hockey tournament. It was held from February 5-7, 2004 in Garmisch-Partenkirchen and Bad Tölz, Germany. The Canadian U22 national team won the tournament, going undefeated over three games and defending the title they had won in 2003.

== Tournament ==
=== Results ===
Canada U22	6–1 (1-0, 3-0, 2-1)	Finland U20

Germany	1-1 (0-1, 1-0, 0-0)	Switzerland

Canada U22	6-0 (0-0, 2-0, 4-0)	Switzerland

Germany	4–0 (1-0, 2-0, 1-0)	Finland U20

Finland U20	3–3 (1-0, 2-1, 0-2)	Switzerland

Germany	3–5 (0-2, 2-0, 1-3)	Canada U22

=== Final table ===
Pos	Team	Pld	W	D	L	GF	GA	GD	Pts
1	Canada U22	3	3	0	0	17	4	+13	6
2	Germany	3	1	1	1	8	6	+2	3
3	Switzerland	3	0	2	1	4	10	−6	2
4	Finland U20	3	0	1	2	4	13	−9	1
