= 2003 Air Canada Cup (women's tournament) =

Tournament details
- Host country: Germany
- Dates: 6 – 8 February 2003
- Teams: 4

Final positions
- Champions: Canada U22 (1st title)
- Runners-up: Switzerland
- Third place: Finland U22

Tournament statistics
- Games played: 6

The 2003 Air Canada Cup was the first edition of the women's ice hockey tournament. It was held from 6–8 February 2003 in Hannover, Germany. The Canadian under-22 national team won the tournament, going undefeated over three games.

== Tournament ==
=== Results ===
Canada U22	4–1 (0-0, 4-0, 0-1)	Finland U22	Salzgitter

Germany	1-2 (0-2, 1-0, 0-0)	Switzerland	Braunlage

Canada U22	8-0 (4-0, 1-0, 3-0)	Switzerland	Hannover

Germany	2–2 (1-0, 0-1, 1-1)	Finland U22	Hannover

Finland U22	2–2 (1-0, 0-0, 1-2)	Switzerland	Hannover

Germany	1–6 (0-2, 0-3, 1-1)	Canada U22	Hannover

=== Final table ===
Pos	Team	Pld	W	D	L	GF	GA	GD	Pts
1	Canada U22	3	3	0	0	18	2	+16	6
2	Switzerland	3	1	1	1	4	11	−7	3
3	Finland U22	3	0	2	1	5	8	−3	2
4	Germany	3	0	1	2	4	10	−6	1
