= Finland women's national ice hockey team =

Women's national ice hockey team representing Finland

Finland
- Nickname: Naisleijonat ('Lady Lions')
- Association: Finnish Ice Hockey Association
- General manager: Kimmo Oikarinen
- Head coach: Tero Lehterä
- Assistants: Kari Martikainen
- Captain: Jenni Hiirikoski
- Most games: Karoliina Rantamäki (431)
- Top scorer: Riikka Sallinen (138)
- Most points: Riikka Sallinen (351)
- Team colors
- IIHF code: FIN
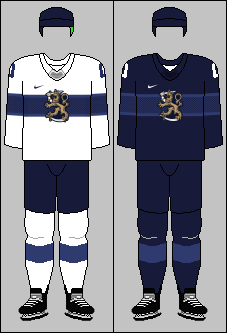

Ranking
- Current IIHF: 5 ▼2 (3 June 2026)
- Highest IIHF: 3 (first in 2003)
- Lowest IIHF: 4 (first in 2006)

First international
- Finland 6–0 Norway (Copenhagen, Denmark; 26 December 1988)

Biggest win
- Finland 34–0 Czechoslovakia (Düsseldorf, West Germany; 4 April 1989)

Biggest defeat
- Canada 15–0 Finland (St. John's, Canada; 12 November 2010)

Olympics
- Appearances: 8 (first in 1998)
- Medals: Bronze (1998, 2010, 2018, 2022)

World Championships
- Appearances: 25 (first in 1990)
- Best result: Silver: (2019)

European Championships
- Appearances: 5 (first in 1989)
- Best result: Gold: (1989, 1991, 1993, 1995)

International record (W–L–T)
- 356–251–13

Finland women's national ice hockey team
Medal record

Olympic Games
Bronze medal – third place	1998 Nagano	Team
Bronze medal – third place	2010 Vancouver	Team
Bronze medal – third place	2018 Pyeongchang	Team
Bronze medal – third place	2022 Beijing	Team

World Championships
Silver medal – second place	2019 Finland	
Bronze medal – third place	1990 Canada	
Bronze medal – third place	1992 Finland	
Bronze medal – third place	1994 United States	
Bronze medal – third place	1997 Canada	
Bronze medal – third place	1999 Finland	
Bronze medal – third place	2000 Canada	
Bronze medal – third place	2004 Canada	
Bronze medal – third place	2008 China	
Bronze medal – third place	2009 Finland	
Bronze medal – third place	2011 Switzerland	
Bronze medal – third place	2015 Sweden	
Bronze medal – third place	2017 United States	
Bronze medal – third place	2021 Canada	
Bronze medal – third place	2024 United States	
Bronze medal – third place	2025 Czechia	

European Championships
Gold medal – first place	1989 West Germany	
Gold medal – first place	1991 Czechoslovakia	
Gold medal – first place	1993 Denmark	
Gold medal – first place	1995 Latvia	
Bronze medal – third place	1996 Russia	

The Finnish women's national ice hockey team represents Finland at the International Ice Hockey Federation (IIHF) Women's World Championships, the Olympic Games, the Four Nations Cup, and other international-level women's ice hockey competitions. The women's national team is overseen by the Finnish Ice Hockey Association and its general manager is Tuula Puputti. Finland's national women's program is ranked third in the world by the IIHF and had 5,858 active players as of 2019.

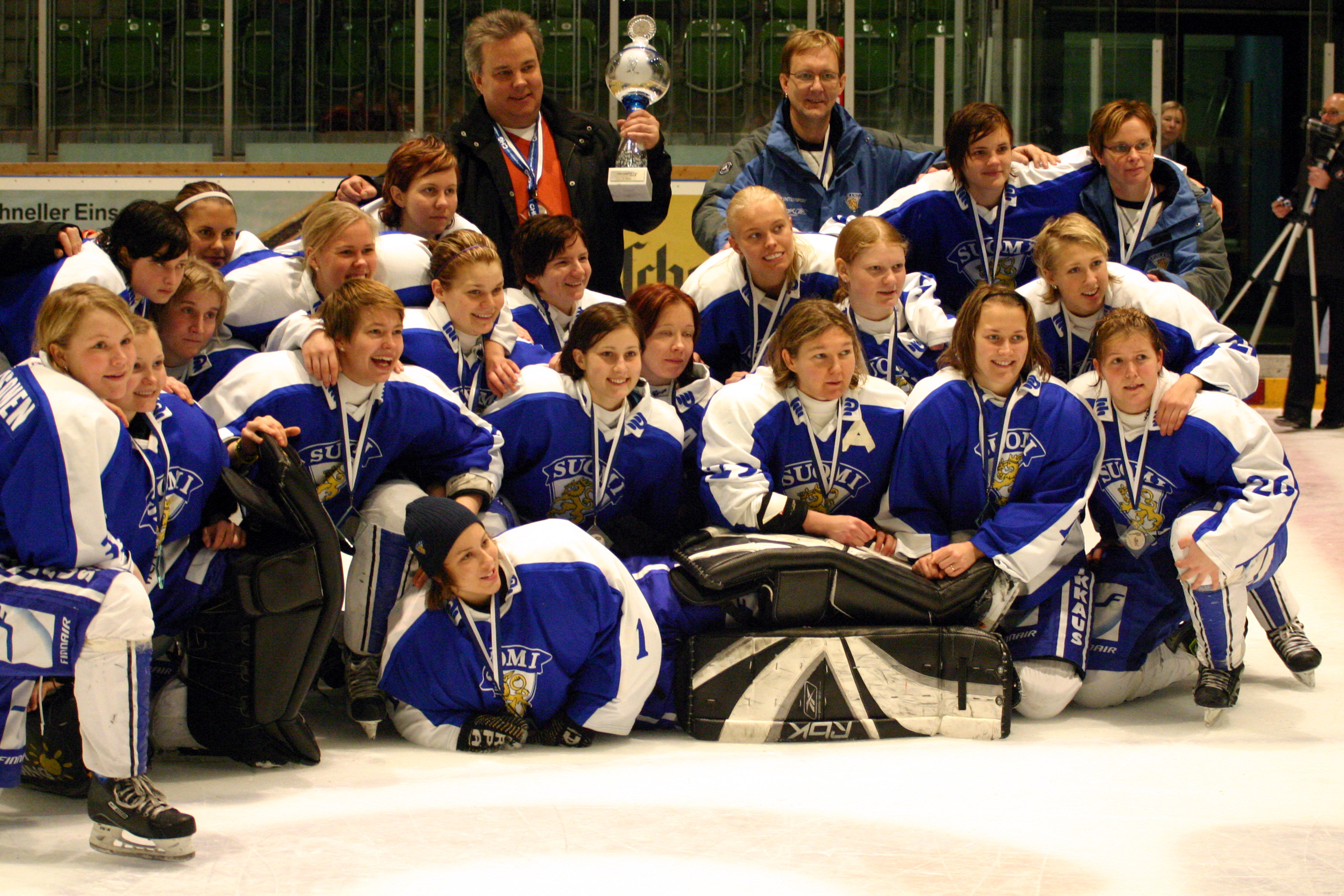
Finnish national women's ice hockey team at the Women's Air Canada Cup 2008 in Ravensburg, Germany.

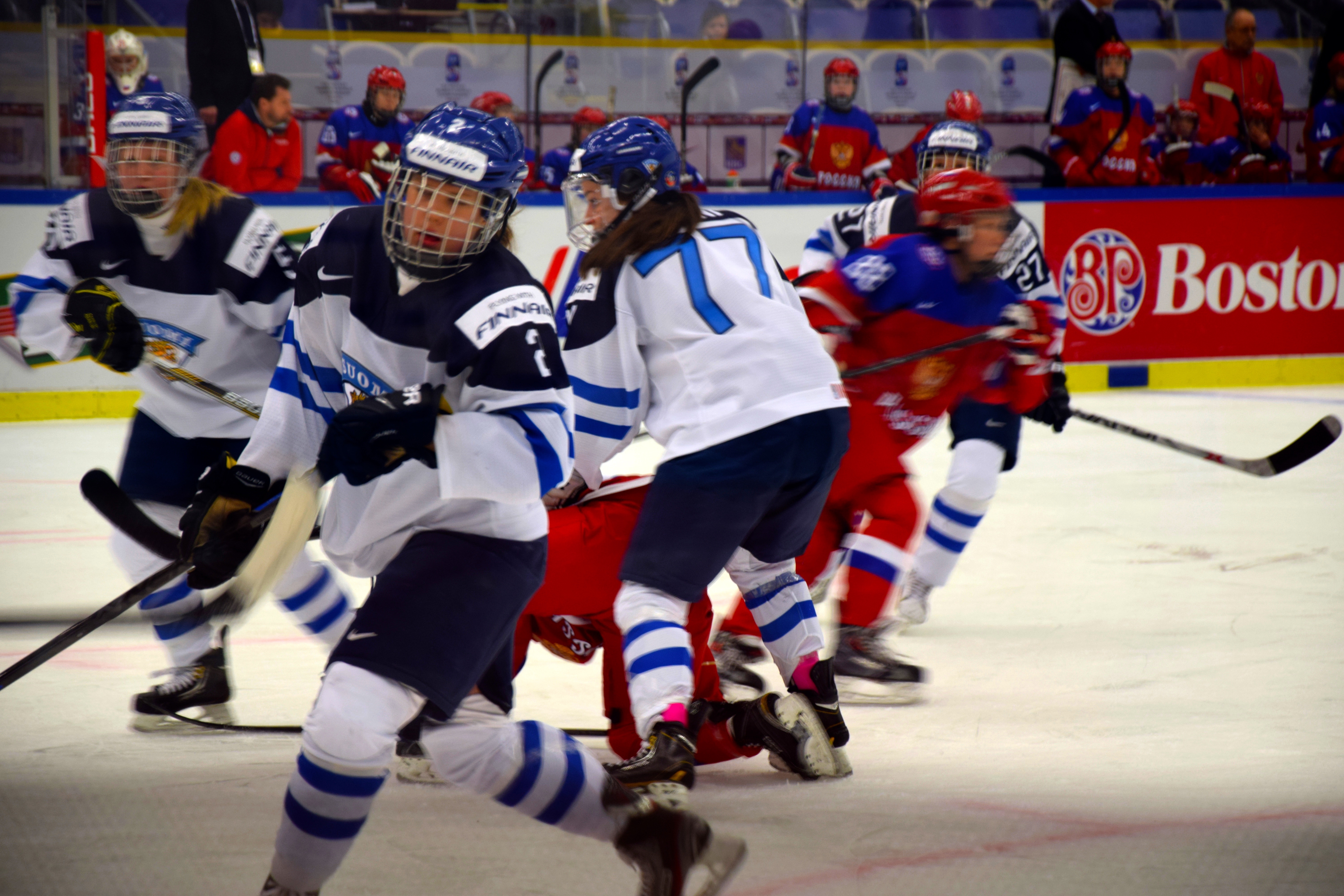
Finland against Russia in 2015 world championships

== History ==
Finland has finished third or fourth in almost every World Championships and Olympics, with one exception being a fifth place finish at the 2014 Winter Olympics and second place at the 2019 World Championship. They are ranked behind Canada (#2) and the United States (#1). Historically, Finland's primary rival was Sweden, which finished second to Canada at the 2006 Winter Olympics. Finland finished fourth, losing the game for the bronze medal to the United States. Finland defeated the United States for the first time, at the 2008 World Championship in China, 1–0 in overtime. Finland defeated Canada 4–3 for the first time at the 2017 World Championship in the United States. However, Finland lost the semi-final game against Canada in the same tournament, proceeding to win the bronze medal game.

At the 2019 World Championship, Finland reached the championship final for the first time in tournament history after beating Canada 4–2 in the semi-final. During the gold medal game, Petra Nieminen scored in overtime but her goal was overturned after a video review for goalie interference. The IIHF released a press statement the next day citing rules 186 and 183ii as the reasons for overturning the goal. Finland finished as runners-up and won a silver medal after losing to the United States in a shootout.

== Tournament record ==
=== Olympic Games ===
Games	Coach	Finish
(Japan) 1998 Nagano	Rauno Korpi	Bronze
(United States) 2002 Salt Lake City	Hannu Saintula	4th
(Italy) 2006 Turin	Hannu Saintula	4th
(Canada) 2010 Vancouver	Pekka Hämäläinen	Bronze
(Russia) 2014 Sochi	Mika Pieniniemi	5th
(South Korea) 2018 Pyeongchang	Pasi Mustonen	Bronze
(China) 2022 Beijing	Pasi Mustonen	Bronze
(Italy) 2026 Milan / Cortina	Tero Lehterä	6th
(France) 2030 French Alps	Future event	
(United States) 2034 Salt Lake City / Utah	Future event	

=== World Championships ===
Breaks indicate Olympic years.

Year	Location	Result
(Canada) 1990	Ottawa	Bronze
(Finland) 1992	Tampere	Bronze
(United States) 1994	Lake Placid	Bronze
(Canada) 1997	Ontario	Bronze
(Finland) 1999	Espoo	Bronze
(Canada) 2000	Ontario	Bronze
(United States) 2001	Minnesota	4th
(China) 2003	Beijing	Cancelled
(Canada) 2004	Halifax and Dartmouth	Bronze
(Sweden) 2005	Linköping and Norrköping	4th
(Canada) 2007	Winnipeg and Selkirk	4th
(China) 2008	Harbin	Bronze
(Finland) 2009	Hämeenlinna	Bronze
(Switzerland) 2011	Zürich	Bronze
(United States) 2012	Burlington	4th
(Canada) 2013	Ottawa	4th
(Sweden) 2015	Malmö	Bronze
(Canada) 2016	Kamloops	4th
(United States) 2017	Plymouth	Bronze
(Finland) 2019	Espoo	Silver
(Canada) 2020	Halifax and Truro	Cancelled
(Canada) 2021	Calgary	Bronze
(Denmark) 2022	Frederikshavn and Herning	6th
(Canada) 2023	Brampton	5th
(United States) 2024	Utica, New York	Bronze
(Czech Republic) 2025	České Budějovice	Bronze
(Denmark) 2026	Herning and Esbjerg	4th
(Canada) 2027	Quebec City	

=== European Championship ===
Year	Location	Result
(West Germany) 1989	Füssen, Landsberg am Lech and Kaufbeuren	Gold
(Czechoslovakia) 1991	Frýdek-Místek, Havířov	Gold
(Denmark) 1993	Esbjerg	Gold
(Latvia) 1995	Riga	Gold
(Russia) 1996	Yaroslavl	Bronze

=== 3/4 Nations Cup ===
- 1995 – Finished in 4th place (4 Nations Cup)
- 1996 – Won Bronze Medal
- 1997 – Won Bronze Medal
- 1998 – Won Bronze Medal
- 1999 – Won Bronze Medal
- 2000 – Won Bronze Medal (4 nations Cup)
- 2001 – Won Silver Medal
- 2002 – Won Bronze Medal (4 Nations Cup)
- 2003 – Won Bronze Medal (4 Nations Cup)
- 2004 – Finished in 4th place (4 Nations Cup)
- 2005 – Won Bronze Medal (4 Nations Cup)
- 2006 – Finished in 4th place (4 Nations Cup)
- 2007 – Won Bronze Medal (4 Nations Cup)
- 2008 – Finished in 4th place (4 Nations Cup)
- 2009 – Finished in 4th place (4 Nations Cup)
- 2010 – Won Bronze Medal (4 Nations Cup)
- 2011 – Finished in 4th place (4 Nations Cup)
- 2012 – Finished in 4th place (4 Nations Cup)
- 2013 – Won Silver Medal (4 Nations Cup)
- 2014 – Finished in 4th place (4 Nations Cup)
- 2015 – Won Bronze Medal (4 Nations Cup)
- 2016 – Won Bronze Medal (4 Nations Cup)
- 2017 – Won Bronze Medal (4 Nations Cup)
- 2018 – Won Bronze Medal (4 Nations Cup)

=== Women's Nations Cup ===
Formerly known as the Air Canada Cup, the MLP Nations Cup and the Meco Cup.

- 2003 – Won Bronze Medal (Air Canada Cup)
- 2004 – Finished in 4th place (Air Canada Cup)
- 2005 – Won Silver Medal (Air Canada Cup)
- 2006 – Won Silver Medal (Air Canada Cup)
- 2007 – Finished in 6th place (Air Canada Cup)
- 2008 – Won Silver Medal (Air Canada Cup)
- 2009 – Finished in 5th place ( MLP Nations Cup)
- 2010 – Finished in 5th place ( MLP Nations Cup)
- 2011 – Finished in 6th place ( MLP Nations Cup)
- 2012 – Won Silver Medal (Meco Cup)
- 2013 – Won Bronze Medal (Meco Cup)
- 2014 – Won Gold Medal (Meco Cup)
- 2015 – Won Bronze Medal (Meco Cup)
- 2016 – Won Silver Medal (Women's Nations Cup)
- 2017 – Won Gold Medal (Women's Nations Cup)
- 2018 – Won Bronze Medal (Women's Nations Cup)

=== Canada Cup ===
- 2009 Canada Cup – Won Bronze Medal

=== Women's Euro Hockey Tour ===
- 2019–20 – Finished in (gold)
- 2022–23 – Finished in (gold)
- 2023–24 – Finished in (silver)
- 2024–25 – Finished in (gold)
- 2025–26 – Finished in (gold)
- 2026–27 –

== Current roster ==
Roster for the 2026 IIHF Women's World Championship.

Head coach: Tero Lehterä

No.	Pos.	Name	Height	Weight	Birthdate	Team
1	G	Sanni Ahola	1.71 m (5 ft 7 in)	78 kg (172 lb)	3 June 2000 (age 26)	(Canada) Ottawa Charge
5	D	Siiri Yrjölä	1.66 m (5 ft 5 in)	69 kg (152 lb)	8 September 2004 (age 22)	(United States) St. Cloud State Huskies
6	D	Jenni Hiirikoski – C	1.61 m (5 ft 3 in)	62 kg (137 lb)	30 March 1987 (age 39)	(Sweden) Luleå HF
7	D	Sanni Rantala	1.73 m (5 ft 8 in)	65 kg (143 lb)	8 July 2002 (age 24)	(Sweden) Frölunda HC
9	D	Nelli Laitinen – A	1.68 m (5 ft 6 in)	64 kg (141 lb)	29 April 2002 (age 24)	(Canada) Hamilton Havoc
10	F	Elisa Holopainen	1.66 m (5 ft 5 in)	58 kg (128 lb)	27 December 2001 (age 24)	(United States) New York Sirens
11	D	Oona Koukkula	1.66 m (5 ft 5 in)	65 kg (143 lb)	22 August 2003 (age 23)	(Sweden) Brynäs IF
12	F	Sanni Vanhanen	1.68 m (5 ft 6 in)	67 kg (148 lb)	1 July 2005 (age 21)	(United States) Ohio State Buckeyes
14	D	Krista Parkkonen	1.68 m (5 ft 6 in)	64 kg (141 lb)	25 June 2002 (age 24)	(Sweden) Färjestad BK
15	F	Emmi Juusela	1.67 m (5 ft 6 in)	67 kg (148 lb)	13 February 2003 (age 23)	(Sweden) SDE HF
16	F	Petra Nieminen	1.69 m (5 ft 7 in)	73 kg (161 lb)	4 May 1999 (age 27)	(Canada) Montreal Victoire
18	F	Jenniina Nylund	1.71 m (5 ft 7 in)	62 kg (137 lb)	18 June 1999 (age 27)	(Sweden) Brynäs IF
20	F	Sofia Nuutinen	1.71 m (5 ft 7 in)	68 kg (150 lb)	14 June 2002 (age 24)	(United States) Mercyhurst Lakers
22	F	Julia Schalin	1.60 m (5 ft 3 in)	65 kg (143 lb)	31 August 2005 (age 21)	(United States) Minnesota Golden Gophers
24	F	Viivi Vainikka	1.66 m (5 ft 5 in)	66 kg (146 lb)	23 December 2001 (age 24)	(United States) Minnesota Frost
30	G	Emilia Kyrkkö	1.69 m (5 ft 7 in)	75 kg (165 lb)	24 February 2004 (age 22)	(United States) St. Cloud State Huskies
33	F	Michelle Karvinen	1.66 m (5 ft 5 in)	65 kg (143 lb)	27 March 1990 (age 36)	(Canada) Montreal Victoire
34	F	Sofianna Sundelin	1.69 m (5 ft 7 in)	61 kg (134 lb)	13 January 2003 (age 23)	(United States) St. Cloud State Huskies
35	G	Kerttu Kuja-Halkola	1.76 m (5 ft 9 in)	72 kg (159 lb)	2 September 2007 (age 19)	(Finland) IFK Helsinki
40	F	Noora Tulus – A	1.65 m (5 ft 5 in)	64 kg (141 lb)	15 August 1995 (age 31)	(Sweden) Brynäs IF
45	D	Nella Berg	1.75 m (5 ft 9 in)	72 kg (159 lb)	10 February 2005 (age 21)	(Sweden) Luleå HF
46	D	Tuuli Tallinen	1.77 m (5 ft 10 in)	75 kg (165 lb)	10 June 2006 (age 20)	(United States) Minnesota Duluth Bulldogs
61	F	Emma Nuutinen	1.77 m (5 ft 10 in)	75 kg (165 lb)	7 December 1996 (age 29)	(United States) Seattle Torrent
77	F	Susanna Tapani	1.77 m (5 ft 10 in)	70 kg (150 lb)	2 March 1993 (age 33)	(United States) Boston Fleet
91	F	Julia Liikala	1.66 m (5 ft 5 in)	58 kg (128 lb)	20 March 2001 (age 25)	(Sweden) Frölunda HC

== Awards and honors ==
=== World Championship ===
==== Directorate awards ====
- Best Goalie
  - Noora Räty: 2007, 2008, 2011, 2017, 2019
  - Anni Keisala: 2021
- Best Defenceman
  - Kirsi Hänninen: 1999
  - Jenni Hiirikoski: 2009, 2012, 2013, 2015, 2016, 2017, 2019
- Best Forward
  - Katja Riipi: 2000
  - Riikka Nieminen: 1990, 1994
- Most Valuable Player
  - Noora Räty: 2008
  - Jenni Hiirikoski: 2019

==== All-Star teams ====
- 1997: Riikka Nieminen (F)
- 2008: Noora Räty (G)
- 2009: Michelle Karvinen (F)
- 2011: Michelle Karvinen (F)
- 2013: Noora Räty (G)
- 2015: Jenni Hiirikoski (D), Meeri Räisänen (G)
- 2016: Jenni Hiirikoski (D), Meeri Räisänen (G)
- 2017: Jenni Hiirikoski (D), Noora Räty (G)
- 2019: Jenni Hiirikoski (D), Michelle Karvinen (F), Noora Räty (G)
- 2021: Anni Keisala (G), Petra Nieminen (F)
- 2023: Petra Nieminen (F)
- 2024: Sanni Ahola (G)

== See also ==
- Finland women's national under-18 ice hockey team
- List of Finland women's national ice hockey team rosters
- List of Olympic women's ice hockey players for Finland
- Women's ice hockey in Finland
- 2009–10 Finland women's national ice hockey team
