= 2006 Air Canada Cup =

Tournament details
- Host country: Germany
- Dates: 5 – 7 January 2006
- Teams: 4

Final positions
- Champions: Canada U23 (4th title)
- Runners-up: Finland U23
- Third place: Switzerland

Tournament statistics
- Games played: 6

The 2006 Air Canada Cup was the fourth edition of the women's ice hockey tournament. It was held from January 5-7, 2006 in Ravensburg, Germany. The Canadian U23 national team won the tournament, and their fourth consecutive title, finishing with a record of two wins and one loss over three games.

== Tournament ==
=== Results ===
Canada U23	4–1 (0-0, 3-0, 1-1)	Finland U23	Ravensburg

Germany	0–3 (0-0, 0-1, 0-2)	Switzerland	Ravensburg

Canada U23	10-1 (3-0, 4-0, 3-1)	Switzerland	Ravensburg

Germany	0–2 (0-0, 0-1, 0-1)	Finland U23	Ravensburg

Finland U23	5–2 (1-1, 1-0, 3-1)	Switzerland	Ravensburg

Germany	6–4 (1-2, 1-1, 4-1)	Canada U23	Ravensburg

=== Final table ===
Pos	Team	Pld	W	D	L	GF	GA	GD	Pts
1	Canada U23	3	2	0	1	18	8	+10	6
2	Finland U23	3	2	0	1	8	6	+2	6
3	Switzerland	3	1	0	2	6	15	−9	3
4	Germany	3	1	0	2	6	9	−3	3
