= Pasi Mustonen =

Finnish ice hockey coach

- Born: 11 October 1960 (age 66) Sotkamo, Kainuu, Finland
- Position: Defense
- Played for: JYP Jyväskylä; Nittorps IK
- Current coach: Finnish women's national ice hockey team
- Coached for: Lahti Pelicans (Assistant); Oulun Kärpät; Asplöven HC; Skellefteå AIK; Tingsryds AIF; Kiruna IF
- Playing career: 1975–1985
- Coaching career: 1991–present
Medal record
Men's ice hockey
Representing Finland
Universiade
Bronze medal – third place	1985 Belluno

Pasi Mustonen (born 11 October 1960) is a Finnish ice hockey coach and retired defenceman, currently serving as head coach of the Finnish women's national ice hockey team (Naisleijonat). He is the first coach of the women’s national team to be employed full time by the Finnish Ice Hockey Association. Mustonen has served as head coach of the women‘s national team since 2014 and is under contract through the 2022 Winter Olympics in Beijing. With Mustonen at the helm, the team won bronze at the 2018 Winter Olympics and claimed medals at three World Championships, including their first-ever silver medal in 2019.

Mustonen previously worked as assistant coach of the Oulun Kärpät and the Lahden Pelicans in the Liiga, head coach of Kärpät during the team’s years in the I-divisioona, and was head coach to a number of Swedish teams, including Asplöven HC and Kiruna IF of the Division 1, and Tingsryds AIF and Skellefteå AIK of the Allsvenskan.

== Career ==
During his playing career, Mustonen played as a defenceman in Finland’s I-divisoona and in the Swedish Division 1 and Division 2. He participated in the 1985 Winter Universiade and won bronze with the Finnish men's ice hockey team.

In the 1986, he became the junior coaching manager of the Ilves Tampere. In the late 1980s, he was the coaching manager of SC Rapperswil-Jona of the Swiss Nationalliga B. Mustonen's coaching career began in 1991–92 as head coach of Kärpät Oulu in the I-divisoona. In his first season, he coached the team to second in the regular season and all the way to the qualifiers before they were beaten by Tappara, 3–1. During Mustonen's second season with the team, Kärpät forward Matti Veivo was paralyzed after a severe injury sustained in an October match against Kalajoen Junkkarit. Mustonen and the team were deeply affected by Veivo‘s injury but were not permitted to delay or reschedule any matches and struggled as the season wore on. When he was fired by the club a month after the accident, Mustonen was not surprised.

After Kärpät, Mustonen worked as a coach in Sweden for eleven seasons. He first served as the head coach of Kiruna IF in the Division 1 from 1993–94 to 1996–97. In the first three seasons under Mustonen, the team finished the regular season in first or second place and participated in the Elitserien qualifiers, though they did not gain promotion. From 1997–98 to 2000–01, Mustonen coached Tingsryds AIF, which competed in the Division 1 during the 1997–98 and 1998–99 seasons before being elevated to the newly established Allsvenskan for the 1999–2000 season.

From 2001–02 to 2003–04, Mustonen coached Skellefteå AIK of the Allsvenskan. The team progressed to the Elitserien qualifiers in the spring of 2003 but was not promoted. He next coached the Division 1 team Asplöven HC in the 2008–09 season. He coached the team to first place in the regular season and on to the HockeyAllsvenskan qualifiers but Asplöven did not secure promotion.

For the 2011–12 and 2012–13 seasons, Mustonen returned to coaching with the Kärpät as an assistant coach to head coach Hannu Aravirta. He developed a good relationship with Aravirta and has cited the now-retired coach as the single person he learned the most from in his career. In the spring of 2013, the Lahti Pelicans announced that they had signed a one-year coaching agreement with Aravirta (as head coach) and Mustonen (as assistant coach) for the 2013–14 season.

=== National team ===
Pasi Mustonen
Medal record

Women's ice hockey (as head coach)

Representing Finland

Olympic Games
Bronze medal – third place	2018 Pyeongchang	Team

World Championship
Silver medal – second place	2019 Finland	
Bronze medal – third place	2017 United States	
Bronze medal – third place	2015 Sweden	

Mustonen was offered the Finnish women's national ice hockey team head coaching position at the suggestion of Aravirta, who had turned down the position in favor of retirement when Kalervo Kummola, chairman of the Finnish Ice Hockey Association, offered it in Spring 2014. Mustonen began in Summer 2014, despite having no previous women‘s coaching experience, and inherited a team that had been kept off the medal podium three consecutive times, ranking fourth at both the 2012 and 2013 IIHF Women's World Championships and fifth at the 2014 Winter Olympics, the lowest Olympic ranking in team history.

Finland saw success in the first major international tournament with Mustonen at the helm, the 2015 IIHF Women's World Championship, breaking its podium drought with a 4–1 win against Russia in the bronze medal game. In the following year, the team made it to the bronze medal game again but were ultimately denied a medal by Russia as the game came down to game-winning shots in overtime.

"I coach because of relationships. Sure, it’s been nice to win a medal or be a world champion for a while, but that’s not what it's about. The most important thing is the people.

— Mustonen on coaching

Since becoming head coach of the national team, he has been one of the most vocal advocates for women‘s ice hockey in Finland, calling attention to the devaluation of women‘s ice hockey by the hockey establishment and media in Finland, emphasizing the importance of men‘s teams taking an active role in fostering and supporting sister teams and girls' hockey programs, and discussing the areas in which traditional hockey culture needs to progress for the health of the game and those who participate in it. He has recommended implementing women‘s ice hockey rules, which do not allow body checking and require players wear full face protection, for all ice hockey competition as a step to limit traumatic brain injury in the sport. In 2019, Mustonen was recognized by the Finnish Ministry of Education and Culture as a finalist for the Piikkarit Award (Finnish: Piikkarit-palkinto) in honor of his continued work promoting gender equality and pluralism in sport.

== Personal life ==
Mustonen’s wife, Johanna, chose to relocate with him every time he moved for work – 24 or 25 times by his estimation – and he calls her his muse, saying "We are a team, and we don’t regret a day of the path we’ve taken."

Mustonen‘s son, Joel, is an ice hockey centre, currently playing with Frölunda HC of the Swedish Hockey League (SHL).
