= 2009 MLP Nations Cup =

Tournament details
- Host country: Germany
- Dates: 2 – 6 January 2009
- Teams: 6

Final positions
- Champions: Sweden (1st title)
- Runners-up: Canada U22
- Third place: Russia

Tournament statistics
- Games played: 11

The 2009 MLP Nations Cup was the seventh edition of the women's ice hockey tournament. It was held from January 2-6, 2009 in Ravensburg, Germany. Sweden won the tournament by defeating the defending champions Canada U22 in the final.

== Tournament ==
=== First round ===
==== Group A ====
Canada U22	3–0 (0-0, 1-0, 2-0)	Finland	Ravensburg

Russia	2–1 (1-0, 1-0, 0-1)	Finland	Ravensburg

Canada U22	11-0 (3-0, 5-0, 3-0)	Russia	Ravensburg

Pos	Team	Pld	W	OTW	OTL	L	GF	GA	GD	Pts
1	Canada U22	2	2	0	0	0	14	0	+14	6
2	Russia	2	1	0	0	1	2	12	−10	3
3	Finland	2	0	0	0	2	1	5	−4	0

==== Group B ====
Sweden	5–3 (1-2, 3-1, 1-0)	Switzerland	Ravensburg

Switzerland	3–4 (2-2, 0-0, 1-2)	Germany	Ravensburg

Germany	1–4 (1-2, 0-0, 0-2)	Sweden	Ravensburg

Pos	Team	Pld	W	OTW	OTL	L	GF	GA	GD	Pts
1	Sweden	2	2	0	0	0	9	4	+5	6
2	Germany	2	1	0	0	1	5	7	−2	3
3	Switzerland	2	0	0	0	2	6	9	−3	0

=== Final round ===
==== 5th place game ====
Switzerland	1–6 (0-2, 1-3, 0-1)	Finland	Ravensburg

==== Semifinals ====
Sweden	5–4 (4-1, 1-3, 0-0)	Russia	Ravensburg

Canada U22	3–0 (1-0, 0-0, 2-0)	Germany	Ravensburg

==== 3rd place game ====
Germany	0–2 (0-0, 0-1, 0-1)	Russia	Ravensburg

==== Final ====
Canada U22	1–2	Sweden	Ravensburg
