= 2008 Air Canada Cup =

Tournament details
- Host country: Germany
- Dates: 2 – 6 January 2008
- Teams: 6

Final positions
- Champions: Canada U22 (6th title)
- Runners-up: Finland
- Third place: Sweden

Tournament statistics
- Games played: 11

The 2008 Air Canada Cup was the sixth edition of the women's ice hockey tournament. It was held from January 2-6, 2008 in Ravensburg, Germany. The Canadian U22 national team won the tournament by defeating Finland in the final.

== Tournament ==
=== First round ===
==== Group A ====
Sweden	6–1 (1-0, 2-1, 3-0)	Switzerland	Ravensburg

Finland	5–0 (2-0, 2-0, 1-0)	Sweden	Ravensburg

Switzerland	1-4 (1-0, 0-1, 0-3)	Finland	Ravensburg

Pos	Team	Pld	W	OTW	OTL	L	GF	GA	GD	Pts
1	Finland	2	2	0	0	0	9	1	+8	6
2	Sweden	2	1	0	0	1	6	6	0	3
3	Switzerland	2	0	0	0	2	2	10	−8	0

==== Group B ====
Germany	1–4 (0-1, 0-2, 1-1)	Russia	Ravensburg

Russia	2–13 (0-2, 0-6, 2-5)	Canada U22	Ravensburg

Canada U22	7–0 (2-0, 4-0, 1-0)	Germany	Ravensburg

Pos	Team	Pld	W	OTW	OTL	L	GF	GA	GD	Pts
1	Canada U22	2	2	0	0	0	20	2	+18	6
2	Russia	2	1	0	0	1	6	14	−8	3
3	Germany	2	0	0	0	2	1	11	−10	0

=== Final round ===
==== 5th place game ====
Switzerland	3–2 (1-0, 0-1, 2-1)	Germany	Ravensburg

==== Semifinals ====
Canada U22	7–2 (4-1, 2-0, 1-1)	Sweden	Ravensburg

Finland	7–2 (1-1, 4-1, 2-0)	Russia	Ravensburg

==== 3rd place game ====
Sweden	4–3 (0-2, 2-1, 2-0)	Russia	Ravensburg

==== Final ====
Canada U22	7–5 (0–2, 4–2, 3–1)	Finland	Ravensburg
