= 2007 Air Canada Cup =

Tournament details
- Host country: Germany
- Dates: 3 – 7 January 2007
- Teams: 6

Final positions
- Champions: Canada U22 (5th title)
- Runners-up: Germany
- Third place: Switzerland

Tournament statistics
- Games played: 11

The 2007 Air Canada Cup was the fifth edition of the women's ice hockey tournament. It was held from January 3-7, 2007 in Ravensburg, Germany. The Canadian U22 national team won the tournament for their fifth title in a row, by defeating Germany in the final.

== Tournament ==
=== First round ===
==== Group A ====
Russia	6–0 (1-0, 3-0, 2-0)	Switzerland	Ravensburg

Finland U20	3–7 (1-2, 0-2, 2-3)	Russia	Ravensburg

Switzerland	4-1 (4-1, 0-0, 0-0)	Finland U20	Ravensburg

Pos	Team	Pld	W	OTW	OTL	L	GF	GA	GD	Pts
1	Russia	2	2	0	0	0	13	3	+10	6
2	Switzerland	2	1	0	0	1	4	7	−3	3
3	Finland U20	2	0	0	0	2	4	11	−7	0

==== Group B ====
Japan	0–10 (0-2, 0-3, 0-5)	Canada U22	Ravensburg

Germany	2–1 OT (0-0, 1-0, 0-1, 1-0)	Japan	Ravensburg

Canada U22	5–0 (0-0, 1-0, 4-0)	Germany	Ravensburg

Pos	Team	Pld	W	OTW	OTL	L	GF	GA	GD	Pts
1	Canada U22	2	2	0	0	0	15	0	+15	6
2	Germany	2	0	1	0	1	2	6	−4	2
3	Japan	2	0	0	1	1	1	12	−11	1

=== Final round ===
==== 5th place game ====
Finland U20	0–2 (0-0, 0-1, 0-1)	Japan	Ravensburg

==== Semifinals ====
Canada U22	11–0 (2-0, 6-0, 3-0)	Switzerland	Ravensburg

Russia	0–5 (0-1, 0-3, 0-1)	Germany	Ravensburg

==== 3rd place game ====
Switzerland	5–2 (0-0, 1-1, 4-1)	Russia	Ravensburg

==== Final ====
Canada U22	6–1 (1-1, 3-0, 2-0)	Germany	Ravensburg
