= 2010 MLP Nations Cup =

Tournament details
- Host country: Germany
- Dates: 5 – 9 January 2010
- Teams: 6

Final positions
- Champions: Canada U22 (7th title)
- Runners-up: Switzerland
- Third place: Sweden

Tournament statistics
- Games played: 11

The 2010 MLP Nations Cup was the eighth edition of the women's ice hockey tournament. It was held from January 5-9, 2010 in Ravensburg, Germany. The Canadian U22 national team won the tournament by defeating Switzerland in the final.

== Tournament ==
=== First round ===
==== Group A ====
Sweden	4–1 (0-0, 1-1, 3-0)	Finland	Ravensburg

Russia	3–4 OT (1-2, 1-1, 1-0, 0-1)	Finland	Ravensburg

Sweden	2-3 (2-0, 0-0, 0-3)	Russia	Ravensburg

Pos	Team	Pld	W	OTW	OTL	L	GF	GA	GD	Pts
1	Russia	2	1	0	1	0	6	6	0	4
2	Sweden	2	1	0	0	1	6	4	+2	3
3	Finland	2	0	1	0	1	5	7	−2	2

==== Group B ====
Canada U22	4–1 (1-0, 2-1, 1-0)	Switzerland	Ravensburg

Switzerland	5–4 OT (3-2, 1-2, 0-0, 1-0)	Germany	Ravensburg

Germany	0–7 (0-2, 0-2, 0-3)	Canada U22	Ravensburg

Pos	Team	Pld	W	OTW	OTL	L	GF	GA	GD	Pts
1	Canada U22	2	2	0	0	0	11	1	+10	6
2	Switzerland	2	0	1	0	1	6	8	−2	2
3	Germany	2	0	0	1	1	4	12	−8	1

=== Final round ===
==== 5th place game ====
Finland	4–0 (1-0, 1-0, 2-0)	Germany	Ravensburg

==== Semifinals ====
Canada U22	4–3 OT (3-0, 0-2, 0-1, 1-0)	Sweden	Ravensburg

Russia	5–6 (0-1, 5-4, 0-0, 0-1)	Switzerland	Ravensburg

==== 3rd place game ====
Sweden	5–3 (2-0, 3-1, 0-2)	Russia	Ravensburg

==== Final ====
Canada U22	9–0 (4-0, 5-0, 0-0)	Switzerland	Ravensburg
