= Nations Cup (women's ice hockey) =

Women's ice hockey tournament

The Women's Nations Cup (formerly known as the Air Canada Cup, the MLP Nations Cup and the Meco Cup) is an annual women's ice hockey tournament, held in Germany, Austria and Switzerland. Six nations participate in the tournament, five countries with their national teams, and Canada who send their national under-22 team.

== Results ==
Year	Host	Gold Medal Game			Bronze Medal Game		
Year	Host	Champion	Score	Second Place	Third Place	Score	Fourth Place
2003; Details	Hannover, Germany	Canada	Round robin	Switzerland	Finland	Round robin	Germany
2004; Details	Garmisch-Partenkirchen, Germany	Canada	Round robin	Germany	Switzerland	Round robin	Finland
2005; Details	Duisburg, Germany	Canada	Round robin	Finland	Switzerland	Round robin	Germany
2006; Details	Ravensburg, Germany	Canada	Round robin	Finland	Switzerland	Round robin	Germany
2007; Details	Ravensburg, Germany	Canada	6–1	Germany	Switzerland	5–2	Russia
2008; Details	Ravensburg, Germany	Canada	7–5	Finland	Sweden	4–3	Russia
2009; Details	Ravensburg, Germany	Sweden	2–1	Canada	Russia	2–0	Germany
2010; Details	Ravensburg, Germany	Canada	9–0	Switzerland	Sweden	5–3	Russia
2011; Details	Kreuzlingen, Switzerland	Canada	6–0	Sweden	Russia	7–2	Germany
2012; Details	Füssen, Germany	Sweden	Round robin	Finland	Canada	Round robin	Switzerland
2013; Details	Füssen, Buchloe, Ravensburg, Germany	Canada	8–3	Russia	Finland	6–3	Germany
2014; Details	(Germany); Garmisch-Partenkirchen, Füssen, Germany Dornbirn, Austria	Finland	4–0	Sweden	Russia	8–1	Austria
2015; Details	Füssen, Germany	Canada	4–0	Sweden	Finland	6–0	Germany
2016; Details	Füssen, Germany	Canada	4–3 OT	Finland	Russia	2–1	Germany
2017; Details	(Germany); Füssen, Germany Telfs, Austria	Finland	1–0	Canada	Russia	5–2	Germany
2018; Details	Füssen, Germany	Russia	4–1	Sweden	Finland	4–3 OT	Switzerland

== Overall medal count ==
Rank	Nation	Gold	Silver	Bronze	Total
1	Canada	11	2	1	14
2	Finland	2	5	4	11
3	Sweden	2	4	2	8
4	Russia	1	1	5	7
5	Switzerland	0	2	4	6
6	Germany	0	2	0	2
Totals (6 entries)		16	16	16	48
