= Mika Pieniniemi =

Finnish ice hockey coach

- Born: April 26, 1966 (age 59); Oulu, Finland
- Occupation: Ice hockey coach
- Known for: Head Coach of KalPa (SM-liiga)

Mika Pieniniemi (born April 26, 1966) is a Finnish ice hockey coach. He was the head coach of KalPa during the 2005–06 and 2006–07 SM-liiga seasons.
