= 2022 CUFLA season =

- League: Canadian University Field Lacrosse Association
- Sport: Field lacrosse
- Duration: September 7, 2022 – October 23, 2022
- Games: 10
- Teams: 14

Regular Season
- Top seed: Guelph Gryphons, Trent Excalibur

Playoffs
- East champions: Brock Badgers
- East runners-up: Guelph Gryphons
- West champions: Trent Excalibur
- West runners-up: McGill Redbirds

Baggataway Cup finals
- Champions: Trent Excalibur
- Runners-up: Brock Badgers

CUFLA seasons
- 2021 season 2023 season

The 2022 CUFLA season was the 37th in the history of the Canadian University Field Lacrosse Association. The regular season took place from September 7 through October 23. The first round of playoffs were held on the weekend of October 28–30, and the league championship, the Baggataway Cup, was held at Trent University on the weekend of November 4–7.

== Regular season ==
West	GP	W	L	PTS	GF	GA
Guelph Gryphons - x	10	9	1	18	98	45
Western Mustangs - x	10	9	1	18	112	49
Brock Badgers - x	10	6	4	12	86	59
Toronto Varsity Blues - x	10	5	5	10	81	70
McMaster Marauders - x	10	4	6	8	61	68
Laurier Golden Hawks - x	10	2	8	4	54	83
Laurentian Voyageurs	10	0	10	0	20	138

East	GP	W	L	PTS	GF	GA
Trent Excalibur - x,y	10	9	1	18	116	55
Bishop's Gaiters - x	10	7	3	14	83	57
Queen's Golden Gaels - x	10	7	3	14	105	75
McGill Redbirds - x	10	6	4	12	101	68
Carleton Ravens - x	10	5	5	10	70	93
Nipissing Lakers	10	1	9	2	57	120
Ottawa Gee-Gees	10	0	10	0	53	117

== Playoff weekend ==
Winners of each first-round game advance to either quarter- or semi-finals, based on seed.

Game 1
McGill	14
Queen's	6

Game 2
McMaster	3
Western	15

Game 3
Toronto	5
Brock	8

Game 4
Carleton	6
Bishop's	7

Game 5
Laurier	4
Guelph	8

== Baggataway Cup ==
Quarterfinals
McGill	13
Western	9
Brock	8
Bishop's	7

Semifinals
Trent	12
McGill	5
Guelph	5
Brock	9

Finals
Trent	12
Brock	3
