= Diker =

Diker is a surname. Notable people with the surname include:

- Ayse Diker (born 1984), Turkish swimmer
- Dan Diker, American secretary general of the World Jewish Congress
- Tevfik Diker (born 1947), Turkish politician
