= Montreal Rowing Club =

- Location: Montreal, Quebec, Canada
- Home water: Notre Dame Island
- Founded: 1982
- Affiliations: Rowing Canada
- Website: www.avironmontreal.com

The Montreal Rowing Club (MRC) is a rowing club based in the city of Montreal, Quebec, Canada. Its French name is club d'aviron de Montréal (CAM). The club originally started in 1982 as an activity offered by le Club nautique et plein air de Montreal, a non-profit organization set up by the city. It was officially founded in 1987 as a separate entity with the mandate to promote the sport of rowing in the Montreal area. It is a registered club with Rowing Canada.

The MRC is one of the five rowing clubs in the Montreal area including the Club d'aviron Boucherville, the Club d'aviron de Lachine, the Club d'aviron de Laval and the Club d'aviron de Terrebonne.

== Facilities ==
The club rows out of the Olympic Basin located on Notre Dame Island using the same facilities built for the 1976 Summer Olympics. It shares these facilities with l'Association Québécoise d'aviron, the Quebec rowing association, and the McGill University Rowing Club (MURC). These facilities include:

- The 2000 metres-plus long basin itself, the only one of its kind in North America.
- The athletes' quarters which houses the indoor tank, one of only two in Canada and the only one that can accommodate eight rowers, the weight room and the ergometer room.
- Hangars used for storing rowing shells with one heated hangar used to do repairs.

The club operates year-round with on-water training taking place between April and early November. The on-water season starts as soon as the docks are installed and the water level in the basin is raised by the city. Due to the adjacent Circuit Gilles-Villeneuve access to the basin is limited the week leading up both the Formula One Canadian Grand Prix and until 2006, the Champ Car Grand Prix of Montreal, and since 2007 NASCAR.

The Montreal Rowing Club shares facilities and equipment with many local Cegep and University rowing teams including, Dawson College, Marianopolis College, University of Montreal, and Brebeuf College. McGill University remains only partially affiliated with the organization.

== Membership ==
The club offers membership programs for all rowers of all skill levels. These programs include novice (first year), junior (U19), under 23 (u23), masters (27 years-plus), recreational and competitive. The club also offers learn to row (LTR) courses for those wanting to start in the sport. Additionally the club runs many high school rowing programs for such schools as Selwyn House School and The Study. On a number of occasions the club has been a host site for Dynamic Opportunities for Youth (DOY). It has also and established corporate rowing program which ends with a regatta.

== Regattas ==
The club has also been host club for a number of national and international rowing events including the 2003 and 2012 Canadian Masters Championships and the rowing element of the 2006 World Outgames.
