= St. Bonaventure Bonnies men's lacrosse =

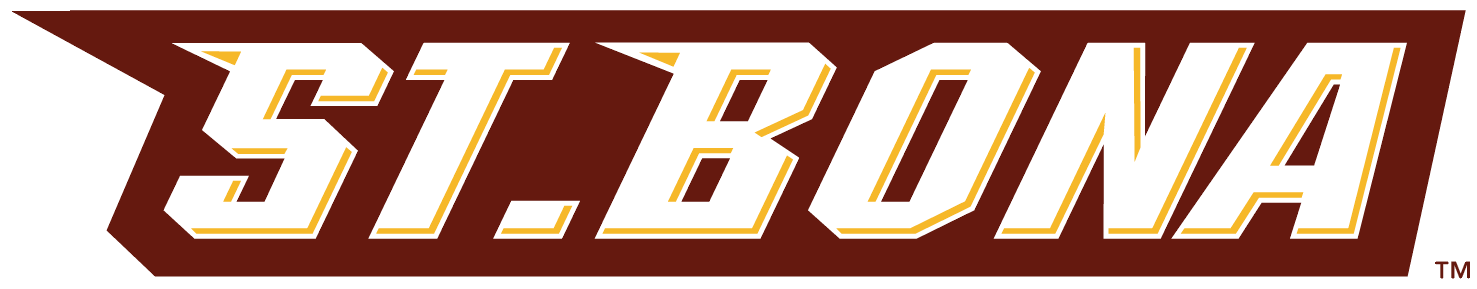
- Founded: 1980; 46 years ago
- University: St. Bonaventure University
- Head coach: Brendan Storrier
- Stadium: Marra Athletics Fields Complex
- Conference: A-10
- Nickname: Bonnies
- Colors: Brown and white

Conference regular season championships
- 2022

The St. Bonaventure Bonnies men's lacrosse team represents St. Bonaventure University in St. Bonaventure, New York. The Bonnies are led by head coach Brendan Storrier. St. Bonaventure plays their home games at Marra Athletics Fields Complex. The Bonnies currently compete as a member of the Atlantic 10 conference.

== History ==
The St. Bonaventure men's lacrosse program began as a club sport from 1980 to 1988.

In 1989, the program became a varsity sport and moved to the NCAA Division III level. While in Division III, the team was coached by Mark Ward (1989) and Rick Moore (1990-1993). After the 1993 season, the Bonnies moved back to the club sport level. As a Division III program, the team’s most wins came in 1991, finishing with a 6-8 record.

In March 2017, it was announced that St. Bonaventure would once again be a varsity sport and would be moving to NCAA Division I. The Bonnies joined the Metro Atlantic Athletic Conference (MAAC) for the 2019 season and later moved to the Atlantic 10 Conference for the 2023 season.

In 2021, St. Bonaventure appeared in their first-ever MAAC tournament and made it to the MAAC Semifinals in 2021, before losing to Monmouth 12-5. The Bonnies defeated Detroit Mercy 11-8 in the MAAC quarterfinals.

In 2022, the Bonnies achieved their best season in program history in their final season in the MAAC. The team finished 11-4 overall and 5-1 in conference, winning the 2022 MAAC regular season title. However, St. Bonaventure would lose to Manhattan 8-7 in the MAAC tournament title game, failing to capture the conference title and NCAA tournament autobid.

On April 28, 2025, St. Bonaventure announced that head coach Randy Mearns would not be returning as head coach of the men's lacrosse team. Mearns had led the program since its return as a varsity sport in 2017 and had a 24-62 record in seven seasons. On June 25, 2025, the Bonnies announced that Brendan Storrier would be the team's new head coach.
