= Bob Beretta =

Current position
- Title: Athletic director
- Team: St. Bonaventure
- Conference: A-10

Playing career
- 1984–1987: St. Bonaventure
- Position: Pitcher

Coaching career (HC unless noted)
- 2019: Army (interim HC)

Administrative career (AD unless noted)
- 1987–2021: Army (senior associate AD)
- 2021–2024: Le Moyne
- 2024–present: St. Bonaventure

Head coaching record
- Overall: 26–30

Bob Beretta is the current director of athletics for St. Bonaventure University. Beretta attended college at St. Bonaventure University, where he pitched on the St. Bonaventure Bonnies baseball team from 1984 to 1987. Beretta served as a senior associate athletic director at the United States Military Academy from 1987 to 2021 and as athletic director at Le Moyne College from 2021 to 2024. He also served as interim head softball coach for the Army Black Knights softball team for the 2019 NCAA Division I softball season, compiling a 26–30 record. Beretta was named athletic director at St. Bonaventure University on June 4, 2024.

== Head coaching record ==
Record table
Season	Team	Overall	Conference	Standing	Postseason
Army Black Knights (Patriot League) (2019)
2019	Army	26–30	8–10	T–4th	
Army:		{{{overall}}}	8–10		
Total:		26–30			
