= McGill Redbirds and Martlets =

Athletic teams at McGill University, Canada

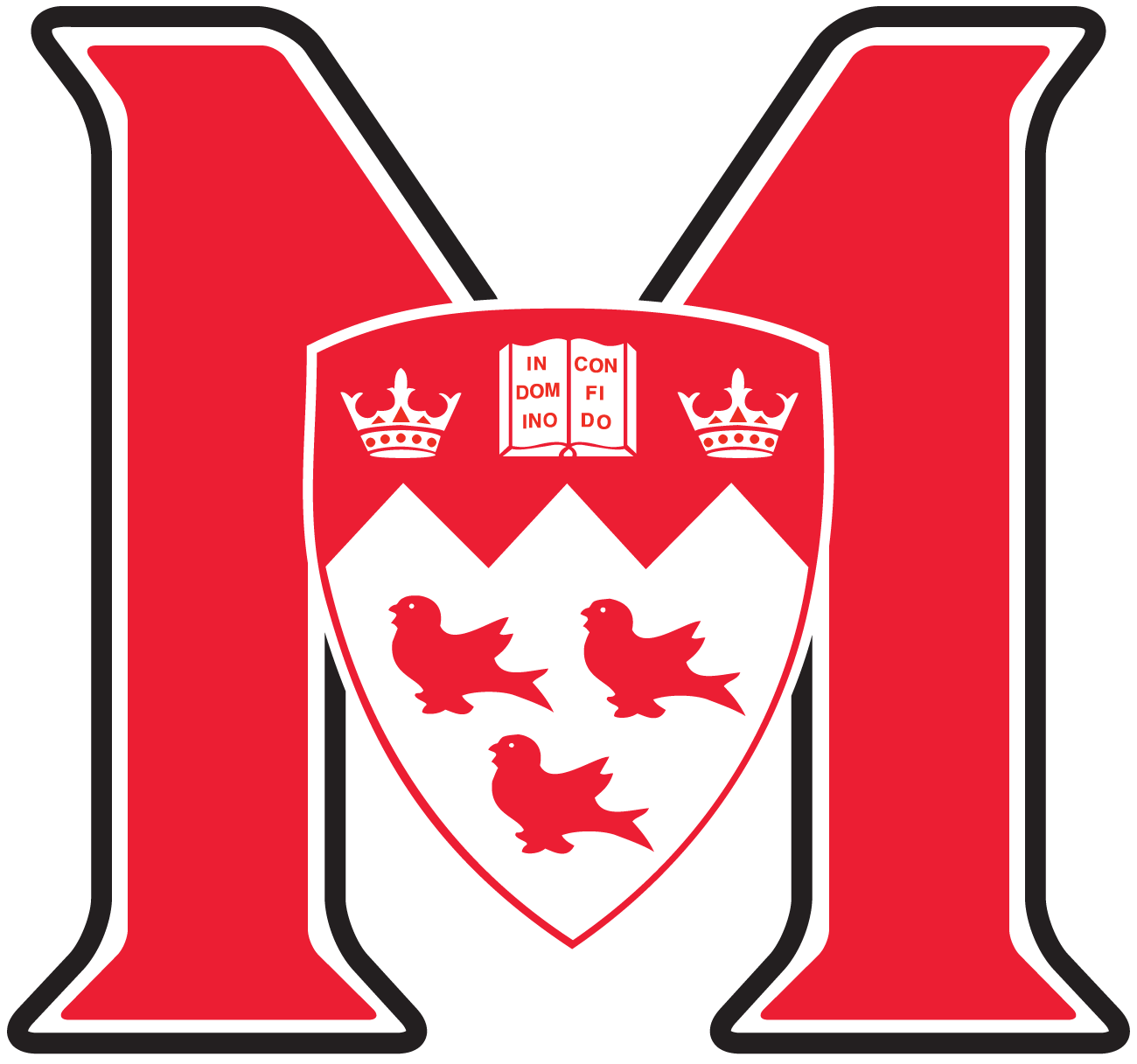
- University: McGill University
- Nickname: Redbirds (men); Redmen (men, former); Martlets (women)
- Association: U Sports
- Conference: Réseau du sport étudiant du Québec
- Location: Montreal, Quebec
- Varsity teams: 26 (13 men's, 13 women's)
- Football stadium: Percival Molson Stadium
- Basketball arena: Love Competition Hall
- Ice hockey arena: McConnell Arena
- Baseball stadium: Parc Trudeau
- Aquatics center: Memorial Pool
- Outdoor track and field venue: Percival Molson Stadium
- Volleyball arena: Love Competition Hall
- Field hockey venue: Percival Molson Stadium
- Rugby venue: Percival Molson Stadium
- Colors: Red, white, and black
- Mascot: Marty the Martlet
- Website: mcgillathletics.ca
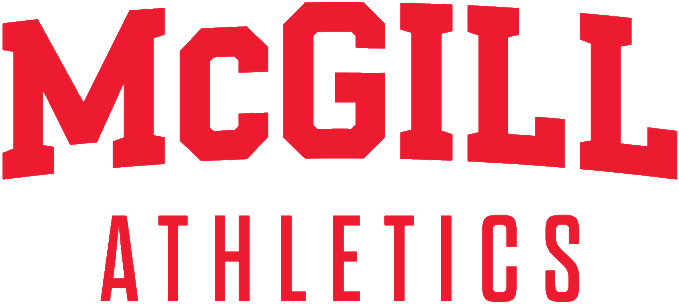

The McGill Redbirds (formerly the McGill Redmen) and McGill Martlets are the varsity athletic teams that represent McGill University in Montreal, Quebec, Canada. The Redbirds refer to the men's teams and the Martlets refer to the women's teams.

== History ==
In 1868, the first recorded game of rugby in North America occurred in Montreal, between British army officers and McGill students, giving McGill the oldest University-affiliated rugby club in North America. Other McGill-originated sports evolved out of rugby rules: football, hockey, and basketball. The first game of North American football was played between McGill and Harvard on May 14, 1874, leading to the spread of American football throughout the Ivy League.

On March 3, 1875, the first organized indoor hockey game was played at Montreal's Victoria Skating Rink between two nine-player teams, including James Creighton and several McGill University students. The McGill University Hockey Club, the first organized hockey club, was founded in 1877 and played its first game on January 31, 1877. Very soon thereafter, those McGill students wrote the first hockey rule book. A McGill team was one of four that competed in the Amateur Hockey Association of Canada, founded in 1886. AHAC teams competed for the first Stanley Cup in 1893; the AHAC became one of predecessor organizations of the National Hockey League. McGill alumnus James Naismith invented basketball in early December 1891.

There has been a McGill alumnus or alumna competing at every Olympic Games since 1908. Swimmer George Hodgson won two gold medals at the 1912 Summer Olympics, ice hockey goaltender Kim St-Pierre won gold medals at the 2002 Winter Olympics and at the 2006 Winter Olympics. Other 2006 gold medalists are Jennifer Heil (women's freestyle mogul) and goaltender Charline Labonté (women's ice hockey).

A 2005 hazing scandal forced the cancellation of the final two games in the McGill Redmen football season.

In 2006, McGill's Senate approved a proposed anti-hazing policy to define forbidden initiation practices.

In 2018, after a slew of protests—both online and on-campus—an online vote revealed that 78.8 per cent of the McGill student population were in favour of changing the varsity teams' "Redmen" name, with 21 per cent against. The university's nickname emerged in the 1920s. In the 1950s, both men's and women's teams came to be nicknamed the "Indians" and "Squaws", and some teams later adopted a logo of an indigenous man wearing a headdress in the 1980s and '90s. In December 2018, McGill University released a working group report that revealed deep divisions between students and alumni who defend the nearly century-old name and those who feel it is derogatory to indigenous students. In January 2019, it was announced that the principal Suzanne Fortier would decide whether or not to change the name by the end of the 2019 academic term.

In 2019, an announcement confirmed that the Redmen name for its men's varsity sports teams had been dropped. No new name was planned; the groups would be known as the McGill teams. However, in 2020 McGill University revealed that the varsity men's sports teams would be known as the "Redbirds". The name carries historical links to several McGill sports clubs, teams, and events. The former name would remain in the McGill Sports Hall of Fame and on items such as existing plaques, trophies and championship photos.

In 2025, the University announced it would be cutting 25 sports for the 2026/27 season. The sports that are planning to be cut include:

- Men's volleyball
- Men's baseball
- Women's field lacrosse
- Women's field hockey
- Women's rugby
- Badminton
- Fencing
- Figure skating
- Golf
- Logger sports
- Nordic ski
- Sailing
- Squash
- Tennis
- Track and field

The announcement caused uproar among the teams who's sport would be cut, and many began negotiations to try and reverse the decision, as well as creating fundraisers.

McGill historic teams and athletes

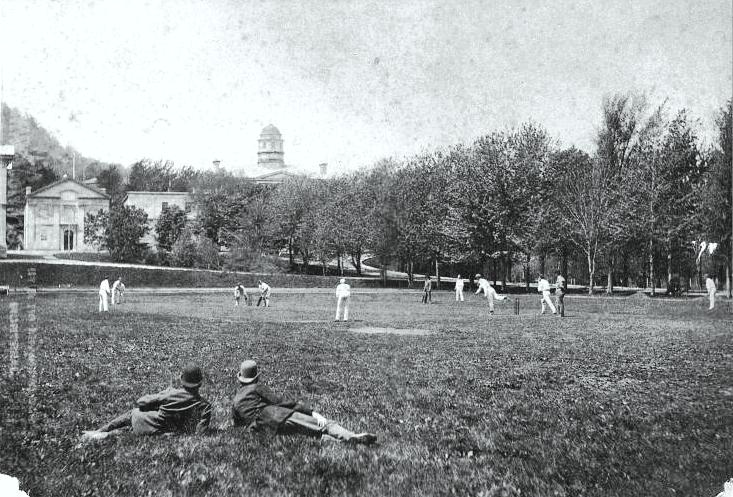
Cricket game in 1890

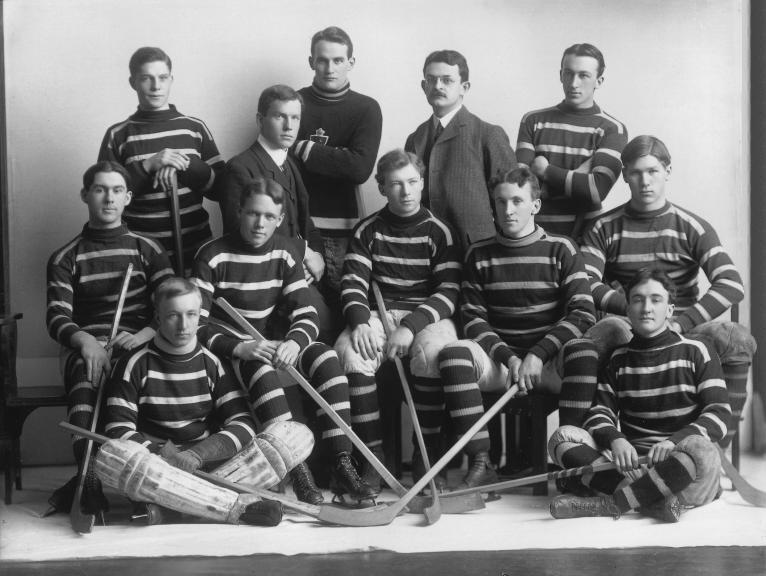
Ice hockey team, 1904

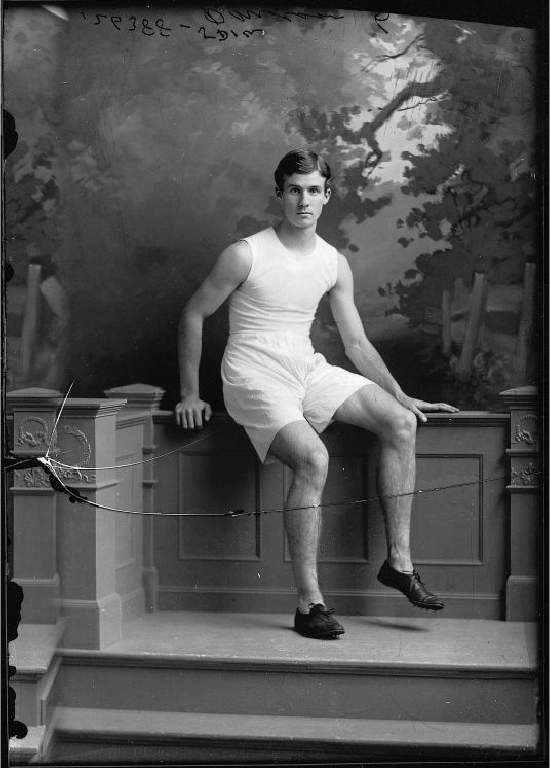
Percival Molson

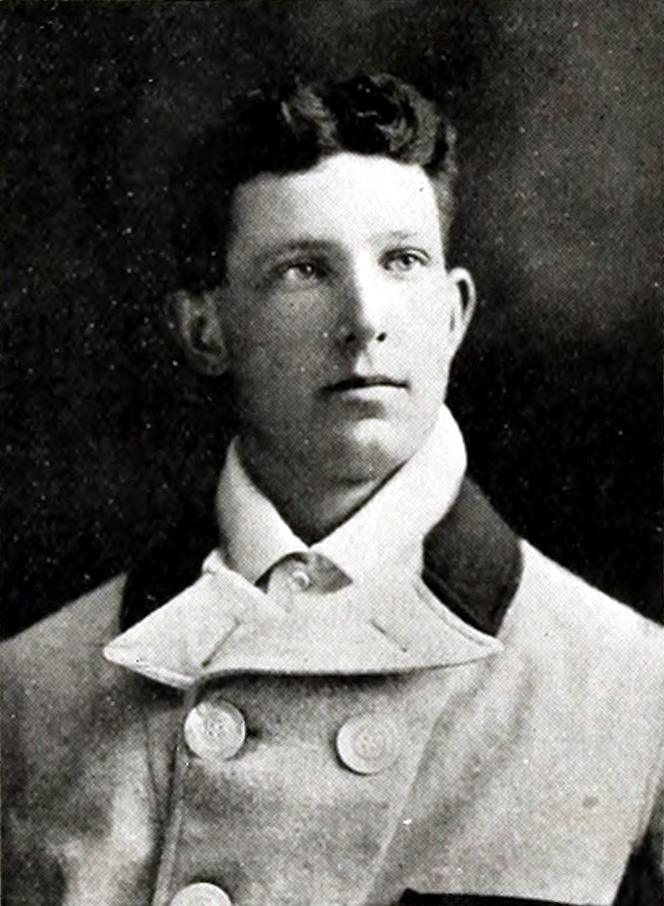
Frank Shaughnessy (baseball)

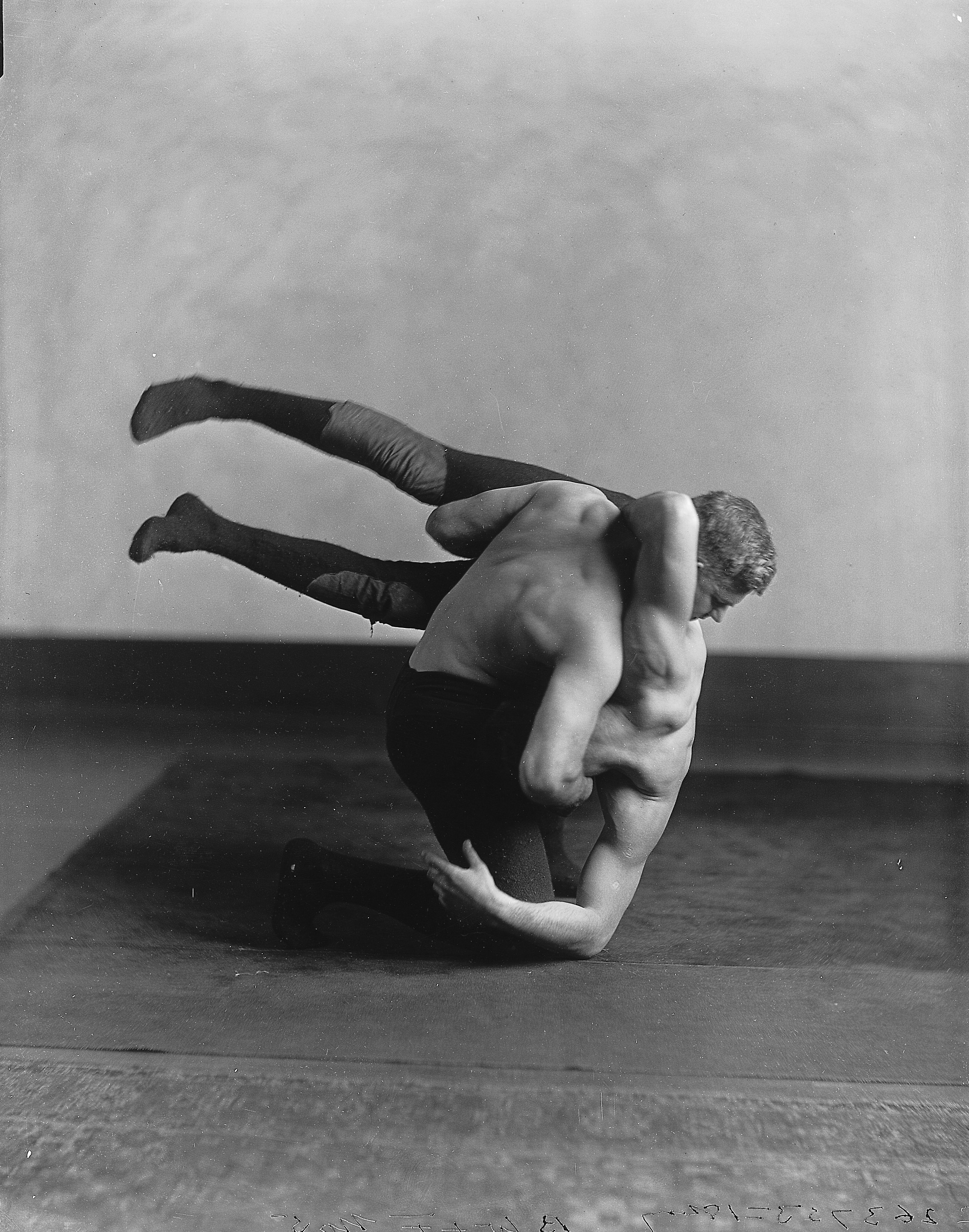
Wrestling at McGill, 1925

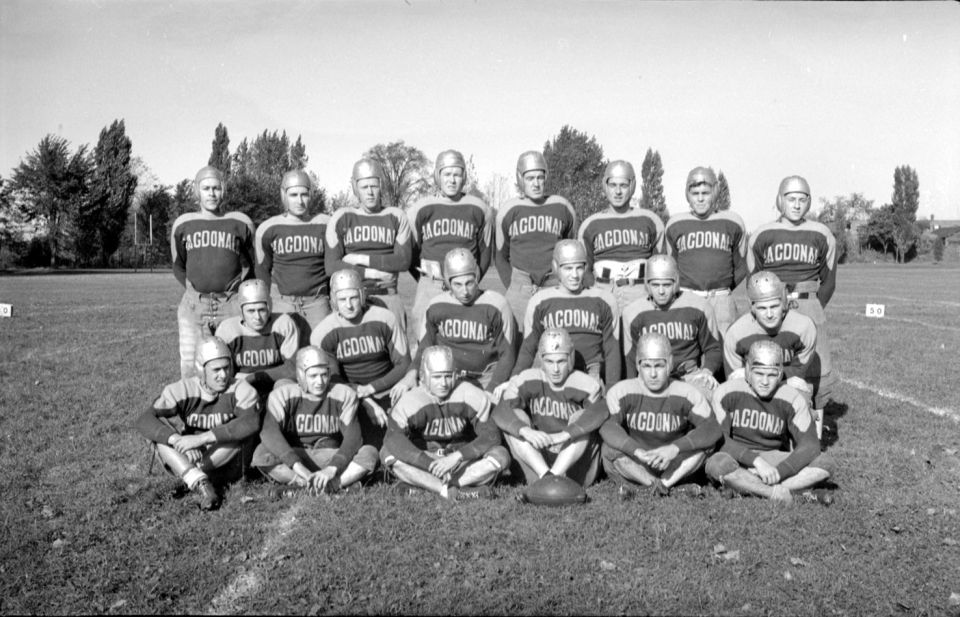
Football team in 1937

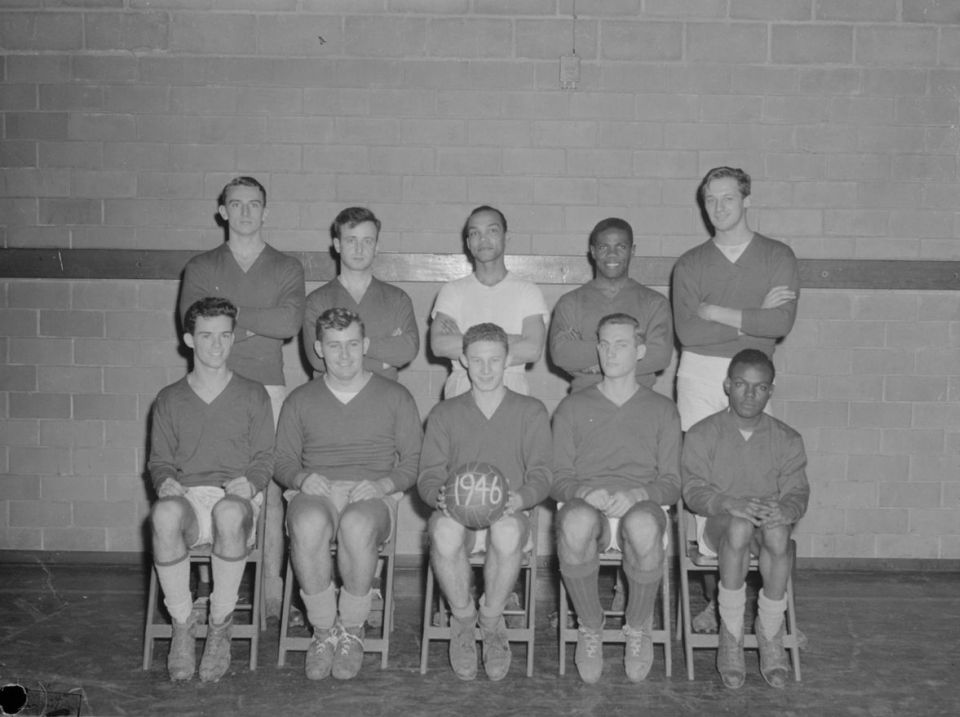
Volleyball team of 1946

== Varsity teams ==
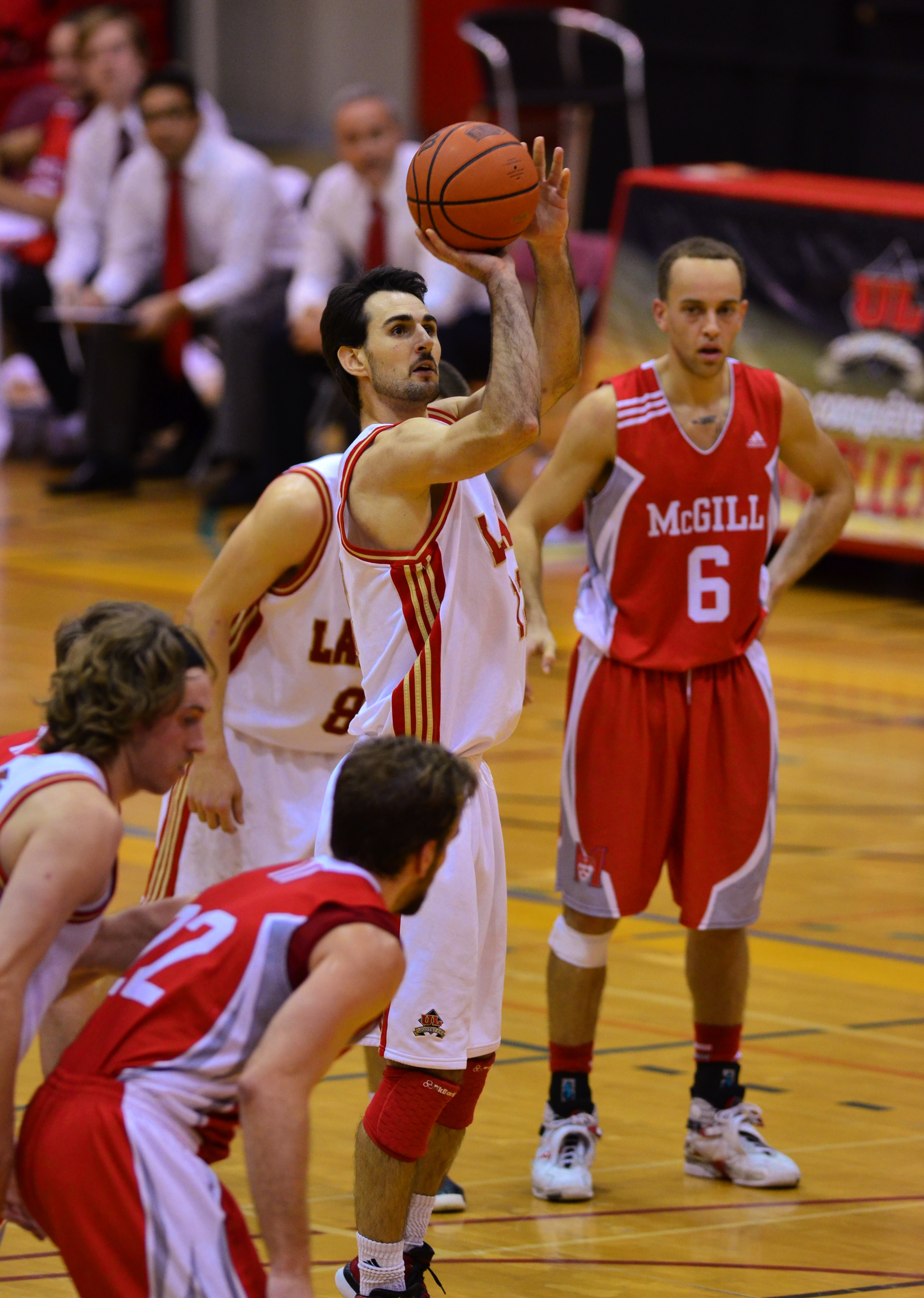
McGill (red kits) v Laval game, 2012

Men's sports	Women's sports
Badminton	Artistic swimming
Baseball	Badminton
Basketball	Basketball
Cross country	Cross country
Football	Field hockey
Golf	Golf
Ice hockey	Ice hockey
Lacrosse	Rugby
Rugby	Rowing
Rowing	Soccer
Soccer	Swimming
Swimming	Volleyball
Track and field	Track and field

=== Football ===
The McGill U Sports football Redbirds is one of the oldest in all of Canada, having begun organized competition in 1874. The team has appeared in three Vanier Cup national championships, in 1969, 1973 and 1987, with the team finally winning the title in the 1987 game. McGill plays out of Percival Molson Memorial Stadium, where the Canadian Football League's Montreal Alouettes also play.

After their 2005 suspension, the team struggled with three losing seasons, including two winless seasons in 2007 and 2008. The program showed signs of hope as the team won three games in 2009, but soon sank back down to futility with consecutive winless campaigns in 2010 and 2011.

=== Ice hockey ===
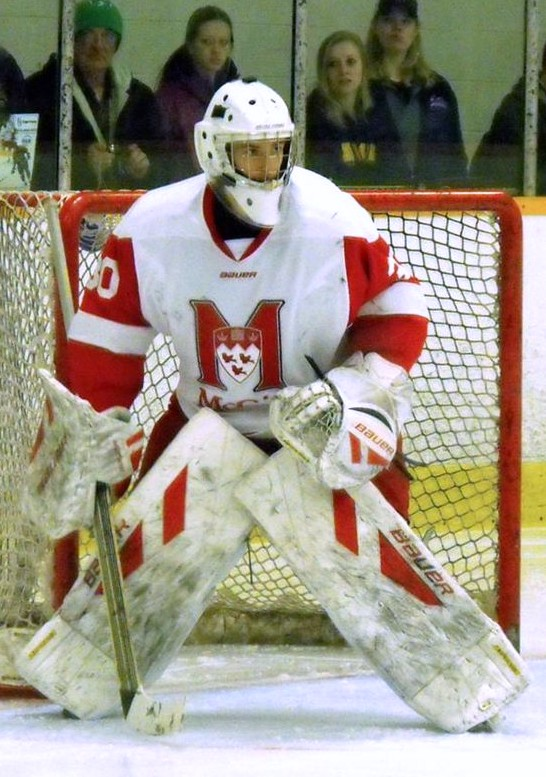
McGill goalie during 2014 Queen's Cup

On March 3, 1875 the first organized indoor game was played at Montreal's Victoria Skating Rink by James George Aylwin Creighton and several McGill University students. In 1877, several McGill students, including Creighton, Henry Joseph, Richard F. Smith, W.F. Robertson, and W.L. Murray codified seven ice hockey rules. The McGill University Hockey Club – later re-christened "The Redmen" – was founded in 1877, arguably making the McGill men's hockey team the first and oldest ice hockey club in the world.

The university operates both men's and women's teams in U Sports. The teams play at McGill's McConnell Arena. The men's team has won championships in 1883, 1903, 1905, 1912, 1918, 1921, 1930, 1931, 1933, 1934, 1935, 1936, 1937, 1938, 1939, 1946, 2006, 2008, 2009, 2010, 2011 and 2012, including the 2012 CIS University Cup national championship. The women's team has won championships in 1985, 2003, 2006, 2007, 2008, 2009 and 2010.

On November 15, 2003, Kim St-Pierre was the first woman in U Sports history to be credited with a win in a men's regular season game. This occurred when McGill defeated the Ryerson Rams by a score of 5–2.

=== Lacrosse ===
Lacrosse was played to a limited extent at McGill as early as 1873. The 15-man McGill Lacrosse Club of 1898 was led by F. L. Thompson (President), R. H. Craig (Vice President), and A. J. Grant (Secretary Treasurer). Numerous American clubs, including Brooklyn, Staten Island, Yale, and Harvard, challenged that McGill Lacrosse Club, but it was impossible to accept on account of approaching exams.

McGill's lacrosse tradition was not re-established until 2001, when a McGill freshman organized a student lacrosse club. In 2002 the team gained Level-3 varsity club status at McGill, and joined the Canadian University Field Lacrosse Association, Canada's premier league founded in 1985. In 2007 the team's status was elevated to a Level-2 varsity team by McGill Athletics. McGill has twice won Canada's national championship, the Baggataway Cup, in 2012 and 2015. McGill competes in the CUFLA East versus Bishop's, Carleton, Nipissing, Ottawa, Trent and Queen's Universities.

Four-time recipient of the Harry Griffith's Award in 2007, 2008, 2012 and 2015, the team has won eight CUFLA East conference titles in 2007, 2011, 2012, 2013, 2014, 2015, 2016 and 2017. The team has achieved a record of 97–11–1 since 2011 versus Canadian opponents. The hybrid Canadian-box-American-field lacrosse program is geographically diverse with student-athletes recruited from across Canada and the US. The team plays home games in McGill's Percival Molson Memorial Stadium.

=== Soccer ===
The soccer program at McGill operates for a big part of the school year. On top of the regular U Sports fall season there is a Quebec indoor season, which runs from January to mid March. Preparation for the U Sports season starts with try-outs in mid-August and several preseason games against NCAA teams.

=== Sailing ===
McGill's sailing program was founded in 1937, and the first regattas took place in Kingston. McGill's first win came in the 1938 Canadian Intercollegiate Dinghy Racing Association National Championships. Today, the team competes in the New England Intercollegiate Sailing Association, which itself is a part of the Intercollegiate Sailing Association and in the Canadian Intercollegiate Sailing Association. The team trains out of the Royal St. Lawrence Yacht Club throughout the fall and competes in dinghies such as the collegiate 420 and the Flying Junior.

=== Baseball ===
In 1994, the McGill Redbirds (they played under the Redbird name at the start of the program) were one of the four founding members of the Canadian Intercollegiate Baseball Association (CIBA) along with Durham College, The University of Guelph and McMaster University. The first two CIBA championships were played in Montreal with the Redbirds winning the inaugural championship. The baseball team presently plays in the Canadian Collegiate Baseball Association (CCBA). They have won a total of eight national championships (1994, 2006 and 2010 under the old CIBA banner and 2014, 2015, 2016, 2017, and 2018 under the new CCBA banner), and have appeared in four national finals (1995, 2003, 2005 and 2008). In the 2016 CCBA National Tournament, held at Ahuntsic Park in Montreal, the Redmen went 2–1 in pool play, advancing to the semi-finals where they defeated the Saint Mary's Huskies by a score of 21–0, and then defeated the Montreal Carabins in the national championship game 3–2 on a walk-off home run by catcher Christopher Stanford. This victory marked a three-peat for the Redmen as Canadian National Champions, a streak which has now been extended to five straight national championships. The team plays on Gary Carter Field out of Trudeau Park in Côte-Saint-Luc. In 2025, it was announced that the baseball team would be one the teams cut at the end of the season.

==== Head coaches ====
Name	Tenure
John Elias	1994–1995
Ernie D'Alessandro	1996–2011
Jason Starr	2012–2018
Casey Auerbach	2019–2022
Chris Haddad	2023–present

== Facilities ==
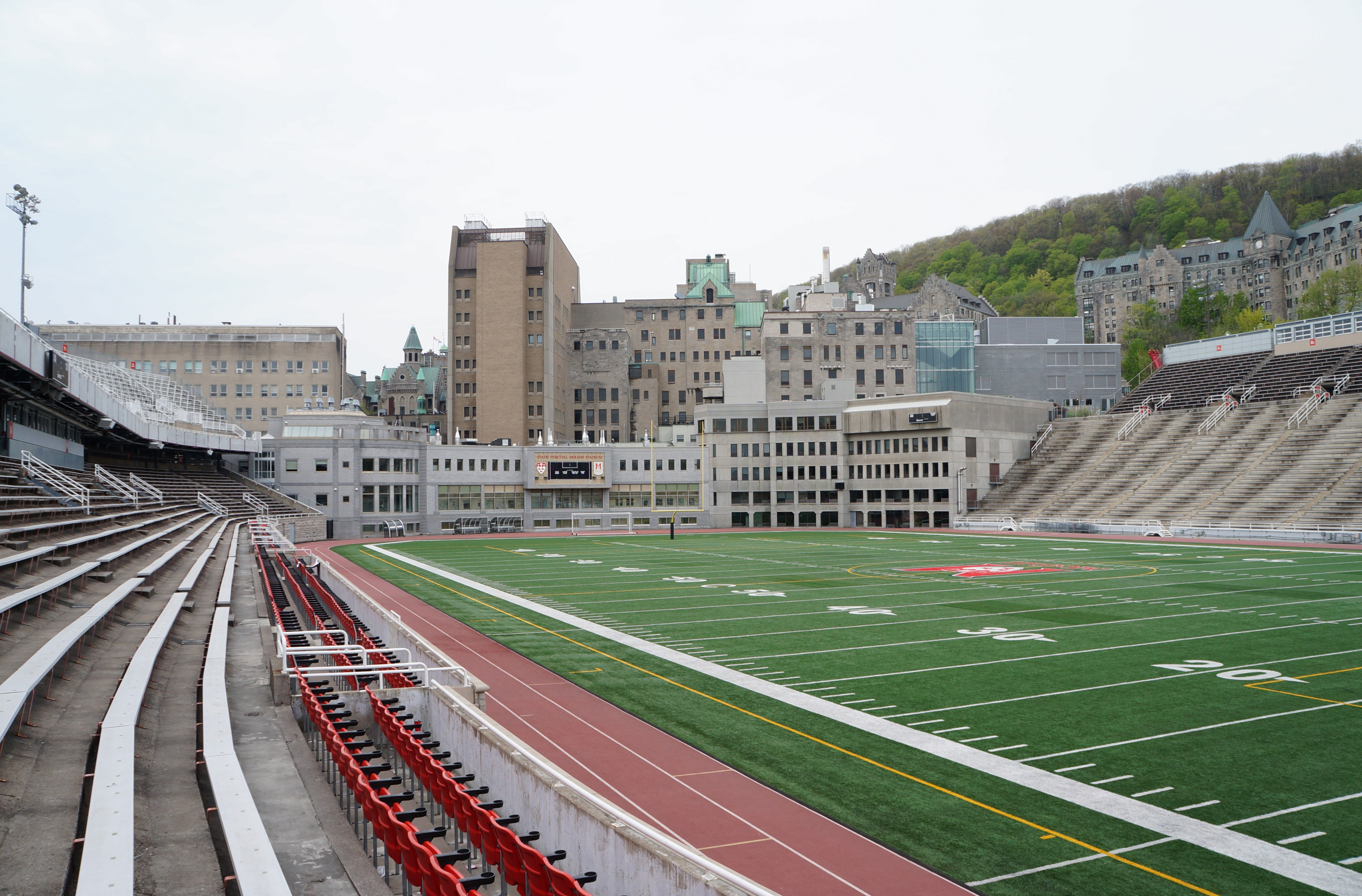
Percival Molson Stadium

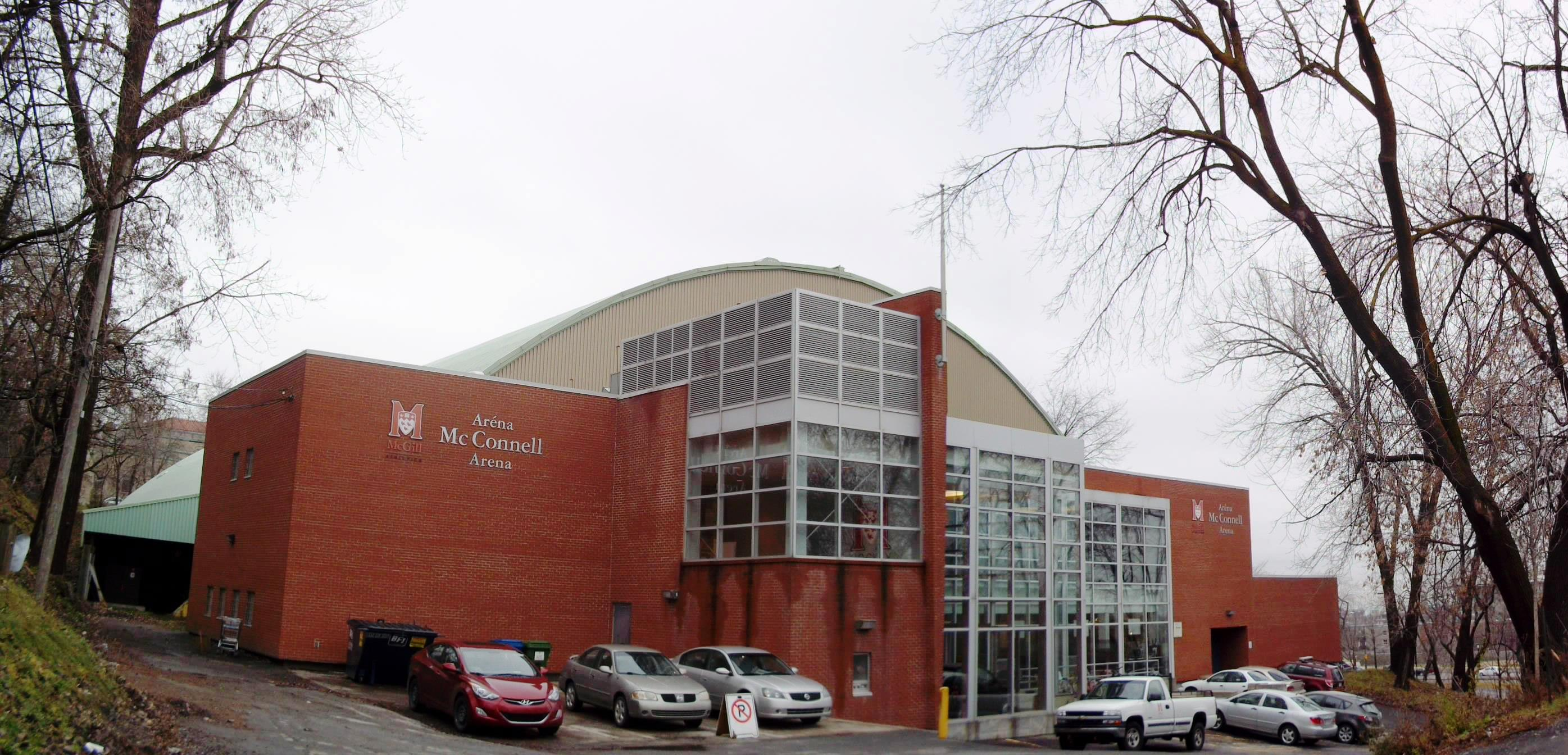
McConnell Arena

Venue	Sport(s)	Ref.
Percival Molson Stadium	Football; Field hockey Rugby; Track and field	
McConnell Arena	Ice hockey	
Love Competition Hall	Basketball; Volleyball	

== Team image ==
=== Name ===
According to Suzanne Morton, a professor of history at McGill, the name "McGill Redmen" was first adopted in 1927, initially intended to reflect James McGill's Scottish heritage and hair color. Despite this, after the hiring of a new football coach from the United States sometime before 1940, Indigenous imagery was brought in to accompany the name as a show of spectacle. Men's teams became colloquially known as the "Indians" and from 1961 to 1967 women's teams were formally known as the "Super Squaws".

1950s McGill team logos featured Aboriginal Canadian iconography and reports by news sources in the 1950s refer to the "McGill Indians" in their sports reporting. Stereotyped Indigenous iconography was on McGill football and hockey team jerseys and helmets until 1992 when a student-led campaign against the name and imagery led to their removal. At the same time, a large crest depicting an Indigenous man wearing a headdress was removed from the McGill gym.

A second student-led campaign, #ChangeTheName, was organized in 2017 by the McGill Student Union Indigenous Affairs committee. In a 2018 referendum organized by McGill's student union, 78.8% of 5,856 participating students voted in favour of changing the teams' name.

On April 12, 2019, McGill announced that "McGill University's men's varsity teams will cease to be called the Redmen." On November 17, 2020, "Redbirds" was announced as the new name for the McGill men's varsity teams.

=== Mascot ===
Since 2005, the mascot for both the men's and women's varsity teams has been Marty the Martlet. The mascot made its first appearance at the 2005 Homecoming men's football game, where it was presented to the McGill Athletics Department by the Student Organization for Alumni Relations.

== Rivalries ==
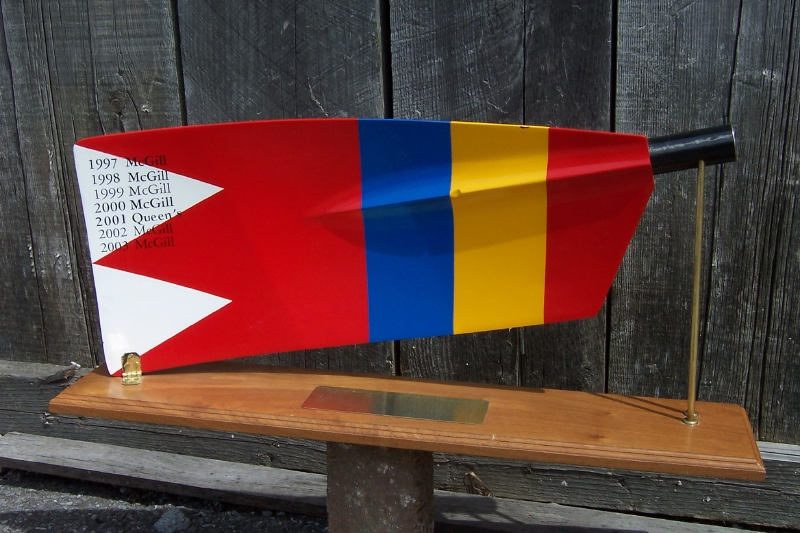
The Queen's-McGill Challenge Blade

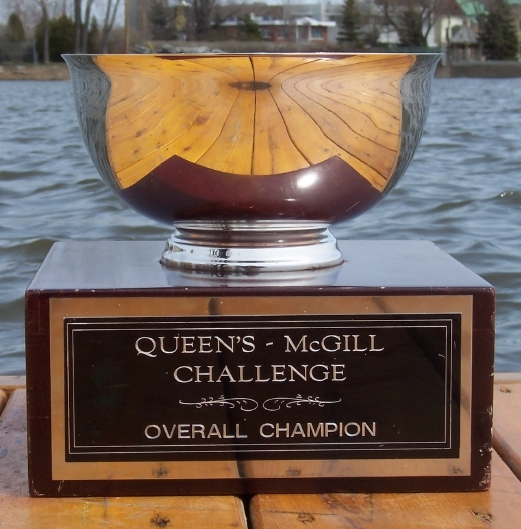
The Lorne Gales Trophy

McGill maintains an academic and athletic rivalry with Queen's University in Kingston, Ontario. Competition between rowing athletes at the two schools has inspired an annual boat race between the two universities in the spring of each year since 1997, inspired by the famous Oxford-Cambridge Boat Race. The football rivalry, which started in 1884, ended after Canadian University athletic divisions were re-organized in 2000; the Ontario-Quebec Intercollegiate Football Conference was divided into Ontario University Athletics and Quebec Student Sports Federation. The rivalry returned in 2002 when it transferred to the annual home-and-home hockey games between the two institutions. Queen's students refer to these matches as "Kill McGill" games, and usually show up in Montreal in atypically large numbers to cheer on the Queen's Golden Gaels hockey team. In 2007, McGill students arrived in bus-loads to cheer on the McGill Redmen, occupying a third of Queen's Jock Harty Arena.

The school also competes in the annual "Old Four (IV)" soccer tournament, with Queen's University, the University of Toronto and the University of Western Ontario.

McGill and Harvard are also athletic rivals, as demonstrated by the biennial Harvard-McGill rugby games, alternately played in Montreal and Cambridge.

== Controversy ==
=== 2005 hazing scandal ===
A 2005 hazing scandal forced the cancellation of the final two games in the McGill Redbirds football season. An investigation into the incident showed that "the event did involve nudity, degrading positions and behaviours, gagging, touching in inappropriate manners with a broomstick, as well as verbal and physical intimidation of rookies by a large portion of the team." In 2006, McGill's Senate approved a proposed anti-hazing policy to define forbidden initiation practices.

== Pep band ==
The "McGill Fight Band" (also known simply as 'Fight Band'), is the teams' pep band. The band performs and cheers at one or more athletic events each week. In fall semesters, these include rugby, soccer and Redbirds football games. In winter semesters, these include basketball, Martlets volleyball and Martlets hockey games. Fight Band performs at every McGill Redbirds hockey home game at McConnell Arena in both semesters.

== See also ==
- Indigenous team name controversy
- U Sports
