= McGill Men's Lacrosse =

Men's varsity sports team at McGill University in Montreal, Quebec, Canada

McGill Redmen Lacrosse
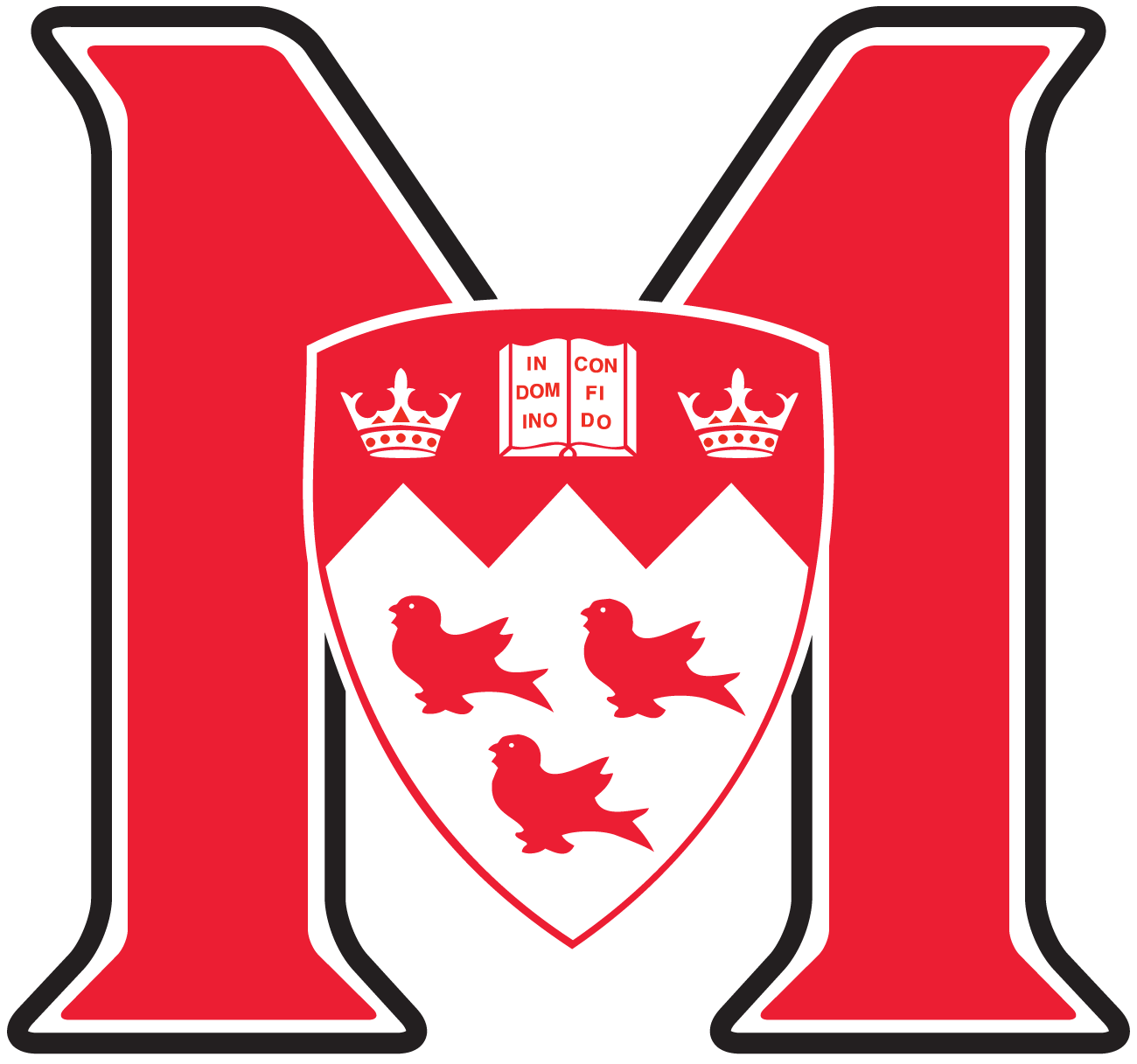
- Sport: Field lacrosse
- Based in: Montreal
- Location: Canada
- Head coach: Tim Murdoch
- Championships: (2012, 2015)
- Website: McGill Men's Lacrosse

The McGill Men's Lacrosse team is a men's varsity sports team at McGill University in Montreal, Quebec, Canada. Originally the McGill Redmen, the name was temporarily changed in May 2019 after nearly 80% of students voted to change the name in a 2018 referendum held by McGill's student union.

As of 2003, the team was being coached by Tim Murdoch, a former NCAA Div-I lacrosse player at Princeton University. Murdoch was named as CUFLA's 'Coaching Staff of the Year' in 2008.
