= St. Bonaventure Bonnies =

Intercollegiate sports teams of St. Bonaventure University

- University: St. Bonaventure University
- Conference: Atlantic 10 Conference
- NCAA: Division I
- Athletic director: Bob Beretta
- Location: St. Bonaventure, New York
- Varsity teams: 19
- Basketball arena: Reilly Center
- Baseball stadium: Fred Handler Park at McGraw-Jennings Field
- Soccer stadium: Tom and Michelle Marra Athletics Field Complex
- Lacrosse stadium: Tom and Michelle Marra Athletics Field Complex
- Mascot: Reilly the Bona Wolf
- Nickname: Bonnies
- Fight song: "Unfurl the Brown and White"
- Colors: Brown and white
- Website: gobonnies.com
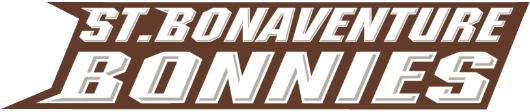

The St. Bonaventure Bonnies (formerly the St. Bonaventure Brown Indians from 1927 to 1992) are the varsity intercollegiate athletic programs of St. Bonaventure University, based in St. Bonaventure, New York between the two towns of Allegany and Olean. The Bonnies compete in the National Collegiate Athletic Association's Division I Atlantic 10 Conference, of which it has been a member since 1979. The programs' mascot is the Bona Wolf and the colors are brown and white.

They have collectively won 13 team conference championships, as well as numerous individual conference titles and accolades.

== Sports sponsored ==
Men's sports	Women's sports
Baseball	Basketball
Basketball	Cross country
Cross country	Lacrosse
Golf	Soccer
Lacrosse	Softball
Soccer	Swimming and diving
Swimming and diving	Tennis
Tennis	Track and field^{†}
Track and field^{†}	Women's Rugby
† – Track and field includes both indoor and outdoor

A member of the Atlantic 10 Conference (A-10), St. Bonaventure University sponsors teams in nine men's and eight women's NCAA sanctioned sports. The Bonnies men's lacrosse program competed as an associate member of the Metro Atlantic Athletic Conference through the 2022 season, after which the A-10 established a men's lacrosse league.

=== Baseball ===
The Bonnies were coached by Larry Sudbrook for 35 seasons. The team captured Atlantic 10 division championships in 2000 and 2002. The 2004 squad won the Atlantic 10 championship and made its first appearance in the NCAA tournament. They are currently coached by Jason Rathbun.

=== Men's basketball ===
The men's basketball program has enjoyed success on and off throughout its history, including an NCAA Final Four appearance in 1970, and an NIT Championship in 1977. St. Bonaventure's most recent NCAA tournament appearance was in 2021, where it lost in the first Round to LSU. Its most recent victory was in the 2018 Tournament where the Bonnies won their play-in game against UCLA. The win marked the program's first NCAA tournament win since reaching the Elite Eight in 1970. The Bonnies would drop their next game, a 77–62 loss to Florida. Currently, St. Bonaventure's head men's basketball coach is Mark Schmidt. St. Bonaventure won the Atlantic 10 regular season and tournament championships in 2021.

NBA Hall of Famer Bob Lanier played at St. Bonaventure, leading them to the 1970 Final Four. The men's and women's basketball teams play at the 4,860-seat Reilly Center. The playing surface was renamed Bob Lanier Court in a dedication ceremony on October 12, 2007. Lanier attended along with his mother, sister, and daughter.

Men's basketball statistics
NCAA tournament appearances	1961, 1968, 1970, 1978, 2000, 2012, 2018, 2021
National Invitation tournament appearances	1951, 1952, 1957, 1958, 1959, 1960, 1964, 1971, 1977, 1979, 1983, 1995, 1998, 2001, 2002, 2016, 2022
NIT championships	1977
Atlantic 10 championships	2012, 2021
Atlantic 10 Regular season championships	2016, 2021

=== Women's basketball ===
In the 2011–2012 season, the Bonnies women's basketball team had the best season in their history. They accumulated a record of 31–4 in the regular season, including a perfect 14–0 record in the Atlantic 10 conference. They were ranked as high as 16th in the national polls and earned a 5th seed in the NCAA tournament. They beat Florida Gulf Coast and Marist in the Tallahassee Regional to advance to the Sweet 16, where they lost to eventual national runner-up Notre Dame. The women's basketball team made its second NCAA tournament appearance in 2016. The program's head coach is Jim Crowley, one of the winningest coaches in Atlantic 10 history.

Men's basketball statistics
NCAA tournament appearances	2012, 2016
National Invitation tournament appearances	2009, 2010, 2011, 2014
Atlantic 10 Regular season championships	2012

=== Men's lacrosse ===
In 2017, St. Bonaventure announced plans to add men's lacrosse as a varsity team, beginning in the 2018–2019 academic year. In the program's fourth varsity season, it captured the 2022 MAAC regular season championship. The Bonnies are coached by Canadian Lacrosse Hall of Fame inductee Randy Mearns. Goalie Brett Dobson, who won back-to-back PLL Championship Game MVP honors with the Utah Archers in 2023 and 2024, was an All-American with the Bonnies. Zack Belter was selected by the Buffalo Bandits 19th overall in the 2022 National Lacrosse League Entry Draft. Belter also saw success winning the Can-Am Senior B Lacrosse League with the Tuscarora Tomahawks in 2023.

== Former sports ==
=== Football ===
St. Bonaventure fielded an American football team sporadically from 1892 to 1970. The program gained national recognition in the post-World War II era under Coach Hugh Devore, a former All-American player at Notre Dame. The Brown Indians compiled a record of 25-9-1 during his tenure, which ended after the 1949 season (http://archives.sbu.edu/football/the_history.htm).

=== Wrestling ===
The Brown Indians had a wrestling team in 1927, led by player-coach Ed George, and again in 1954, coached by Mike Green. They were winless each season, going 0–2 in 1927 and 0–1 in 1954. Due to their lopsided loss to Alfred Ag Tech in 1954, they discontinued the sport.

=== Ice Hockey ===
While currently a club team, St. Bonaventure had a Division III from 1982 through 1993. The Brown Indians had success as an independent recording four consecutive winning seasons before joining the ECAC West in 1986. After a 19–11 mark the program declined and finished near the bottom of the conference for six years before the program dropped from Division III to club status.

== Colors and mascot ==
Atlantic 10 Conference logo in St. Bonaventure colors

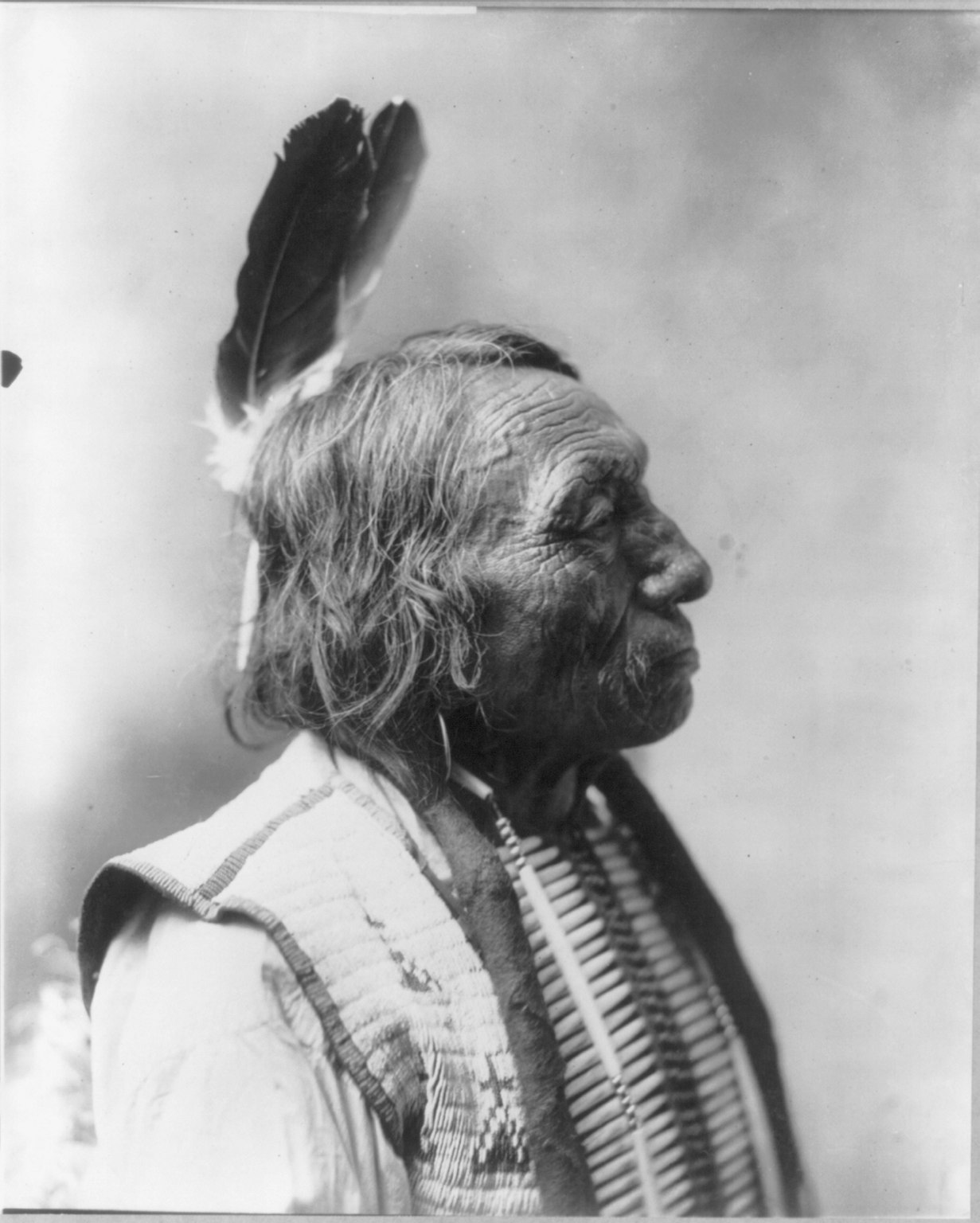
Depiction of native Americans in logos and names of athletic teams were accused of promoting racial stereotypes so the University dropped the Brown Indian mascot

The school's current mascot is the Bona Wolf, the third mascot in school history. The wolf is a reference to the Wolf of Gubbio, a story from the life of St. Francis. The school's colors, brown and white, reflect the colors of Franciscan friar robes. The university is closely affiliated with this religious order.

From 1927 to 1992, St. Bonaventure's mascot was the Brown Indian. The school's athletics logo during this period featured a stylized letter "B" with a war bonnet hanging over the left side. As part of an ongoing debate over Native American mascots, however, this was changed to the Bona Fanatic. This new mascot was poorly received, so much so that costume wearers were assaulted by St. Bonaventure fans. After only a few years (1996–1998) in existence, the Fanatic was dropped in favor of the current Bona Wolf.

== Accolades ==
=== NCAA postseason appearances ===
Sport	Years	App.
Baseball	2004	1
Men's Basketball	1961, 1968, 1970, 1978, 2000, 2012, 2018, 2021	8
Women's Basketball	2012, 2016	2
Men's Tennis	2001, 2003	2
Total Appearances:		13

=== Conference championships ===
Sport	Conference	Years won	Titles
Baseball	Atlantic 10	2004	1
Men's Basketball	Atlantic 10	2012, 2021	2
Men's Swimming and Diving	Atlantic 10	1993, 1999, 2006, 2013, 2014	5
Women's Swimming and Diving	Atlantic 10	1996, 1997, 1998	3
Men's Tennis	Atlantic 10	2001, 2003	2
Total Championships:			13

=== Conference regular-season championships ===
Sport	Conference	Years won	Titles
Men's Basketball	Atlantic 10	2016, 2021	2
Women's Basketball	Atlantic 10	2012	1
Men's Lacrosse	MAAC	2022	1
Total Championships:			4

=== All-Americans ===
==== Men's basketball ====
- Tom Stith, 1960, consensus First Team
- Tom Stith, 1961, consensus First Team
- Bob Lanier, 1968, consensus Second Team
- Bob Lanier, 1970, consensus First Team
- Andrew Nicholson, 2012, AP Honorable Mention
- Jaylen Adams 2018, AP Honorable Mention

=== Bonnies in the Olympics ===
Name	Year	City	Sport	Country	Medal
Ed Don George	1928	Amsterdam	Wrestling	United States	4th
Lou Gregory	1932	Los Angeles	Track	United States	DNF
Barry Mungar	1988	Seoul	Basketball	Canada	6th
Norman Clarke	1988	Seoul	Basketball	Canada	6th
Garvin Ferguson	1988	Seoul	Swimming	Bahamas	32nd, 48th
Tom Fitzgerald	1996	Atlanta	Handball	United States	9th
Ayse Diker	2000	Sydney	Swimming	Turkey	43rd
Stef Collins	2012	London	Basketball	England	11th

==== Bonnies in the Paralympics ====
Name	Year	City	Sport	Country	Medal
Kevin Whalen	2004	Athens	Wheelchair tennis	United States	Round of 16

== Facilities ==
Venue	Sport(s) hosted
Fred Handler Park	Baseball
Reilly Center	Basketball
St. Bonaventure Golf Course	Golf
Tom and Michelle Marra Athletics Complex	Lacrosse; Soccer
Joyce Field	Softball
Reilly Center Pool	Swimming & diving
St. Bonaventure Outdoor Tennis Center	Tennis

== Fight song ==
The school fight song is "Unfurl the Brown and White." The song was written by St. Bonaventure graduates L.G. O'Brien 1925 and C.R. Kean 1924.
