= Canadian University Field Lacrosse Association =

- Sport: Lacrosse
- Founded: 1985
- President: Scott Fox (2024–present)
- No. of teams: 14
- Country: Canada
- Most recent champion: Western Mustangs (2026)
- Most titles: Brock Badgers (19)
- Website: cufla.ca

The Canadian University Field Lacrosse Association (CUFLA) is an association of men's field lacrosse teams connected with several universities in Ontario and Quebec. Teams compete in the fall with league playoffs typically in early November.

== History ==
Founded in 1985, the Canadian University Field Lacrosse Association, or the "CUFLA," was originally known as the Ontario University Field Lacrosse Association (OUFLA) and, as the name suggests, was entirely Ontario-based. Throughout the 1980s and 1990s, OUFLA expanded to include more teams across Ontario.

Having grown to 10 teams in 2002, OUFLA changed its name to the Canadian University Field Lacrosse Association to reflect the additions of McGill University and Bishop's University, both located in Quebec.

The league expanded to 12 teams in 2007 with the additions of Trent (Peterborough) and Laurentian (Sudbury) universities. With these additions the league split into two divisions (east and west) based on geographic location of member schools.

Concordia University in Montreal became the 13th member, the third in Quebec, in 2012.

As it celebrates its 30th year in 2014, the CUFLA has expanded again to 15 teams with the addition of Nipissing University and the University of Ottawa. This ongoing growth bodes well for the continued expansion of men's field lacrosse at various universities across Canada.

Concordia University left after the 2015 season, leaving the league with 14 teams.

== Teams ==
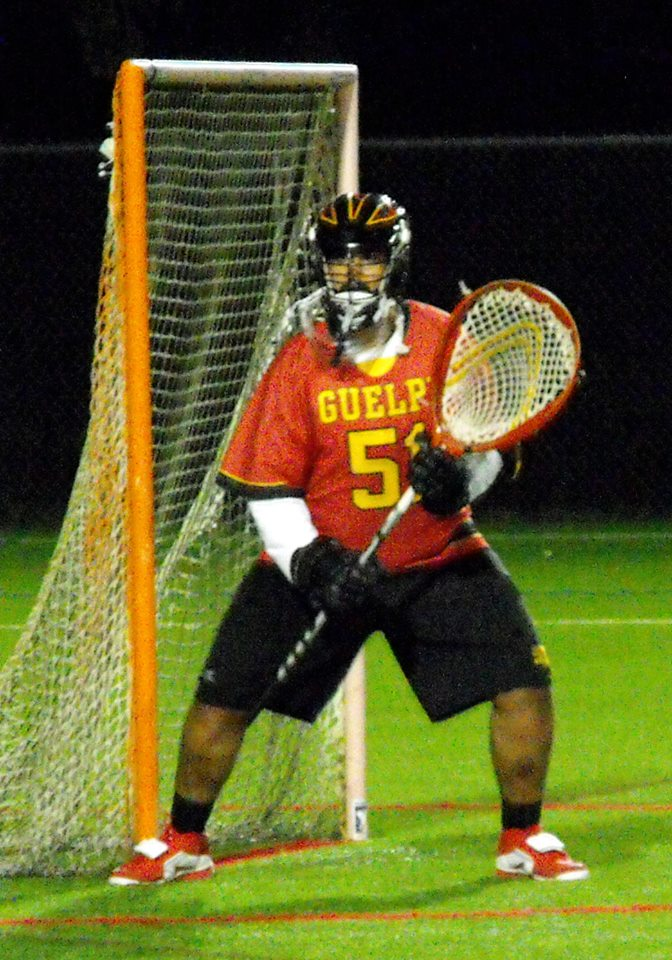
Guelph goalie in 2014

| School | Location | Head coach |
|---|---|---|
| Bishop's Gaiters | Lennoxville, Quebec | Drew Pollock |
| Brock Badgers | St. Catharines, Ontario | Tim Luey |
| Carleton Ravens | Ottawa, Ontario | Jeremy Strong |
| Guelph Gryphons | Guelph, Ontario | Sam Kosakowski |
| Laurentian Voyageurs | Sudbury, Ontario | George Sheppard |
| McGill Redbirds | Montreal, Quebec | Nicolas Soubry |
| McMaster Marauders | Hamilton, Ontario | Jason Tallevi |
| Nipissing Lakers | North Bay, Ontario | Jason Rudge |
| Ottawa Gee-Gees | Ottawa, Ontario | Brett Perras |
| Queen's Golden Gaels | Kingston, Ontario | Connor Kearnan |
| Toronto Varsity Blues | Toronto, Ontario | Jon Moore |
| Trent Excalibur | Peterborough, Ontario | Mark Farthing |
| Western Mustangs | London, Ontario | Chris Standish |
| Wilfrid Laurier Golden Hawks | Waterloo, Ontario | Jonah Boehm |

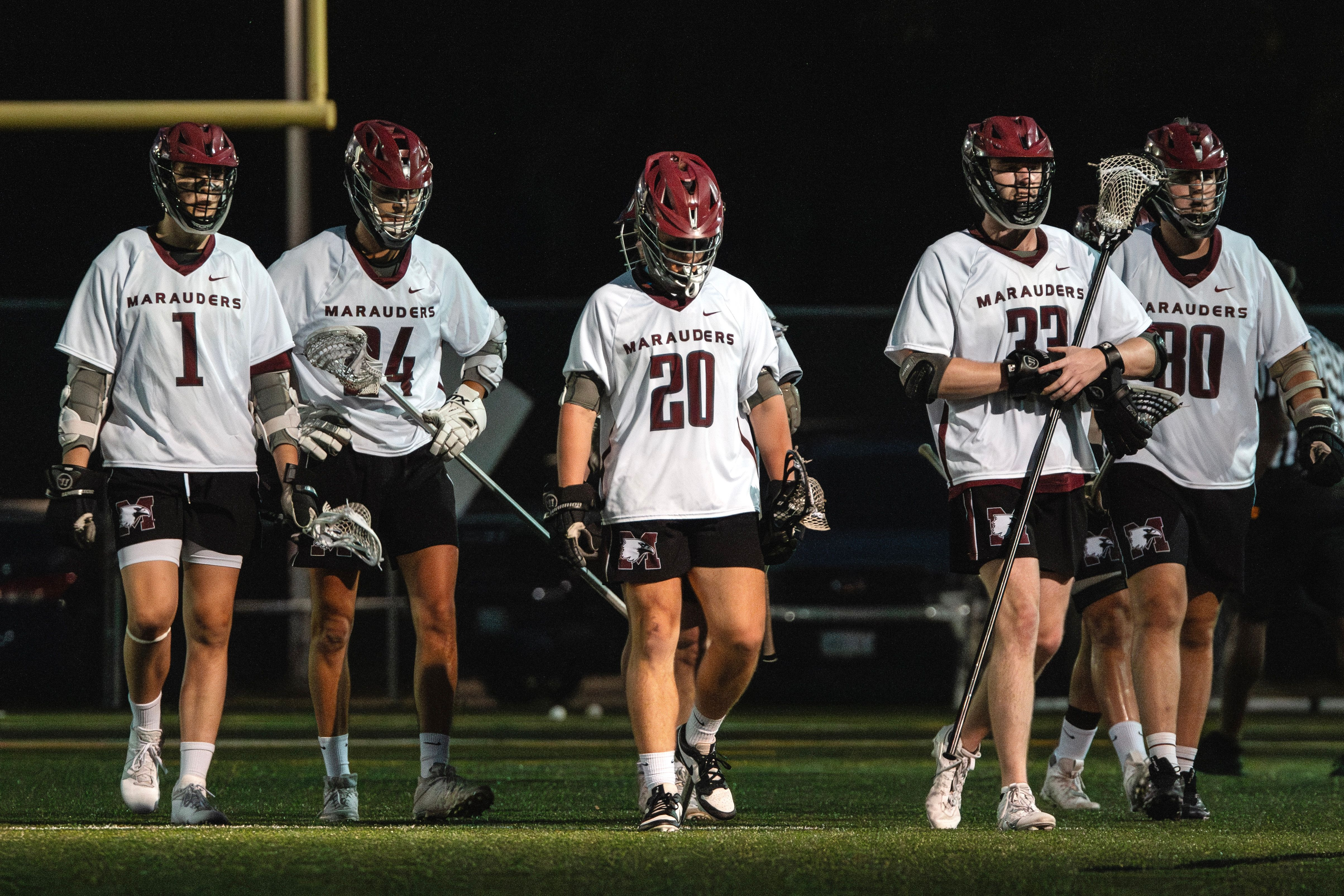
McMaster Lacrosse Players at Alumni Field, Hamilton Ontario. September 2024

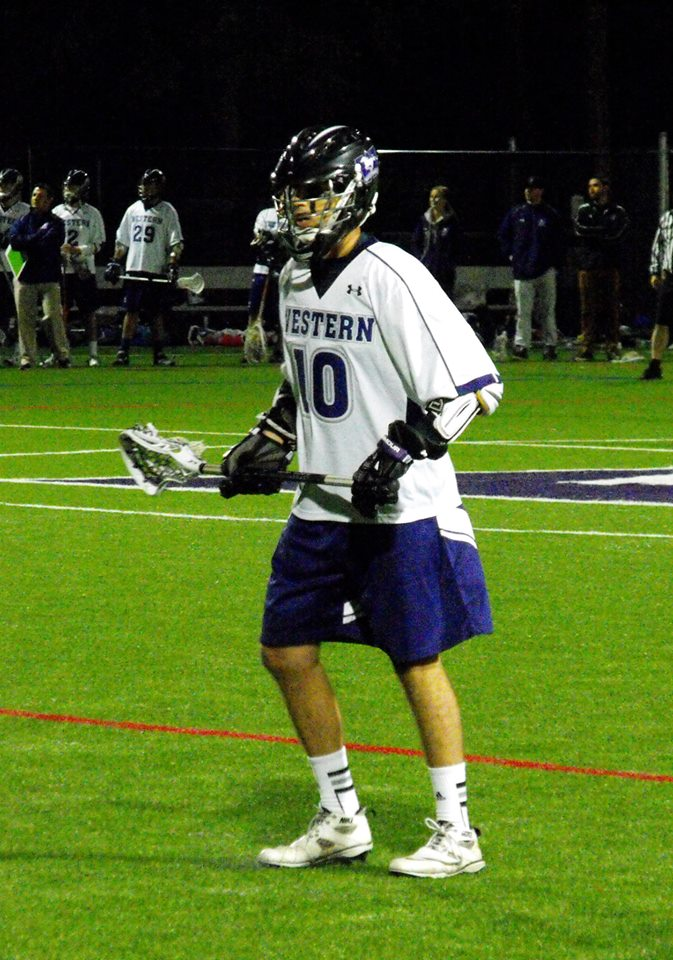
Western player in 2014

Former

- Concordia University – Montreal, Quebec
- Waterloo Warriors – Waterloo, Ontario
- Windsor Lancers – Windsor, Ontario
- York Yeomen – Toronto, Ontario

== Champions ==
The Baggataway Cup is the Canadian university field lacrosse championship, awarded annually to the winner of the post-season tournament by the Canadian University Field Lacrosse Association. The Baggataway Cup tournament is typically held the second weekend in November, and is hosted by one of the member schools.

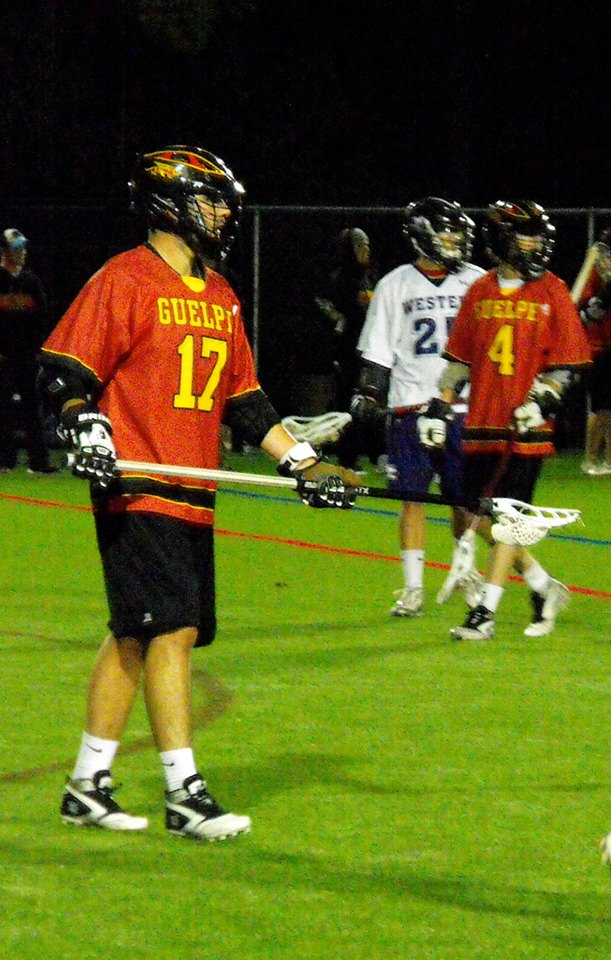
Guelph Defender in 2014

| Year | Champion | Finalist | Score |
|---|---|---|---|
| 1985 | Western Mustangs | | |
| 1986 | Brock Badgers | | |
| 1987 | McMaster Marauders | | |
| 1988 | Western Mustangs | | |
| 1989 | Brock Badgers | | |
| 1990 | Brock Badgers | | |
| 1991 | Brock Badgers | | |
| 1992 | Brock Badgers | | |
| 1993 | Brock Badgers | | |
| 1994 | Brock Badgers | | |
| 1995 | Guelph Gryphons | | |
| 1996 | Brock Badgers | Guelph Gryphons | |
| 1997 | Brock Badgers | Guelph Gryphons | |
| 1998 | Brock Badgers | Guelph Gryphons | 8–6 |
| 1999 | Brock Badgers | Western Mustangs | |
| 2000 | Guelph Gryphons | Brock Badgers | 13–11 |
| 2001 | Western Mustangs | Brock Badgers | 12–10 |
| 2002 | Brock Badgers | Bishop's Gaiters | 9–8, 3OT |
| 2003 | Brock Badgers | Bishop's Gaiters | 10–5 |
| 2004 | Brock Badgers | Bishop's Gaiters | 10–9 |
| 2005 | Brock Badgers | Guelph Gryphons | 14–7 |
| 2006 | Brock Badgers | Bishop's Gaiters | 11–8 |
| 2007 | Brock Badgers | Guelph Gryphons | 13–10 |
| 2008 | Guelph Gryphons | McGill Redmen | 14–9 |
| 2009 | Brock Badgers | McMaster Marauders | 12–11 |
| 2010 | McMaster Marauders | Brock Badgers | 11–10 |
| 2011 | Bishop's Gaiters | Brock Badgers | 11–6 |
| 2012 | McGill Redmen | Western Mustangs | 7–6, 2OT |
| 2013 | Guelph Gryphons | McGill Redmen | 14–11 |
| 2014 | Guelph Gryphons | McGill Redmen | 15–12 |
| 2015 | McGill Redmen | Western Mustangs | 15–11 |
| 2016 | Western Mustangs | Trent Excalibur | 11–7 |
| 2017 | Western Mustangs | Brock Badgers | 16–14, 2OT |
| 2018 | Western Mustangs | Brock Badgers | 9–8, 2OT |
| 2019 | Western Mustangs | Trent Excalibur | 8–5 |
| 2021 | Brock Badgers | Guelph Gryphons | 10–9, OT |
| 2022 | Trent Excalibur | Brock Badgers | 12–3 |
| 2023 | Western Mustangs | McGill Redbirds | 7–4 |
| 2024 | Western Mustangs | Queens Gaels | 11–3 |
| 2025 | Guelph Gryphons | Nipissing Lakers | 16–5 |
| 2026 | Western Mustangs | Guelph Gryphons | 8-6 |

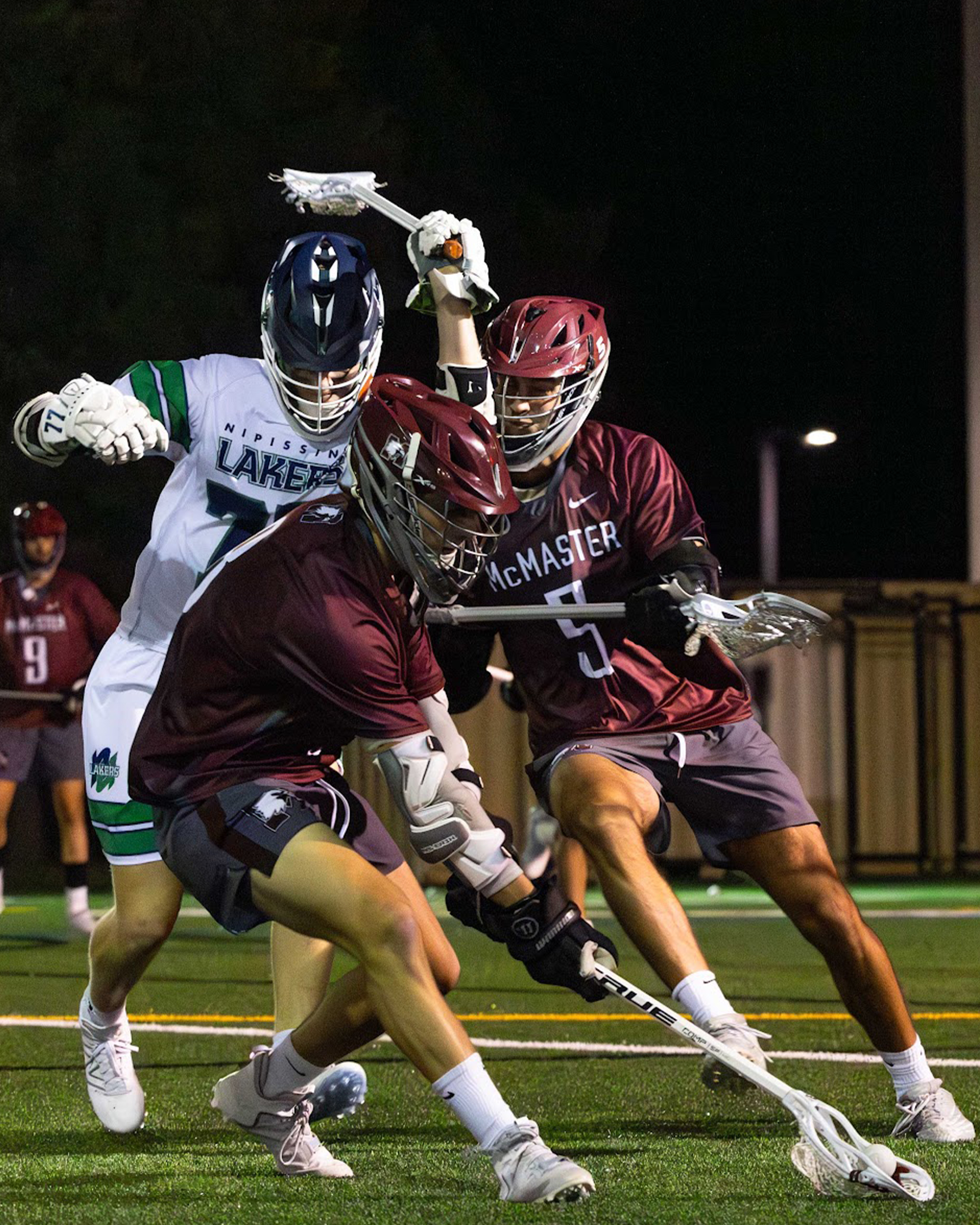
McMaster and Nipissing players Alumni Field, Hamilton Ontario. 2023

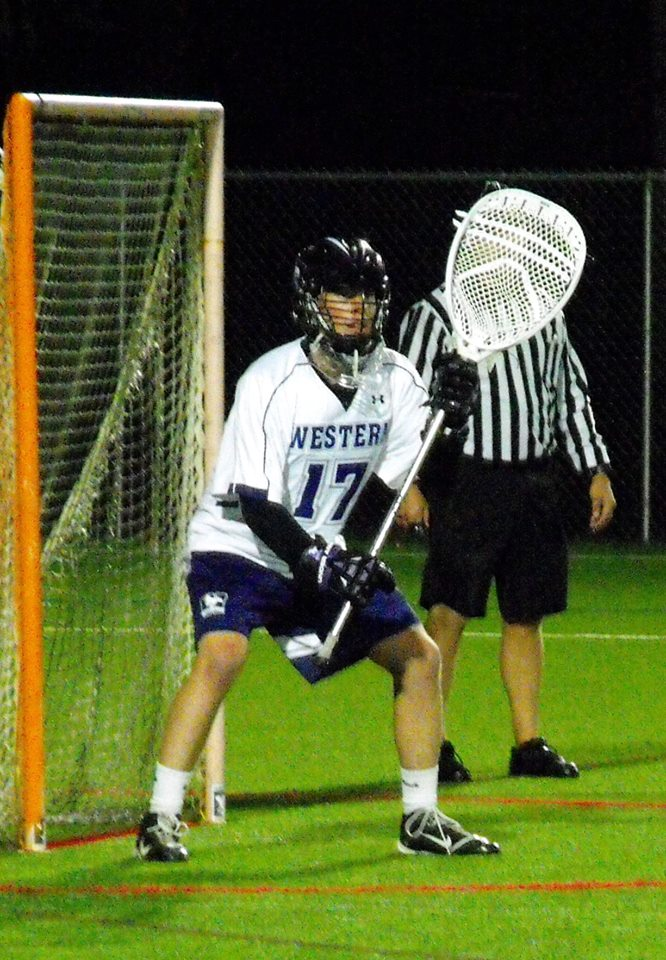
Western goalie Zach Grace (2014)

| Team | Championships | Most recent |
|---|---|---|
| Brock University | 19 | 2021 |
| Western University | 10 | 2026 |
| University of Guelph | 6 | 2025 |
| McGill University | 2 | 2015 |
| McMaster University | 2 | 2010 |
| Bishop's University | 1 | 2011 |
| Trent University | 1 | 2022 |

== Executive ==
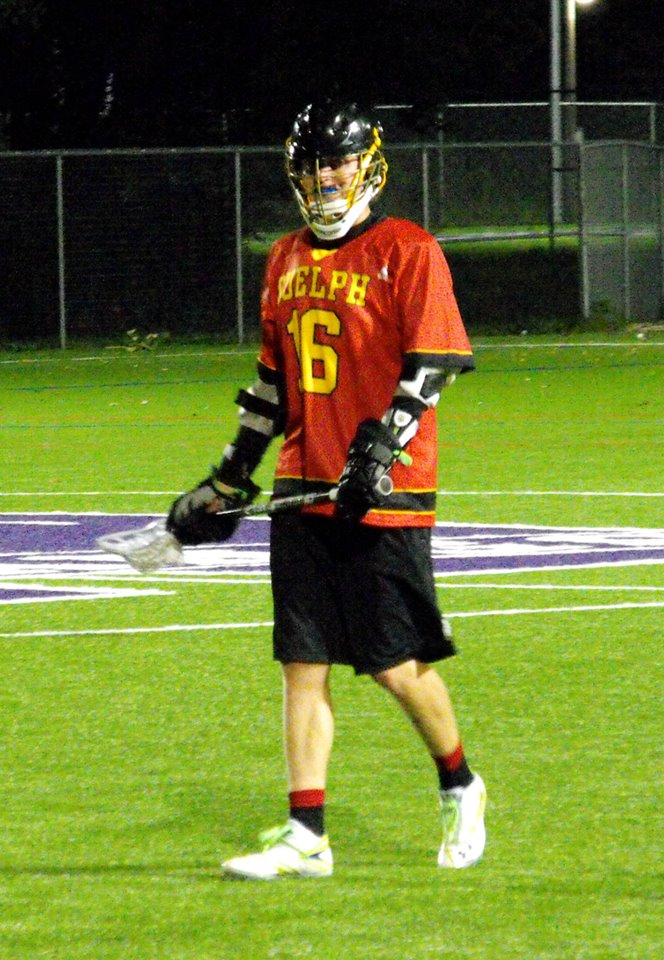
Guelph player in 2014

The operations of CUFLA are handled by an executive that reports regularly to the team presidents, typically at annual general meetings. Currently, the executive is composed of a commissioner, two assistant commissioners, a treasurer, a director of communications, a high school liaison and a referee-in-chief.

- Scott Fox – Commissioner
- Tom Bileski – Deputy Commissioner
- Chris Lesanko – Assistant Commissioner
- Mark Walker – Treasurer
- Michael Drake – Referee in Chief
- Stephen Stamp – Director of Communications
- Jim Price – High School Liaison

== Player eligibility ==
Only current students registered at their respective universities with a full course load are deemed eligible to play in CUFLA competitions. Players who have played professional field lacrosse (such as Major League Lacrosse) are prohibited from playing in CUFLA.

However, players who play professional box lacrosse (such as the National Lacrosse League) are eligible to play. Throughout the years, the league has seen many current and former NLL players scattered throughout various teams.

== Alumni ==
Many current and former players have met with a great deal of success representing their countries or playing professional lacrosse in the National Lacrosse League and Major League Lacrosse.

| Player | Alma mater | National Lacrosse League | Major League Lacrosse | International Competition |
|---|---|---|---|---|
| Kevin Brownell | University of Western Ontario | Buffalo Bandits | None | None |
| Pat Campbell | Brock University | Calgary Roughnecks, Edmonton Rush, Toronto Rock | None | None |
| Mike Carnegie | University of Western Ontario | Calgary Roughnecks | None | Team Canada |
| Angus Dineley | University of Toronto | New York Titans/Orlando Titans, Philadelphia Wings | None | Team Canada |
| Colin Doyle | Wilfrid Laurier University | Ontario Raiders/Toronto Rock, San Jose Stealth | Toronto Nationals | Team Canada |
| Andrew Dowdell | University of Western Ontario | Calgary Roughnecks | None | Team Nederland |
| Jesse Gamble | University of Western Ontario | Toronto Rock | None | Team Canada |
| Bill Greer | University of Western Ontario | Toronto Rock, Edmonton Rush, Rochester Knighthawks, New York Saints, Arizona Sting, Columbus Landsharks | None | Team Canada |
| Greg Harnett | Bishop's University | Calgary Roughnecks | None | None |
| Jon Harnett | University of Guelph | Boston Blazers | None | None |
| Tom Hawke | University of Guelph | Rochester Knighthawks | None | None |
| Steve Hoar | University of Toronto | Toronto Rock | Toronto Nationals | Team Canada |
| Rowan Kelly | University of Western Ontario | Colorado Mammoth | None | None |
| Carter Livingstone | University of Toronto | Boston Blazers, Chicago Shamrox, Rochester Knighthawks | None | None |
| Randy Mearns | University of Western Ontario | Rochester Knighthawks, Buffalo Bandits | None | Team Canada |
| Jamie McKeracher | University of Western Ontario | Anaheim | None | None |
| Ken Millin | Brock University | Toronto Rock, Rochester Knighthawks | None | None |
| Ryan Phillips | University of Western Ontario | Rochester Knighthawks | None | None |
| Creighton Reid | University of Toronto (Practice Squad) | Toronto Rock, Colorado Mammoth | None | None |
| Reid Reinholdt | University of Western Ontario | Toronto Rock | None | None |
| Matt Spanger | University of Western Ontario | New England Black Wolves | None | None |
| Chris Standish | University of Western Ontario | Washington Power | None | None |
| Scott Stapleford | University of Western Ontario | Colorado Mammoth, Toronto Rock, Portland Lumberjacks | None | Team USA |
| Mike Temple | University of Western Ontario | Rochester Knighthawks | None | None |
| Scott Tinning | University of Western Ontario | Edmonton Rush | None | None |
| Sean Thomson | University of Guelph | Philadelphia Wings, Minnesota Swarm | None | None |
| Jay Thorimbert | University of Guelph | Buffalo Bandits, Boston Blazers, Minnesota Swarm | None | None |
| Doug Utting | University of Western Ontario | Rochester Knighthawks | None | Team Israel |
| Josh Wasson | Trent University | Chicago Shamrox, Toronto Rock | None | None |
| Shawn Williams | Brock University | Toronto Rock, Rochester Knighthawks, Edmonton Rush, Buffalo Bandits | None | Team Canada |
| Casey Zaph | University of Toronto | Rochester Knighthawks | None | None |
| Latrell Harris | Brock University | Toronto Rock | None | Team Canada |

== Media coverage ==
Media coverage of CUFLA has grown in recent years, with local and student newspapers devoting several articles to CUFLA's game results. Several lacrosse websites (Lacrosse All Stars, Inside Lacrosse, The Lacrosse News, Lacrosse Bucket , etc.) and magazines have taken notice and included CUFLA in their ongoing coverage of the world of lacrosse.
