= McConnell Arena =

Ice hockey arena

Coordinates: 45°30′43″N 73°34′58″W

McConnell Arena Arèna McConnell
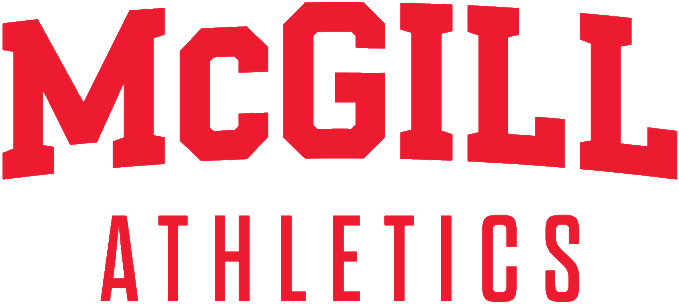

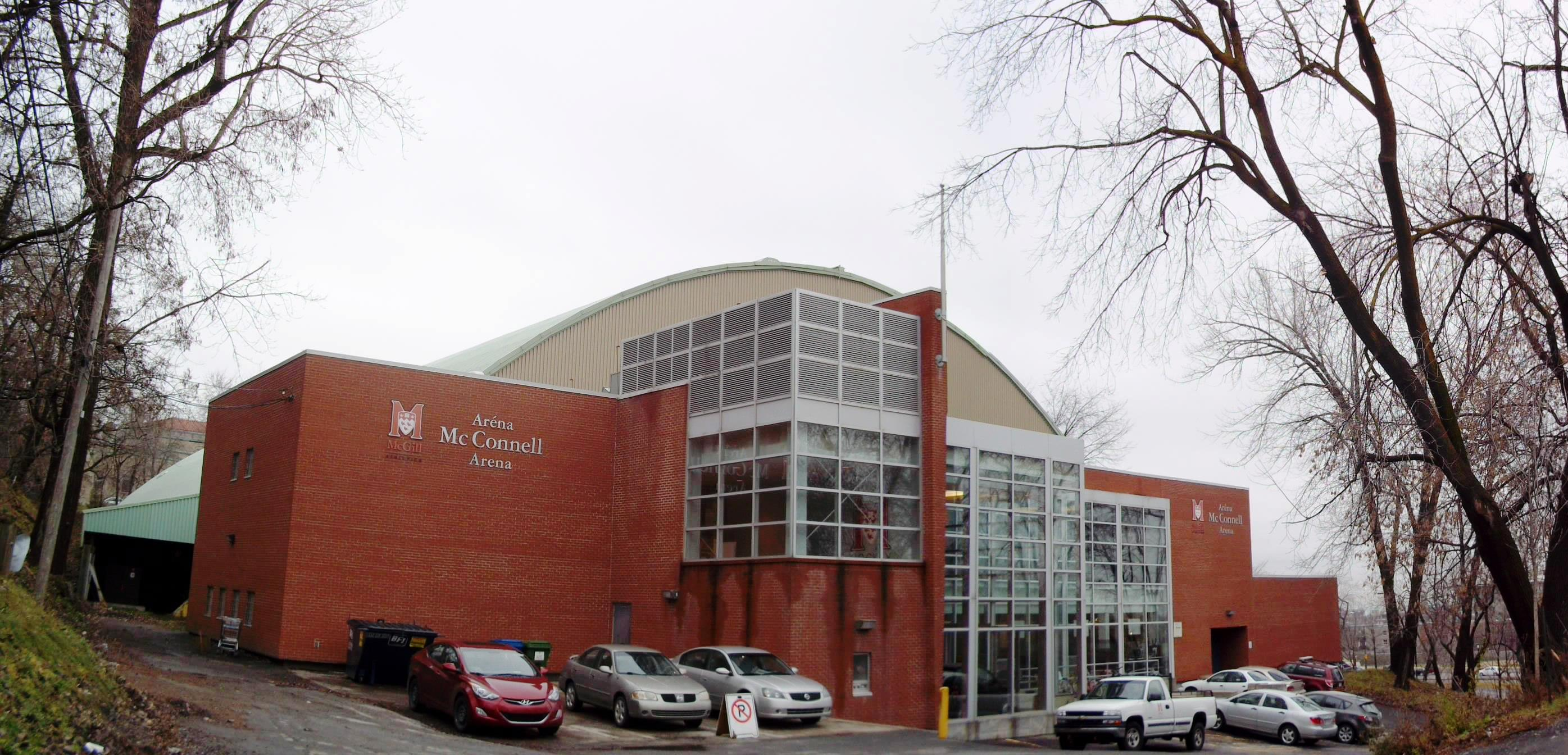
- Interactive map of McConnell Arena; Arèna McConnell
- Former names: McConnell Winter Arena
- Location: 3883 University Street, Montreal, Quebec, Canada
- Owner: McGill University
- Capacity: 1,600

Construction
- Opened: 1956
- Renovated: 2000
- Expanded: 2004

Tenants
- McGill Redbirds, McGill Martlets

McConnell Arena (French: Arèna McConnell) is an ice hockey arena located on the corner of Pine Avenue and Park Avenue right beside Mount Royal in Montreal, Quebec, Canada. The arena is owned and operated by McGill University, and is the home to the McGill Redbirds men's and McGill Martlets women's ice hockey teams. The ice surface is the standard North American size, 61 metres (200 feet) long by 26 metres (85 feet) wide.

Since an expansion in 2004, the arena has a capacity of 1,600 people.

== History ==
McConnell Arena was originally built in 1956 due to a donation by John Wilson McConnell, a Canadian businessman, newspaper publisher, humanitarian, philanthropist and senior governor of McGill University. It was renovated in 2000 at a cost of $4 million.

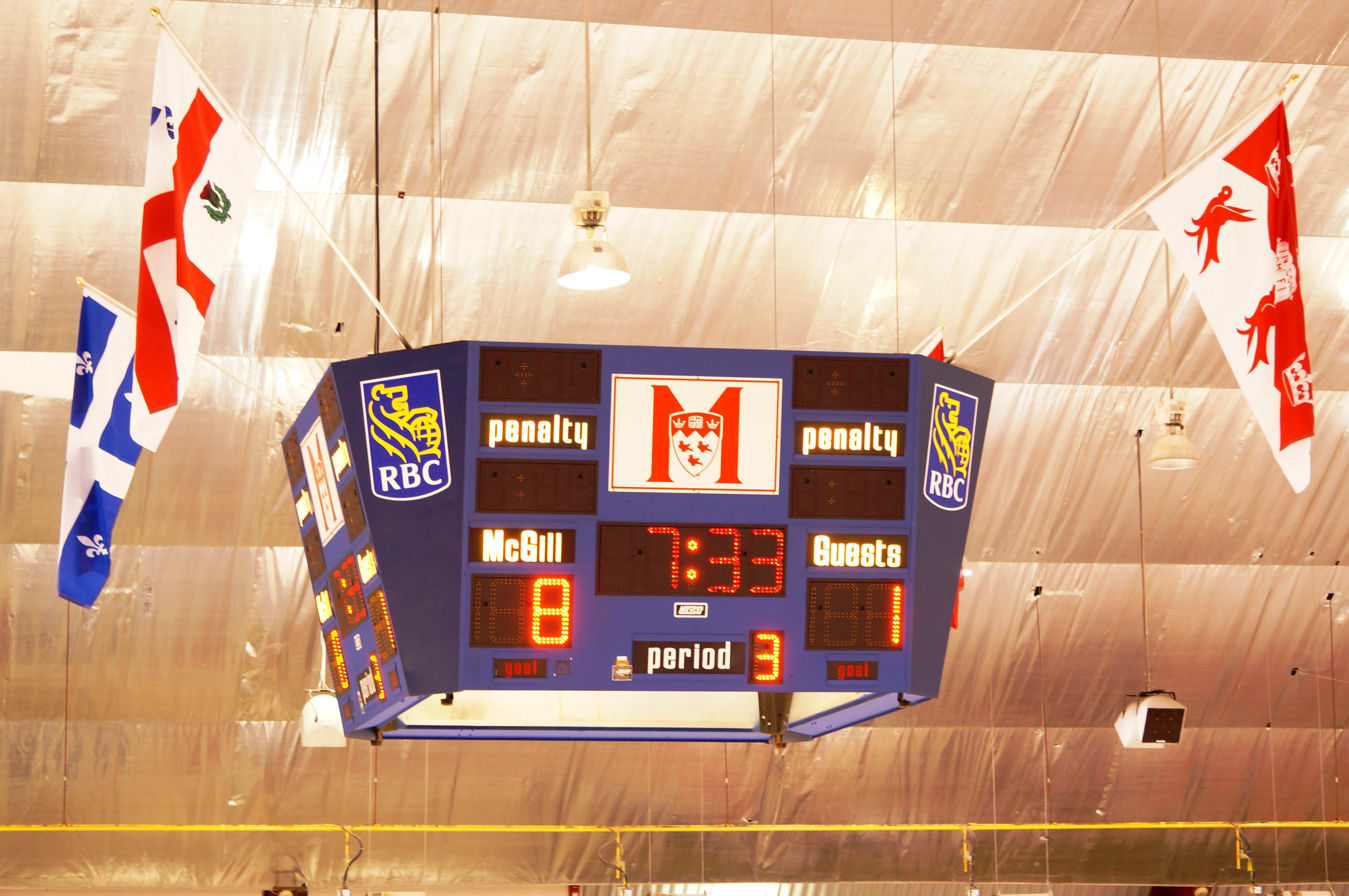
The scoreboard at the McConnell Arena.

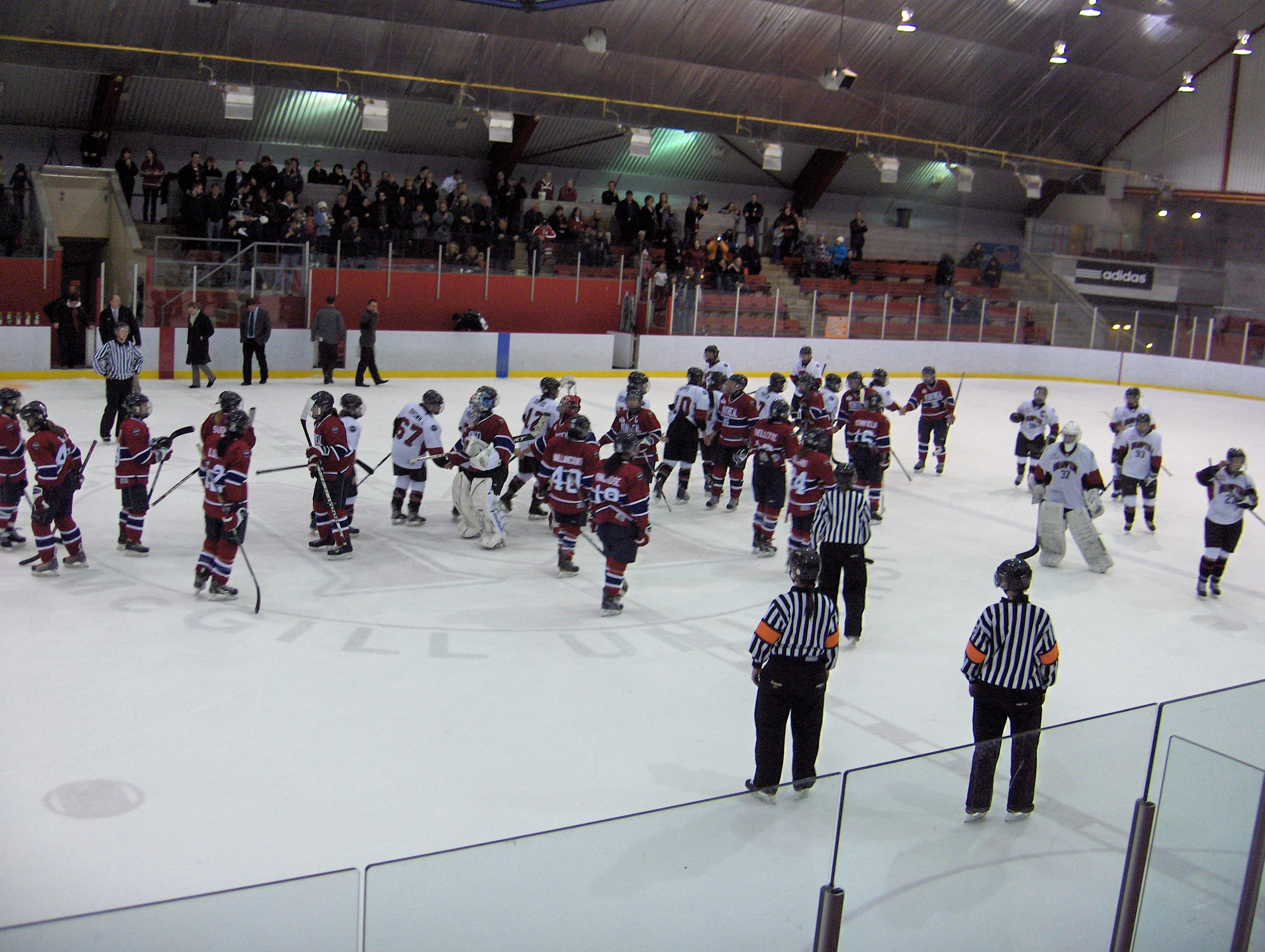
Ice rink of McConnell Arena
