= Ayse Diker =

Turkish swimmer (born 1984)

Ayşe Diker
Personal information
- Full name: Ayşe Diker
- National team: Turkey
- Born: 8 March 1984 (age 42) Istanbul, Turkey
- Height: 1.65 m (5 ft 5 in)
- Weight: 50 kg (110 lb)

Sport
- Sport: Swimming
- Strokes: Butterfly
- Club: Galatasaray Spor Kulübü
- College team: St. Bonaventure University (U.S.)
- Coach: Lance Brennan (U.S.)

Ayşe Diker (born 8 March 1984) is a Turkish former swimmer who specialized in butterfly events. She represented Turkey as a 16-year-old at the 2000 Summer Olympics and held a total of 25 Turkish records in swimming, including the 200 m butterfly. An active member of Galatasaray Spor Kulübü during her sporting career, she also trained for the St. Bonaventure Bonnies swimming and diving team under head coach Lance Brennan from 2003 to 2007.

Diker competed only in the women's 100 m butterfly at the 2000 Summer Olympics in Sydney. She achieved a FINA B-cut of 1:03.67 at the Speedo Turkish Open Championships in Istanbul. In heat two, she challenged six other swimmers, including two-time Olympians Hsieh Shu-ting and María del Pilar Pereyra. Coming from fourth place at the final turn, Diker held off a sprint battle from Pereyra, finishing in 1:04:65 to secure third place in her heat by just a tenth of a second (0.10). However, she failed to advance to the semifinals, finishing forty-second overall on the first day of prelims.
