= McGill University Rowing Club =

- Location: Montreal, Canada
- Founded: 1924; 102 years ago
- University: McGill University
- Website: mcgillathletics.ca/rowing

The McGill University Rowing Club (MURC) is a rowing club that represents McGill University in Montreal, Quebec, Canada. The club is currently a Level 2 intercollegiate program and thus receives partial funding from the university. As the only Quebec university with a varsity rowing program, the club participates in the Ontario University Athletics (OUA) conference. It is a registered club with Rowing Canada.

== History ==
The club dates back to 1924 when it originally operated out of the Lachine Boat Club. Within two years the club established a rivalry opposite the University of Toronto Rowing Club with the inception of the McGill-Toronto boat race. In the ten-year existence of the annual race McGill would only win the first two meetings. By 1939 both crews would cease activities with the outbreak of World War II.

Rowing returned to McGill following the 1976 Summer Olympics with the revived club taking advantage of the then new Olympic Basin and its facilities. Initially only men crews raced with the first women crew taking to the water four years later in 1980. The following year the first Canadian University Rowing Championships (CURC) was held at the basin with McGill acting as hosts. The national championship returned to the basin in 2004, and again in 2009. In 2004 the men's eight won a silver medal, with current national team member Derek O'Farrell as bow seat. The 2009 event saw the women's lightweight coxed four score the Martlet's first ever medal (bronze), and the Redmen's first ever gold medal in the lightweight men's double won by Renaud Garon Gendron and Jonathan Rinaldi.

== Club colours ==
The club colours are red and white matching the colours of the university. The blades are coloured red with two white triangles on the edge forming a sideways M. The logo is the McGill shield in front of two crossed McGill oars with the university's motto Grandescunt Aucta Labore (By work, all things increase and grow) on the bottom.

== Facilities ==
The Olympic Basin on Notre Dame Island acts as the home waterways for the club sharing it and its facilities with the Montreal Rowing Club (MRC). Both clubs are run independently from each other although they do routinely support one another. These facilities include:

- The 2000 metres-plus long basin itself, the only one of its kind in North America.
- The indoor rowing tank, one of only two in Canada and the only one that can accommodate eight rowers.
- Hangars used for storing rowing shells.

The club also has an ergometer room at the Currie Gym, part of McGill's athletic complex. Additionally, athletes have access to the varsity weight room as well as other services.

== McGill-Queen's Boat Race ==
Since 1997 McGill crews have taken on crews from Queen's University in the annual McGill-Queen's Challenge. Considered the Canadian equivalent of the famed Cambridge-Oxford and Harvard-Yale boat races, it takes place in late April alternating between Montreal and Kingston. The 2006 race was hosted by McGill which chose the Lachine Canal as the venue. Reviews were so positive that there has since been talks of making it the permanent home of the race. As of 2018, the race has not been held for a number of years, due to logistical challenges involving exam schedules.

The men race for the Challenge Blade, a port side blade painted with Queen's colours on the inside and McGill colours on the outside. The women compete for the Challenge Trophy which is adorned with the wood handle of a sweep oar. The overall winner receives the D. Lorne Gales Challenge Cup named after original McGill rower D. Lorne Gales.

=== Lorne Gales Challenge Cup Winners ===
2008 - Queen's
2007 - Queen's
2006 - Queen's
2005 - Queen's
2004 - Queen's
2003 - McGill
2002 - McGill
2001 - Queen's
2000 - Queen's
1999 - McGill
1998 - McGill
1997 - McGill

=== Men's Challenge Blade Winners ===
2008 - Queen's
2007 - Queen's
2006 - Queen's
2005 - Queen's
2004 - Queen's
2003 - McGill
2002 - McGill
2001 - Queen's
2000 - McGill
1999 - McGill
1998 - McGill

=== Women's Challenge Trophy Winners ===
2008 - McGill
2007 - Queen's
2006 - McGill
2005 - Queen's
2004 - Queen's
2003 - Queen's
2002 - Queen's
2001 - Queen's
2000 - Queen's
1999 - McGill

== McGill-Toronto Boat Race ==
Since 2020, there has been mutual interest between crews from McGill University and University of Toronto in starting a new annual challenge to take place in early May. The duel would consist of a race between men's and women's eights from the two teams. The Covid-19 Pandemic has postponed efforts to organize the event but both teams remain interested.

The first challenge took place on May 6, 2023, consisting of the men's race and inaugural women's and reserve's races. Initially set to take place at the Lachine Rowing Club, the challenge was moved to the Olympic Basin after extreme weather conditions nearly sank one of Toronto's reserve eights. The men's and women's races took place at the basin, along with a redo of the reserve's race. Toronto won all of them.
