= Randy Mearns =

Canadian lacrosse player and coach (born 1969)

Biographical details
- Born: May 28, 1969 (age 57); St. Catharines, Ontario, Canada
- Education: Canisius College

Playing career
- 1990-1992: Canisius College
- 1993: Buffalo Bandits
- 1995-2001: Rochester Knighthawks
- 2002: Buffalo Bandits

Coaching career (HC unless noted)
- 1997-1998: Canisius Golden Griffins (asst.)
- 1998-2017: Canisius Golden Griffins
- 2017–2025: St. Bonaventure Bonnies
- 2026: Rochester Knighthawks (interim)

Head coaching record
- Overall: 124–219 (.362) (NCAA)

Accomplishments and honors

Championships
- As coach: 2x MAAC Tournament (2008, 2012); 3x MAAC Regular Season (2006, 2008, 2022); 2x World Lacrosse Championship (2006, 2014) As player: 2x NLL Champion (1993, 1997); 5x Mann Cup (1992, 1993, 1994, 1995, 1996); 1x Minto Cup (1990)

Randy Mearns (born May 28, 1969) is a Canadian former lacrosse player who was most recently the interim head coach of the Rochester Knighthawks of the National Lacrosse League (NLL). After a 9-year career in the National Lacrosse League, Mearns became the head coach of the Canisius Golden Griffins men’s lacrosse team, where he would coach for 19 seasons before leaving in 2017 to coach for the newly created lacrosse program at St. Bonaventure.

Mearns, along with the entire 2006 Canadian National lacrosse team, was inducted into the Canadian Lacrosse Hall of Fame, following a lengthy career in the Ontario Lacrosse Association, Major Series Lacrosse and Western Lacrosse Association Canadian professional box lacrosse leagues as a player.

== Canadian box career ==
Mearns played for the St. Catharines Athletics for 5 years. In 1990, Mearns led the team to their first Minto Cup championship since 1950, and was awarded the "Jim McConaghy Memorial Cup" for Minto Cup M.V.P. He was later given the "B.W. Evans Award" for Top Graduating Player. Mearns ranked 36th all time in Canadian Junior A lacrosse assists (regular season and playoffs combined) with 348.

With the Brampton Excelsiors, Mearns won Mann Cup championships in 1992 and 1993, and also won three with the Six Nation Chiefs (’94, ‘95’ ’96).

== College career ==
Mearns was an All-American NCAA lacrosse player at Canisius College from 1990 to 1992 who is currently 20th all-time in Division I career points-per-game (PPG), having scored 95 goals and 95 assists for 190 career points in 39 games. He is also the all-time leading scorer at Canisius.

== Professional career ==
Mearns played professionally for the NLL's Buffalo Bandits and Rochester Knighthawks, acting as captain of the 1997 NLL champion Knighthawk team. Rochester also played in the 1995, 1999 and 2000 finals. Since his retirement from professional lacrosse, he has served as the color commentator for the Bandits' radio broadcasts alongside play-by-play man John Gurtler.

== Coaching career ==
=== College ===
He coached the Canisius men's lacrosse team through 2017, and also was an assistant coach on the Canadian national team that won the gold medal at the 2006 World Lacrosse Championship. Mearns won 94 games in his 18 years of coaching at Canisius, and led the Griffins to their first ever NCAA tournament bid in 2008 where they lost to Syracuse in the first round, and second in 2012 where they lost against Loyola in the first round. Mearns has provided development for his players towards the professional ranks, including Mark Miyashita who graduated from Canisius in 2003 and was the first overall selection in the 2003 National Lacrosse League draft. In a preseason coaches poll, Canisius was picked to repeat in 2009 as MAAC champions. However after a rough start to the season where they lost six straight including 3 one-goal losses, the Griffs ended 2009 on a 4 and 3 run.

Mearns was Head Coach of the Canadian national team that won the gold medal at the 2014 World Lacrosse Championship.

Mearns was named the initial head coach for the St. Bonaventure men's Division I lacrosse team, in June 2017. On April 28, 2025, the University announced that Mearns would not return as head coach.

=== National Lacrosse League ===
On March 10, 2026, Mearns was named the interim head coach of the Rochester Knighthawks. Mearns took over from Mike Hasen, who was fired by Rochester after a 5–6 start to the 2026 season. Mearns led the Knighthawks to a 1–6 finish as the interim head coach.

== Head coaching record ==
=== College ===
Record table
Season	Team	Overall	Conference	Standing	Postseason
Canisius Golden Griffins (MAAC) (1999–2017)
1999	Canisius	4–8	3–5		
2000	Canisius	3–10	3–6		
2001	Canisius	7–6	4–5		
2002	Canisius	5–8	3–4		
2003	Canisius	5–9	5–3		
2004	Canisius	6–7	6–2		
2005	Canisius	5–7	4–4		
2006	Canisius	7–8	6–2	1st	
2007	Canisius	6–8	5–3		
2008	Canisius	10–6	7–1	1st	NCAA First Round
2009	Canisius	4–9	3–5	4th	
2010	Canisius	6–7	5–3	4th	
2011	Canisius	3–9	3–3	2nd	
2012	Canisius	6–8	3–3	4th	NCAA First Round
2013	Canisius	3–10	2–4	4th	
2014	Canisius	7–8	3–3	2nd	
2015	Canisius	3–12	2–4	6th	
2016	Canisius	4–8	3–3	4th	
2017	Canisius	6–9	4–2	3rd	
Canisius:		100–157 (.389)	74–65 (.532)		
St. Bonaventure Bonnies (MAAC) (2019–2022)
2019	Bonaventure	0–13	0–7	8th	
2020	Bonaventure	0–6	0–0		
2021	Bonaventure	5–5	2–4	7th	
2022	Bonaventure	11–4	5–1	1st	
St. Bonaventure Bonnies (Atlantic 10 Conference) (2023–present)
2023	Bonaventure	1–13	0–5	6th	
2024	Bonaventure	1–11	0–5	6th	
2025	Bonaventure	6–10	1–4	6th	
Bonaventure:		24–62 (.279)	8–26 (.235)		
Total:		124–219 (.362)			
National champion Postseason invitational champion Conference regular season champion Conference regular season and conference tournament champion Division regular season champion Division regular season and conference tournament champion Conference tournament champion

=== NLL head coaching statistics ===
Team	Season	Regular Season				Playoffs				Playoff result
Team	Season	GC	W	L	W%	GC	W	L	W%	Playoff result
Rochester Knighthawks	2026*	7	1	6	.143	–	–	–	–	Did not qualify
Totals:	1	7	1	6	.143	–	–	–	–	

* - Interim head coach

== Statistics ==
=== NLL ===
		Regular Season						Playoffs
Season	Team	GP	G	A	Pts	LB	PIM	GP	G	A	Pts	LB	PIM
1993	Buffalo	8	3	3	6	27	4	2	0	0	0	8	2
1995	Rochester	8	2	9	11	29	8	2	0	5	5	10	2
1996	Rochester	10	10	24	34	63	8	1	2	3	5	8	0
1997	Rochester	10	9	17	26	55	18	2	0	6	6	16	0
1998	Rochester	11	7	20	27	44	6	1	0	2	2	2	2
1999	Rochester	10	9	18	27	50	4	2	0	6	6	18	0
2000	Rochester	11	6	20	26	89	6	2	2	2	4	19	2
2001	Rochester	12	2	17	19	75	12	1	0	2	2	3	0
2002	Buffalo	15	14	24	38	66	4	--	--	--	--	--	--
NLL totals		95	62	152	214	498	70	13	4	26	30	84	8

=== OLA ===
			Regular Season					Playoffs
Season	Team	League	GP	G	A	Pts	PIM	GP	G	A	Pts	PIM
1985	Niagara Warriors	OLA Jr B	2	1	1	2	0	--	--	--	--	--
1985	St. Catharines Athletics	OLA Jr A	4	2	2	4	0	--	--	--	--	--
1986	St. Catharines Athletics	OLA Jr A	20	15	25	40	8	10	3	5	8	2
1987	St. Catharines Athletics	OLA Jr A	25	33	70	103	23	9	10	20	30	8
1988	St. Catharines Athletics	OLA Jr A	15	28	33	61	6	6	7	13	20	2
1989	St. Catharines Athletics	OLA Jr A	24	31	61	92	17	11	7	18	25	2
1990	St. Catharines Athletics	OLA Jr A	18	39	62	101	11	9	16	39	55	8
1991	Brampton Excelsiors	MSL	13	14	14	28	2	6	--	6	6	--
1992	Brampton Excelsiors	MSL	14	12	12	24	2	12	14	11	25	6
1993	Brampton Excelsiors	MSL	15	22	31	53	10	9	7	10	17	6
1994	Six Nations Chiefs	MSL	20	15	33	48	43	18	7	24	31	31
1995	Six Nations Chiefs	MSL	18	15	33	48	29	14	4	20	24	19
1996	Six Nations Chiefs	MSL	18	12	22	34	33	6	1	9	10	--
1997	Niagara Falls Gamblers	MSL	15	12	29	41	12	16	16	15	31	24
1998	Buffalo	MSL	10	7	11	18	4	9	5	13	18	4
1999	Brampton Excelsiors	MSL	2	1	3	4	--	19	9	26	35	2
Junior A Totals			106	148	253	401	65	45	43	95	138	22
Senior A Totals			125	110	188	298	135	109	63	134	197	92

=== Canisius College ===
Season	GP	G	A	Pts	PPG
1990	16	45	49	94	5.58
1991	13	30	18	48	3.69
1992	10	20	28	48	4.80
Totals	39	95	95	190	4.87 (a)

^{(a)} 20th in NCAA career points-per-game

== See also ==
- World Lacrosse Championship
