= St. Thomas Tommies (Canada) =

St. Thomas University (Canada) athletic teams

- University: St. Thomas University
- Association: CCAA (primary); U Sports (women's hockey)
- Conference: ACAA (primary); AUS (women's hockey)
- Athletic director: Meaghan Donahue Wies
- Location: Fredericton, New Brunswick
- Varsity teams: 10 (4 men's, 6 women's)
- Basketball arena: Lady Beaverbrook Gym
- Ice hockey arena: Grant-Harvey Centre
- Soccer stadium: Grant-Harvey Turf Field
- Volleyball arena: Lady Beaverbrook Gym
- Rugby venue: Grant-Harvey Turf Field
- Colours: Green and Gold
- Mascot: Tomkat
- Website: www.gotommies.ca

The St. Thomas Tommies are the college sports teams of St. Thomas University (STU) in Fredericton, New Brunswick, Canada. The university fields six women's varsity teams, four men's varsity teams, and one club men's team across six sports. Of the ten varsity teams, nine participate in the Canadian Collegiate Athletic Association (CCAA) as members of the Atlantic Colleges Athletic Association (ACAA), while the women's ice hockey team participates in Atlantic University Sport (AUS) of U Sports.

The Tommies have hosted national championships in a number of sports, including the 2010 CCAA Cross Country Championships, the 2014 CIS Women's Ice Hockey Championship, the 2005 and 2020 CCAA Men's Volleyball Championships, the 2024 CCAA Men's Soccer Championships, and the 2025 CCAA Women's Basketball Championships.

== Nickname ==
The name “Tommies” derives from the Edwardian term for a British private or “Tommy”. These soldiers would be called upon across no-mans-land, if German soldiers wished to speak to a British soldier. “Tommies” were known for their bravery and courage while travelling through the most dangerous grounds of the war.

== Athletic Programs ==
Men's sports	Women's sports
Basketball	Basketball
Cross country	Cross country
Rugby (Club)	Ice hockey
Soccer	Rugby 7s
Volleyball	Soccer
	Volleyball

== Former programs ==
St. Thomas previously fielded teams in badminton, curling, golf, tennis, track and field, women's field hockey, men's football, and men's ice hockey. Men's rugby was offered as a varsity sport until 2022, at which point it became a club level sport, now competing in the 2nd Division of the Atlantic Men's University League.

=== Men's ice hockey ===
A men's ice hockey team at St. Thomas existed at least as early as 1916, though it is unclear if the earliest iterations of the team held varsity status. The squad suspended operations several times during the 20th century, but was in continuous operation from 1979 through the 2015–16 season, at which time the university selected to discontinue the program for budgetary reasons.

Throughout its history, the program had three players that would go on to play in the NHL: Kevin MacDonald, Yannick Tremblay, and Patrick Bordeleau. Former NHL player Al MacAdam was head coach of the program from 1987-1997, while former NHL player Mike Eagles was head coach from 2002-2011.

=== Track and field ===
The Tommies had a co-ed track and field team in the early 1990s, and again in the 2010s and early-2020s. In the 2011-12 season, the Tommies cross country program left the ACAA and joined the AUS, and revived their track and field program in the AUS. This lasted until 2022, when the cross country program left the AUS and rejoined the ACAA, and ended their track and field program.

== Championships and honors ==
keys

- ACAA: Atlantic Colleges Athletic Association
- NBCL: New Brunswick Collegiate League
- NBC: New Brunswick Collegiate
- NBCC: New Brunswick Collegiate Conference
- NBU: New Brunswick Union
- NB-PEI: New Brunswick - Prince Edward Island League
- AUS: Atlantic University Sport
- MIAA: Maritime Intercollegiate Athletic Association

Sport	Assoc.	Titles	Winning years	Ref.
Basketball (women's)	ACAA	7	1993–94, 2008–09, 2010–11, 2011–12, 2012–13, 2013–14, 2025-26	
Basketball (men's)	ACAA	8	1993–94, 1997–98, 1999–2000, 2000–01, 2002–03, 2003–04, 2011–12, 2025-26	
Basketball (men's)	Maine State	1	1987–88	
Basketball (men's)	NBCL	7	1980–81, 1981–82, 1982–83, 1983–84, 1984–85, 1985–86, 1986–87	
Basketball (men's)	NBC	3	1962–63, 1963–64, 1964–65	
Football (men's)	NBC	1	1952–53	
Golf (women's)	ACAA	1	2009–10	
Ice hockey (men's)	AUS	1	2000–01	
Ice hockey (men's)	NBCC	1	1966–67	
Ice hockey (men's)	MIAA	1	1960–61	
Ice hockey (men's)	NB-PEI	2	1950–51, 1958–59	
Ice hockey (women's)	AUS	1	2018–19	
Rugby (women's)	ACAA	3	2007–08, 2010–11, 2011–12	
Rugby (women's)	NB-PEI	2	1996–97, 1997–98	
Rugby (men's)	NBU	3	1951–52, 1952–53, 1953–54	
Soccer (men's)	ACAA	4	2000–01, 2021–22, 2024-25, 2026-27	
Soccer (women's)	ACAA	3	1999–00, 2017–18, 2026-27	
Track and field (men's)	AUS	1	2014–15 (Note: Gold medal awarded to Jonathan Gionet (men's shot put).)	
Volleyball (men's)	ACAA	12	2002–03, 2003–04, 2005–06, 2011–12, 2013–14, 2014–15, 2015-2016, 2017–18, 2019–20, 2021–22, 2023-24, 2025-26	
Volleyball (women's)	ACAA	7	2000–01, 2001–02, 2002–03, 2003–04, 2004–05, 2005–06, 2007–08	

== Other honours ==
=== Women's basketball ===
- CCAA Championship Silver (1): 2014
- CCAA Championship Bronze (1): 2012

=== Men's basketball ===
- CCAA Championship Silver (1): 2004
- CCAA Championship Bronze (1): 2012

=== Women's ice hockey ===
- U Sports women's ice hockey championship appearances (3): 2014, 2016, 2019

=== Men's ice hockey ===
- U Sports men's ice hockey championship appearances (1): 2001

== Athletes of the Year ==
Year	Female athlete	Spot	Male athlete	Sport	Ref.
1975-76	Pauline Brown	Basketball / Volleyball	Gerry Good	Hockey	
1976-77	Pauline Brown	Volleyball	Gerry Good	Hockey	
1977-78	Rachael Dallaire	Basketball / Rugby / Field Hockey	Walter McCarthy	Hockey / Soccer	
1978-79	Rachael Dallaire	Basketball / Field Hockey	Jack Hall	Basketball / Soccer	
1979-80	Sue Hinton	Basketball / Field Hockey	Jack Hall	Basketball / Soccer	
1980-81	Cathy Peckham	Basketball	Tim Kyle	Hockey / Soccer	
1981-82	Leanne Fitch	Basketball	Kirk Firlotte	Hockey	
1982-83	Zoe Chesley	Rugby / Basketball	Stephen Horsman	Basketball	
1983-84	Kathy Alchorn	Rugby / Basketball	Stephen Horsman	Basketball	
1984-85	Bambi Horsman	Basketball / Volleyball / Field Hockey	Scott MacKenzie	Hockey	
1985-86	Bambi Horsman	Basketball / Volleyball / Field Hockey	Stephen Horsman	Basketball	
1986-87	Bambi Horsman	Basketball / Volleyball / Field Hockey	Scott MacKenzie	Hockey	
1987-88	Bambi Horsman	Basketball / Volleyball / Field Hockey	Dirk Bouwer	Soccer / Volleyball	
1988-89	Donna Gee	Basketball / Field Hockey	Rick Poirier	Hockey	
1989-90	Cheryl Hurley	Basketball	Jack Gallagher	Basketball / Cross Country	
1990-91	Lisa Hetherington	Field Hockey / Basketball	Phil Daigle	Soccer / Hockey	
1991-92	Bridget Shipley	Basketball	Phil Daigle	Soccer / Hockey	
1992-93	Jennifer Hogan	Basketball / Soccer	Vojtech Kucera	Hockey	
1993-94	Heike Wendlandt	Basketball / Soccer	Garth Joy	Hockey	
1994-95	Joanne Cluett	Badminton / Soccer	Johnny Lorenzo	Hockey	
1995-96	Joanne Cluett	Badminton / Soccer	Johnny Lorenzo	Hockey	
1996-97	Shauna Paul	Soccer / Rugby / Volleyball	Darren MacIntyre	Soccer	
1997-98	Susan Ross	Rugby / Basketball	Matt Hogan	Hockey	
1998-99	Natalie Arsenault	Rugby	Dave Gilmore	Hockey	
1999-00	Susan Ross	Rugby / Basketball	Mike Bonnar	Basketball	
2000-01	Dawn MacDonald	Rugby	Jason Sands	Hockey	
2001-02	Crystal MacFarlane	Volleyball	David Robson	Basketball	
2002-03	Crystal MacFarlane	Volleyball	Corey Akerley	Volleyball	
2003-04	Crystal MacFarlane	Volleyball	David Robson	Basketball	
2004-05	Liz Gilbert	Volleyball	Josh Hebb	Rugby / Volleyball	
2005-06	Mindy Goodine	Volleyball	Chris Tufts	Volleyball	
2005-06	Emily Hobbs	Hockey	Chris Tufts	Volleyball	
2006-07	Mindy Goodine	Volleyball	Diego Ponce	Soccer	
2007-08	Sarah Braam	Rugby	Matt Davis	Hockey	
2008-09	Alicia Sterling	Basketball	Dan van der Linden	Soccer	
2009-10	Tara Thibault	Volleyball	Ryan MacPherson	Basketball	
2010–11	Heather Atherton	Basketball	Marc Gagnon	Soccer	
2011–12	Ashley Bawn	Basketball	Nathan Mazurkiewicz	Basketball	
2012–13	Kayla Blackmore	Volleyball	Nathan Mazurkiewicz	Basketball	
2013–14	Kelly Vass	Basketball	Jason Cannon	Volleyball	
2014–15	Marissa Walcott	Rugby	Jason Cannon	Volleyball	
2015–16	Kelty Apperson	Ice hockey	Marc Blinn	Volleyball	
2016–17	Kelty Apperson	Ice hockey	Stephane Blinn	Volleyball	
2017–18	Deidra Jones	Volleyball	Christian Christie	Volleyball	
2018–19	Abby Clarke	Ice hockey	Kyle Yearwood	Soccer	
2019–20	Vanessa Soffee	Basketball	Christian Christie	Volleyball	
2020–21	Not awarded due to the COVID-19 pandemic.				
2021–22	Vanessa Soffee	Basketball	Brett Springer	Soccer	
2022–23	Abby Lanteigne	Volleyball	Geoffrey Lavoie	Basketball	
2023–24	Ekaterina Pelowich	Ice hockey	Josh Oakes	Soccer	
2024–25	Kathleen Boyle	Volleyball	Chidubem Nkoloagu	Soccer	
2025–26	Charlee Connors	Basketball	Mason Brewster	Volleyball	
