= St. Thomas Tommies =

St. Thomas Tommies may refer to:

- St. Thomas Tommies (Canada), the athletic teams of St. Thomas University, Fredericton, New Brunswick
- St. Thomas Tommies (Minnesota), the athletic team of the University of St. Thomas, St. Paul–Minneapolis, Minnesota, US
