= 2014 CIS Women's Ice Hockey Championship =

- Season: 2013–14
- Teams: Eight
- Finals site: Grant Harvey Centre; Fredericton, New Brunswick
- Champions: McGill Martlets (4th title)
- Runner-up: Montreal Carabins
- Winning coach: Peter Smith (4th title)
- Championship MVP: Gabrielle Davidson (McGill)

The 2014 CIS Women's Ice Hockey Championship was held March 13–16, 2014, in Fredericton, New Brunswick, to determine a national champion for the 2013–14 CIS women's ice hockey season. The fifth-seeded McGill Martlets defeated the top-seeded Montréal Carabins in double overtime to win the fourth championship in program history.

== Host ==
The tournament was played at the Grant Harvey Centre on the campus of St. Thomas University (STU) in Fredericton, New Brunswick. It was the first championship to be hosted by St. Thomas and marked the first appearance for the Tommies in the national tournament.

== Seedings ==
Six CIS teams qualified for the tournament and were divided into two pools to play a round-robin tournament to determine the two teams who would play in the championship game. The winner of Pool A played the winner of Pool B in the gold medal game.

=== Pool A ===
Seed	Team	Qualified	Record
1	Montréal Carabins	RSEQ Champions	17–3–0
4	Saskatchewan Huskies	Canada West Champions	18–4–6
6	St. Thomas Tommies	AUS Quarter-Finalists (Host)	12–7–5

=== Pool B ===
Seed	Team	Qualified	Record
2	Wilfrid Laurier Golden Hawks	OUA Champions	18–3–3
3	Moncton Aigles Bleues	AUS Champions	14–9–1
5	McGill Martlets	RSEQ Finalists	18–2–0

== Game summaries ==
Date	Time	Teams	Score
March 8	14:00 AST	Pool B #1: No. 2 Laurier vs. No. 5 McGill	McGill (1–0) wins 4-1
March 8	19:00 AST	Pool A #1: No. 1 Montréal vs. No. 4 Saskatchewan	Montréal (1–0) wins 3-0
March 9	14:00 AST	Pool B #2: No. 2 Laurier vs. No. 3 Moncton	Laurier (1–1) wins 6-0
March 9	19:00 AST	Pool A #2: No. 4 Saskatchewan vs. No. 6 St. Thomas	Saskatchewan (1–1) wins 3-2
March 10	14:00 AST	Pool B #3: No. 3 Moncton vs. No. 5 McGill	McGill (2–0) wins 8-2
March 10	19:00 AST	Pool A #3: No. 1 Montréal s. No. 6 St. Thomas	Montréal (2–0) wins 4-0

=== CIS Medal round ===
==== 5th-place game ====
March 16, 2014; 10:00 AST	#3 Moncton	Moncton, 2–1 (1–0, 0–1, 1–0)	#6 St. Thomas	Grant Harvey Centre, Fredericton, New Brunswick; Attendance: 372

Game reference

==== Bronze-medal game ====
March 16, 2014; 14:00 AST	#2 Laurier	Saskatchewan, 6–3 (1–1, 1–2, 1–3)	#4 Saskatchewan	Grant Harvey Centre, Fredericton, New Brunswick; Attendance: 356

Game reference

==== Gold-medal game ====
March 16, 2014; 18:30 AST	#1 Montréal	McGill, 4-3 (2OT) (1–1, 0–1, 2–1, 0–0, 0–1)	#5 McGill	Grant Harvey Centre, Fredericton, New Brunswick; Attendance: 827

Game reference

== Final results ==
(gold) Gold	(silver) Silver	(bronze) Bronze	4th Place	5th Place	6th Place
McGill Martlets	Montréal Carabins	Saskatchewan Huskies	Wilfrid Laurier Golden Hawks	Moncton Aigles Bleues	St. Thomas Tommies
