= David Lutz =

David Lutz may refer to:

- Dave Lutz (born 1959), American football player
- David Lutz (lawyer) (born 1942 or 1943), Canadian lawyer
