= 2013 CIS Women's Ice Hockey Championship =

- Season: 2012–13
- Teams: Eight
- Finals site: Varsity Arena; Toronto, Ontario
- Champions: Montreal Carabins (1st title)
- Runner-up: Calgary Dinos
- Winning coach: Danièle Sauvageau (1st title)
- Championship MVP: Kim Deschênes (Montreal Carabins)

The 2013 CIS Women's Ice Hockey Championship was held March 7–10, 2013, in Toronto, Ontario, to determine a national champion for the 2012–13 CIS women's ice hockey season. The top-seeded Montréal Carabins defeated the defending champion Calgary Dinos to win the first championship in program history.

== Host ==
The tournament was played at Varsity Arena on the campus of the University of Toronto in Toronto, Ontario. It was the second championship to be hosted by Toronto with the first occurring in 1999.

== Seedings ==
Six CIS teams qualified for the tournament and were divided into two pools to play a round-robin tournament to determine the two teams who would play in the championship game. The winner of Pool A played the winner of Pool B in the gold medal game.

=== Pool A ===
Seed	Team	Qualified	Record
1	Montréal Carabins	RSEQ Champions	15–5–0
4	UBC Thunderbirds	Canada West Champions	17–7–4
6	Toronto Varsity Blues	OUA Quarter-Finalists (Host)	12–7–5

=== Pool B ===
Seed	Team	Qualified	Record
2	St. Francis Xavier X-Women	AUS Champions	23–1–0
3	Queen's Golden Gaels	OUA Champions	20–4–2
5	Calgary Dinos	Canada West Finalists	23–4–1

== Game summaries ==
Date	Time	Teams	Score
March 8	13:00 EST	Pool B #1: No. 2 St. Francis Xavier vs. No. 5 Calgary	Calgary (1–0) wins 4-0
March 8	19:30 EST	Pool A #1: No. 1 Montréal vs. No. 6 Toronto	Montréal (1–0) wins 1-0
March 9	16:00 EST	Pool B #2: No. 2 St. Francis Xavier vs. No. 3 Queen's	St. Francis Xavier (1–1) wins 2-1
March 9	19:30 EST	Pool A #2: No. 4 UBC vs. No. 6 Toronto	Toronto (1–0–1) wins 5-4
March 10	16:00 EST	Pool B #3: No. 3 Queen's vs. No. 5 Calgary	Calgary (2–0) wins 5-4
March 10	19:30 EST	Pool A #3: No. 1 Montréal s. No. 4 UBC	Montréal (2–0) wins 5-3

=== CIS Medal round ===
==== 5th-place game ====
March 10, 2013; 12:00 EST	#3 Queen's	UBC, 2–1 (0–0, 0–2, 1–0)	#4 UBC	Varsity Arena, Toronto, Ontario; Attendance: 220

Game reference

==== Bronze-medal game ====
March 10, 2013; 15:30 EST	#2 St. Francis Xavier	St. Francis Xavier, 3–2 (OT) (0–0, 1–1, 1–1, 1–0)	#6 Toronto	Varsity Arena, Toronto, Ontario; Attendance: 515

Game reference

==== Gold-medal game ====
March 10, 2013; 19:00 EST	#1 Montréal	Montréal, 3-2 (1–1, 2–1, 0–0)	#5 Calgary	Varsity Arena, Toronto, Ontario; Attendance: 532

Game reference

== Final results ==
(gold) Gold	(silver) Silver	(bronze) Bronze	4th Place	5th Place	6th Place
Montréal Carabins	Calgary Dinos	St. Francis Xavier X-Women	Toronto Varsity Blues	UBC Thunderbirds	Queen's Golden Gaels
