= St. Thomas Tommies (Canada) women's ice hockey =

St. Thomas Tommies women's ice hockey
- University: St. Thomas University
- Conference: AUS
- Governing Body: U Sports
- Head coach: Peter Murphy; Since 2002–03 season
- Assistant coaches: Genevieve David; Kirk Gormley
- Arena: Grant-Harvey Centre; Fredericton, NB
- Colors: Green and Gold

U Sports tournament appearances
- 2014, 2016, 2019

Conference tournament champions
- 2019

The St. Thomas Tommies women's ice hockey program represents St. Thomas University in the Atlantic University Sport conference of U Sports. In their history, the Tommies have featured 86 Academic All-Canadians. In 2019, the program captured their first-ever AUS championship.

== History ==
In the 2015–16 season, the Tommies, led by captain Kelty Apperson, soared to a 16–7–1 regular season record. With 26 points, Apperson ranked second overall in the AUS scoring race.

Finishing first place in the 2018–19 AUS regular season, boasting a 22–5–1 record, the Tommies goals against average of 1.58 ranked second in the conference. Among the most accomplished players of that season, Emily Oleksuk recorded a superlative 34 points, ranking second among all AUS skaters, fourth in U Sports. Of note, her 23 assists ranked first in both AUS and U Sports, also leading the Tommies in game-winning goals with seven, complemented by four power play goals and a plus-minus rating of +16. In the aftermath of the season, Oleksuk captured the AUS Top Defensive Player Award, a first in program history.

=== Season-by-season record ===
Won championship	Lost championship	Conference champions	League leader

Year	Coach	W	L	OTL	Conf	GF	GA	Pts	Finish	Conference Tournament
2019–20	Peter Murphy									
2018–19	Peter Murphy	22	5	1					1st	
2017–18	Peter Murphy									
2016–17	Peter Murphy									
2015–16	Peter Murphy									
2014–15	Peter Murphy									

=== Season team scoring champion ===
Year	Player	GP	G	A	PTS	PIM	AUS rank
2019–20	Mariah Carey	28	10	4	14	10	28th
2018–19	Emily Oleksuk	28	11	23	34	12	2nd
2017–18	Alexandra Woods		6	17	23	18	8th
2016–17	Lauren Henman	24	15	14	29	18	6th
2015–16	Kelty Apperson	24	12	14	26	6	2nd

=== Team captains ===
- 2015–16: Kelty Apperson
- 2016–17: Kelty Apperson
- 2017–18:
- 2018–19: Emily Oleksuk
- 2019–20: Emily Oleksuk

== Rivalries ==
University of New Brunswick

UNB Reds victories	St. Thomas victories	Tie games

No.	Date	Location	Winning team		Losing team	
1	October 14, 2018	Fredericton	St. Thomas	2	UNB Reds	1 (OT)
2	November 7, 2018	Fredericton	St. Thomas	2	UNB Reds	1
3	November 28, 2018	Fredericton	St. Thomas	2	UNB Reds	1
4	January 9, 2019	Fredericton	UNB Reds	3	St. Thomas	1
5	October 5, 2019	Fredericton	UNB Reds	3	St. Thomas	0
6	October 23, 2019	Fredericton	St. Thomas	2	UNB Reds	1
7	November 27, 2019	Fredericton	St. Thomas	2	UNB Reds	1
8	January 4, 2020	Fredericton	St. Thomas	3	UNB Reds	2
9	January 15, 2020	Fredericton	UNB Reds	5	St. Thomas	1
Series: St. Thomas leads 6–3

== International ==
- Kelty Apperson, Forward, Canada: Ice hockey at the 2017 Winter Universiade (silver)
- Ekaterina Peliwich, Forward, Canada: Ice hockey at the 2025 Winter World University Games (silver)

== Awards and honours ==
=== U Sports Awards ===
- Kayla Blackmore: 2012–13 Marion Hilliard Award

==== U Sports Nationals ====
Player of the Game Award

- 2016 CIS Women's Ice Hockey Championship

Game	Players	Teams
March 17: Guelph vs. St. Thomas	Averi Nooren; Taylor Cook	Guelph; St. Thomas
March 18: McGill vs. St. Thomas	Olivia Sutter; Kelty Apperson	McGill; St. Thomas
March 20: Calgary vs. St. Thomas	Hayley Dowling; Myfanwy Thomson	Calgary; St. Thomas

=== AUS Awards ===
- Julia Sharun: 2008–09 AUS Rookie of the Year
- Kayla Blackmore: 2010–11 AUS Most Sportsmanlike Player
- Kayla Blackmore: 2011–12 AUS Community Service Award
- Kayla Blackmore: 2012–13 AUS Community Service Award
- Kelty Apperson: 2015–16 AUS Most Valuable Player
- Becky Conner: 2016–17 AUS Most Sportsmanlike Player
- Emily Oleksuk: 2018–19 AUS Top Defensive Player
- Peter Murphy: 2018–19 AUS Coach of the Year

=== AUS All-Stars ===
==== First Team ====
- Emily Hobbs, Goaltender: 2004–05, 2005–06, 2006–07
- Kayla Blackmore, Forward: 2012–13
- Kristen Wolfe, Goaltender: 2013–14
- Kelty Apperson, Forward: 2015–16,
- Eliza Snider, Defense: 2016–17 First Team
- Lauren Henman, Forward: 2018–19
- Alexandra Woods, Defense: 2017–18, 2018–19

==== Second Team ====
- Emily Hobbs, Goaltender: 2003–04
- Hannah Muir, Forward: 2003–04
- Lucrèce Nussbaum, Defense: 2008–09, 2009–10
- Julia Sharun, Goaltender: 2010–11
- Kayla Blackmore, Forward: 2011–12
- Katie Brewster, Forward: 2012–13, 2013–14
- Kelty Apperson, Forward: 2016–17
- Jessie McCann, Defense: 2015–16, 2016–17
- Abby Clarke, Goaltender: 2018–19
- Emily Oleksuk, Forward: 2018–19
- Caroline Pietroski, Goaltender: 2021–22
- Aislynn Byers, Defense, 2021–22
- Alex Woods, Defense, 2019–20, 2021–22

==== AUS All-Rookies ====
- Julia Sharun, Goaltender: 2008–09
- Kayla Blackmore, Forward: 2008–09
- Kristin Wolfe, Goaltender: 2009–10
- Amy Kelbaugh, Forward: 2009–10
- Danielle Miller, Forward: 2011–12
- Eliza Snider, Defense: 2012–13
- Becky Conner, Forward: 2014–15
- Lauren Henman, Forward: 2014–15
- Jessie McCann, Defense: 2015–16
- Lauren Legault, Forward: 2016–17
- Alexandra Woods, Defense: 2016–17
- Olivia Reid, Forward: 2017–18
- Aislynn Byers, Defense: 2019–20
- Erin Arsenault, Forward: 2019–20
- Amy Dvernichuk, Forward: 2022–23

=== University awards ===
- Kelly Hogg: 2006 St. Thomas University Tommies Coastal Graphics Female Athlete of the Year (co-winner)
- Kayla Blackmore: 2013 St. Thomas University Tommies Coastal Graphics Female Athlete of the Year
- Kelty Apperson: 2016 and 2017 St. Thomas University Tommies Coastal Graphics Female Athlete of the Year
- Abby Clarke: 2019 St. Thomas University Tommies Coastal Graphics Female Athlete of the Year
- Florence Awde: 2022 St. Thomas University Tom McCann Memorial Trophy – Student ideal among graduating members of the University

=== Team awards ===
Most Valuable Player

- 1998–99: Kristy Dionne
- 1999–2000: Kristy Dionne
- 2000–01: Natalie Oake
- 2001–02: Cindy Fraser
- 2002–03: Hannah Muir
- 2003–04: Emily Hobbs
- 2006–07: Karlee Shields
- 2007–08: Ashley Duguay
- 2008–09: Julia Sharun
- 2009–10: Kayla Blackmore
- 2010–11: Kayla Blackmore
- 2011–12: Kayla Blackmore
- 2012–13: Kayla Blackmore
- 2013–14: Kristin Wolfe
- 2014–15: Kelty Apperson
- 2015–16: Kelty Apperson
- 2016–17: Kelty Apperson
- 2017–18: Abby Clarke
- 2018–19: Abby Clarke
- 2019–20: Emily Oleksuk
- 2021–22: Mariah Carey
- 2022–23: Caroline Pietroski

Most Improved Player

- 1999–2000: Stacey Kane
- 2001–02: Missy Cormier
- 2002–03: Alanna MacNevin
- 2003–04: Amy Simpson
- 2006–07: Renee Edison
- 2007–08: Renee Edison
- 2008–09: Nicole Dube
- 2009–10: Amanda Burns
- 2010–11: Andrea Fisher
- 2011–12: Carly Critch
- 2012–13: Stephanie Gates
- 2013–14: Laura Bray
- 2014–15: Cassidy McTaggart
- 2015–16: Samantha Squires
- 2016–17: Alisha Gilbert
- 2017–18: Mariah Carey
- 2018–19: Megan Pardy
- 2019–20: Mariah Carey
- 2021–22: Libby Howatt
- 2022–23: Natalie McKay

Rookie of the Year

- 2001–02: Kelly Manual
- 2002–03: Hannah Muir
- 2003–04: Rebekah Thompson
- 2006–07: Karlee Shields
- 2007–08: Dominique Bernier
- 2008–09: Julia Sharun
- 2009–10: Amy Kelbaugh
- 2010–11: Jordan Miller
- 2011–12: Dani Miller
- 2012–13: Kelty Apperson
- 2013–14: Myfanwy Thomson
- 2014–15: Becky Conner
- 2015–16: Emily Oleksuk
- 2016–17: Alex Woods
- 2017–18: Olivia Reid
- 2018–19: Florence Awde
- 2019–20: Caroline Pietroski
- 2021–22: Ekatarina Pelowich
- 2022–23: Amy Dvernichuk

Top Defensive Player

- 2001–02: Kelly Manual
- 2002–03: Marie-Paule Deveau
- 2003–04: Kelly Manuel
- 2006–07: Rebekah Thompson
- 2007–08: Lucrece Nussbaum
- 2008–09: Lucrece Nussbaum
- 2009–10: Lucrece Nussbaum
- 2010–11: Courteney Fox
- 2011–12: Courteney Fox
- 2012–13: Courtney Fox
- 2013–14: Caley Steinert
- 2014–15: Eliza Snider
- 2015–16: Eliza Snider and Caley Steinert
- 2016–17: Eliza Snider
- 2017–18: Alex Woods and Teah Anderson
- 2018–19: Emily Oleksuk
- 2019–20: Alex Woods
- 2021–22: Alex Woods
- 2022–23: Aislynn Byers

== Tommies in professional hockey ==
= CWHL All-Star	= NWHL All-Star	= Clarkson Cup Champion	= Isobel Cup Champion

Player	Position	Team(s)	League(s)	Years	Titles
Kelty Apperson	Defense	Calgary Inferno; SDE Hockey	CWHL; SDHL	4 Active player	2019 Clarkson Cup
Taylor Cook	Goaltender	Vålerenga	Norway		

== See also ==
St. Thomas Tommies (Canada) men's ice hockey
