= 2010–11 Montreal Carabins women's ice hockey season =

- Conference: QSSF
- Home ice: CEPSUM

Record

Coaches and captains
- Head coach: Isabelle Leclaire
- Assistant coaches: Marie-Claude Roy; Patrick Lariviere

The 2010-11 season was the Carabins second season in the Canadian Interuniversity Sport women's ice hockey championship (CIS). The Carabins ranked in second place in the Quebecois conference behind the McGill Martlets. In the 2011 playoffs, the Carabins eliminated the Concordia Stingers but the Carabins are in turn to eliminate in finale by McGill. The Carabins were unable to qualify for the 2011 CIS Canadian championships.

== Regular season ==
=== Roster ===
Goaltenders
| Number | | Player |
|---|---|---|
| 31 | (Canada) | Rachel Ouellette |
| 32 | (Canada) | Joanie Grand-Maison |
| 35 | (Canada) | Katrina Giuliani |

Defencemen
| Number | | Player |
|---|---|---|
| 5 | (Canada) | Valérie Gobeil |
| 8 | (Canada) | Stéphanie Daneau |
| 10 | (Canada) | Josée-Ann Deschênes |
| 16 | (Canada) | Janique Duval |
| 18 | (Canada) | Édith Aubert-Lehoux |
| 21 | (Canada) | Sophie Brault |
| 89 | (Canada) | Marie-Ève Couture |
| 91 | (Canada) | Vicky Denis |

Forwards
| Number | | Player |
|---|---|---|
| 4 | (Canada) | Annie-Claude Dumas |
| 9 | (Canada) | Kim Deschênes |
| 11 | (Canada) | Fabienne Marcotte |
| 17 | (Canada) | Audrey Fortin |
| 22 | (Canada) | Marie-Denise Ethier |
| 24 | (Canada) | Cassandra Dupuis |
| 27 | (Canada) | Jessica Gagné |
| 28 | (Canada) | Josianne Legault |
| 40 | (Canada) | Caroline Martin-Guay |
| 66 | (Canada) | Mélissa Globensky |
| 82 | (Canada) | Claudine Michaud |
| 87 | (Canada) | Amanda Lalande |
| 94 | (Canada) | Marie-Andrée Leclerc-Auger |

=== Staff ===
- General manager Danièle Sauvageau
- Councillor-Adviser France St-Louis
- Head Coach: Isabelle Leclaire
- Assistant Coach: Brittany Privée
- Assistant Coach: Pascal Daoust
- Goalkeeper Coach: Patrick Larivière

== Awards and honors ==
- Forwards Josianne Legault, Kim Deschênes, defenders Stéphanie Daneau, Janique Duval and goaltender Rachel Ouellette were named to the All-Star teams of the league.
- In the gold medal game of the 2011 Winter Universiade, Kim Deschênes scored one of four goals for Canada as they claimed the gold medal.

== See also ==
- 2009–10 Montreal Carabins women's ice hockey season
- Montreal Carabins women's ice hockey
- Montreal Carabins
- Canadian Interuniversity Sport women's ice hockey championship
