= The Thomists =

Canadian big band jazz ensemble

The Thomists is a 21-piece big band based at St. Thomas University in Fredericton, New Brunswick, Canada.

== History ==
The Thomists was formed in affiliation with St. Thomas University in 1965 by Professor Harry Rigby, and it was soon playing at parties and dances on campus.

The band has continued to play across the Maritimes and beyond for over 45 years, and has over 900 pieces in its repertoire. The band has counted scores of University of New Brunswick and St. Thomas students amongst its ranks throughout its history. The Thomists have recorded several records and CDs; most recently "90 and Zero".

The band includes many long time players, including its founder and organist, Harry Rigby, and lead vocalist Bill Richardson, first trumpet Don Lévesque, and second trumpet Roy Stevens.
