= 2009–10 Montreal Carabins women's ice hockey season =

- Conference: QSSF
- Home ice: CEPSUM

Rankings
- CIS Top 10: 9

Record
- Overall: 13-6-1

Coaches and captains
- Head coach: Isabelle Leclaire
- Assistant coaches: Marie-Claude Roy; Patrick Lariviere

The 2009-10 Montreal Carabins women's ice hockey season was their first season competing in the Canadian Interuniversity Sport (CIS). Their 13-6-1 conference record ranked second during the QSSF regular season. Overall, the Carabins had a won loss record of 15 wins, nine losses, and one tie. In their first season in the CIS, the Carabins qualified for the CIS National Championship tournament.

== Conference standings ==
2009–10 QSSF
| | Conference | | | | | | |
| | GP | W | L | T | GF | GA | PTS |
|---|---|---|---|---|---|---|---|
| McGill | 20 | 20 | 0 | 0 | 79 | 18 | 40 |
| Montréal | 20 | 13 | 6 | 1 | 58 | 55 | 27 |
| Ottawa | 20 | 8 | 11 | 1 | 51 | 67 | 17 |
| Carleton | 20 | 8 | 12 | 0 | 39 | 47 | 16 |
| Concordia | 20 | 1 | 16 | 3 | 35 | 75 | 5 |

== Schedule ==
| Date | Time | Opponent | Location | Score |
|---|---|---|---|---|
| October 16 | 7pm | Concordia | CEPSUM | 4-1 |
| October 17 | 7pm | @ Carleton | Ottawa | 1-0 |
| October 23 | 7pm | Ottawa | CEPSUM | 3-2 |
| October 25 | 3pm | @ Concordia | Montréal | 4-3 (OT) |
| October 30 | 7pm | McGill | CEPSUM | 2-7 |
| November 1 | 2pm | Carleton | CEPSUM | 4-2 |
| November 7 | 2pm | @ McGill | Montréal | 2-3 (OT) |
| November 13 | 7pm | Ottawa | CEPSUM | 4-1 |
| November 15 | 3pm | @ Concordia | Montréal | 3-2 (OT) |
| November 27 | 7pm | McGill | CEPSUM | 1-5 |
| November 29 | 2pm | Carleton | CEPSUM | 4-3 |
| January 10 | 2pm | Carleton | CEPSUM | 3-0 |
| January 15 | 7pm | Concordia | CEPSUM | 8-2 |
| January 16 | 6pm | @ Ottawa | Ottawa | 2-5 |
| January 22 | 7pm | @ McGill | Montréal | 0-3 |
| January 24 | 3pm | @ Concordia | Montréal | 5-3 |
| January 30 | 2pm | @ Ottawa | Ottawa | 2-4 |
| February 14 | 1pm | @ Carleton | Ottawa | 3-2 |
| February 19 | 7pm | McGill | CEPSUM | 1-6 |
| February 20 | 6pm | @ Ottawa | Ottawa | 2-1 |

== Player stats ==
| # | Name | Pos | GP | G | A | PTS | PIM | PPG | SHG |
|---|---|---|---|---|---|---|---|---|---|
| 9 | Kim Deschenes | F | 20 | 14 | 14 | 28 | 12 | 4 | 0 |
| 94 | Marie-Andree Leclerc-Auger | F | 18 | 12 | 12 | 24 | 42 | 2 | 0 |
| 87 | Amanda Lalande | F | 20 | 7 | 12 | 19 | 12 | 3 | 0 |
| 4 | Annie-Claude Dumas | F | 20 | 5 | 6 | 11 | 6 | 1 | 0 |
| 27 | Jessica Gagne | F | 20 | 3 | 6 | 9 | 12 | 0 | 0 |
| 7 | Marie-Helene Suc | D | 18 | 3 | 4 | 7 | 18 | 3 | 0 |
| 11 | Fabienne Marcotte | F | 20 | 3 | 4 | 7 | 6 | 0 | 0 |
| 40 | Caroline Martin-Guay | F | 20 | 2 | 5 | 7 | 16 | 0 | 0 |
| 10 | Josee-Ann Deschenes | D 20 | 2 4 | 6 | 8 | 0 | 0 | | |
| 18 | Edith Aubert-Lehoux | D | 20 | 3 | 1 | 4 | 8 | 3 | 0 |
| 5 | Pascale Leblanc | D | 19 | 0 | 4 | 4 | 10 | 0 | 0 |
| 8 | Stephanie Daneau | D | 18 | 1 | 2 | 3 | 14 | 0 | 0 |
| 17 | Audrey Fortin | F | 20 | 1 | 2 | 3 | 8 | 0 | 0 |

== Awards and honors ==
- Kim Deschênes Forward, QSSF 1st all-star team
- Marie-Hélène Suc Defence, QSSF 1st all-star team
- Marie-Andrée Leclerc-Auger Forward, QSSF 2nd all-star team
- Kim Deschênes, QSSF Rookie of the year

== See also ==
- 2010–11 Montreal Carabins women's ice hockey season
- Montreal Carabins
- Canadian Interuniversity Sport women's ice hockey championship
