= Kevin MacDonald (ice hockey) =

Canadian ice hockey player and coach (born 1966)

- Born: February 24, 1966 (age 59) Prescott, Ontario, Canada
- Height: 6 ft 0 in (183 cm)
- Weight: 200 lb (91 kg; 14 st 4 lb)
- Position: Defence
- Shot: Right
- Played for: NHL; Ottawa Senators; AHL; New Haven Nighthawks; Prince Edward Island Senators; Hershey Bears; IHL; Muskegon Lumberjacks; Phoenix Roadrunners; Fort Wayne Komets; Chicago Wolves; ECHL; Baton Rouge Kingfish
- NHL draft: Undrafted
- Playing career: 1988–1998

Kevin Scott MacDonald (born February 24, 1966) is a Canadian ice hockey coach and former professional ice hockey player.

Except for playing one game in the National Hockey League (NHL) with the Ottawa Senators during the 1993–94 NHL season, MacDonald played his entire career in the minor leagues. He played in the International Hockey League (IHL), American Hockey League (AHL), and East Coast Hockey League (ECHL).

== Roller hockey ==
MacDonald played one game of professional roller hockey when he suited up for the Ottawa Loggers (RHI) in 1996.

== Coaching ==
Following his playing career, MacDonald spent three seasons (1998–2001) as the head coach of the Bakersfield Condors in the WCHL.

== Career statistics ==
=== Regular season and playoffs ===
			Regular season					Playoffs
Season	Team	League	GP	G	A	Pts	PIM	GP	G	A	Pts	PIM
1982–83	Brockville Braves	CCHL	45	1	4	5	154	—	—	—	—	—
1983–84	Belleville Bulls	OHL	4	0	0	0	4	—	—	—	—	—
1983–84	Sudbury Wolves	OHL	1	0	0	0	0	—	—	—	—	—
1983–84	Peterborough Petes	OHL	32	3	3	6	78	8	0	1	1	16
1984–85	Peterborough Petes	OHL	63	3	13	16	162	15	1	1	2	6
1985–86	Peterborough Petes	OHL	51	4	15	19	132	16	0	5	5	24
1986–87	Peterborough Petes	OHL	48	4	4	8	183	10	0	1	1	16
1987–88	St. Thomas University	CIAU	24	7	14	21	140	—	—	—	—	—
1988–89	Muskegon Lumberjacks	IHL	64	2	13	15	190	11	2	3	5	22
1989–90	New Haven Nighthawks	AHL	27	0	1	1	111	—	—	—	—	—
1989–90	Phoenix Roadrunners	IHL	30	1	5	6	201	—	—	—	—	—
1990–91	Phoenix Roadrunners	IHL	74	1	9	10	327	11	0	1	1	22
1991–92	Phoenix Roadrunners	IHL	76	7	14	21	304	—	—	—	—	—
1992–93	Phoenix Roadrunners	IHL	6	0	1	1	23	—	—	—	—	—
1992–93	Fort Wayne Komets	IHL	65	4	9	13	283	11	0	0	0	21
1993–94	Ottawa Senators	NHL	1	0	0	0	2	—	—	—	—	—
1993–94	PEI Senators	AHL	40	2	4	6	245	—	—	—	—	—
1993–94	Fort Wayne Komets	IHL	29	0	3	3	140	15	0	4	4	76
1994–95	Chicago Wolves	IHL	75	1	12	13	390	3	0	0	0	17
1995–96	Chicago Wolves	IHL	75	2	6	8	274	9	0	3	3	23
1996–97	Fort Wayne Komets	IHL	53	1	2	3	251	—	—	—	—	—
1996–97	Hershey Bears	AHL	16	1	1	2	74	12	1	0	1	13
1997–98	Hershey Bears	AHL	5	0	0	0	37	—	—	—	—	—
1997–98	Baton Rouge Kingfish	ECHL	58	2	17	19	222	—	—	—	—	—
IHL totals			547	19	74	93	2383	60	2	11	13	181
NHL totals			1	0	0	0	2	—	—	—	—	—

== See also ==
- List of players who played only one game in the NHL
