= Carolyn Layden-Stevenson =

Carolyn Layden-Stevenson (23 July 1947 - 27 June 2012) was a Canadian judge. She ruled on a number of cases and motions involving suspects accused of links to militant and terrorist organisations.

Layden-Stevenson was born in Saint John, New Brunswick. Layden-Steven studied at the New Brunswick Teachers' College, St. Thomas University and University of New Brunswick. She received a Bachelor of Teaching in 1970 and a Bachelor of Arts in 1971, both from St. Thomas University. She worked as a guidance counsellor and teacher from 1967 until 1981.

She received a Bachelor of Laws in 1984 from the University of New Brunswick. She was called to the Bar of New Brunswick in 1981, and made partner at Stevenson & Stevenson in Fredericton the following year.

After seventeen years with the firm, she was appointed Judge of the Federal Court of Canada, Trial Division and ex-officio member of the Court of Appeal (the Appeal Division) on 25 January 2002. She was also appointed Judge of the Court Martial Appeal Court of Canada on 18 April 2002. After the Federal Court was split into two separate courts via the Courts Administration Service Act in 2003, she became a Judge of the Federal Court on 2 July 2003. She was appointed to the Federal Court of Appeal on 12 December 2008.

Layden-Stevenson died on 27 June 2012 in Ottawa, Ontario.
