= Harry Forestell =

Canadian television journalist

Harry Forestell is a Canadian television journalist and former news anchor for the Canadian Broadcasting Corporation. He is most noted as a Canadian Screen Award nominee for Best Host or Interviewer in a News or Information Program or Series at the 12th Canadian Screen Awards in 2024.

A graduate of St. Thomas University and Carleton University, he worked for CBC Radio One as a producer of local radio programming on CBC Windsor and CBC Toronto in the early 1990s, before moving to London in 1995 to work as a freelancer for several international news organizations.

He rejoined the CBC in 1997 as its UK correspondent, with coverage of the death of Diana, Princess of Wales being among his first major assignments. In 1999 he returned to Canada as a business reporter, and later becoming a full-time anchor on CBC Newsworld, first on CBC News: Morning and later on CBC News Today.

On February 15, 2010, he became the anchor of CBAT-TV's evening newscasts.

In 2015 Forestell announced that he had been diagnosed with Parkinson's disease. He continued in the anchor role for CBC New Brunswick, and produced several pieces of journalism for the network about his treatment journey, including a 2023 first-person essay about his experiences undergoing deep brain stimulation surgery. In May 2023 he interviewed Michael J. Fox, a fellow Parkinson's patient, about the release of the documentary film Still: A Michael J. Fox Movie. Broadcast on The National, the interview garnered Forestell his 2024 Canadian Screen Award nomination.

In October 2023, Forestell announced that he was stepping down from full-time anchoring due to his Parkinson's, although he indicated that he would be continuing to work for the network on special projects.
