= David Lutz (lawyer) =

Canadian lawyer and King's Counsel

David Lutz KC
- Born: 1942 or 1943 (age 83–84); Erie, Pennsylvania, United States
- Education: Washington & Jefferson College (B.A., 1967); St. Thomas University (B.Ed., 1974); University of New Brunswick (LL.B, 1977)
- Occupation: Lawyer
- Years active: 1977–2024

David Lutz KC (born 1942 or 1943) is a Canadian lawyer and King's Counsel. Throughout his career, Lutz served as a criminal defense lawyer and as a crown prosecutor throughout up to 5,000 trials and 100 jury trials.

== Life and career ==
David Lutz was born in 1942 or 1943, in Erie, Pennsylvania. He was educated at the Washington & Jefferson College where in 1967 he graduated with a Bachelor of Arts in Political Science and American History. Initially, he taught in New York until 1969 when he immigrated to New Brunswick, Canada as a conscientious objector to the Vietnam War. In 1974, he received a Bachelor of Education at St. Thomas University. He worked as a teacher, principal and social worker, and in 1977 graduated from the University of New Brunswick's law school and was admitted to the bar. That same year, he founded the Lutz Parish Gerrish law firm, based in his residence of Hampton; the firm has additional offices in St. Stephen, Saint Andrews, and Sussex. Lutz specialized in criminal and family law during his career.

Around 1990, Lutz served as the vice-president of the New Brunswick Law Society. In 1992, he was appointed Queen's Counsel, and from 1997 to 2005 he was a columnist on social issues and legal news for Brunswick News. He represented Justin Bourque, the perpetrator of the 2014 Moncton shootings who shot and killed three Royal Canadian Mounted Police (RCMP) officers and wounded two. As a result of the incident, Bourque was sentenced with the longest penalty in Canadian history. In 2015, he received the Franklin O. Leger Q.C. Award presented by the Law Society of New Brunswick. During the 2016 United States presidential election, Lutz worked as a volunteer in the Hillary Clinton presidential campaign in Florida. In November 2024, Lutz announced that he will be retiring after finalizing cases in December.
