= Garth Joy =

Canadian ice hockey player and scout

- Born: August 3, 1968 (age 57) Kirkland Lake, Ontario, Canada
- Height: 5 ft 11 in (180 cm)
- Weight: 176 lb (80 kg; 12 st 8 lb)
- Position: Defence
- Shot: Left
- Played for: Vojens IK
- NHL draft: 222nd overall, 1986; Minnesota North Stars
- Playing career: 1995–1997

Garth Joy (born August 3, 1968, in Kirkland Lake, Ontario) is a retired minor hockey player and a current scout. He is currently a scout for the New York Rangers ice hockey team.

== Playing career ==
A native of Kirkland Lake, ON and the son of Ken and Goldie, Garth Joy played for the Hamilton Steelhawks of the OHL for two seasons until he was drafted. Joy was selected 222nd overall in the 1986 NHL entry draft. He was 11th choice of the Minnesota North Stars, but never played a game in the NHL. He continued to play major junior hockey for the Hamilton Steelhawks before being acquired by the Kingston Raiders, another OHL team. After a year with the Raiders, he was too old to play ice hockey at the junior level. He enrolled at St. Thomas University, where he played from 1991 to 1994 and was selected as an All-Canadian in 1993. In 1993, he was asked to play for Team Canada in the World Championships. He appeared in two games, scoring one goal. Following his college career Joy played two season for Vojens in the Danish elite series men's ice hockey team.

== Career statistics ==
			Regular season					Playoffs
Season	Team	League	GP	G	A	Pts	PIM	GP	G	A	Pts	PIM
1984-85	Hamilton Steelhawks	OHL	58	4	23	27	36	17	2	6	8	27
1985-86	Hamilton Steelhawks	OHL	50	6	31	37	64	-	-	-	-	-
1986-87	Hamilton Steelhawks	OHL	66	6	43	49	56	9	0	2	2	4
1987-88	Hamilton Steelhawks	OHL	62	10	36	46	105	14	1	6	7	8
1988-89	Kingston Raiders	OHL	50	10	33	43	37	-	-	-	-	-
1992-93	Canadian National Team	IIHF	2	1	0	1	0	-	-	-	-	-
1993-94	St. Thomas University	CIAU	26	9	25	34	39	-	-	-	-	-
1995-96	Vojens IK	Denmark	40	2	11	13	79	-	-	-	-	-
1996-97	Vojens IK	Denmark	46	6	18	24	105	-	-	-	-	-
