= Kelty Apperson =

Canadian ice hockey forward

- Born: September 26, 1994 (age 32) New Hamburg, Ontario, Canada
- Height: 175 cm (5 ft 9 in)
- Weight: 68 kg (150 lb; 10 st 10 lb)
- Position: Forward
- Shoots: Right
- PWHPA team: Calgary
- Played for: SDE Hockey; Calgary Inferno; St. Thomas Tommies
- National team: Canada
- Playing career: 2012–present
Medal record
Universiade
Silver medal – second place	2017 Almaty	Ice hockey

Kelty Apperson (born October 26, 1994) is a retired Canadian ice hockey forward, most recently affiliated with the Calgary chapter of the Professional Women's Hockey Players Association (PWHPA). She won the Clarkson Cup with the Calgary Inferno in 2019.

== Career ==
Apperson served as captain for the St. Thomas (Canada) Tommies women's ice hockey program represting St. Thomas University in Fredericton, New Brunswick, a member of the Atlantic University Sport regional association of U Sports. She was named Atlantic University Sport MVP in 2016. In her final season of university hockey, she was named to the Canadian roster that competed in Ice hockey at the 2017 Winter Universiade

After graduating from university, she signed her first professional contract with the Calgary Inferno of the Canadian Women's Hockey League (CWHL). She scored 6 points in 25 games in her second CWHL season, as the club won the Clarkson Cup.

After the CWHL collapsed in May 2019, Apperson joined the ForTheGame movement. Eight days later, she became the first ForTheGame player to sign an overseas contract when she signed with SDE Hockey in Sweden. She scored 18 points in 36 in her first season with SDE, serving as an alternate captain as the club made the SDHL playoffs for the first in its history.

=== International ===
Apperson represented Team Canada at the 2017 Winter Universiade, scoring seven points in five games as the country won a silver medal.

== Career statistics ==
			Regular Season					Playoffs
Season	Team	League	GP	G	A	Pts	PIM	GP	G	A	Pts	PIM
2017–18	Calgary Inferno	CWHL	28	4	5	9	8	3	0	0	0	0
2018–19	Calgary Inferno	CWHL	25	3	3	6	4	4	0	0	0	2
2019–20	SDE Hockey	SDHL	36	10	8	18	24	2	0	0	0	0
SDHL totals			36	10	8	18	24	2	0	0	0	0
CWHL totals			53	7	8	15	12	7	0	0	0	2

== Awards and honors ==
- 2015–16 Atlantic University Sport Most Valuable Player
- Atlantic University Sport First Team All-Star: 2015–16 and 2016–17
- 2016 and 2017 St. Thomas University Tommies Coastal Graphics Female Athlete of the Year
- Player of the Game: 2016 CIS Women's Ice Hockey Championship - March 18: McGill vs. St. Thomas
