= Montreal Carabins women's ice hockey =

Canadian university ice hockey team

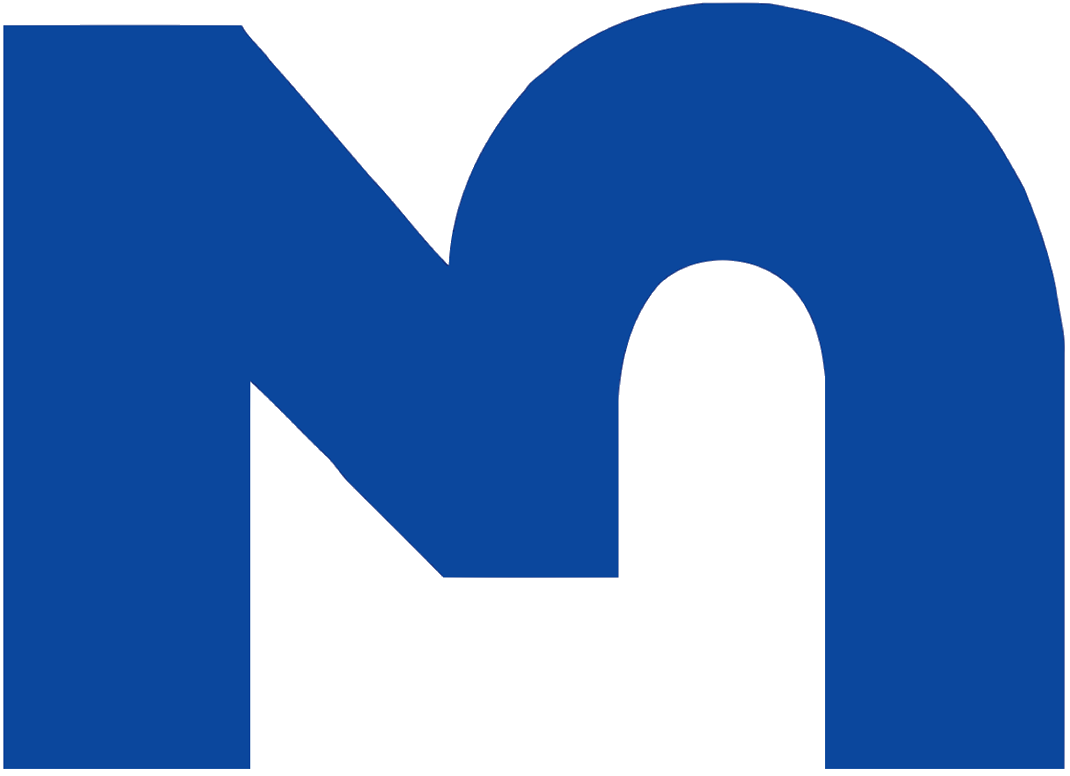
- University: Université de Montréal
- Conference: RSEQ
- Athletic director: Danièle Sauvageau
- Head coach: Isabelle Leclaire → since 2008–09 season
- Assistant coaches: Marie-Ève Ruel; Simon Hardy; Stéphanie Poirier; Philippe Trahan
- Captain(s): Jessika Boulanger (2023–24)
- Arena: Winter Stadium at CEPSUM; Montreal, Quebec
- Colors: Royal Blue, White, and Black

U Sports tournament champions
- 2013, 2016, 2026

Conference tournament champions
- 2013, 2014, 2016, 2019

The Montreal Carabins women's ice hockey team defend the colours of the Université de Montréal and are members of the Quebec Student Sports Federation (RSEQ), and compete for the Canadian Interuniversity Sport women's ice hockey championship. One Carabins player have participated internationally, including the World Student Games. Home games are contested at l'aréna du CEPSUM. In addition, the Women's ice hockey team are connected to the club Montreal Carabins.

== History ==
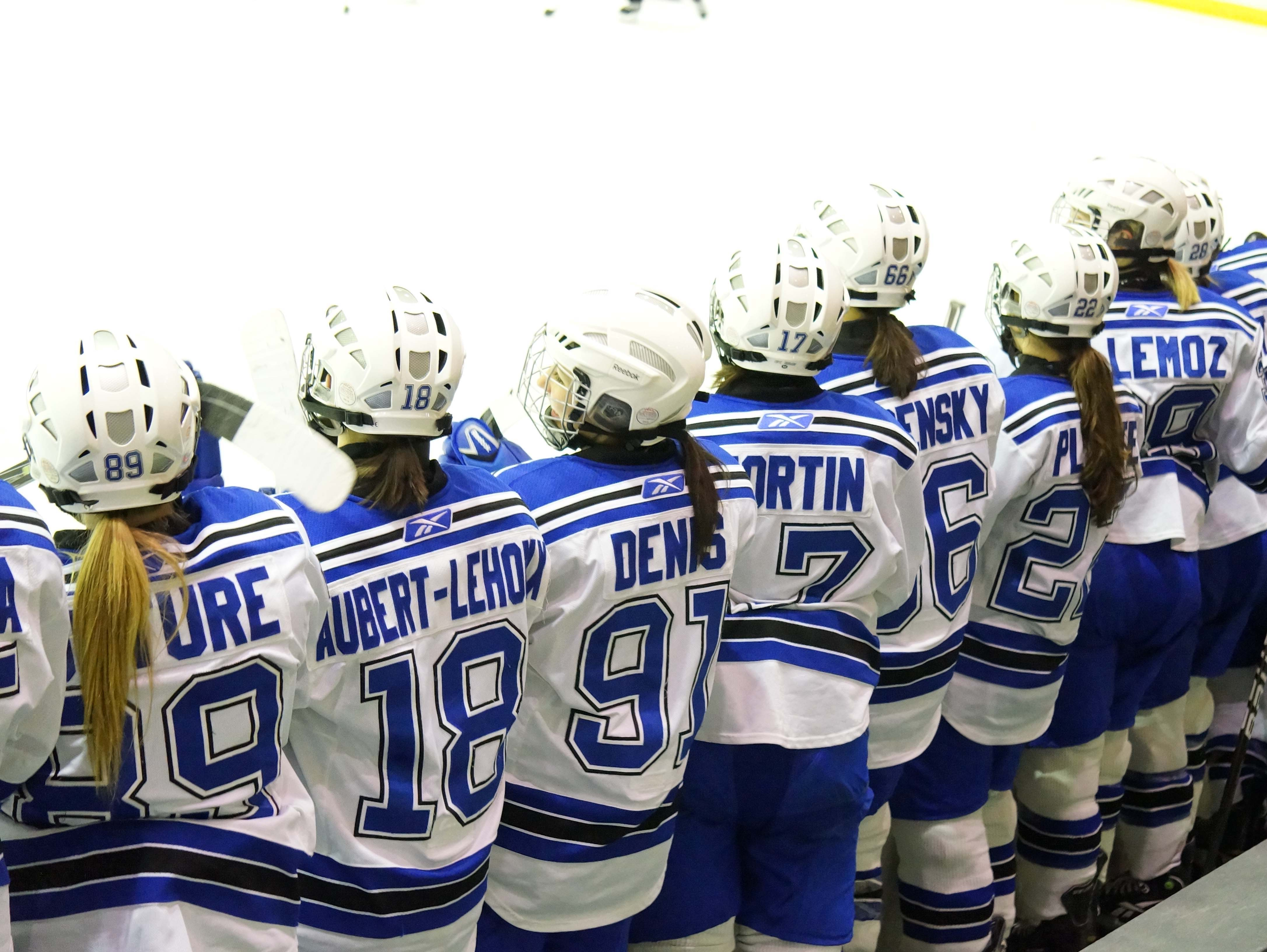
Montreal Carabins, January 29, 2012

The 2009-10 season was their first competing in CIS. The Carabins finished second during the regular season and claimed the fifth position in the CIS Canadian championship. In their second season (2010-11), the team ranked in second place in the Québécois conference behind McGill Martlets. In the 2011 playoffs, the Carabins eliminated the Concordia Stingers but the Carabins are in turn to eliminate in finale by McGill. In their second season, they did not qualify for the CIS Canadian championships.

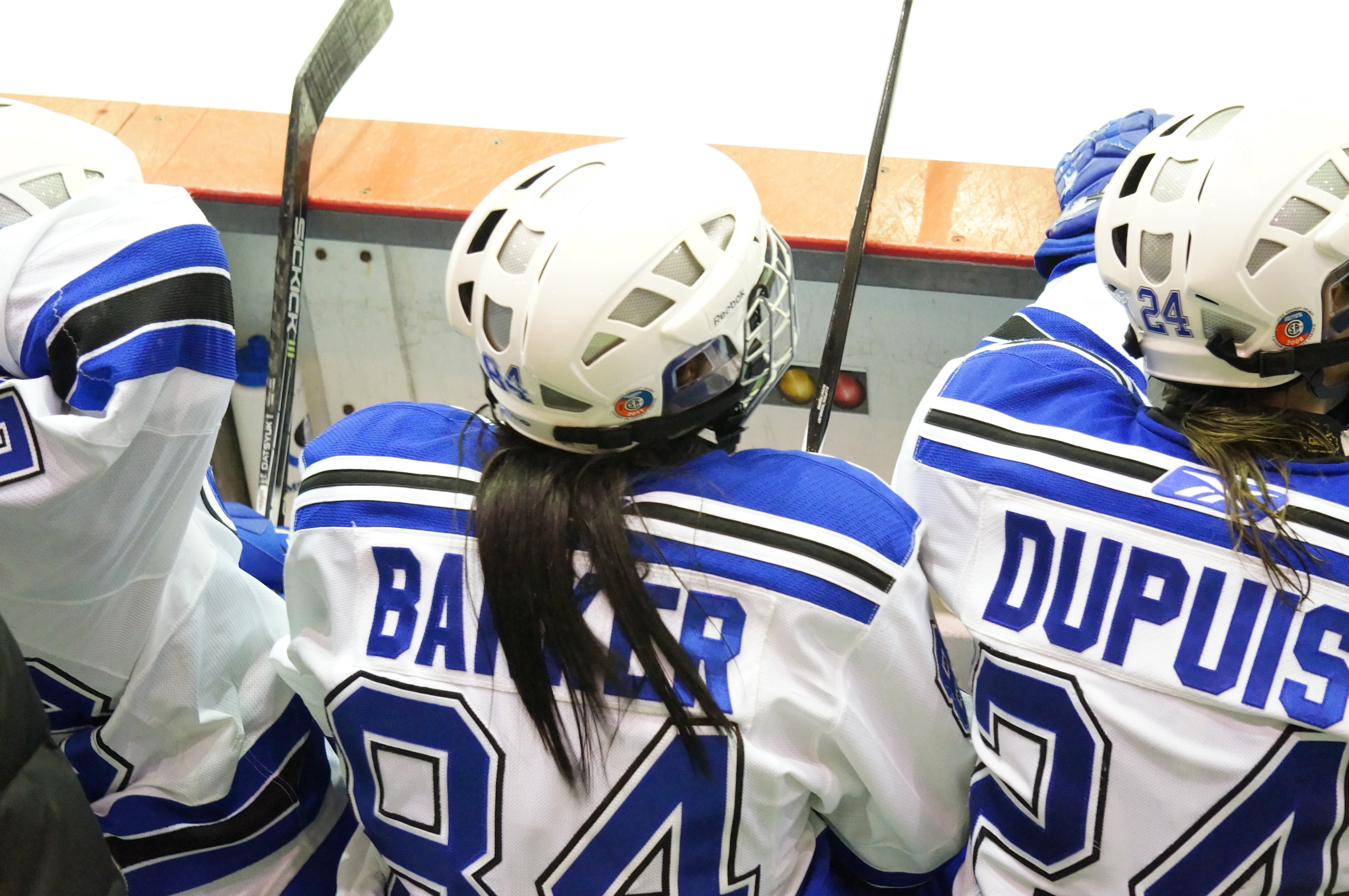
Ariane Barker and Casandra Dupuis

On October 29, 2011, Carabins skater Ariane Barker scored with 71 seconds left to give the squad a 3-2 win at McConnell Arena. Martlets goaltender Charline Labonte took the loss for the Martlets, giving her a 69-2 overall record in her CIS career. It marked the Martlets first loss to a Quebec conference opponent for the first time in 108 games.

In the 2011-12 season, the Carabins reach in finale national in their third season of existence only. The Carabins lose however in finale against Calgary Dinos. The Carabins women ice hockey team deserve the first medal of their young history (a Silver medal),

== Current Roster 2011-2012 ==
Goaltenders
Number		Player	Former Team	Hometown
31	(Canada)	Rachel Ouellette		Kirkland, Quebec
32	(Canada)	Marjorie Lessard	Dragons du Collège Laflèche	Nicolet, Quebec
35	(Canada)	Élodie Rousseau Sirois	Dragons du Collège Laflèche	Pohénégamook, Quebec

Defense
Number		Player	Former Team	Hometown
15	(Canada)	Élizabeth Mantha,	Ottawa Gee-Gees	Longueuil, Quebec
8	(Canada)	Janique Duval	Lynx du Collège Édouard-Montpetit women's ice hockey	Val-d'Or, Quebec
18	(Canada)	Édith Aubert-Lehoux	Dragons du Collège Laflèche	Ham-Nord, Quebec
19	(Canada)	Jessica Bond	Maine Black Bears women's ice hockey	LaSalle, Quebec
21	(Canada)	Sophie Brault	Lynx du Collège Édouard-Montpetit women's ice hockey	Saint-Jean-sur-Richelieu, Quebec
89	(Canada)	Marie-Ève Couture	Moncton Aigles Bleu	Trois-Rivières, Quebec
91	(Canada)	Vicky Denis		Gaspé, Quebec

Forwards
Number		Player	Former Team	Hometown
9	(Canada)	Kim Deschênes	Bathurst Northern Stars	Saint-Quentin, New Brunswick
17	(Canada)	Audrey Fortin	Lynx du Collège Édouard-Montpetit women's ice hockey	La Sarre, Quebec
22	(Canada)	Maxie Plante	Stanstead College	Sherbrooke, Quebec
24	(Canada)	Casandra Dupuis	Lynx du Collège Édouard-Montpetit women's ice hockey	Sherbrooke, Quebec
27	(Canada)	Jessica Gagné	Dragons du Collège Laflèche	Sherbrooke, Quebec
28	(Canada)	Josianne Legault	Dragons du Collège Laflèche	Granby, Quebec
39	(France)	Marion Allemoz	Pôle France féminin de Chambéry	Chambéry, France
40	(Canada)	Caroline Martin-Guay	Collège Jean-de-Brébeuf	Saint-Jean-sur-Richelieu, Quebec
64	(Canada)	Maude Gélinas	Lynx du Collège Édouard-Montpetit women's ice hockey	Montreal, Quebec
66	(Canada)	Mélissa Globensky	Cégep Marie-Victorin	Montreal, Quebec
94	(Canada)	Katia Murray	Dawson College Blues women's ice hockey	Montreal, Quebec
84	(Canada)	Ariane Barker	Lynx du Collège Édouard-Montpetit women's ice hockey	Napierville, Quebec

== Staff 2011-2012 ==
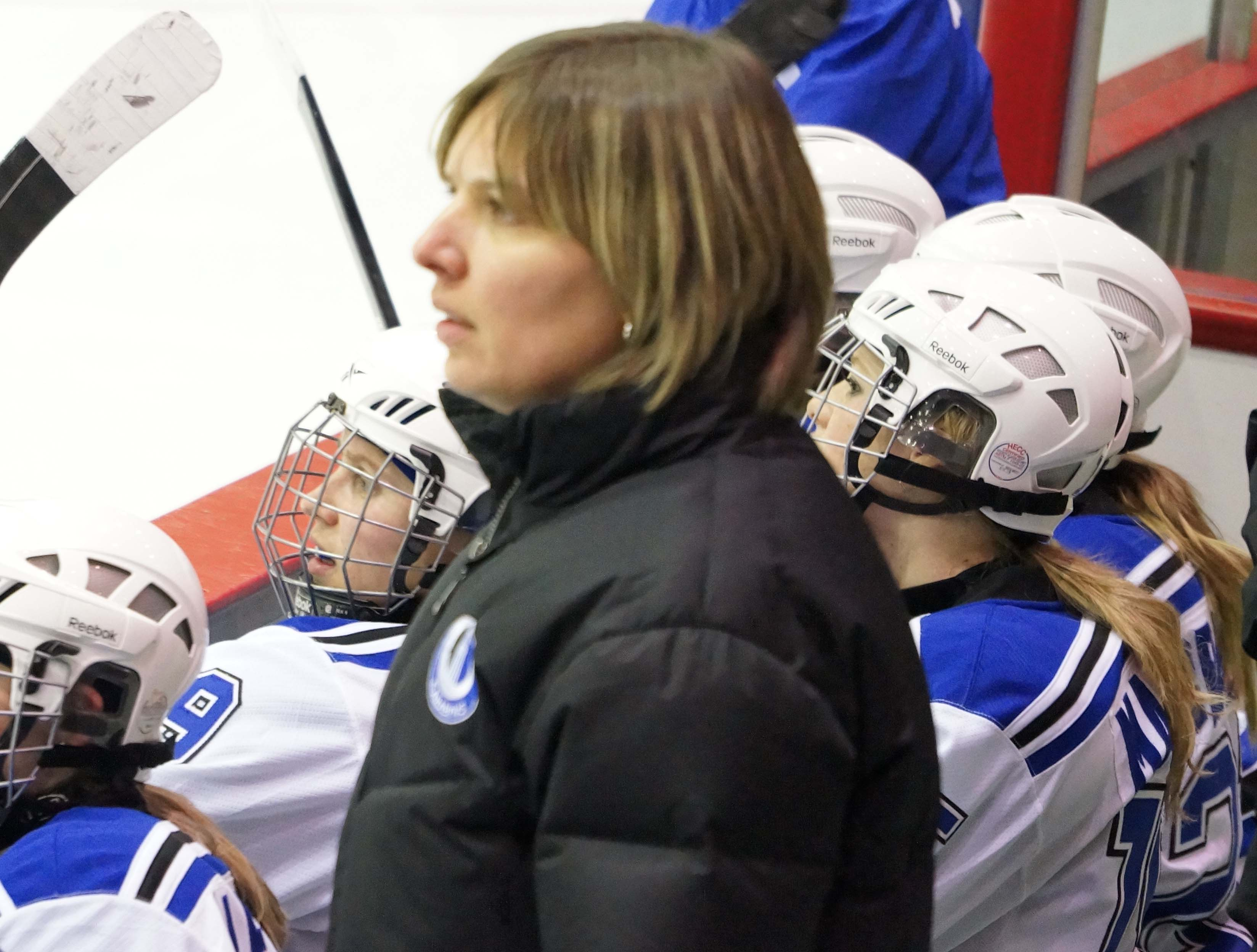
Head coach Isabelle Leclaire

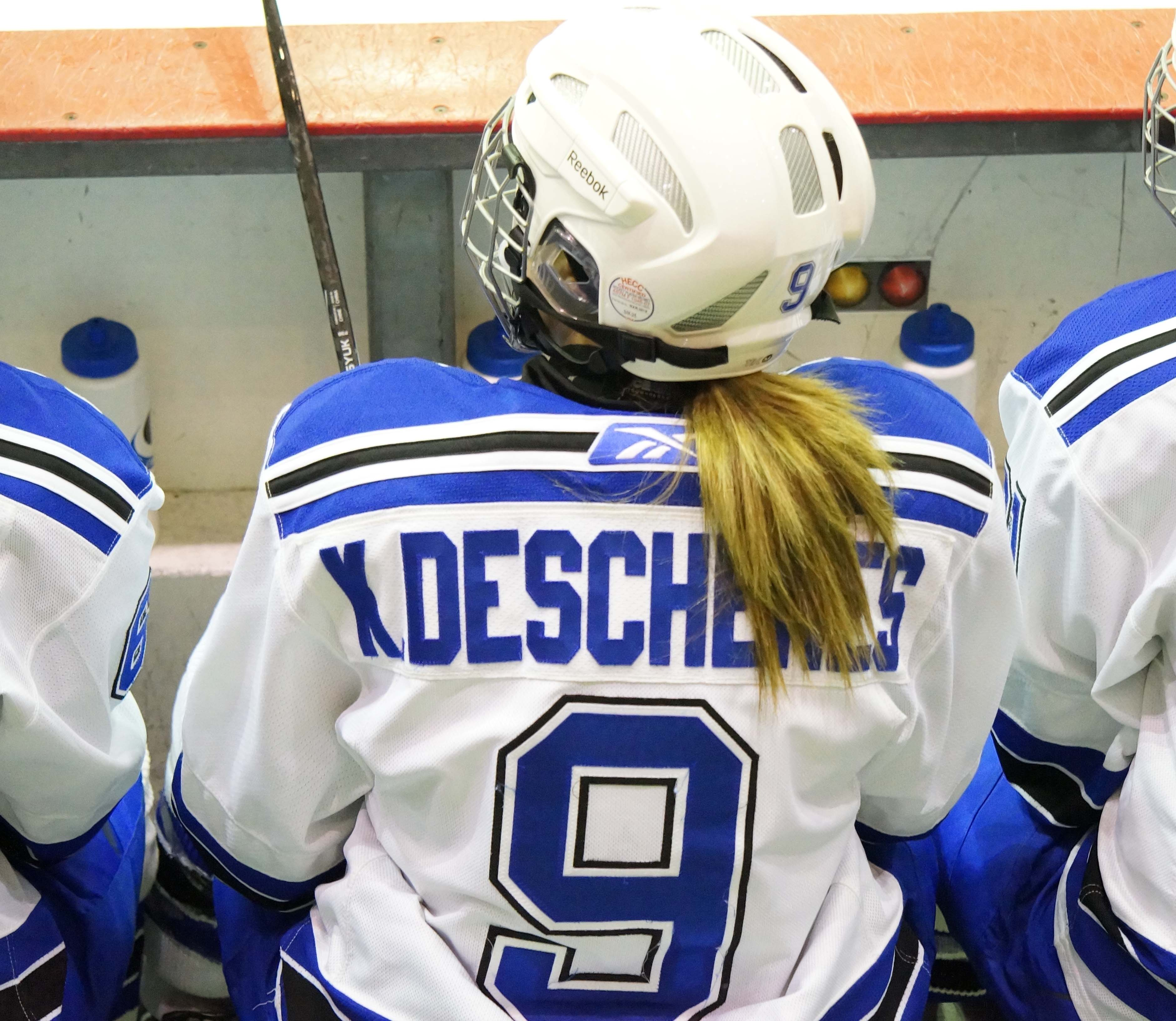
Kim Deschênes, captain of Montréal Carabins

- General manager Danièle Sauvageau
- Councillor-Adviser France St-Louis
- Head Coach: Isabelle Leclaire
- Assistant Coach: Brittany Privée
- Assistant Coach: Pascal Daoust
- Goaltender Coach: Nicolas Champagne

== Awards and honours ==
=== RSEQ Awards ===
- 2010 QSSF Rookie of the Year, Kim Deschênes
- 2014-15 RSEQ MOST OUTSTANDING PLAYER: Ariane Barker

==== RSEQ All-Stars ====
First Team

- 2009-10 QSSF First Team All-Star, Kim Deschênes, Forward
- 2009-10 QSSF First Team All-Star, Marie-Hélène Suc, Defence
- 2009-10 QSSF Second Team All-Star, Marie-Andrée Leclerc-Auger

After the 2010–11 season, Forwards Josianne Legault, Kim Deschênes, the Defencemen Stéphanie Daneau, Janique Duval and goaltender Rachel Ouellette were named to the All-Star teams of the league .

- 2014–15 RSEQ First Team All-Star: Ariane Barker
- 2014–15 RSEQ First Team All-Star: Élodie Rousseau-Sirois
- 2016–17 RSEQ First Team All-Stars: Jessica Cormier

Second Team

- 2014–15 RSEQ Second Team All-Star:Janique Duval
- 2016–17 RSEQ Second Team All-Stars: Maude Laramée

==== RSEQ All-Rookie ====
- 2014–15 RSEQ All-Rookie Team: Alexandra Paradis
- 2014–15 RSEQ All-Rookie Team: Jessica Cormier
- 2019–20 RSEQ All-Rookie Team: Annabel Faubert
- 2019-20 RSEQ ALL-ROOKIE TEAM: Joannie Garand

=== USports Awards ===
- Sophie Brault, 2012–13 USports Second Team All-Star
- Kelly-Ann Nadeau, 2023–24 USports Second Team All-Star

== International ==
- Kim Deschênes Canada: 2011 Winter Universiade
- Élodie Rousseau-Sirois Canada: 2015 Winter Universiade (gold)
- Ariane Barker Canada: 2015 Winter Universiade (silver)
- Élizabeth Mantha Canada: 2015 Winter Universiade (silver)
- Jessica Cormier, ForwardCanada: 2017 Winter Universiade (silver)
- Catherine Dubois, ForwardCanada: 2017 Winter Universiade (silver)
- Alexandra Labelle, ForwardCanada: 2017 Winter Universiade (silver)
- Maude Laramée, Defense Canada: 2017 Winter Universiade (silver)
- Annabel Faubert Canada: Ice hockey at the 2019 Winter Universiade (silver)

== Carabins in professional hockey ==
= CWHL All-Star	= NWHL All-Star	= Clarkson Cup Champion	= Isobel Cup Champion

Player	Position	Team(s)	League(s)	Years	Titles
Marion Allemoz	Forward	Canadiennes de Montreal; MODO	CWHL; SDHL		2017 Clarkson Cup
Sophie Brault	Forward	Canadiennes de Montreal; Dream Gap Tour	CWHL; PWHPA	6	2017 Clarkson Cup
Kim Deschenes	Forward	Canadiennes de Montreal; Dream Gap Tour	CWHL; PWHPA	5	2017 Clarkson Cup
Athena Locatelli	Forward	HIFK	Naisten Liiga		
Kelly-Ann Nadeau	Defence	Montreal Victoire	PWHL		

== See also ==
- 2009–10 Montreal Carabins women's ice hockey season
- 2010–11 Montreal Carabins women's ice hockey season
- Montreal Carabins
- Canadian Interuniversity Sport women's ice hockey championship
