= 2016 CIS Women's Ice Hockey Championship =

Canadian university ice hockey championship

- Season: 2015-16
- Teams: Eight
- Finals site: Markin MacPhail Centre; Joan Snyder Arena; Calgary, Alberta
- Champions: Montreal Carabins (2nd title)
- Runner-up: UBC Thunderbirds
- Winning coach: Isabelle Leclaire (2nd title)
- MVP: Marie-Pier Chabot (Montreal Carabins)
- Television: Sportsnet 360; TVA Sports

The 2016 CIS Women's Ice Hockey Championship was held from March 17–20, 2016, in Calgary, Alberta, to determine a national champion for the 2015–16 CIS women's ice hockey season. The bronze medal game between Saint Mary's and Guelph was held at the Joan Snyder Arena, while the remainder of the tournament was contested at Markin MacPhail Arena on the campus of the University of Calgary. Montreal’s Alexandra Labelle recorded a hat trick in the gold medal game, part of an 8-0 shutout triumph versus the UBC Thunderbirds.

== Participating teams ==
Seed	Team	Qualified	Record
1	Guelph Gryphons	OUA champions	21–2–1
2	Montreal Carabins	RSEQ champions	15–3–2
3	Saint Mary's Huskies	AUS champions	17–6–1
4	UBC Thunderbirds	Canada West champions	16–9–3
5	McGill Martlets	RSEQ finalists	13–5–2
6	Western Mustangs	OUA finalists	15–8–1
7	Calgary Dinos	Canada West quarterfinals (Host)	12–12–4
8	St. Thomas Tommies	AUS finalists	16–7–1

== Championship Bracket ==
First Round: March 17/18
2	Montreal	4
7	Calgary	0
3	Saint Mary's	1
6	Western	0
1	Guelph	3
8	St. Thomas	0
4	UBC	4
5	McGill	2

Semi-Finals: March 19
2	Montreal	3
3	Saint Mary's	2
4	UBC	2
1	Guelph	1

Gold Medal Game: March 20
2	Montreal	8
4	UBC	0
Bronze Medal Game: March 20
1	Guelph	1
3	Saint Mary's	3

== Consolation Bracket ==
Semi-Finals: March 18/19
7	Calgary	3
6	Western	1
8	St. Thomas	2
5	McGill	1

Fifth Place Game: March 20
7	Calgary	4
8	St. Thomas	0

== Awards and honours ==
- Tournament most valuable player: Marie-Pier Chabot, Montreal

=== Players of the Game ===
Game	Players	Teams
March 16: Saint Mary's vs. Western	Caitlyn Schell; Katelyn Gosling	Saint Mary's; Western
March 17: Guelph vs. St. Thomas	Averi Nooren; Taylor Cook	Guelph; St. Thomas
March 18: McGill vs. St. Thomas	Olivia Sutter; Kelty Apperson	McGill; St. Thomas
March 19: Montreal vs. Saint Mary's	Ariane Barker; Breanna Lanceleve	Montreal; Saint Mary's
March 20: Saint Mary's vs. Guelph	Rebecca Clark; Leigh Shilton	Saint Mary's; Guelph
March 20: Calgary vs. St. Thomas	Hayley Dowling; Myfanwy Thomson	Calgary; St. Thomas
March 20: Montreal vs. UBC	Marie-Pier Chabot; Kathleen Cahoon	Montreal; UBC

=== All-Tournament Team ===
Player	Position	Team
Marie Chabot	Goaltender	Montreal
Kelly Murray	Defense	UBC
Katelyn Gosling	Defense	Western
Iya Gavrilova	Forward	Calgary
Ariane Barker	Forward	Montreal
Catherine Dubois	Forward	Montreal
