= Danièle Sauvageau =

Canadian ice hockey coach (born 1962)

Danièle Sauvageau OC MSC
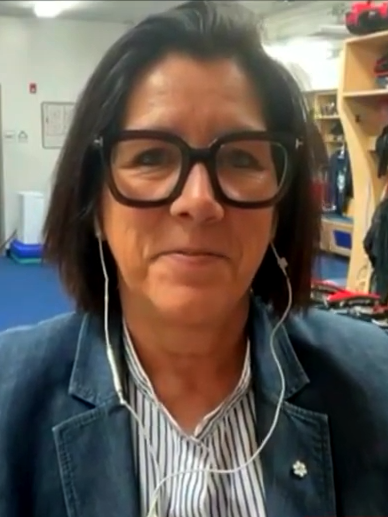
- Sauvageau in 2023
- Born: April 22, 1962 (age 64); Deux-Montagnes, Quebec, Canada
- Occupation: Ice hockey executive/coach
- Awards: Hockey Hall of Fame Class of 2025 (Builder)

Danièle Sauvageau OC MSC (French pronunciation: [danjɛl sovaʒo]; born April 22, 1962) is a Canadian ice hockey executive and former coach. Sauvageau was the head coach of the Canadian national women's hockey team that won the gold medal in ice hockey at the 2002 Winter Olympics. Sauvageau was inducted into the Hockey Hall of Fame in 2025 as a builder.

== Police career ==
Originally from Deux-Montagnes, Quebec, Sauvageau served as a police officer with the Royal Canadian Mounted Police and the Service de police de la Ville de Montréal for 33 years. According to Sauvageau, she "dealt with everything as a police officer and investigator (911, drugs, morality, surveillance, strategic development, etc." including being part of the responses to the École Polytechnique massacre and 2006 Dawson College shooting.

== Hockey career ==
Sauvageau was the head coach for the Ferland Quatre Glaces (first based out of Brossard, and then Repentigny) team in the League Régionale du Hockey au Féminin in the province of Québec. When the Canadian Under-19 women's hockey team was founded on May 15, 1996, Danièle Sauvageau was the head coach. Two future Olympians played for her: Caroline Ouellette and speed skater Cindy Klassen. She was assistant coach during the 1998 Olympic Games where Canada finished with silver. Sauvageau was named head coach of Canada's National Women's Hockey Team for the 2001 World Hockey Championship and the 2002 Winter Olympics on June 22, 2000. As head coach of the first Canadian Olympic hockey team to win gold in 50 years, Sauvageau became a Canadian hero.

Sauvageau has worked at almost every level of hockey open to female coaches. After the disappointing silver medal showing at the 1998 Winter Olympics in Nagano, Sauvageau was named the new head coach of the team and general manager of the Canadian female hockey program. Following eight straight losses to the U.S. team prior to the Olympics, her team-building methods and leadership skills led the team to a gold medal in 2002.

In 1999–2000, she became an assistant coach for the Montreal Rocket of the QMJHL. She was the first female coach in QMJHL history. Sauvageau was the first female NHL Saturday Night Hockey TV analyst for Canada's French station Télévision de Radio-Canada and is the new official spokesperson for the Coaching Association of Canada. She was a member of the successful bid committee for the Vancouver 2010 Olympic bid.

As part of the IIHF Ambassador and Mentor Program, Sauvageau was a Hockey Canada coaching mentor that travelled to Bratislava, Slovakia to participate in the 2011 IIHF High Performance Women's Camp from July 4 to 12.

As of 2010, she was the general manager of the Montreal Carabins women's ice hockey program. In 2018 coached Les Canadiennes de Montreal of the CWHL to the Clarkson Cup Final. In 2021, she also served as general manager and coach of the Montreal team in the Professional Women's Hockey Players Association. Sauvageau was named the general manager of the Montreal Victoire team in the Professional Women's Hockey League (PWHL) in 2023.

== Education ==
She is a graduate of the Université de Montréal and of the RCMP Academy, Depot Division. She was a sergeant in the Service de police de la Ville de Montréal (City of Montreal Police Service).

== Awards and honours ==
- Sauvageau received an Honorary Doctorate of Civil Law (DCL) from Saint Mary's University (Halifax. N.S.) in October 2002 for her leadership in international athletics
- In 2004, she was awarded the Meritorious Service Cross (civil division).
- In 2008, Sauvageau was inducted into the Canadian Olympic Hall of Fame.
- She was made an Officer of the Order of Canada (OC) as per Canada Gazette of 6 July 2013.
- 2021 Hockey Canada Female Breakthrough Award

Ribbon	Description	Notes
	Order of Canada (OC)	Officer; 3 May 2013
	Meritorious Service Cross (MSC)	Awarded 26 April 2004; Civil Division
	Queen Elizabeth II Golden Jubilee Medal	6 February 2002; Canadian Version of this Medal
	Queen Elizabeth II Diamond Jubilee Medal	6 February 2012; Canadian Version of this Medal
	Police Exemplary Service Medal	20 Years of Service with a Municipal or Provincial Police Force; 22 June 2012
