= St. Thomas University (Canada) =

Small liberal arts university in Fredericton, New Brunswick, Canada

Coordinates: 45°56′37.18″N 66°38′48.40″W

- Former name: St. Thomas College (1910–1960)
- Motto: Doce Bonitatem Scientiam et Disciplinam (Latin)
- Motto in English: Teach me Goodness and Knowledge and Discipline
- Type: Public
- Established: 1910; 116 years ago
- Religious affiliation: Roman Catholic
- Academic affiliations: UACC; CUP; CUSID; ICUSTA
- Chancellor: Hon. Graydon Nicholas
- President: M. Nauman Farooqi
- Visitor: Christian Riesbeck (as Bishop of Saint John)
- Students: 1,783 (Fall 2026)
- Undergraduates: 1,734
- Postgraduates: 49
- Location: Fredericton, New Brunswick, Canada
- Campus: Urban
- Colours: Gold and Green
- Nickname: Tommies
- Sporting affiliations: U Sports - AUS; CCAA - ACAA
- Website: stu.ca

St. Thomas University (also St. Thomas or STU) is a Roman Catholic, English-language liberal arts university located in Fredericton, New Brunswick, Canada. It is a primarily undergraduate university, offering bachelor degrees to approximately 1,700 students. St. Thomas is also home to The Atlantic Human Rights Centre and the Frank McKenna Centre for Communications and Public Policy.

== History ==
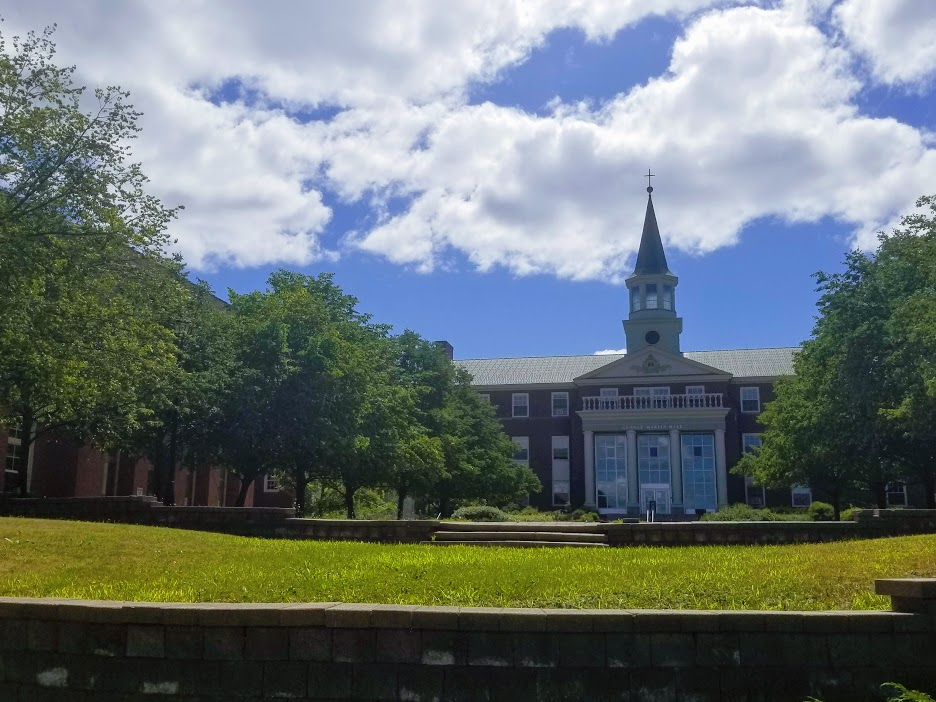
STU's lower campus in Fredericton

St. Thomas University acknowledges the land in which the school is built on as traditional territory of Indigenous communities. These communities include the Wolastoqiyik / Maliseet, and the Mi'Kmaw, and Passamaquoddy / Peskotomuhkati Tribes / Nations, who signed peace treaties with the British Crown in the 1700s.

St. Thomas University traces its institutional origins to the establishment of a Catholic academy in the former community of Chatham, New Brunswick (now Miramichi) in the late nineteenth century. Due to an influx of Irish immigration in northwestern New Brunswick, Chatham saw a need for more centers of education and religious instruction. Officially opened in October 1860, St. Michael's Academy was inaugurated by Bishop James Rogers of the newly formed Diocese of Chatham.

St. Michael's Academy catered to young English-speaking males in the Miramichi River Valley and the growing port town of Chatham. A women's academy was created a year later. St. Michael's consisted of a single wooden structure constructed near the seat of the Diocese of Chatham, the new St. Michael's Cathedral. The institution offered a classical education and was intended to prepare students to study for the diocesan priesthood. From 1865, the school was known as St. Michael's College. It closed for several years in the 1870s and 1880s.

Its uneven operation was curbed by the Basilian Fathers, a religious order who assumed the administration of the College in 1910. Since the Toronto-based religious order already had a Catholic college in the Ontario capital, named St. Michael's College (a federated component of the University of Toronto), St. Michael's in Chatham was renamed St. Thomas College after Thomas Aquinas. It remained a high school and a junior college; however, in 1934, the institution gained degree-granting status from the Government of New Brunswick.

After 1923, the Basilian Fathers transferred the administration of the college to the Diocese of Chatham. The diocese was restructured as the Diocese of Bathurst. Its seat was moved to the primarily francophone community, Bathurst, north of Chatham. While St. Thomas College remained in Chatham, its future remained uncertain. In 1959, the college was subject to territorial changes in the reorganized Diocese of Bathurst. English-speaking parishes and the college were transferred to the Diocese of Saint John with its seat in New Brunswick's major port city. The Bishop of Saint John became the Chancellor of St. Thomas. By mid-century, the economic and social significance of post-secondary institutions saw an increased role of state intervention. In 1960, the institution was renamed St. Thomas University by an act of the New Brunswick Legislature. Under the government of Louis Robichaud, the Royal Commission on Higher Education was launched. Headed by John James Deutsch, a professor and administrator from Queen's University, the commission recommended greater centralization and public funding in post-secondary education.

Arising from the Commission's recommendations, St. Thomas University was encouraged to relocate to the campus of the University of New Brunswick in Fredericton to share facilities. Not without controversy and animosity, St. Thomas University moved to the provincial capital and abandoned its secondary school curriculum. A new campus was built in the Neo-Georgian style by the architects of the University of New Brunswick (Larson & Larson) to complement the campus of its institutional neighbour. It officially welcomed students in October 1964.

== Relationship with UNB ==
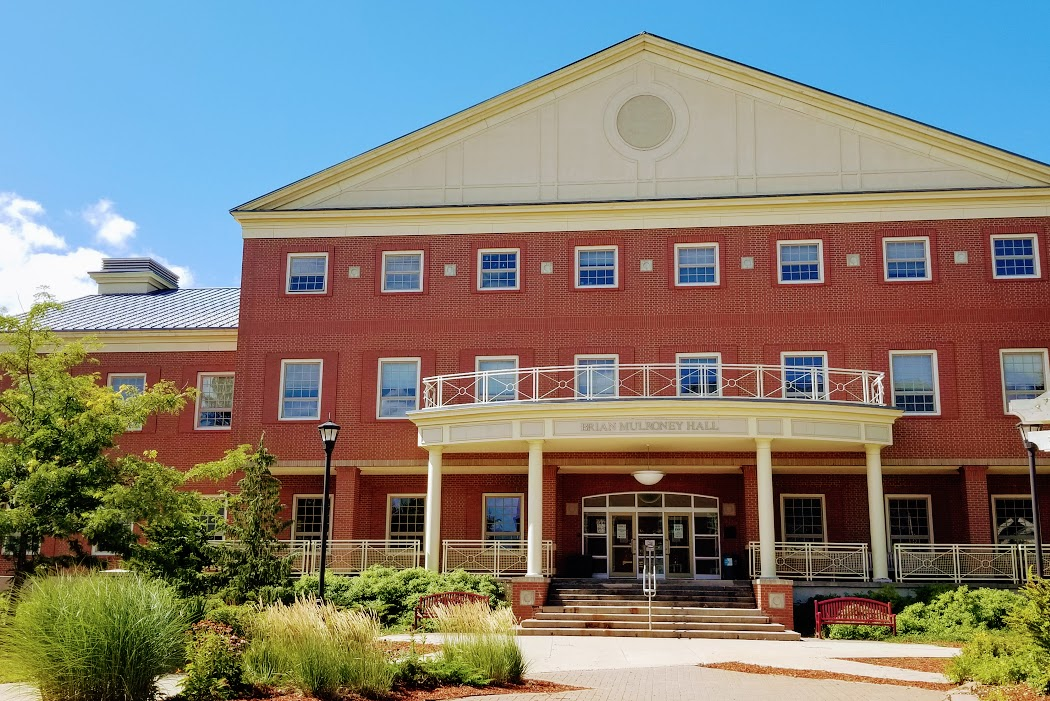
Brian Mulroney Hall

St. Thomas University and the University of New Brunswick's Fredericton campus are located in the College Hill neighbourhood in Fredericton. The two institutions share facilities for their student unions, libraries, athletics, and a common heating plant and building maintenance services. Students from STU are permitted to take a certain number of classes at UNB and vice versa. However, STU and UNBF itself are financially and academically separate. STU is able to offer many amenities other smaller schools cannot, in large part to its UNB partnership. The two universities enjoy a good-natured rivalry.

== Academics ==
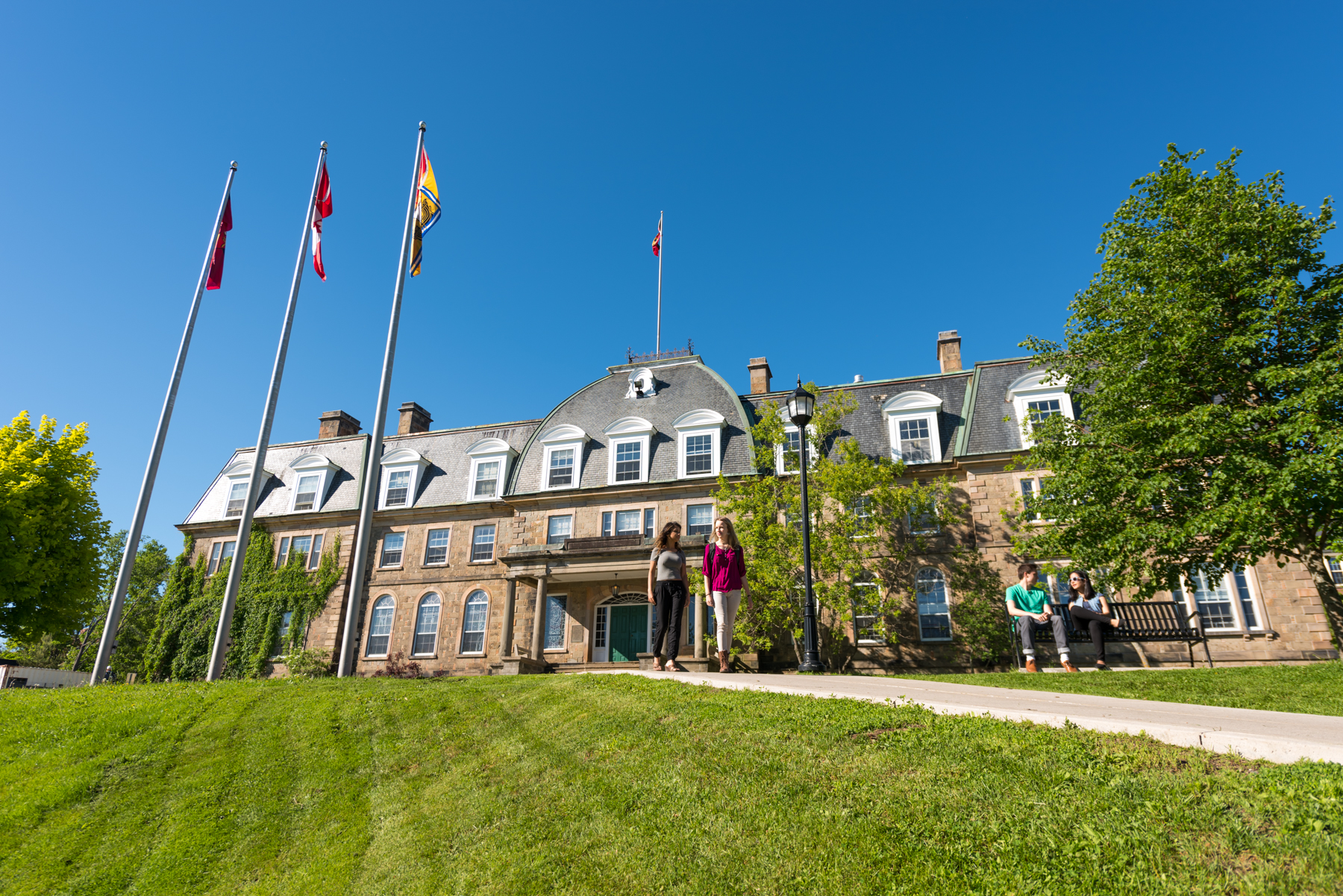
Now sharing a campus with the University of New Brunswick (pictured), STU relocated to Fredericton from Chatham, New Brunswick in 1964

STU offers the following programs: Bachelor of Arts, Bachelor of Applied Arts, Bachelor of Education, Bachelor of Social Work, and a Bachelor of Arts Aviation Stream.

== Athletics ==
The STU Tommies compete in men's and women's basketball, cross-country, soccer, and volleyball, as well as women's rugby and hockey. Collectively, the Tommies have won 43 ACAA titles and 3 AUS titles. Student-athletes have achieved 459 CCAA National Scholar and 442 U Sports Academic All-Canadian awards.

STU participated in AUS men's hockey until 2016 (winning the championships in 1961 and 2001), and men's and women's track and field from 2011-2022.

== Campus life ==
There are six academic buildings on campus, housing classrooms and faculty offices: James Dunn Hall, Edmund Casey Hall, George Martin Hall, Brian Mulroney Hall, Holy Cross House, and Margaret Norrie McCain Hall. Donald C. Duffy Hall is home to the Admissions and Recruitment office, and has a store for merchandise. Additionally, there are three residence buildings at St. Thomas University, all located on campus: Harrington Hall, Vanier Hall, and Holy Cross House.

The university maintains its own campus police force, composed of students hired annually by the University to maintain security at campus events. The student newspaper, The Aquinian, is available on campus and throughout the city during the regular academic year.

== Notable alumni ==
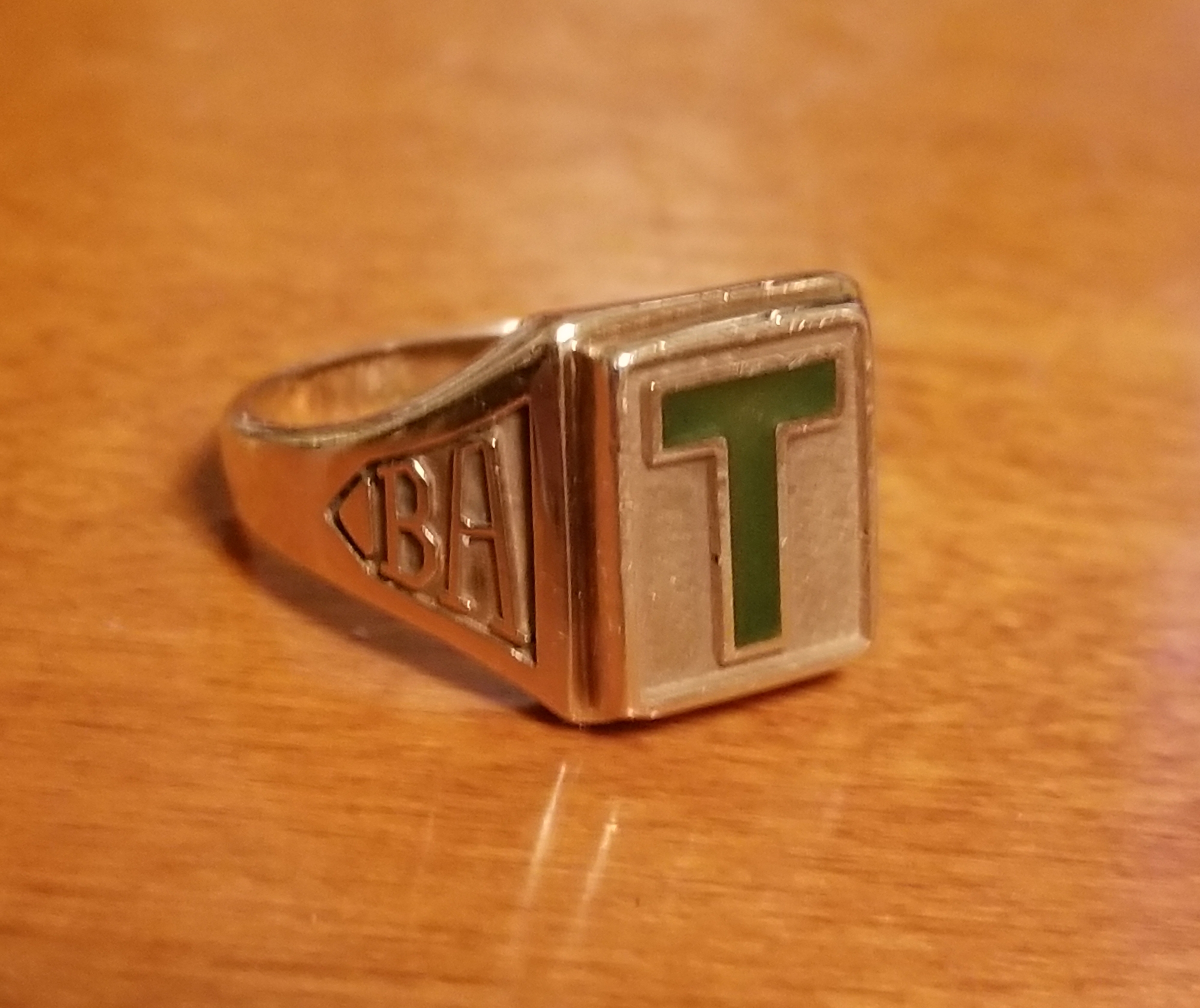
Graduates may choose to wear the traditional T-ring

- Kelty Apperson – former professional hockey player
- Guy Arseneault – New Brunswick MLA and former Member of Parliament
- Lewis C. Ayles – former New Brunswick MLA and justice of the Court of Appeal of New Brunswick
- Daniel Joseph Bohan – former Archbishop of the Archdiocese of Regina
- Frank Branch – former Speaker of the Legislative Assembly of New Brunswick
- Helen Branswell – journalist
- Greg Byrne – former New Brunswick MLA and cabinet minister
- Roger Clinch – former Member of Parliament
- Chris Collins – former Speaker of the Legislative Assembly of New Brunswick
- Rene Comeau – curler
- Ivan Court – former Mayor of Saint John, New Brunswick
- Matt DeCourcey – Former Member of Parliament
- James Doyle – former New Brunswick MLA
- Sheree Fitch – author and poet
- Harry Forestell – journalist
- Raymond Fraser – author
- Shawn Graham – former Premier of New Brunswick
- Steve Hicks – mayor of Fredericton, New Brunswick
- James M. Hill – former President of St. Thomas College and bishop of the Diocese of Victoria
- Stephen Horsman – former New Brunswick MLA and cabinet minister
- Garth Joy – National Hockey League scout and former professional hockey player
- Al Kavanaugh – former New Brunswick MLA
- J. Fraser Kerr – former New Brunswick MLA
- Carl Killen – former New Brunswick MLA
- Serge Langis – professional basketball coach
- Kelly Lamrock – former New Brunswick MLA and cabinet minister
- Carolyn Layden-Stevenson – former Justice of the Federal Court of Appeal
- Claudius Léger – former judge and New Brunswick MLA
- Paul Lordon – former New Brunswick MLA
- David Lutz – lawyer
- Sandra Lovelace Nicholas – former Senator
- George W. Martin – former President of St. Thomas University
- Joseph R. Martin – former New Brunswick MLA and Mayor of Chatham, New Brunswick
- Frederic McGrand – former Speaker of the Legislative Assembly of New Brunswick and Senator
- J. Killeen McKee – former judge and New Brunswick MLA
- Michael McKee – former judge, New Brunswick MLA, and cabinet minister
- Ralph McInerney – former New Brunswick MLA
- Cindy Miles – New Brunswick MLA and cabinet minister
- Brian Mulroney – former Prime Minister of Canada (alumnus of St. Thomas College, Chatham)
- Joseph Leonard O'Brien – former Speaker of the Legislative Assembly of New Brunswick, Member of Parliament, and Lieutenant Governor of New Brunswick
- Jason O'Leary – professional ice hockey coach
- Candy Palmater – Mi'kmaq lawyer, comedian, and activist
- Al Pittman – poet and playwright
- David Adams Richards – former Senator, author, and screenwriter
- Bernard Riordon – Director Emeritus of the Beaverbrook Art Gallery and past director of the Art Gallery of Nova Scotia
- Carmel Robichaud – former New Brunswick MLA and cabinet minister
- Anna Silk – actress
- Jake Stewart – former New Brunswick MLA, Member of Parliament, and provincial cabinet minister
- Greg Thompson – former New Brunswick MLA, Member of Parliament, and provincial and federal cabinet minister
- Lyman Ward – actor
- Doug Young – former New Brunswick MLA, Member of Parliament, provincial and federal cabinet minister, and leader of the Liberal Party of New Brunswick
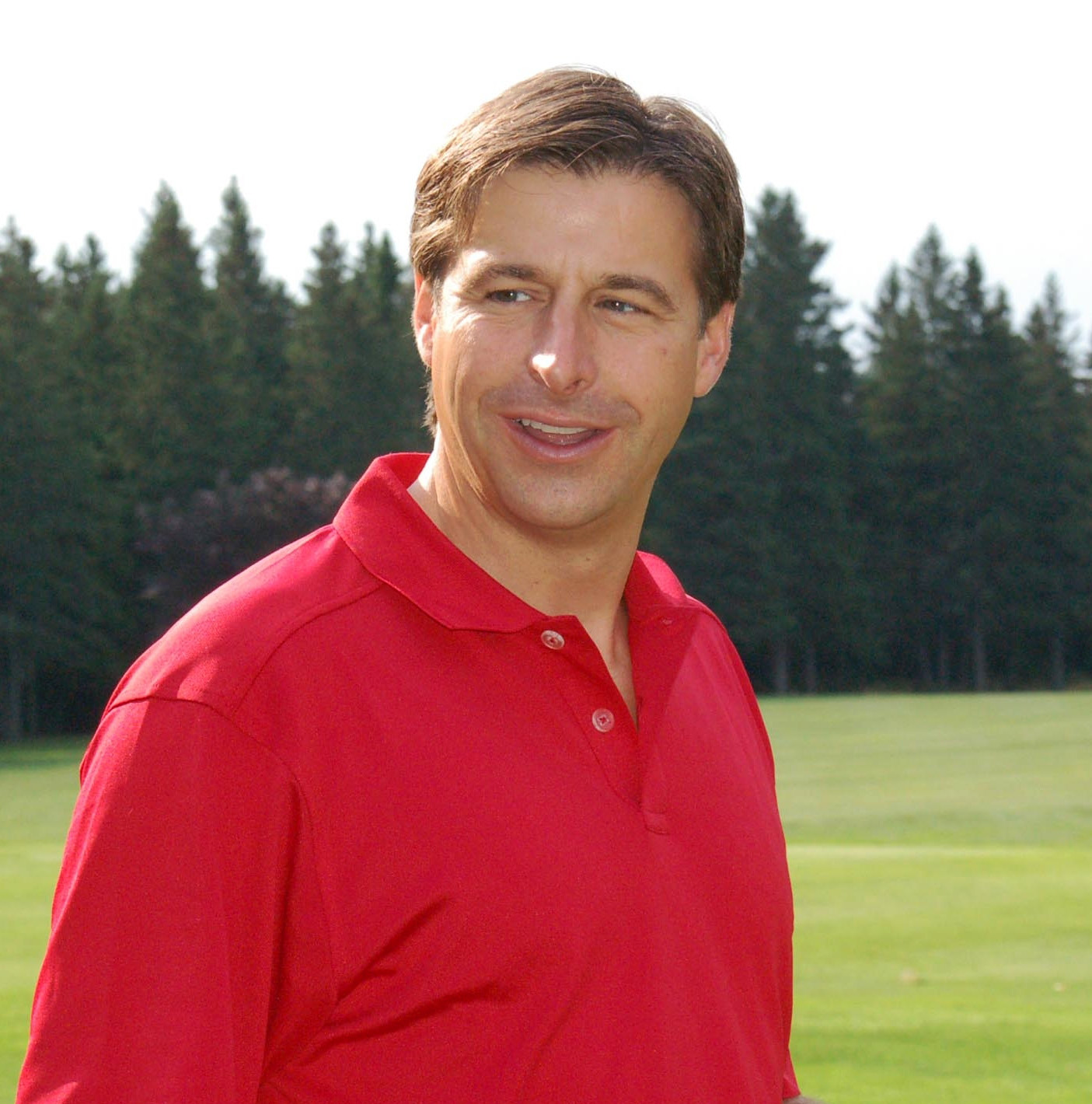
Shawn Graham, former Premier of New Brunswick

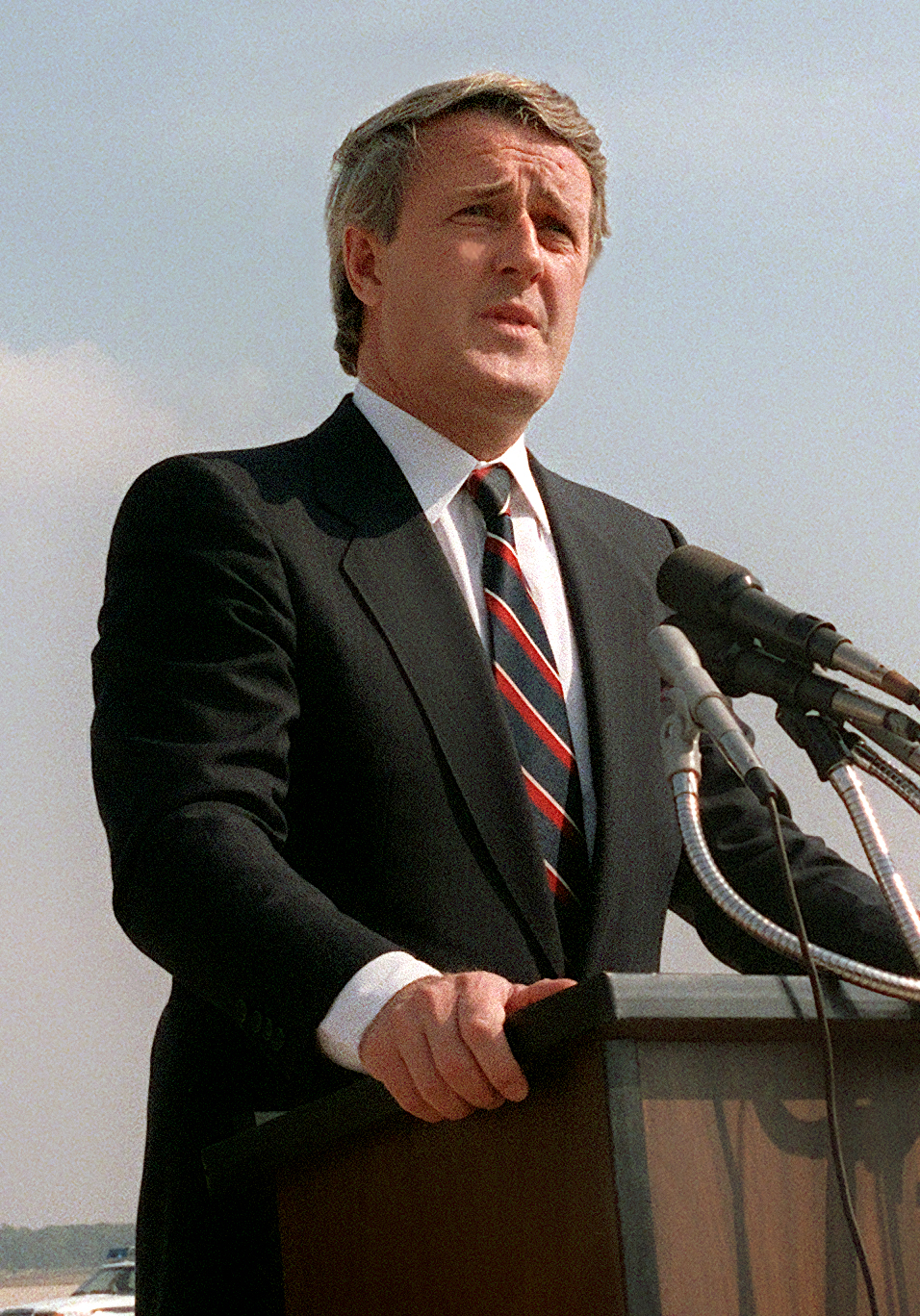
Brian Mulroney, former Prime Minister of Canada

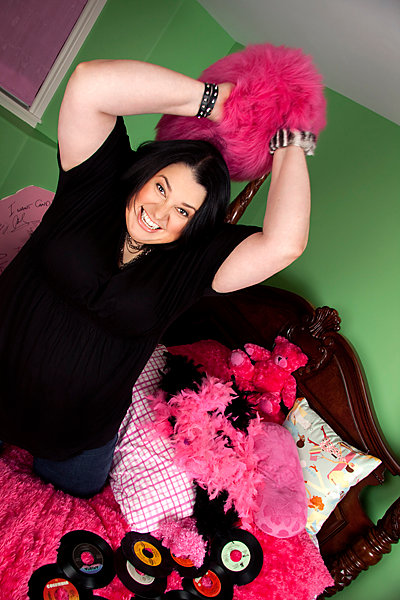
Candy Palmater, Miꞌkmaq lawyer, comedian, and activist

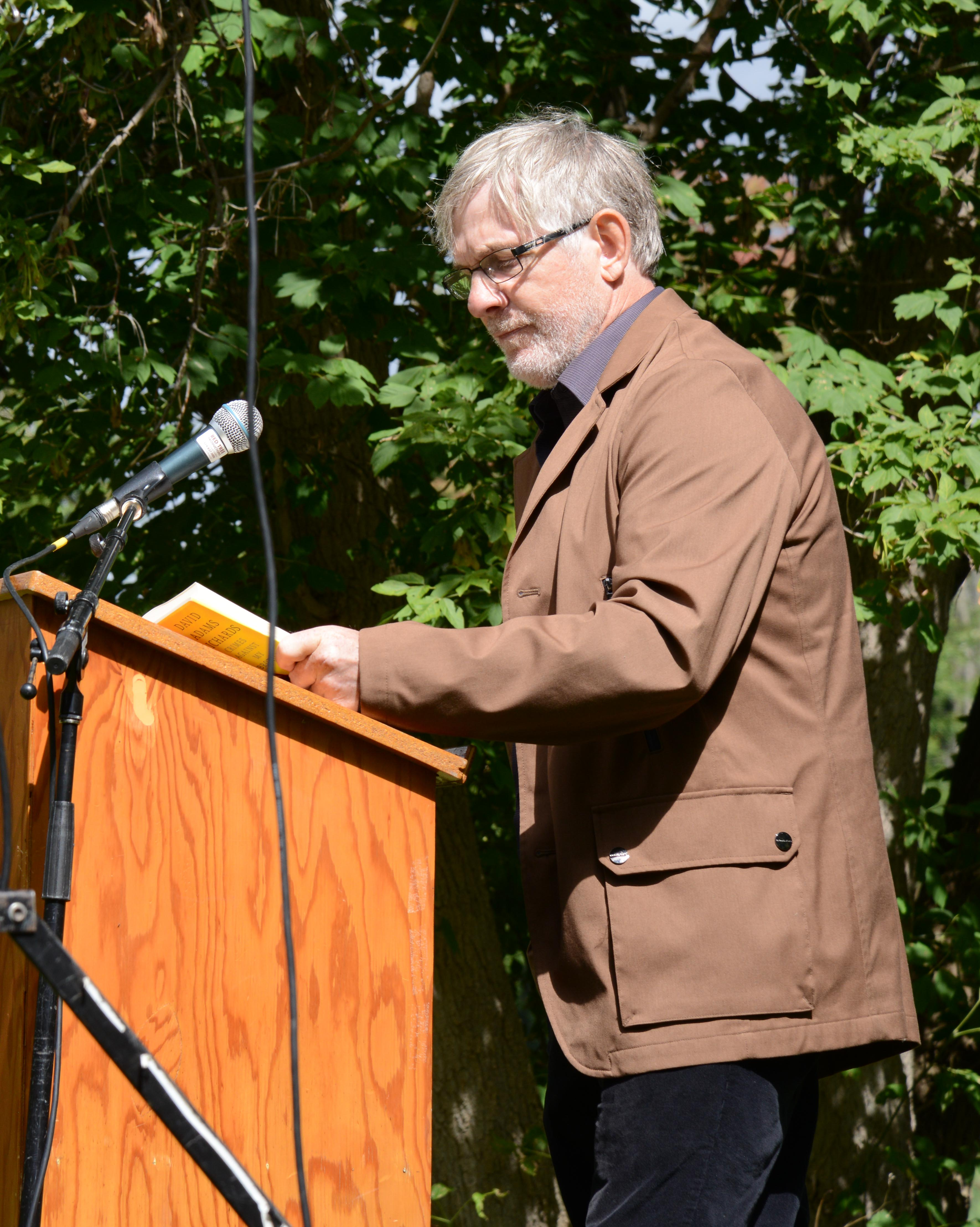
David Adams Richards, author and former Senator, author, and screenwriter

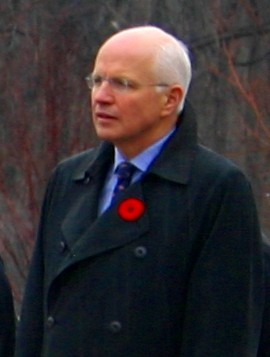
Greg Thompson, former provincial and federal cabinet minister

== Notable faculty and staff ==
- T.J. Burke - first Indigenous person elected to a legislative assembly in Atlantic Canada and former Attorney General of New Brunswick
- Mike Eagles – former NHL hockey player
- Noël Kinsella – former Speaker of the Senate of Canada
- Kelly Lamrock – former provincial cabinet minister and Attorney General of New Brunswick
- Graydon Nicholas – first Indigenous Lieutenant Governor of New Brunswick, former judge, and first Indigenous law graduate from Atlantic Canada
- David Adams Richards – former writer-in-residence
- Jan Wong – journalist and author
- Shannonbrooke Murphy - Author of The Human Right to Resist in International and Constitutional Law

== See also ==
- Higher education in New Brunswick
- List of universities in New Brunswick
- Atlantic University Sport
- Canadian Interuniversity Sport
- The Thomists (21-piece big band based at the university)
