= List of Minnesota Golden Gophers women's ice hockey seasons =

Seasons of American women's collegiate hockey team

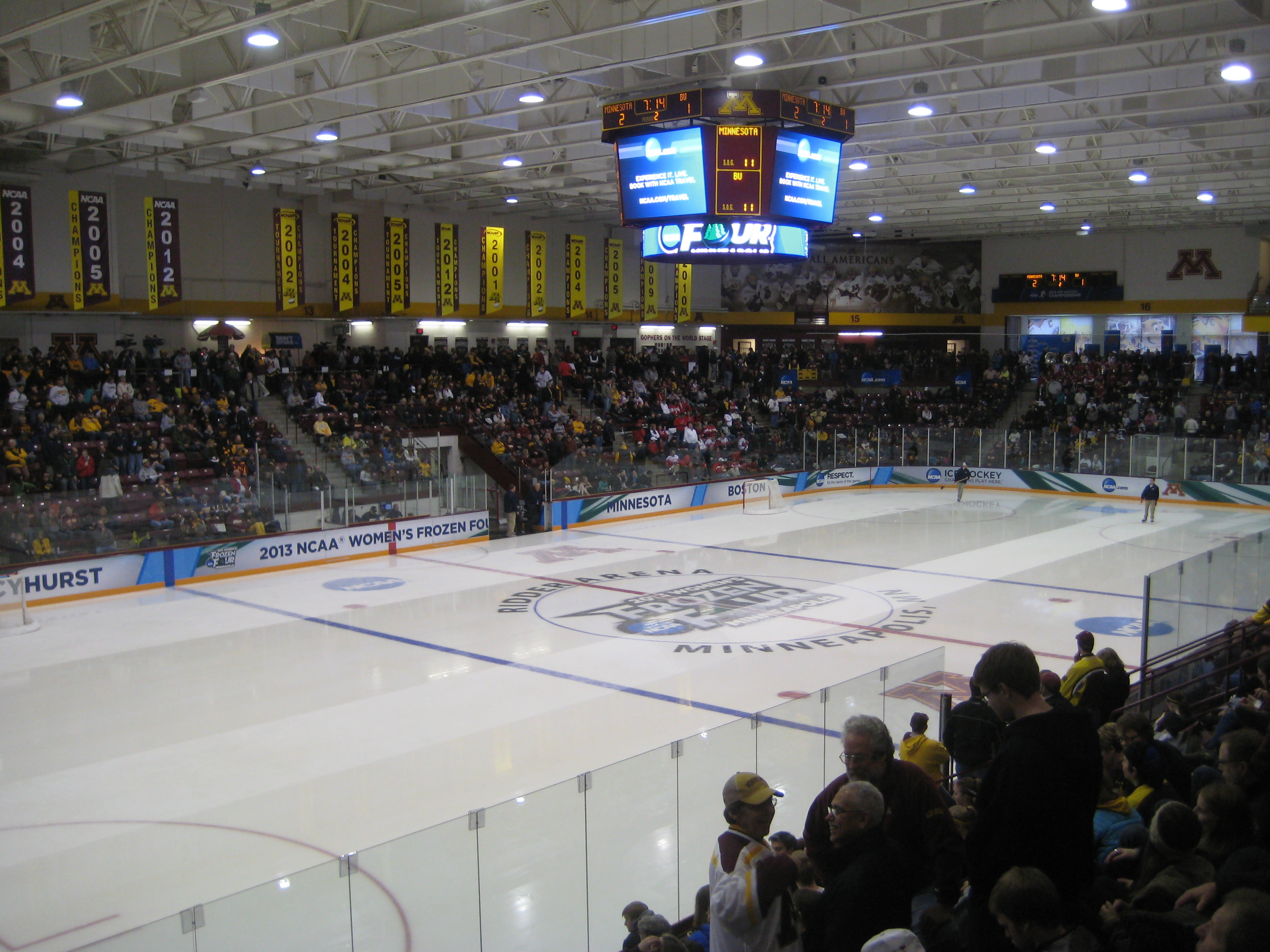
Ridder Arena is the home arena of the Gophers.

The Minnesota Golden Gophers women's ice hockey team represents the University of Minnesota and plays at the Twin Cities campus in Minneapolis. The team is one of the members of the Western Collegiate Hockey Association (WCHA) and competes in the National Collegiate Athletic Association (NCAA) Division I. Since 2002, the Gophers have played their home games in Ridder Arena, the first facility in the United States built specifically for college women's ice hockey.

The program started play in the 1997–98 season with Laura Halldorson as their first head coach. She led the Gophers to the final American Women's College Hockey Alliance national championship in their third season of play, as well as back-to-back NCAA Division I National Championships in 2003–04 and 2004–05.

Brad Frost took over as the Gophers' coach in the 2007–08 season. He led the team to back-to-back NCAA Division I National Championships twice. The first pair was the 2011–12 and 2012–13 seasons. During the 2012–13 season, the Gophers had a perfect 41–0–0 record. The Gophers then won titles in the 2014–15 and 2015–16 seasons. Frost was fired as head coach of the Gopher's women's hockey team on March 17, 2026.

== Table key ==
Key of colors and symbols
| Color/symbol | Explanation |
|---|---|
| † | National champions |
| ‡ | Conference tournament champions |
| ↑ | Conference regular season champions |

Key of terms and abbreviations
| Term or abbreviation | Definition |
|---|---|
| W | Number of wins |
| L | Number of losses |
| T | Number of ties |
| OT, 2OT, etc. | Overtime, 2 Overtimes, etc. |
| Finish | Final position in conference standings |
| Tournament | Results in conference tournament |

== Seasons ==
As of March 17, 2026

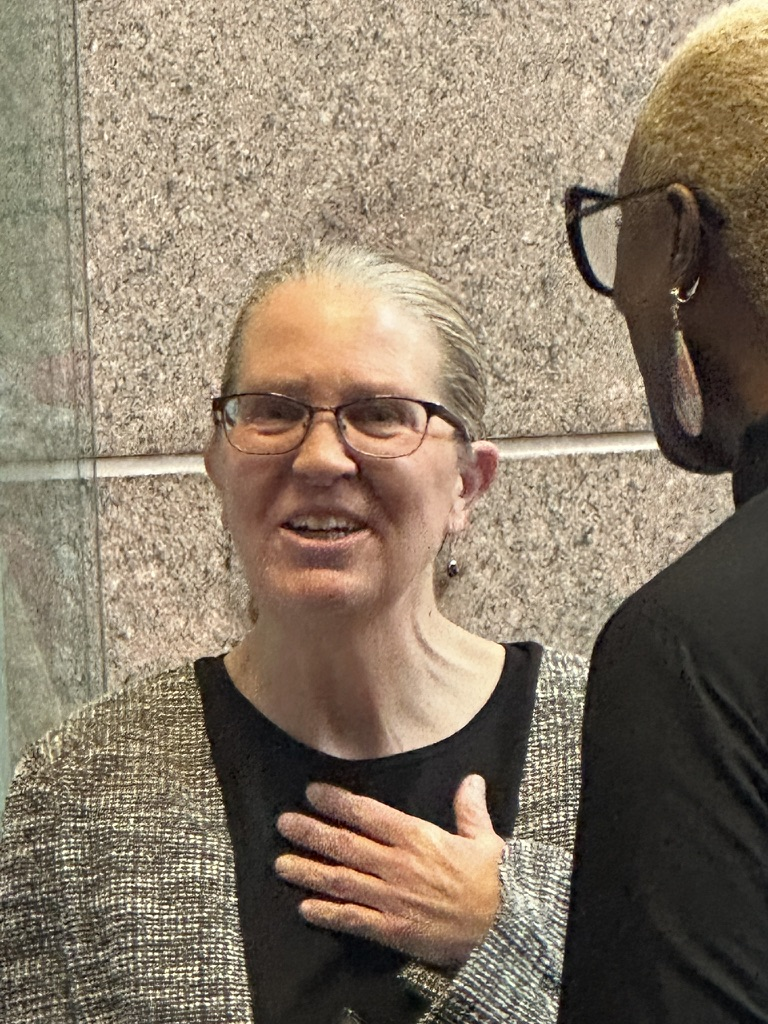
Laura Halldorson was the first head coach for the Minnesota Golden Gophers women's ice hockey team.

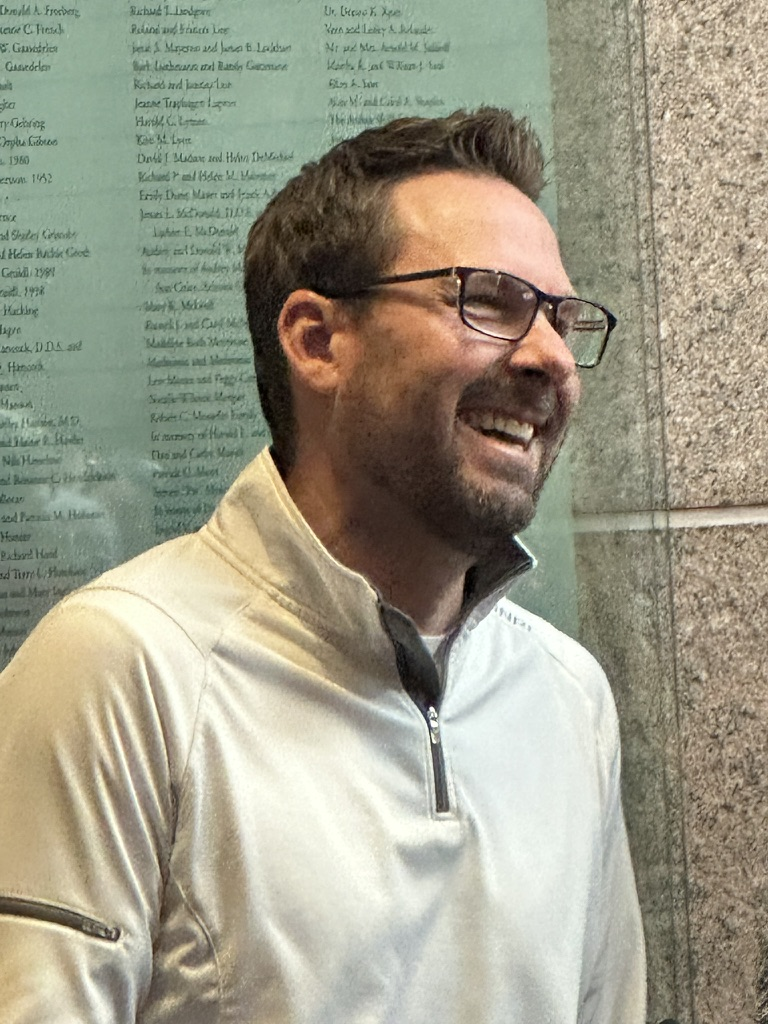
Brad Frost is second and winningest head coach of the Minnesota Golden Gophers women's ice hockey team.

Year by year listing of Minnesota Golden Gophers women's ice hockey seasons
| Season | Coach | Overall | | | Conference | Conference | | | | | Season result | Ref |
| Season | Coach | W | L | T | Conference | W | L | T | Finish | Tournament | Season result | Ref |
|---|---|---|---|---|---|---|---|---|---|---|---|---|
| 1997–98 | Laura Halldorson | 21 | 7 | 3 | AWCHA (Note: From the 1997–98 season to the 1999–2000 season, the national championship tournament was sanctioned by the American Women's College Hockey Alliance, a program funded by the United States Olympic Committee to the NCAA Conference Grant Program.) | —N/a | —N/a | —N/a | —N/a | —N/a | Lost semifinals vs. New Hampshire (1–4); Lost third-place game vs. Northeastern (0–4) | |
| 1998–99 | Laura Halldorson | 29 | 4 | 3 | AWCHA | —N/a | —N/a | —N/a | —N/a | —N/a | Lost semifinals vs. New Hampshire (2–3) OT; Won third-place game vs. Brown (3–2) | |
| 1999–2000† | Laura Halldorson | 32 | 6 | 1 | WCHA (Note: The WCHA started a women's ice hockey division in the 1999–2000 season.) | 21 | 2 | 1 | 2nd | Won quarterfinals vs. Minnesota State (10–0); Won semifinals vs. Wisconsin (5–0); Lost Championship vs. Minnesota Duluth (0–2) | Won Frozen Four vs. Minnesota Duluth (3–2); Won Championship vs. Brown (4–2)† | |
| 2000–01 | Laura Halldorson | 23 | 9 | 2 | WCHA | 18 | 4 | 2 | 1st↑ | Lost semifinals vs. Ohio State (0–4) | Did not qualify | |
| 2001–02 | Laura Halldorson | 28 | 4 | 6 | WCHA‡ | 19 | 2 | 3 | 1st↑ | Won semifinals vs. Ohio State (4–1); Won Championship vs. Wisconsin (3–2)‡ | Lost first round vs. Brown (1–2) | |
| 2002–03 | Laura Halldorson | 27 | 8 | 1 | WCHA | 19 | 4 | 1 | 2nd | Won semifinals vs. Wisconsin (3–1); Lost Championship vs. Minnesota Duluth (3–5) | Lost first round vs. Harvard (1–6) | |
| 2003–04† | Laura Halldorson | 30 | 4 | 2 | WCHA‡ | 19 | 3 | 2 | 1st↑ | Won semifinals vs. Ohio State (5–1); Won Championship vs. Minnesota Duluth (4–2)‡ | Won Frozen Four vs. Dartmouth (5–1); Won Championship vs. Harvard (6–2)† | |
| 2004–05† | Laura Halldorson | 36 | 2 | 2 | WCHA‡ | 25 | 1 | 2 | 1st↑ | Won quarterfinals vs. Bemidji State (6–3); Won semifinals vs. Ohio State (7–1); Won Championship vs. Wisconsin (3–2 OT)‡ | Won first round vs. Providence (6–1); Won Frozen Four vs. Dartmouth (7–2); Won Championship vs. Harvard (4–3)† | |
| 2005–06 | Laura Halldorson | 29 | 11 | 1 | WCHA | 19 | 8 | 1 | 2nd | Won quarterfinals vs. Minnesota State (5–1, 6–0); Won semifinals vs. Minnesota Duluth (2–1); Lost Championship vs. Wisconsin (1–4) | Won first round vs. Princeton (4–0); Won Frozen Four vs. New Hampshire (5–4); Lost Championship vs. Wisconsin (0–3) | |
| 2006–07 | Laura Halldorson | 23 | 12 | 1 | WCHA | 17 | 10 | 1 | 3rd | Won quarterfinals vs. Bemidji State (5–1, 4–1); Won semifinals vs. Minnesota Duluth (3–2 OT); Lost Championship vs. Wisconsin (1–3) | Did not qualify | |
| 2007–08 | Brad Frost | 27 | 7 | 4 | WCHA | 21 | 5 | 2 | 2nd | Won quarterfinals vs. North Dakota (3–1, 9–1); Lost semifinals vs. Wisconsin (3–4) | Lost first round vs. Wisconsin (2–3 OT) | |
| 2008–09 | Brad Frost | 32 | 5 | 3 | WCHA | 23 | 2 | 3 | 1st↑ | Won quarterfinals vs. Bemidji State (4–1, 5–1); Won semifinals vs. Minnesota State (7–2); Lost Championship vs. Wisconsin (3–5) | Won first round vs. Boston College (4–3); Lost Frozen Four vs. Mercyhurst (4–5) | |
| 2009–10 | Brad Frost | 26 | 9 | 5 | WCHA | 18 | 6 | 4 | 2nd | Won quarterfinals vs. Minnesota State (8–5, 4–3); Won semifinals vs. Ohio State (5–4 2OT); Lost Championship vs. Minnesota Duluth (2–3) | Won first round vs. Clarkson (3–2 OT); Lost Frozen Four vs. Minnesota Duluth (2–3) | |
| 2010–11 | Brad Frost | 26 | 10 | 2 | WCHA | 18 | 8 | 2 | 2nd | Won quarterfinals vs. Ohio State (3–2, 4–2); Won semifinals vs. Minnesota Duluth (4–2); Lost Championship vs. Wisconsin (4–5 OT) | Lost first round vs. Boston College (1–4) | |
| 2011–12† | Brad Frost | 34 | 5 | 2 | WCHA‡ | 21 | 5 | 2 | 2nd | Won quarterfinals vs. St. Cloud State (6–1, 6–0); Won semifinals vs. North Dakota (6–0); Won Championship vs. Minnesota Duluth (2–0)‡ | Won first round vs. North Dakota (5–1); Won Frozen Four vs. Cornell (3–1); Won Championship vs. Wisconsin (4–2)† | |
| 2012–13† | Brad Frost | 41 | 0 | 0 | WCHA‡ | 28 | 0 | 0 | 1st↑ | Won quarterfinals vs. Bemidji State (5–0, 8–0); Won semifinals vs. Ohio State (5–0); Won Championship vs. North Dakota (2–0)‡ | Won first round vs. North Dakota (3–2 3OT); Won Frozen Four vs. Boston College (3–2 OT); Won Championship vs. Boston University (6–3)† | |
| 2013–14 | Brad Frost | 38 | 2 | 1 | WCHA‡ | 26 | 1 | 1 | 1st↑ | Won quarterfinals vs. St. Cloud State (4–1, 7–1); Won semifinals vs. Minnesota Duluth (4–1); Won Championship vs. North Dakota (3–1)‡ | Won first round vs. Boston University (5–1); Won Frozen Four vs. Wisconsin (5–3); Lost Championship vs. Clarkson (4–5) | |
| 2014–15† | Brad Frost | 34 | 3 | 4 | WCHA | 22 | 2 | 4 | 1st↑ | Won quarterfinals vs. Minnesota State (10–0, 5–1); Lost semifinals vs. Bemidji State (0–1) | Won first round vs. RIT (6–2); Won Frozen Four vs. Wisconsin (3–1); Won Championship vs. Harvard (4–1)† | |
| 2015–16† | Brad Frost | 35 | 4 | 1 | WCHA | 24 | 3 | 1 | 2nd | Won quarterfinals vs. Ohio State (5–2, 5–0); Won semifinals vs. North Dakota (2–0); Lost Championship vs. Wisconsin (0–1) | Won first round vs. Princeton (6–2); Won Frozen Four vs. Wisconsin (3–2 OT); Won Championship vs. Boston College (3–1)† | |
| 2016–17 | Brad Frost | 26 | 8 | 5 | WCHA | 19 | 4 | 5 | 2nd | Won quarterfinals vs. Bemidji State (3–1, 1–2, 3–2); Lost semifinals vs. Minnesota Duluth (1–2 2OT) | Won first round vs. Minnesota Duluth (1–0); Lost Frozen Four vs. Clarkson (3–4) | |
| 2017–18 | Brad Frost | 24 | 11 | 3 | WCHA‡ | 13 | 8 | 3 | 3rd | Won quarterfinals vs. St. Cloud State (5–1, 4–1); Won semifinals vs. Ohio State (2–0); Won Championship vs. Wisconsin (3–1)‡ | Lost first round vs. Wisconsin (0–4) | |
| 2018–19 | Brad Frost | 32 | 6 | 1 | WCHA | 19 | 4 | 1 | 1st↑ | Won semifinals vs. Minnesota Duluth (4–1); Lost Championship vs. Wisconsin (1–3) | Won first round vs. Princeton (5–2); Won Frozen Four vs. Cornell (2–0); Lost Championship vs. Wisconsin (0–2) | |
| 2019–20 | Brad Frost | 27 | 6 | 3 | WCHA | 17 | 5 | 2 | 2nd | Won quarterfinals vs. St. Cloud State (4–2, 7–3); Lost semifinals vs Ohio State (4–3 OT) | 2020 Tournament canceled due to COVID-19 pandemic | |
| 2020–21 (Note: Due to the COVID-19 pandemic, the 2020–21 season was shortened to 19 regular season games, all within the WCHA conference.) | Brad Frost | 11 | 8 | 1 | WCHA | 11 | 7 | 1 | 4th | Lost semifinals vs. Wisconsin (3–5) | Did not qualify | |
| 2021–22 | Brad Frost | 29 | 9 | 1 | WCHA | 21 | 6 | 1 | 1st↑ | Won quarterfinals vs. St. Thomas (4–0, 5–1); Won semifinals vs. Minnesota Duluth (5–1); Lost Championship vs. Ohio State (2–3 OT) | Lost quarterfinals vs. Minnesota Duluth (1–2) | |
| 2022–23 | Brad Frost | 30 | 6 | 3 | WCHA‡ | 22 | 3 | 3 | 2nd | Won quarterfinals vs. St. Thomas (7–0, 6–2); Won semifinals vs. Wisconsin (4–2); Won Championship vs. Ohio State (3–1)‡ | Won semifinals vs. Minnesota Duluth (3–0); Lost Frozen Four vs. Wisconsin (3–2 OT) | |
| 2023–24 | Brad Frost | 27 | 10 | 2 | WCHA | 19 | 7 | 2 | 3rd | Won quarterfinals vs. Minnesota State (4–5, 7–1, 3–0); Lost semifinals vs. Wisconsin (4–3 OT) | Lost quarterfinals vs. Clarkson (2–3 4OT) | |
| 2024–25 | Brad Frost | 29 | 12 | 1 | WCHA | 19 | 8 | 1 | 3rd | Won quarterfinals vs. Minnesota State (6–1, 4–5 (2OT), 6–2); Won semifinals vs. Ohio State (6–2); Lost Championship vs. Wisconsin (3–4) | Won quarterfinals vs. Clarkson (3–2); Lost Frozen Four vs. Wisconsin (2–6) | |
| 2025–26 | Brad Frost | 26 | 12 | 1 | WCHA | 18 | 9 | 1 | 3rd | Won quarterfinals vs. St. Cloud State (0–1 (OT), 4–1, 6–1); Lost Semifinal vs Ohio State (0–4) | Lost quarterfinals vs. Northeastern (2–4) | |
| Totals | | 835 | 196 | 66 | | 536 | 126 | 53 | – | – | 26 postseason tournament appearances | |

== See also ==
- List of Ohio State Buckeyes women's ice hockey seasons
