= 2004–05 Minnesota Golden Gophers women's ice hockey season =

WCHA Champions 2005, National Champions
- Conference: 1 WCHA
- Home ice: Ridder Arena

Rankings
- USA Today/USA Hockey Magazine: 1
- USCHO.com/CBS College Sports: 1

Record
- Overall: 36–2–2
- Conference: 25–1–2
- Home: 19–0–1
- Road: 14–2–1
- Neutral: 3–0–0

Coaches and captains
- Head coach: Laura Halldorson
- Assistant coaches: Brad Frost
- Captain(s): Kelly Stephens; Krissy Wendell

The 2004–05 Minnesota Golden Gophers women's ice hockey season represented the University of Minnesota during the 2004–05 NCAA Division I women's ice hockey season. The Gophers had an overall record of 36–2–2, and a 25–1–2 record in WCHA conference play. Both totals established the most wins in a season and in conference action since the start of the Gophers program in 1997–98. From the beginning of the season to the end, the Gophers were ranked No. 1. In addition, the Gophers were ranked in the top five in every statistical category, including winning percentage, power-play and offensive scoring.

== Regular season ==
=== Standings ===
2004–05 Western Collegiate Hockey Association standings
	Conference								Overall					
	GP	W	L	T	SOW	PTS	GF	GA	GP	W	L	T	GF	GA
Minnesota†*	28	25	1	2	–	52	129	26	40	36	2	2	197	54
Minnesota Duluth	28	22	4	2	–	46	110	41	34	26	6	2	131	54
Wisconsin	28	20	7	1	–	41	119	44	38	28	9	1	170	59
Ohio State	28	12	15	1	–	25	73	97	37	17	17	3	99	124
Minnesota State	28	8	17	3	–	19	47	85	35	9	20	6	54	101
St. Cloud State	28	7	18	3	–	17	47	105	35	9	22	4	63	124
North Dakota	28	6	21	1	–	13	52	125	35	9	23	3	74	143
Bemidji State	28	5	22	1	–	11	48	102	35	9	24	2	69	121
Championship: † indicates conference regular season champion; * indicates conference tournament champion Updated July 21, 2024

- During the 2004–05 season, Krissy Wendell set an NCAA record (since tied) for most shorthanded goals in one season with 7. After graduating from Minnesota, she had the career record for most shorthanded goals in a career with 16. Ironically, both marks were tied by Meghan Agosta.
- Krissy Wendell scored the game-winning goal in the 2005 WCHA championship game against Wisconsin. She followed that with a hat trick against ECAC champion Harvard. She was the NCAA runner-up in the scoring race to Gophers teammate Natalie Darwitz with 98 points.

=== Schedule ===
As of September 14, 2024.

Date	Time	Opponent^{#}	Rank^{#}	Site	Decision	Result	Attendance	Record
Regular Season
October 8	7:07	at North Dakota		Ralph Engelstad Arena • Grand Forks, ND	Horak	W 8–0	2,823	1–0–0 (1–0–0)
October 9	7:05	at North Dakota		Ralph Engelstad Arena • Grand Forks, ND	Reinen	W 7–1	1,325	2–0–0 (2–0–0)
October 15	7:05	St. Cloud State	#1	Ridder Arena • Minneapolis, MN	Horak	W 7–0	1,193	3–0–0 (3–0–0)
October 16	7:05	St. Cloud State	#1	Ridder Arena • Minneapolis, MN	Horak	W 7–1	1,002	4–0–0 (4–0–0)
October 22	2:05	at Bemidji State	#1	John S. Glas Field House • Bemidji, MN	Horak	W 5–0	163	5–0–0 (5–0–0)
October 23	2:05	at Bemidji State	#1	John S. Glas Fieldhouse • Bemidji State, MN	Reinen	W 5–2	158	6–0–0 (6–0–0)
October 29	7:05	at Minnesota State		Midwest Wireless Civic Center • Mankato, MN	Horak	W 6–1	411	7–0–0 (7–0–0)
October 30	7:05	at Minnesota State		Midwest Wireless Civic Center • Mankato, MN	Reinen	W 6–0	610	8–0–0 (8–0–0)
November 6	1:05	Ohio State		Ridder Arena • Minneapolis, MN	Horak	W 10–0	1,556	9–0–0 (9–0–0)
November 7	1:05	Ohio State		Ridder Arena • Minneapolis, MN	Horak	W 5–1	1,853	10–0–0 (10–0–0)
November 19	7:05	Minnesota Duluth		Ridder Arena • Minneapolis, MN	Horak	W 4–2	2,457	11–0–0 (11–0–0)
November 20	7:05	Minnesota Duluth		Ridder Arena • Minneapolis, MN	Horak	T 2–2 ^{OT}	2,480	11–0–1 (11–0–1)
November 26	1:00	vs. Northeastern*	#1	Bright Hockey Center • Cambridge, MA	Reinen	W 8–1	200	12–0–1 (11–0–1)
November 27	4:10	at #4 Harvard*	#1	Bright Hockey Center • Cambridge, MA	Horak	W 5–3	527	13–0–1 (11–0–1)
December 4	2:05	at #4 Wisconsin	#1	Kohl Center • Madison, WI	Horak	W 2–0	1,338	14–0–1 (12–0–1)
December 5	2:05	at #4 Wisconsin	#1	Kohl Center • Madison, WI	Horak	T 3–3 ^{OT}	1,186	14–0–2 (12–0–2)
December 11	2:00	at #2 Dartmouth*	#1	Thompson Arena • Hanover, NH	Horak	L 5–7	1,786	14–1–2 (12–0–2)
December 12	11:00	at #2 Dartmouth*	#1	Thompson Arena • Hanover, NH	Horak	W 4–3 ^{OT}	1,316	15–1–2 (12–0–2)
January 7	7:05	Bemidji State		Ridder Arena • Minneapolis, MN	Reinen	W 2–0	1,449	16–1–2 (13–0–2)
January 8	2:05	Bemidji State		Ridder Arena • Minneapolis, MN	Horak	W 5–0	1,009	17–1–2 (14–0–2)
January 14	7:05	Brown*		Ridder Arena • Minneapolis, MN	Horak	W 8–2	1,264	18–1–2 (14–0–2)
January 15	7:05	Brown*		Ridder Arena • Minneapolis, MN	Reinen	W 5–0	1,319	19–1–2 (14–0–2)
January 21	7:07	at #10 Ohio State	#1	Ohio State University Ice Rink • Columbus, OH	Horak	W 4–1	271	20–1–2 (15–0–2)
January 22	7:07	at #10 Ohio State	#1	Ohio State University Ice Rink • Columbus, OH	Reinen	W 4–2	275	21–1–2 (16–0–2)
January 29	2:05	Wisconsin		Ridder Arena • Minneapolis, MN	Horak	W 4–1	2,461	22–1–2 (17–0–2)
January 30	2:05	Wisconsin		Ridder Arena • Minneapolis, MN	Horak	W 2–1	2,013	23–1–2 (18–0–2)
February 4	7:07	at St. Cloud State	#1	Herb Brooks National Hockey Center • St. Cloud, MN	Horak	W 4–1	311	24–1–2 (19–0–2)
February 5	7:07	at St. Cloud State	#1	Herb Brooks National Hockey Center • St. Cloud, MN	Reinen	W 5–1	489	25–1–2 (20–0–2)
February 12	2:05	North Dakota		Ridder Arena • Minneapolis, MN	Reinen	W 7–0	1,781	26–1–2 (21–0–2)
February 13	2:05	North Dakota		Ridder Arena • Minneapolis, MN	Reinen	W 4–2	1,445	27–1–2 (22–0–2)
February 19	3:05	Minnesota State		Ridder Arena • Minneapolis, MN	Horak	W 5–0	2,194	28–1–2 (23–0–2)
February 20	3:00	Minnesota State		Ridder Arena • Minneapolis, MN	Reinen	W 3–0	2,148	29–1–2 (24–0–2)
February 26	7:07	at #2 Minnesota Duluth	#1	Duluth Entertainment Convention Center • Duluth, MN	Horak	L 4–2	3,001	29–2–2 (24–1–2)
February 27	3:07	at #2 Minnesota Duluth	#1	Duluth Entertainment Convention Center • Duluth, MN	Horak	W 1–0	1,854	30–2–2 (25–1–2)
WCHA Tournament
March 3	7:34	Bemidji State*		Ridder Arena • Minneapolis, MN (WCHA First Round)	Reinen	W 6–3	1,011	31–2–2 (25–1–2)
March 5	7:30	Ohio State*		Ridder Arena • Minneapolis, MN (WCHA Final Faceoff, Semifinals)	Horak	W 7–1	1,308	32–2–2 (25–1–2)
March 6	4:10	Wisconsin*		Ridder Arena • Minneapolis, MN (WCHA Final Faceoff, Finals)	Horak	W 3–2 ^{OT}	1,513	33–2–2 (25–1–2)
NCAA Tournament
March 18	7:05	Providence*		Ridder Arena • Minneapolis, MN (NCAA Tournament, First Round)	Horak	W 6–1	1,194	34–2–2 (25–1–2)
March 25	8:30	vs. Dartmouth*		Whittemore Center • Durham, NH (NCAA Frozen Four)	Horak	W 7–2	2,204	35–2–2 (25–1–2)
March 27	4:08	vs. #2 Harvard*	#1	Whittemore Center • Durham, NH (NCAA Championship)	Horak	W 4–3	2,056	36–2–2 (25–1–2)
*Non-conference game. ^{#}Rankings from USCHO.com Poll.

=== Roster ===
No.	Nat.	Player	Class	Pos	Height	DoB	Hometown	Previous team
1		Brenda Reinen	Senior	G	5' 6" (1.68 m)		Sun Prairie, Wisconsin	Sun Prairie High School
2		Whitney Graft	Freshman	F	5' 4" (1.63 m)		Wayzata, Minnesota	Wayzata High School
4		Andrea Nichols	Sophomore	F	5' 2" (1.57 m)		Mountain Iron, Minnesota	Hibbing High School
5		Chelsey Brodt	Junior	D	5' 4" (1.63 m)	1983-12-07	Roseville, Minnesota	Roseville Area High School
6		Liz Palkie	Freshman	F	5' 6" (1.68 m)		Carlton, Minnesota	Carlton High School
7		Krissy Wendell	Junior	F	5' 6" (1.68 m)	1981-09-12	Brooklyn Park, Minnesota	Park Center Senior High School
8		Bobbi Ross	Freshman	F	5' 7" (1.7 m)		Verwood, Saskatchewan	Collège Mathieu
8		Noelle Sutton	Senior	F	5' 8" (1.73 m)		Maple Grove, Minnesota	Maple Grove High School
10		Krista Johnson	Junior	D	5' 8" (1.73 m)		Blaine, Minnesota	Blaine High School
11		Ashley Albrecht	Junior	D	5' 4" (1.63 m)		South Saint Paul, Minnesota	South Saint Paul Secondary
12		Stacy Troumbly	Senior	F/D	5' 2" (1.57 m)		Bovey, Minnesota	Hibbing High School
13		Maggie Souba	Sophomore	F/D	5' 5" (1.65 m)		Moorhead, Minnesota	Moorhead High School
15		Anya Miller	Freshman	D	5' 8" (1.73 m)		Elk River, Minnesota	Elk River High School
16		Jenelle Philipczyk	Freshman	F	5' 5" (1.65 m)		Woodbury, Minnesota	Eagan High School
17		Becky Wacker	Sophomore	F	5' 4" (1.63 m)		York, Maine	York High School
18		Kelly Stephens	Senior	F	5' 6" (1.68 m)	1983-06-04	Shoreline, Washington	Shorewood High School
21		Allie Sanchez	Junior	D	5' 6" (1.68 m)		Saint Paul, Minnesota	Johnson High School
22		Erica McKenzie	Freshman	F	5' 8" (1.73 m)		Hastings, Minnesota	Hastings High School
25		Lyndsay Wall	Sophomore	D	5' 8" (1.73 m)	1985-05-12	Churchville, New York	Churchville-Chili High School
27		Jody Horak	Senior	G	5' 7" (1.7 m)		Blaine, Minnesota	Blaine High School
30		Natalie Lamme	Junior	G	5' 7" (1.7 m)		Hibbing, Minnesota	Hibbing High School

== Player stats ==
= Indicates team leader

=== Skaters ===
Player	GP	G	A	Pts	P/G	PIM	GWG	PPG	SHG
Natalie Darwitz	40	42	72	114	2.8500	0	9	9	5
Krissy Wendell	40	43	61	104	2.6000	0	9	14	7
Kelly Stephens	40	33	43	76	1.9000	0	5	16	2
Lyndsay Wall	39	14	34	48	1.2308	0	0	12	0
Bobbi Ross	40	15	18	33	0.8250	0	2	10	2
Erica McKenzie	36	12	9	21	0.5833	0	2	3	0
Andrea Nichols	40	10	8	18	0.4500	0	2	3	2
Chelsey Brodt	40	4	13	17	0.4250	0	0	1	0
Ashley Albrecht	40	4	12	16	0.4000	0	2	1	0
Becky Wacker	36	5	7	12	0.3333	0	2	0	1
Allie Sanchez	39	2	8	10	0.2564	0	1	0	0
Liz Palkie	40	3	5	8	0.2000	0	0	0	0
Noelle Sutton	34	2	5	7	0.2059	0	0	0	0
Anya Miller	39	2	5	7	0.1795	0	0	0	0
Jenelle Philipczyk	40	2	4	6	0.1500	0	1	0	0
Maggie Souba	35	1	3	4	0.1143	0	1	0	0
Krista Johnson	31	1	2	3	0.0968	0	0	0	0
Stacy Troumbly	36	2	0	2	0.0556	0	0	1	0
Whitney Graft	31	0	1	1	0.0323	0	0	0	0
Jody Horak	28	0	0	0	0.0000	0	0	0	0
Brenda Reinen	12	0	0	0	0.0000	0	0	0	0

=== Goaltenders ===
Player	GP	W	L	T	GA	TOI	GAA	SO	SV	SV%
Jody Horak	28	24	2	2	41	1691:41	1.45	8	498	.924
Brenda Reinen	12	12	0	0	12	719:37	1.00	5	212	.946

== Postseason ==
The Gophers then went on to win their second straight WCHA Championship with a 3–2 overtime win over Wisconsin. In the NCAA playoffs, the Gophers defeated the Providence Friars by a 6–1 score. With the win, the Gophers advanced to its fourth-straight NCAA Frozen Four appearance. The Gophers defeated the Dartmouth Big Green by a 7–2 score in the semifinal game. In the first period, the Gophers scored five goals in the first period. On March 27, the Gophers defeated the Harvard Crimson by a 4–3 mark to win their consecutive national championship.

=== Awards and honors ===
- Natalie Darwitz, Patty Kazmaier Award top three finalist
- Laura Halldorson, WCHA Coach of the Year (her third award)
- Krissy Wendell, Patty Kazmaier Award (Wendell became the first player from Minnesota, and the first from the WCHA to win the Patty Kazmaier Award)
- The Gophers had four players garner All-America honors, the most in a single season.
