= 2005–06 Minnesota Golden Gophers women's ice hockey season =

- Conference: 2 WCHA
- Home ice: Ridder Arena

Record
- Overall: 29–11–1
- Conference: 19–8–1
- Home: 16–6–0
- Road: 12–3–1
- Neutral: 1–2–0

Coaches and captains
- Head coach: Laura Halldorson
- Assistant coaches: Brad Frost
- Captain(s): Andrea Nichols; Chelsey Brodt; Bobbi Ross

The 2005–06 Minnesota Golden Gophers women's hockey team represented the University of Minnesota in the 2005–06 NCAA Division I women's hockey season. The Golden Gophers were coached by Laura Halldorson and played their home games at Ridder Arena.

== Regular season ==
=== Standings ===
2005–06 Western Collegiate Hockey Association standings
	Conference								Overall					
	GP	W	L	T	SOW	PTS	GF	GA	GP	W	L	T	GF	GA
Wisconsin†*	28	24	3	1	–	49	103	40	41	36	4	1	155	51
Minnesota	28	19	8	1	–	39	82	50	41	29	11	1	122	69
Minnesota Duluth	28	18	7	3	–	39	97	47	34	22	9	3	120	54
St. Cloud State	28	13	14	1	–	27	70	69	37	18	18	1	97	98
Ohio State	28	10	15	3	–	23	68	89	36	13	18	5	87	107
Bemidji State	28	10	18	0	–	20	60	95	36	11	23	2	72	119
Minnesota State	28	8	17	3	–	19	52	75	36	11	21	4	70	102
North Dakota	28	3	23	2	–	8	40	107	36	7	27	2	60	131
Championship: † indicates conference regular season champion; * indicates conference tournament champion Updated July 21, 2024

=== Schedule ===
As of September 27, 2024.

Date	Time	Opponent^{#}	Rank^{#}	Site	Decision	Result	Attendance	Record
Regular Season
October 7	7:07	Connecticut*		Ridder Arena • Minneapolis, MN	Chartier	W 3–0	952	1–0–0
October 8	7:07	St. Lawrence*		Ridder Arena • Minneapolis, MN	Chartier	L 1–3	1,195	1–1–0
October 14	2:07	at Bemidji State	#4	John S. Glas Field House • Bemidji, MN	Chartier	W 2–0	217	2–1–0 (1–0–0)
October 15	2:07	at Bemidji State	#4	John S. Glas Field House • Bemidji, MN	Chartier	W 3–2	248	3–1–0 (2–0–0)
October 21	7:00	at #8 Mercyhurst*	#4	Mercyhurst Ice Center • Erie, PA	Chartier	W 1–0	1,100	4–1–0 (2–0–0)
October 22	3:00	at #8 Mercyhurst*	#4	Mercyhurst Ice Center • Erie, PA	Chartier	W 4–2	1,500	5–1–0 (2–0–0)
October 28	7:07	#2 Minnesota Duluth	#4	Ridder Arena • Minneapolis, MN	Chartier	W 4–1	1,592	6–1–0 (3–0–0)
October 29	7:07	#2 Minnesota Duluth	#4	Ridder Arena • Minneapolis, MN	Chartier	L 0–6	1,645	6–2–0 (3–1–0)
November 4	7:07	Ohio State		Ridder Arena • Minneapolis, MN	Chartier	W 9–5	1,057	7–2–0 (4–1–0)
November 5	7:07	Ohio State		Ridder Arena • Minneapolis, MN	Chartier	L 1–2 ^{OT}	1,116	7–3–0 (4–2–0)
November 12	1:07	Brown*	#4	Ridder Arena • Minneapolis, MN	Chartier	W 5–1	1,383	8–3–0 (4–2–0)
November 13	1:00	Brown*	#4	Ridder Arena • Minneapolis, MN	Hanlon	W 3–0	1,238	9–3–0 (4–2–0)
November 18	7:07	#3 Wisconsin	#4	Ridder Arena • Minneapolis, MN	Chartier	L 0–2	1,601	9–4–0 (4–3–0)
November 19	7:07	#3 Wisconsin	#4	Ridder Arena • Minneapolis, MN	Hanlon	L 2–6	1,809	9–5–0 (4–4–0)
December 2	7:07	at North Dakota		Ralph Engelstad Arena • Grand Forks, ND	Chartier	W 4–0	612	10–5–0 (5–4–0)
December 3	7:07	at North Dakota		Ralph Engelstad Arena • Grand Forks, ND	Chartier	W 3–1	876	11–5–0 (6–4–0)
December 9	7:07	at Minnesota State		Midwest Wireless Civic Center • Mankato, MN	Hanlon	W 1–0	452	12–5–0 (7–4–0)
December 10	3:07	at Minnesota State		Midwest Wireless Civic Center • Mankato, MN	Chartier	T 1–1 ^{OT}	463	12–5–1 (7–4–1)
January 6	4:07	Bemidji State		Ridder Arena • Minneapolis, MN	Hanlon	W 7–2	789	13–5–1 (8–4–1)
January 7	4:07	Bemidji State		Ridder Arena • Minneapolis, MN	Hanlon	L 1–2	1,201	13–6–1 (8–5–1)
January 13	7:07	at St. Cloud State	#5	Herb Brooks National Hockey Center • St. Cloud, MN	Hanlon	W 2–0	437	14–6–1 (9–5–1)
January 14	4:07	St. Cloud State	#5	Ridder Arena • Minneapolis, MN	Chartier	W 5–0	1,440	15–6–1 (10–5–1)
January 20	7:07	at #4 Minnesota Duluth	#5	Duluth Entertainment Convention Center • Duluth, MN	Hanlon	L 2–4	1,566	15–7–1 (10–6–1)
January 21	7:07	at #4 Minnesota Duluth	#5	Duluth Entertainment Convention Center • Duluth, MN	Chartier	W 2–0	1,700	16–7–1 (11–6–1)
January 27	7:07	at Ohio State	#4	Ohio State University Ice Rink • Columbus, OH	Hanlon	W 4–1	231	17–7–1 (12–6–1)
January 28	4:07	at Ohio State	#4	Ohio State University Ice Rink • Columbus, OH	Chartier	L 2–3 ^{OT}	413	17–8–1 (12–7–1)
February 3	7:07	Minnesota State	#4	Ridder Arena • Minneapolis, MN	Hanlon	W 2–1 ^{OT}	1,533	18–8–1 (13–7–1)
February 4	4:07	Minnesota State	#4	Ridder Arena • Minneapolis, MN	Chartier	W 4–3	2,381	19–8–1 (14–7–1)
February 10	7:07	at #2 Wisconsin	#5	Kohl Center • Madison, WI	Hanlon	W 3–1	1,704	20–8–1 (15–7–1)
February 11	7:07	at #2 Wisconsin	#5	Kohl Center • Madison, WI	Chartier	L 1–3	1,737	20–9–1 (15–8–1)
February 17	7:07	at #9 St. Cloud State	#4	Herb Brooks National Hockey Center • St. Cloud, MN	Hanlon	W 3–2	312	21–9–1 (16–8–1)
February 18	4:07	#9 St. Cloud State	#4	Ridder Arena • Minneapolis, MN	Hanlon	W 4–2	1,194	22–9–1 (17–8–1)
February 25	3:07	North Dakota	#4	Ridder Arena • Minneapolis, MN	Hanlon	W 4–0	1,268	23–9–1 (18–8–1)
February 26	3:07	North Dakota	#4	Ridder Arena • Minneapolis, MN	Chartier	W 6–0	1,581	24–9–1 (19–8–1)
WCHA Tournament
March 3	6:07	Minnesota State*	#4	Ridder Arena • Minneapolis, MN (WCHA Tournament, First Round, Game 1)	Hanlon	W 5–1	482	25–9–1 (19–8–1)
March 4	4:00	Minnesota State*	#4	Ridder Arena • Minneapolis, MN (WCHA Tournament, First Round, Game 2)	Hanlon	W 6–0	674	26–9–1 (19–8–1)
March 11	4:07	Minnesota Duluth*		Ridder Arena • Minneapolis, MN (WCHA Tournament, Semifinal Game)	Hanlon	W 2–1	1,780	27–9–1 (19–8–1)
March 12	1:07	Wisconsin*		Ridder Arena • Minneapolis, MN (WCHA Tournament, Championship Game)	Chartier	L 1–4	1,012	27–10–1 (19–8–1)
NCAA Tournament
March 17	7:05	#6 Princeton*	#4	Ridder Arena • Minneapolis, MN (NCAA Tournament, First Round)	Chartier	W 4–0	703	28–10–1 (19–8–1)
March 24	7:07	#1 New Hampshire*	#4	Ridder Arena • Minneapolis, MN (NCAA Frozen Four, Semifinal Game)	Chartier	W 5–4	2,876	29–10–1 (19–8–1)
March 26	3:07	#2 Wisconsin*	#4	Ridder Arena • Minneapolis, MN	Chartier	L 0–3	4,701	29–11–1 (19–8–1)
*Non-conference game. ^{#}Rankings from USCHO.com Poll.

=== News and notes ===
In her freshman year, Gigi Marvin ranked second on the team in points and first in assists with 30. She tied for fourth in the WCHA in overall scoring and second in assists. She had seven power-play goals, three game-winning goals and one short-handed goal. In addition, she was named the WCHA Rookie of the Week five times. On October 7, 2005, she earned her first career goal on her first career shot in a 3–0 win over Connecticut. She had a four-game scoring streak from October 14–22. On November 4, she had a career-high five point game in the 9–5 win over Ohio State, including four assists. For her efforts, she was named the WCHA Rookie of the Week. She added three assists in a 5–1 win over Brown on November 12. In the Gophers’ 5–0 win over St. Cloud State on January 14, she scored two goals and two assists for four points. She assisted on the game-winning goal in the 1–0 win over Mercyhurst College on January 21. In early February, Marvin notched two goals and an assist in Minnesota’s 4–3 overtime win over Minnesota State and later earned rookie of the week honor. She contributed on all three goals in the Gophers’ 3–2 win over St. Cloud State on February 17. The week later, she would get five points in the sweep against North Dakota and receive the WCHA Rookie of the Week for the second consecutive week.

=== Roster ===
No.	Nat.	Player	Class	Pos	Height	DoB	Hometown	Previous team
2		Whitney Graft	Freshman	F	5' 4" (1.63 m)		Wayzata, Minnesota	Wayzata High School
3		Melanie Gagnon	Freshman	D	5' 5" (1.65 m)		St. Adolphe, Manitoba	St. Norbert Collegiate High School
4		Andrea Nichols	Junior	F	5' 2" (1.57 m)		Mountain Iron, Minnesota	Hibbing High School
5		Chelsey Brodt	Senior	D	5' 4" (1.63 m)	1983-12-07	Roseville, Minnesota	Roseville Area High School
6		Liz Palkie	Sophomore	F	5' 6" (1.68 m)		Carlton, Minnesota	Carlton High School
8		Bobbi Ross	Sophomore	F	5' 7" (1.7 m)		Verwood, Saskatchewan	Collège Mathieu
9		Marley Wournell	Freshman	F	5' 7" (1.7 m)		Vernon, British Columbia	Clarence Fulton Secondary School
10		Krista Johnson	Senior	D	5' 8" (1.73 m)		Blaine, Minnesota	Blaine High School
11		Ashley Albrecht	Senior	D	5' 4" (1.63 m)		South Saint Paul, Minnesota	South Saint Paul Secondary
13		Maggie Souba	Junior	F/D	5' 5" (1.65 m)		Moorhead, Minnesota	Moorhead High School
14		Lindsay Block	Freshman	F	5' 5" (1.65 m)		Chaska, Minnesota	Chaska High School
15		Anya Miller	Sophomore	D	5' 8" (1.73 m)		Elk River, Minnesota	Elk River High School
16		Jenelle Philipczyk	Sophomore	F	5' 5" (1.65 m)		Woodbury, Minnesota	Eagan High School
17		Becky Wacker	Junior	F	5' 4" (1.63 m)		York, Maine	York High School
19		Gigi Marvin	Freshman	F	5' 8" (1.73 m)	1987-03-07	Warroad, Minnesota	Warroad High School
21		Allie Sanchez	Senior	D	5' 6" (1.68 m)		Saint Paul, Minnesota	Johnson High School
22		Erica McKenzie	Sophomore	F	5' 8" (1.73 m)		Hastings, Minnesota	Hastings High School
23		Dagney Willey	Freshman	D	5' 5" (1.65 m)		Maple Grove, Minnesota	Osseo Senior High School
30		Natalie Lammé	Senior	G	5' 7" (1.7 m)		Hibbing, Minnesota	Hibbing High School, Ohio State
33		Brittony Chartier	Freshman	G	6' 0" (1.83 m)		Saskatoon, Saskatchewan	Bishop Carroll High School, Calgary Oval X-Treme
39		Kim Hanlon	Freshman	G	5' 6" (1.68 m)		Blaine, Minnesota	Blaine High School

== Postseason ==
In the 2006 WCHA playoffs, Marvin made several contributions. She notched three goals and two assists in the WCHA first round against Minnesota State. On March 11, Marvin set up Jenelle Philipczyk for the game-winning goal in the 2–1 win over Minnesota Duluth. She would assist on Allie Sanchez’ power-play goal in the WCHA Championship game against Wisconsin.

== Awards and honors ==
- Gigi Marvin, WCHA All-Tournament Team
- Gigi Marvin, led WCHA Rookies in scoring
- Gigi Marvin, named WCHA Rookie of the Year
- Gigi Marvin, All-WHCA Rookie Team
- Gigi Marvin, All-WCHA third team selection.
