= 1997–98 Minnesota Golden Gophers women's ice hockey season =

- Conference: AWCHA
- Home ice: Mariucci Arena

Record
- Overall: 21–7–3
- Home: 13–2–3
- Road: 5–2–0
- Neutral: 3–3

Coaches and captains
- Head coach: Laura Halldorson
- Captain(s): Julie Otto; Kris Scholz

The 1997–98 season was the Golden Gophers' first season playing women's hockey. It was Laura Halldorson's first season coaching the new Gophers women's team, having been hired from Colby College the year prior to build the program. They finished fourth nationally, losing both the quarterfinal game and third-place game in the AWCHA tournament.

== Regular season ==
=== Schedule ===
Sources.

| Date | Time | Opponent | Site | Decision | Result | Attendance | Record | Ref |
Regular Season
| November 2 | 6:15 | Augsburg* | Mariucci Arena • Minneapolis, MN | Killewald | W 8–0 | 6,854 | 1–0–0 | |
| November 6 | 7:00 | Harvard* | Mariucci Arena • Minneapolis, MN | Killewald | L 2–3 | 1,466 | 1–1–0 | |
| November 8 | 11:00 | British Columbia* | Mariucci Arena • Minneapolis, MN | Killewald | W 10–2 | 1,464 | 2–1–0 | |
| November 9 | 3:00 | New Hampshire* | Mariucci Arena • Minneapolis, MN | Killewald | L 1–5 | 1,824 | 2–2–0 | |
| November 15 | 2:00 | St. Cloud State* | Mariucci Arena • Minneapolis, MN | Harms | W 10–0 | 3,208 | 3–2–0 | |
| November 23 | 2:10 | at Gustavus Adolphus* | Don Roberts Ice Rink • St. Peter, MN | Killewald | W 6–0 | 155 | 4–2–0 | |
| November 28 | 6:45 | vs. Providence* | Hobey Baker Memorial Rink • Princeton, NJ | Killewald | W 5–4 | 55 | 5–2–0 | |
| November 29 | 2:30 | at Princeton* | Hobey Baker Memorial Rink • Princeton, NJ | Killewald | W 6–1 | 96 | 6–2–0 | |
| November 30 | 11:00 | vs. Cornell* | Hobey Baker Memorial Rink • Princeton, NJ | Killewald | W 3–2 | 60 | 7–2–0 | |
| December 16 | 7:00 | Princeton* | Mariucci Arena • Minneapolis, MN | Killewald | W 5–3 | 1,858 | 8–2–0 | |
| December 17 | 7:00 | Princeton* | Mariucci Arena • Minneapolis, MN | Killewald | T 5–5 ^{OT} | 1,212 | 8–2–1 | |
| December 28 | 7:00 | at Brown* | Providence, RI | Killewald | L 3–4 | 163 | 8–3–1 | |
| December 29 | 4:00 | at Providence* | Providence, RI | Killewald | W 3–0 | 112 | 9–3–1 | |
| December 30 | 4:30 | vs. New Hampshire* | Providence, RI | Killewald | L 5–6 | 123 | 9–4–1 | |
| January 6 | 7:00 | St. Lawrence* | Mariucci Arena • Minneapolis, MN | Killewald | W 6–1 | 1,086 | 10–4–1 | |
| January 7 | 7:00 | St. Lawrence* | Mariucci Arena • Minneapolis, MN | Killewald | W 5–0 | 906 | 11–4–1 | |
| January 15 | 7:00 | at Boston College* | Conte Forum • Boston, MA | Killewald | W 4–3 | 200 | 12–4–1 | |
| January 17 | 7:00 | at Brown* | Meehan Auditorium • Providence, RI | Killewald | L 1–3 | 157 | 12–5–1 | |
| January 18 | 3:01 | at Yale* | Ingalls Rink • New Haven, CT | Killewald | W 2–1 | 225 | 13–5–1 | |
| January 24 | 1:00 | Northeastern* | Mariucci Arena • Minneapolis, MN | Killewald | T 2–2 ^{OT} | 1,571 | 13–5–2 | |
| January 25 | 1:00 | Northeastern* | Mariucci Arena • Minneapolis, MN | Killewald | T 1–1 ^{OT} | 1,831 | 13–5–3 | |
| January 30 | 7:00 | Manitoba* | Mariucci Arena • Minneapolis, MN | Killewald | W 3–0 | 1,211 | 14–5–3 | |
| January 31 | 7:00 | Manitoba* | Mariucci Arena • Minneapolis, MN | Killewald | W 5–1 | 1,156 | 15–5–3 | |
| February 6 | 7:07 | at Augsburg* | Augsburg Ice Arena • Minneapolis, MN | Killewald | W 9–2 | 700 | 16–5–3 | |
| February 7 | 2:00 | Wisconsin (club)* | Mariucci Arena • Minneapolis, MN | Killewald | W 10–0 | 1,131 | 17–5–3 | |
| February 22 | 4:00 | Gustavus Adolphus* | Mariucci Arena • Minneapolis, MN | Harms | W 10–0 | 1,221 | 18–5–3 | |
| February 27 | 7:00 | Minnesota Thoroughbreds* | Mariucci Arena • Minneapolis, MN | Killewald | W 4–2 | 1,807 | 19–5–3 | |
| March 1 | 2:00 | Minnesota Blue J's* | Mariucci Arena • Minneapolis, MN | Killewald | W 6–1 | 1,937 | 20–5–3 | |
| March 8 | 2:00 | Augsburg* | Mariucci Arena • Minneapolis, MN | Killewald | W 10–2 | 919 | 21–5–3 | |
AWCHA Tournament
| March 20 | 5:00 | vs. New Hampshire* | FleetCenter • Boston, MA | Killewald | L 1–4 | 1,239 | 21–6–3 | |
| March 21 | 12:00 | vs. Northeastern* | FleetCenter • Boston, MA | Killewald | L 0–4 | 259 | 21–7–3 | |
*Non-conference game. ^{#}Rankings from USCHO.com Poll.

== Roster ==
| No. | Nat. | Player | Class | Pos | Height | DoB | Hometown | Previous team |
|---|---|---|---|---|---|---|---|---|
| 2 | | Hattie Hoff | Freshman | D | 5' 2" (1.57 m) | | Red Wing, Minnesota | Minnesota Thoroughbred |
| 3 | | Laura Tryba | Freshman | F | 5' 9" (1.75 m) | | Blaine, Minnesota | Blaine High School |
| 4 | | Nadine Muzerall | Freshman | F | 5' 7" (1.7 m) | 1978-10-19 | Mississauga, Ontario | Kimball Union Academy |
| 5 | | Dacia Lyons | Sophomore | D | 5' 6" (1.68 m) | | Cottage Grove, Wisconsin | Monona Grove High School |
| 6 | | Angela Borek | Sophomore | D | 5' 10" (1.78 m) | 1978-06-02 | Burnsville, Minnesota | Burnsville High School |
| 7 | | Sarma Pone | Freshman | F | 5' 7" (1.7 m) | 1979-05-05 | Minneapolis, Minnesota | Minneapolis Southwest High School |
| 8 | | Kelly Olson | Freshman | D | 5' 8" (1.73 m) | 1979-03-06 | Little Canada, Minnesota | Roseville Area High School |
| 9 | | Megan Milbert | Freshman | F | 5' 5" (1.65 m) | 1979-04-24 | South St. Paul, Minnesota | South St. Paul Secondary |
| 10 | | Kris Scholz | Sophomore | F | 5' 8" (1.73 m) | 1977-10-19 | Hugo, Minnesota | Stillwater Area High School |
| 11 | | Tai Thorsheim | Freshman | D | 5' 7" (1.7 m) | | Stillwater, Minnesota | Stillwater Area High School |
| 12 | | Matty Brekken | Freshman | F | 5' 5" (1.65 m) | 1980-06-30 | Devils Lake, North Dakota | Devils Lake High School |
| 13 | | Betsey Kukowski | Freshman | F | 5' 9" (1.75 m) | 1979-02-23 | Apple Valley, Minnesota | Shattuck-Saint Mary's |
| 14 | | Brittny Ralph | Sophomore | D | 5' 9" (1.75 m) | 1978-03-14 | Brooklyn Center, Minnesota | Brooklyn Center High School |
| | | Julie Otto | Senior | F | 5' 3" (1.6 m) | 1975-05-08 | Buffalo, Minnesota | Minnesota Thoroughbred |
| 17 | | Ambria Thomas | Freshman | F | 5' 6" (1.68 m) | 1978-12-30 | Fairbanks, Alaska | West Valley High School |
| 18 | | Emily Buchholz | Freshman | D | 5' 9" (1.75 m) | 1978-09-27 | Waupun, Wisconsin | Waupun High School |
| 19 | | Heather Alm | Freshman | F | 5' 8" (1.73 m) | 1979-02-22 | Woodbury, Minnesota | Woodbury High School |
| 20 | | Lacey Franzmeier | Freshman | F | 5' 6" (1.68 m) | 1979-05-20 | Stacy, Minnesota | Forest Lake Area High School |
| 21 | | Marisa Pettiford | Freshman | F | 5' 6" (1.68 m) | 1980-06-28 | Saint Paul, Minnesota | Minnesota Thoroughbred |
| 22 | | Paula Vogt | Freshman | F | 5' 5" (1.65 m) | | Richmond, Minnesota | Paynesville Trailblazers |
| 23 | | Tracy Donaghue | Freshman | F | 5' 3" (1.6 m) | 1979-01-12 | Maple Grove, Minnesota | Osseo Senior High School |
| 31 | | Sarah Harms | Sophomore | G | 5' 5" (1.65 m) | | Pengilly, Minnesota | Minnesota Thoroughbred |
| 36 | | Erica Killewald | Freshman | G | 5' 10" (1.78 m) | 1979-11-20 | Troy, Michigan | Troy High School |
