= 2006–07 Minnesota Golden Gophers women's ice hockey season =

- Conference: WCHA
- Home ice: Ridder Arena

Record
- Overall: 23–12–1
- Conference: 17–10–1
- Home: 15–5–0
- Road: 7–6–1
- Neutral: 1–1–0

Coaches and captains
- Head coach: Laura Halldorson
- Assistant coaches: Brad Frost
- Captain(s): Andrea Nichols; Bobbi Ross

The 2006–07 Minnesota Golden Gophers women's ice hockey season represented the University of Minnesota during the 2006–07 NCAA Division I women's ice hockey season.

== Offseason ==
- September 2007: Former Gopher women's hockey greats Erica Killewald and Nadine Muzerall (Class of 2001) were inducted into the University of Minnesota's M Club Hall of Fame on Sept. 27. Killewald and Muzerall were two of 13 Gopher greats to be inducted at the annual Hall of Fame Banquet. The duo were the first women's hockey players to be inducted into the hall of fame and the youngest in the group of 13.

== Regular season ==
=== Standings ===
2006–07 Western Collegiate Hockey Association standings
	Conference								Overall					
	GP	W	L	T	SOW	PTS	GF	GA	GP	W	L	T	GF	GA
Wisconsin†*	28	23	1	4	–	50	112	33	41	36	1	4	166	36
Minnesota Duluth	28	19	6	3	–	41	102	38	39	24	11	4	128	68
Minnesota	28	17	10	1	–	35	85	66	36	23	12	1	115	85
Ohio State	28	13	11	4	–	30	79	70	37	20	13	4	112	87
Minnesota State	28	12	14	2	–	26	78	91	35	16	17	2	108	106
Bemidji State	28	9	15	4	–	22	53	85	36	11	20	5	66	110
St. Cloud State	28	7	16	5	–	19	66	94	37	12	18	7	99	110
North Dakota	28	0	27	1	–	1	24	122	36	3	31	2	39	142
Championship: † indicates conference regular season champion; * indicates conference tournament champion Updated July 21, 2024

=== Schedule ===
As of September 14, 2024.

Date	Time	Opponent^{#}	Rank^{#}	Site	Decision	Result	Attendance	Record
Regular Season
October 6	7:07	Maine*		Ridder Arena • Minneapolis, MN	Chartier	W 5–2	844	1–0–0
October 7	7:10	New Hampshire*		Ridder Arena • Minneapolis, MN	Chartier	L 5–6 ^{OT}	1,139	1–1–0
October 13	6:07	Minnesota State		Ridder Arena • Minneapolis, MN	Chartier	W 4–1	869	2–1–0 (1–0–0)
October 14	3:07	Minnesota State		Ridder Arena • Minneapolis, MN	Chartier	W 5–2	1,110	3–1–0 (2–0–0)
October 21	2:07	at Wisconsin	#4	Kohl Center • Madison, WI	Chartier	L 1–3	910	3–2–0 (2–1–0)
October 22	2:07	at #1 Wisconsin	#4	Kohl Center • Madison, WI	Chartier	W 3–3 ^{OT}	970	3–2–1 (2–1–1)
October 27	7:07	at Ohio State	#6	Ohio State University Ice Rink • Columbus, OH	Chartier	W 4–1	361	4–2–1 (3–1–1)
October 28	7:07	at Ohio State	#6	Ohio State University Ice Rink • Columbus, OH	Chartier	L 1–2	308	4–3–1 (3–2–1)
November 3	7:07	Minnesota Duluth		Ridder Arena • Minneapolis, MN	Chartier	W 5–3	1,430	5–3–1 (4–2–1)
November 4	7:07	Minnesota Duluth		Ridder Arena • Minneapolis, MN	Chartier	W 1–0	1,545	6–3–1 (5–2–1)
November 11	1:07	Niagara*	#4	Ridder Arena • Minneapolis, MN	Chartier	W 4–3	710	7–3–1 (5–2–1)
November 12	1:07	Niagara*	#4	Ridder Arena • Minneapolis, MN	Chartier	W 3–1	901	8–3–1 (5–2–1)
November 17	2:07	at St. Cloud State	#4	Herb Brooks National Hockey Center • St. Cloud, MN	Chartier	W 5–2	349	9–3–1 (6–2–1)
November 18	4:07	St. Cloud State	#4	Ridder Arena • Minneapolis, MN	Chartier	W 4–1	1,149	10–3–1 (7–2–1)
December 1	7:07	at Bemidji State	#4	John S. Glas Field House • Bemidji, MN	Chartier	W 4–1	516	11–3–1 (8–2–1)
December 2	2:07	at Bemidji State	#4	Ridder Arena • Minneapolis, MN	Hanlon	W 3–2	428	12–3–1 (9–2–1)
December 9	2:07	at North Dakota	#4	Ralph Engelstad Arena • Grand Forks, ND	Chartier	W 8–1	754	13–3–1 (10–2–1)
December 10	2:07	at North Dakota	#4	Ralph Engelstad Arena • Grand Forks, ND	Hanlon	W 1–0	212	14–3–1 (11–2–1)
January 5	7:07	#2 Wisconsin	#4	Ridder Arena • Minneapolis, MN	Chartier	L 1–4	2,273	14–4–1 (11–3–1)
January 6	4:07	#2 Wisconsin	#4	Ridder Arena • Minneapolis, MN	Hanlon	L 0–3	3,251	14–5–1 (11–4–1)
January 12	7:07	Ohio State		Ridder Arena • Minneapolis, MN	Hanlon	L 1–7	1,092	14–6–1 (11–5–1)
January 13	7:07	Ohio State		Ridder Arena • Minneapolis, MN	Hanlon	W 3–1	1,083	15–6–1 (12–5–1)
January 19	7:07	at Minnesota State	#7	Midwest Wireless Civic Center • Mankato, MN	Hanlon	L 2–3	300	15–7–1 (12–6–1)
January 20	3:07	at Minnesota State	#7	Midwest Wireless Civic Center • Mankato, MN	Hanlon	L 3–4	689	15–8–1 (12–7–1)
January 27	3:07	North Dakota	#8	Ridder Arena • Minneapolis, MN	Hanlon	W 4–0	1,224	16–8–1 (13–7–1)
January 28	3:07	North Dakota	#8	Ridder Arena • Minneapolis, MN	Hanlon	W 5–1	1,541	17–8–1 (14–7–1)
February 2	7:07	St. Cloud State	#8	Ridder Arena • Minneapolis, MN	Hanlon	W 4–0	1,232	18–8–1 (15–7–1)
February 3	7:07	at St. Cloud State	#8	Herb Brooks National Hockey Center • St. Cloud, MN	Hanlon	W 6–4	641	19–8–1 (16–7–1)
February 9	7:07	Bemidji State		Ridder Arena • Minneapolis, MN	Hanlon	L 0–2	1,075	19–9–1 (16–8–1)
February 10	3:07	Bemidji State		Ridder Arena • Minneapolis, MN	Hanlon	W 5–3	1,080	20–9–1 (17–8–1)
February 17	3:07	at #7 Minnesota Duluth	#8	Duluth Entertainment Convention Center • Duluth, MN	Hanlon	L 1–7	1,372	20–10–1 (17–9–1)
February 18	3:07	at #7 Minnesota Duluth	#8	Duluth Entertainment Convention Center • Duluth, MN	Hanlon	L 1–5	1,427	20–11–1 (17–10–1)
WCHA Tournament
February 23	7:07	Bemidji State*	#9	Ridder Arena • Minneapolis, MN (WCHA Tournament, First Round, Game 1)	Hanlon	W 5–1	385	21–11–1 (17–10–1)
February 24	6:07	Bemidji State*	#9	Ridder Arena • Minneapolis, MN (WCHA Tournament, First Round, Game 2)	Hanlon	W 4–1	–	22–11–1 (17–10–1)
March 3	4:07	Minnesota Duluth*	#9	Ridder Arena • Minneapolis, MN (WCHA Semifinal)	Hanlon	W 3–2 ^{OT}	1,343	23–11–1 (17–10–1)
March 4	1:07	Wisconsin*		Ridder Arena • Minneapolis, MN (WCHA Championship)	Hanlon	L 1–3	1,157	23–12–1 (17–10–1)
*Non-conference game. ^{#}Rankings from USCHO.com Poll.

=== News and notes ===
- Kelli Blankenship was in her freshman season and appeared in every game. For the season, she scored nine goals and six assists for 15 points (including three power-play goals and one game-winning goal). On October 7, she scored two goals in an overtime loss against New Hampshire. Against WCHA rival Ohio State, she notched two goals in the 4–1 win (played on October 27). The weekend of December 9 and 10, Blankenship had a stellar series against North Dakota. She earned a career-high three points in the 8–1 win on December 9, and then she scored the Gophers’ only goal in the 1–0 win the next day.
- Melanie Gagnon was in her sophomore season and missed two games to compete with the Canadian Under-22 Team in January. Her five goals and 22 assists for 27 points, ranked first among defensemen. She ranked sixth in WCHA in scoring among defensemen. During the Easton Shootout (played on October 6 and 7), she had three assists. Her first power-play goal of the season was scored on October 27 in a 4–1 win over Ohio State. In an 8–1 victory over North Dakota, she scored a goal and an assist (game played on December 1). • Posted five points against North Dakota and was later named the WCHA Defensive Player of the Week for her performance (1/27-28) • Netted a career-best goal and two assists for three points in the 5–1 win against UND (1/28) •
- Gigi Marvin was in her sophomore season. She led the team in scoring with 38 points (she ranked second on the team in goals (18), while her 20 assists ranked third). On the power play, she led the team with 10 power-play goals and 11 assists for 21 points. In addition, she netted six game-winning goals. During the season, she had six and seven game scoring streaks this season. The six game streak was from Nov. 12 – Dec 10, while the seven game streak was from Jan. 13 – Feb. 3. She held a .600 percent on the faceoff circle with 345 wins and 230 losses, a team best. To start the season, Marvin had a power-play goal against Maine (played on October 6) and would get her first game-winning goal of the season in the 4–1 win against Ohio State (played on October 27). Marvin had five points in the North Dakota series (played on January 27 and 28). In the series against St. Cloud State on February 2 and 3, Marvin would accumulate another five points. On February 10, she netted the game-winning goal in the 5–3 win over Bemidji State
- Dagney Willey was in her sophomore season and played in all 34 games for the Gophers to earn second letter. She posted four goals and 10 assists for 14 points and tied for second on the team in plus/minus rating. On October 22, she scored a goal and had five shots in the 3–3 tie against Wisconsin. She scored the first power-play goal of her career in a 4–1 win over St. Cloud State on November 18. In the 5–1 win over North Dakota on January 28, she tied a career-high with two assists.

=== Roster ===
No.	Nat.	Player	Class	Pos	Height	DoB	Hometown	Previous team
2		Whitney Graft	Junior	F	5' 4" (1.63 m)		Wayzata, Minnesota	Wayzata High School
3		Melanie Gagnon	Sophomore	D	5' 5" (1.65 m)	1986-06-11	St. Adolphe, Manitoba	St. Norbert Collegiate High School
4		Andrea Nichols	Senior	F	5' 2" (1.57 m)		Mountain Iron, Minnesota	Hibbing High School
6		Rachael Drazan	Junior	D	5' 6" (1.68 m)	1986-01-11	Orono, Minnesota	Benilde-St. Margaret's
7		Kelli Blankenship	Freshman	F	5' 6" (1.68 m)	1987-06-23	Lusby, Maryland	North American Hockey Academy
8		Bobbi Ross	Junior	F	5' 7" (1.7 m)		Verwood, Saskatchewan	Collège Mathieu
9		Jaimie Horton	Freshman	F	5' 7" (1.7 m)	1988-04-24	Maple Grove, Minnesota	Maple Grove High School
10		Brittany Francis	Freshman	F	5' 7" (1.7 m)	1987-12-02	Thunder Bay, Ontario	Toronto Jr. Aeros
11		Lindsay Block	Sophomore	F	5' 5" (1.65 m)		Chaska, Minnesota	Chaska High School
13		Maggie Souba	Senior	F/D	5' 5" (1.65 m)		Moorhead, Minnesota	Moorhead High School
14		Tiffany Johnson	Freshman	F	5' 6" (1.68 m)		Plymouth, Minnesota	Wayzata High School
15		Anya Miller	Junior	D	5' 8" (1.73 m)		Elk River, Minnesota	Elk River High School
16		Jenelle Philipczyk	Junior	F	5' 5" (1.65 m)		Woodbury, Minnesota	Eagan High School
17		Becky Wacker	Senior	F	5' 4" (1.63 m)		York, Maine	York High School
19		Gigi Marvin	Sophomore	F	5' 8" (1.73 m)	1987-03-07	Warroad, Minnesota	Warroad High School
20		Alexandra Zebro	Freshman	D	6' 0" (1.83 m)	1988-06-16	Oak Grove, Minnesota	Faithful Family Academy
22		Erica McKenzie	Junior	F	5' 8" (1.73 m)		Hastings, Minnesota	Hastings High School
23		Dagney Willey	Sophomore	D	5' 5" (1.65 m)		Maple Grove, Minnesota	Osseo Senior High School
26		Michelle Maunu	Freshman	D	5' 6" (1.68 m)	1987-07-15	Esko, Minnesota	Esko High School
32		Brittany Krause	Freshman	G	5' 4" (1.63 m)		Hibbing, Minnesota	Hibbing High School
33		Brittony Chartier	Sophomore	G	6' 0" (1.83 m)		Saskatoon, Saskatchewan	Bishop Carroll High School, Calgary Oval X-Treme
39		Kim Hanlon	Sophomore	G	5' 6" (1.68 m)		Blaine, Minnesota	Blaine High School

== Postseason ==
- February 23–24: Melanie Gagnon tallied three points against Bemidji State in the first round of the WCHA playoffs.
- On March 3, Gagnon scored an unassisted goal in the WCHA semifinal game against Minnesota Duluth. Gigi Marvin scored a power-play, game-winning goal in the overtime period to advance the Gophers to the WCHA Championship game. Dagney Willey allied a power-play assist in the 3–2 WCHA semifinal win over Minnesota Duluth.

== International ==
- Kelli Blankenship competed at the USA Hockey Winter Training Camp.
- Melanie Gagnon, Canadian Under 22 Team
- Gigi Marvin played for the U.S. Select Team at the 2006 Four Nation’s Cup and was later named to Team USA’s 2007 National Team, where she earned a silver medal at the IIHF Women’s World Hockey Championships

== Awards and honors ==
- Kelli Blankenship, WCHA Rookie of the Week (Week of October 29)
- Kelli Blankenship, WCHA Rookie of the Week (Week of December 11)
- Melanie Gagnon, All-WCHA Third Team selection
- Melanie Gagnon, WCHA All-Academic and Academic All-Big Ten honoree
- Gigi Marvin, All-WCHA First Team honoree
- Gigi Marvin, WCHA Scholar Athlete
- Gigi Marvin, WCHA All-Academic and Academic All-Big Ten honoree
- Gigi Marvin, co-most valuable player, (along with Bobbi Ross)
- Gigi Marvin, WCHA All-Tournament Team
- Gigi Marvin, WCHA Offensive Player of the Week (week of February 4)
- Dagney Willey, Ridder Award
- Dagney Willey, WCHA All-Academic and Academic All-Big Ten honoree
