= 1998–99 Minnesota Golden Gophers women's ice hockey season =

- Conference: AWCHA

Record
- Overall: 29–4–3
- Home: 14–3–2
- Road: 7–0–1
- Neutral: 8–1

Coaches and captains
- Head coach: Laura Halldorson
- Captain(s): Amber Hegland; Kris Scholz

In the 1998–99 season, the Golden Gophers had a third-place finish at the 1999 AWCHA National Championship.

== Regular season ==
=== Schedule ===
Source.

Date	Time	Opponent	Site	Decision	Result	Attendance	Record	Ref
Regular Season
October 30	7:10	at Minnesota State*	Mankato Civic Center • Mankato, MN	Killewald	W 11–1	1,067	1–0–0	
November 5	7:05	Harvard*	Mariucci Arena • Minneapolis, MN	Killewald	L 1–3	1,315	1–1–0	
November 7	1:30	New Hampshire*	Mariucci Arena • Minneapolis, MN	Killewald	T 1–1 ^{OT}	1,216	1–1–1	
November 14	2:00	at Bemidji State*	Sanford Center • Bemidji, MN	Nicholas	W 10–0	280	2–1–1	
November 15	2:00	at Minnesota Duluth*	Duluth Entertainment Convention Center • Duluth, MN	Nicholas	W 10–0	110	3–1–1	
November 20	7:00	Minnesota State*	Mariucci Arena • Minneapolis, MN	Killewald	W 8–1	1,227	4–1–1	
November 27	5:00	vs. Northeastern*	Hobey Baker Memorial Rink • Princeton, NJ	Killewald	W 5–2	55	5–1–1	
November 28	5:00	at Princeton*	Hobey Baker Memorial Rink • Princeton, NJ	Killewald	W 3–1	115	6–1–1	
November 29	11:30	vs. Queen's*	Hobey Baker Memorial Rink • Princeton, NJ	Nicholas	W 10–0	85	7–1–1	
December 3	7:00	Gustavus Adolphus*	Mariucci Arena • Minneapolis, MN	Nicholas	W 8–1	781	8–1–1	
December 18	7:00	at Manitoba*	Wayne Fleming Arena • Winnipeg, MB	Killewald	W 3–1	56	9–1–1	
December 19	10:11	vs. Alberta*	Wayne Fleming Arena • Winnipeg, MB	Nicholas	W 9–2	37	10–1–1	
December 20	11:05	vs. Alberta*	Wayne Fleming Arena • Winnipeg, MB	Killewald	W 8–2	42	11–1–1	
January 9	7:00	St. Cloud State*	Mariucci Arena • Minneapolis, MN	Nicholas	W 10–0	1,356	12–1–1	
January 15	5:00	vs. St. Lawrence*	Olympic Center Ice Rink • Lake Placid, NY	Killewald	W 5–0	181	13–1–1	
January 16	8:00	vs. Concordia*	Olympic Center Ice Rink • Lake Placid, NY	Killewald	W 6–4	153	14–1–1	
January 17	5:00	vs. Toronto*	Olympic Center Ice Rink • Lake Placid, NY	Killewald	W 5–1	138	15–1–1	
January 22	7:03	Wilfrid Laurier*	Mariucci Arena • Minneapolis, MN	Killewald	W 10–0	745	16–1–1	
January 23	7:00	Wilfrid Laurier*	Mariucci Arena • Minneapolis, MN	Nicholas	W 7–1	921	17–1–1	
January 29	5:00	vs. Concordia*	Whittemore Center • Durham, NH	Killewald	W 3–0	191	18–1–1	
January 30	2:30	at New Hampshire*	Whittemore Center • Durham, NH	Killewald	T 0–0 ^{OT}	703	18–1–2	
January 31	12:00	vs. Beatrice Aeros*	Mariucci Arena • Minneapolis, MN	Killewald	L 0–9	170	18–2–2	
February 5	7:05	Cornell*	Mariucci Arena • Minneapolis, MN	Killewald	W 6–1	916	19–2–2	
February 6	7:05	Cornell*	Mariucci Arena • Minneapolis, MN	Killewald	W 5–0	1445	20–2–2	
February 7	3:05	Minnesota State*	Mariucci Arena • Minneapolis, MN	Nicholas	W 4–0	903	21–2–2	
February 13	7:05	Augsburg*	Augsburg Ice Arena • Minneapolis, MN	Nicholas	W 10–0	300	22–2–2	
February 14	4:05	at Minnesota State*	Mankato Civic Center • Mankato, MN	Killewald	W 10–1	196	23–2–2	
February 20	2:36	Providence*	Mariucci Arena • Minneapolis, MN	Killewald	W 1–0	1,125	24–2–2	
February 21	1:05	Providence*	Mariucci Arena • Minneapolis, MN	Killewald	W 5–1	1,341	25–2–2	
February 26	7:05	Brown*	Mariucci Arena • Minneapolis, MN	Killewald	L 1–2	2,579	25–3–2	
February 27	7:05	Brown*	Mariucci Arena • Minneapolis, MN	Killewald	T 1–1 ^{OT}	1,359	25–3–3	
March 7	1:05	St. Cloud State*	Mariucci Arena • Minneapolis, MN	Nicholas	W 10–0	359	26–3–3	
March 11	7:05	Minnesota State*	Mariucci Arena • Minneapolis, MN	Killewald	W 6–0	415	27–3–3	
March 22	7:00	Olympic Development Program*	Mariucci Arena • Minneapolis, MN	Killewald	W 10–1	704	28–3–3	
AWCHA Tournament
March 26	8:22	New Hampshire*	Mariucci Arena • Minneapolis, MN (AWCHA Semifinals)	Killewald	L 2–3 ^{OT}	2,447	28–4–3	
March 27	4:08	Brown*	Mariucci Arena • Minneapolis, MN (AWCHA Third-Place Game)	Killewald	W 3–2	2,507	29–4–3	
*Non-conference game. ^{#}Rankings from USCHO.com Poll.

- November 1998: Minnesota captured the title at the Princeton Thanksgiving tournament, with a 5–2 win over Northeastern, a 3–1 victory over host Princeton, and a 10–0 rout against Queens. Nadine Muzerall had eight points (two goals, six assists) in the three games, including a goal and three assists in the game over Northeastern. Muzerall scored that game's opening goal, as well as assisting on the game-winner. With the six assists on the weekend, Muzerall tied the tournament career assists record of 12 held by Cammi Granato. With the wins, Minnesota passed Northeastern to take fourth place in the latest U.S. College Hockey Online Women's Poll.
- During that sophomore season, Erica Killewald held opponents to two or fewer goals in 23 of 26 starts and led nation in goals against average (1.24) and save percentage (.947).

== Roster ==
No.	Nat.	Player	Class	Pos	Height	DoB	Hometown	Previous team
2		Courtney Kennedy	Sophomore	D	5' 9" (1.75 m)	1979-03-29	Woburn, Massachusetts	Buckingham Browne & Nichols School
3		Shannon Kennedy	Junior	F	5' 10" (1.78 m)	1977-11-14	Woburn, Massachusetts	Buckingham Browne & Nichols School
4		Nadine Muzerall	Sophomore	F	5' 7" (1.7 m)	1978-10-19	Mississauga, Ontario	Kimball Union Academy
5		Winny Brodt	Sophomore	D	5' 5" (1.65 m)	1978-02-18	Roseville, Minnesota	Roseville Area High School
6		Angela Borek	Sophomore	D	5' 10" (1.78 m)	1978-06-02	Burnsville, Minnesota	Burnsville High School
7		Sarma Pone	Sophomore	F	5' 7" (1.7 m)	1979-05-05	Minneapolis, Minnesota	Minneapolis Southwest High School
8		Kelly Olson	Sophomore	D	5' 8" (1.73 m)	1979-03-06	Little Canada, Minnesota	Roseville Area High School
9		Megan Milbert	Sophomore	F	5' 5" (1.65 m)	1979-04-24	South Saint Paul, Minnesota	South St. Paul Secondary
10		Kris Scholz	Sophomore	F	5' 8" (1.73 m)	1977-10-19	Hugo, Minnesota	Stillwater Area High School
11		Tai Thorsheim	Sophomore	D	5' 7" (1.7 m)		Stillwater, Minnesota	Stillwater Area High School
12		Matty Brekken	Sophomore	F	5' 5" (1.65 m)	1980-06-30	Devils Lake, North Dakota	Devils Lake High School
13		Betsey Kukowski	Sophomore	F	5' 9" (1.75 m)	1979-02-23	Apple Valley, Minnesota	Shattuck-Saint Mary's
14		Brittny Ralph	Sophomore	D	5' 9" (1.75 m)	1978-03-14	Brooklyn Center, Minnesota	Brooklyn Center High School
16		Jenny Schmidgall	Freshman	F	5' 3" (1.6 m)	1979-01-12	Edina, Minnesota	Edina High School
18		Emily Buchholz	Sophomore	D	5' 9" (1.75 m)	1978-09-27	Waupun, Wisconsin	Waupun High School
19		Amber Hegland	Senior	F	5' 6" (1.68 m)		Farmington, Minnesota	Farmington High School
20		Lacey Franzmeier	Sophomore	F	5' 6" (1.68 m)	1979-05-20	Stacy, Minnesota	Forest Lake Area High School
21		Laura Slominski	Freshman	F	5' 3" (1.6 m)	1980-06-28	Burnsville, Minnesota	Burnsville High School
23		Tracy Donaghue	Sophomore	F	5' 3" (1.6 m)	1979-01-12	Maple Grove, Minnesota	Osseo Senior High School
24		Tracy Engstrom	Freshman	F	5' 6" (1.68 m)	1980-02-17	Willmar, Minnesota	Willmar High School
27		Ambria Thomas	Sophomore	F	5' 6" (1.68 m)	1978-10-30	Fairbanks, Alaska	West Valley High School
35		Crystal Nicholas	Freshman	G	5' 7" (1.7 m)	1980-07-15	Tulsa, Oklahoma	Union High School
36		Erica Killewald	Sophomore	G	5' 10" (1.78 m)	1979-11-20	Troy, Michigan	Troy High School

== Awards and honors ==
- Erica Killewald 1999 AWCHA National Championship, All Tournament Honors
- Erica Killewald, Golden Gophers most improved and most valuable player
- Nadine Muzerall, USCHO.com, Offensive Player Of the Week (Week of December 1, 1998)
- Nadine Muzerall, 1999 American Women's College Hockey Alliance All-Americans, Second Team
- Nadine Muzerall, Second Team AWCHA All-American
