= 2002–03 Minnesota Golden Gophers women's ice hockey season =

2003 NCAA tournament, Lost semifinals vs Harvard (1–6) Lost third-place game vs. Dartmouth (2–4)
- Conference: WCHA

Record
- Overall: 27–8–1
- Conference: 19–4–1
- Home: 11–2–1
- Road: 15–3
- Neutral: 1–3

Coaches and captains
- Head coach: Laura Halldorson (6th season)
- Assistant coaches: Joel Johnson; Brad Frost
- Captain(s): Ronda Curtin; Kelsey Bills; Winny Brodt

The 2002–03 Minnesota Golden Gophers women's ice hockey season represented the University of Minnesota during the 2002–03 NCAA Division I women's ice hockey season.

== Regular season ==
=== Standings ===
2002–03 Western Collegiate Hockey Association standings
| | Conference | | | | | | | | Overall | | | | | |
| | GP | W | L | T | SOW | PTS | GF | GA | GP | W | L | T | GF | GA |
|---|---|---|---|---|---|---|---|---|---|---|---|---|---|---|
| Minnesota Duluth†* | 24 | 21 | 2 | 1 | – | 43 | 166 | 42 | 36 | 31 | 3 | 2 | 226 | 65 |
| Minnesota | 24 | 19 | 4 | 1 | – | 39 | 101 | 41 | 36 | 27 | 8 | 1 | 153 | 76 |
| Wisconsin | 24 | 14 | 6 | 4 | – | 32 | 79 | 50 | 35 | 22 | 8 | 5 | 110 | 67 |
| Ohio State | 24 | 8 | 13 | 3 | – | 19 | 56 | 76 | 37 | 12 | 22 | 3 | 88 | 114 |
| Bemidji State | 24 | 5 | 13 | 6 | – | 16 | 49 | 104 | 33 | 9 | 17 | 7 | 75 | 123 |
| St. Cloud State | 24 | 5 | 19 | 0 | – | 10 | 48 | 124 | 34 | 11 | 23 | 0 | 75 | 149 |
| Minnesota State | 24 | 3 | 18 | 3 | – | 9 | 41 | 103 | 34 | 10 | 21 | 3 | 77 | 118 |
Championship: † indicates conference regular season champion; * indicates conference tournament champion Updated July 20, 2024

=== Schedule ===
As of July 26, 2024.

| Date | Opponent | Site | Decision | Result | Attendance | Record |
Regular Season
| October 12 | at University of Findlay* | Findlay, OH | Horak | W 8–1 | 100 | 1–0–0 |
| October 13 | at University of Findlay* | Findlay, OH | Horak | W 7–2 | 75 | 2–0–0 |
| October 18 | at St. Cloud State | Herb Brooks National Hockey Center • St. Cloud, MN | Horak | W 10–1 | 232 | 3–0–0 (1–0–0) |
| October 19 | St. Cloud State | Ridder Arena • Minneapolis, MN | Horak | W 8–0 | 3,239 | 4–0–0 (2–0–0) |
| October 25 | at Ohio State | Ohio State University Ice Rink • Columbus, OH | Horak | W 4–0 | 237 | 5–0–0 (3–0–0) |
| October 26 | at Ohio State | Ohio State University Ice Rink • Columbus, OH | Reinen | W 2–1 | 339 | 6–0–0 (4–0–0) |
| November 1 | Wisconsin | Ridder Arena • Minneapolis, MN | Horak | W 3–1 | 1,155 | 7–0–0 (5–0–0) |
| November 2 | Wisconsin | Ridder Arena • Minneapolis, MN | Horak | W 2–1 | 1,624 | 8–0–0 (6–0–0) |
| November 8 | Bemidji State | Ridder Arena • Minneapolis, MN | Horak | W 4–1 | 1,139 | 9–0–0 (7–0–0) |
| November 9 | Bemidji State | Ridder Arena • Minneapolis, MN | Reinen | T 2–2 ^{OT} | 1,037 | 9–0–1 (7–0–1) |
| November 16 | Brown* | Ridder Arena • Minneapolis, MN | Horak | W 5–3 | 1,369 | 10–0–1 (7–0–1) |
| November 17 | Harvard* | Ridder Arena • Minneapolis, MN | Horak | W 4–3 | 1,716 | 11–0–1 (7–0–1) |
| November 22 | at St. Lawrence* | Appleton Arena • Canton, NY | Horak | W 5–2 | 543 | 12–0–1 (7–0–1) |
| November 23 | at St. Lawrence* | Appleton Arena • Canton, NY | Reinen | W 7–2 | 444 | 13–0–1 (7–0–1) |
| November 30 | Minnesota Duluth | Ridder Arena • Minneapolis, MN | Horak | L 3–4 | 3,056 | 13–1–1 (7–1–1) |
| December 1 | Minnesota Duluth | Ridder Arena • Minneapolis, MN | Reinen | L 5–6 | 2,416 | 13–2–1 (7–2–1) |
| December 7 | at Minnesota State | Midwest Wireless Civic Center • Mankato, MN | Horak | W 5–2 | 198 | 14–2–1 (8–2–1) |
| December 8 | at Minnesota State | Midwest Wireless Civic Center • Mankato, MN | Horak | W 3–1 | 188 | 15–2–1 (9–2–1) |
| January 10 | at St. Cloud State | Herb Brooks National Hockey Center • St. Cloud, MN | Horak | W 2–1 | 181 | 16–2–1 (10–2–1) |
| January 11 | St. Cloud State | Ridder Arena • Minneapolis, MN | Reinen | W 10–2 | 2,110 | 17–2–1 (11–2–1) |
| January 17 | at Dartmouth* | Thompson Arena • Hanover, NH | Horak | L 3–6 | 590 | 17–3–1 (11–2–1) |
| January 28 | at New Hampshire* | Whittemore Center • Durham, NH | Horak | W 4–0 | – | 18–3–1 (11–2–1) |
| February 1 | at Bemidji State | John S. Glas Field House • Bemidji, MN | Horak | W 7–0 | 136 | 19–3–1 (12–2–1) |
| February 2 | at Bemidji State | John S. Glas Field House • Bemidji, MN | Reinen | W 7–2 | 216 | 20–3–1 (13–2–1) |
| February 7 | Ohio State | Ridder Arena • Minneapolis, MN | Horak | W 5–3 | 2,071 | 21–3–1 (14–2–1) |
| February 8 | Ohio State | Ridder Arena • Minneapolis, MN | Horak | W 2–1 | 2,423 | 22–3–1 (15–2–1) |
| February 14 | at Minnesota Duluth | DECC Arena • Duluth, MN | Reinen | L 1–7 | 1,034 | 22–4–1 (15–3–1) |
| February 15 | at Minnesota Duluth | DECC Arena • Duluth, MN | Horak | W 4–2 | 1,139 | 23–4–1 (16–3–1) |
| February 22 | Minnesota State | Ridder Arena • Minneapolis, MN | Horak | W 5–1 | 1,829 | 24–4–1 (17–3–1) |
| February 23 | Minnesota State | Ridder Arena • Minneapolis, MN | Reinen | W 4–0 | 2,024 | 25–4–1 (18–3–1) |
| February 28 | at Wisconsin | Kohl Center • Middleton, WI | Horak | L 1–2 | 563 | 25–5–1 (18–4–1) |
| March 1 | at Wisconsin | Kohl Center • Middleton, WI | Horak | W 2–0 | 718 | 26–5–1 (19–4–1) |
WCHA Tournament
| March 7 | vs. Wisconsin* | Ralph Engelstad Arena • Grand Forks, ND (WCHA Final Faceoff, Semifinal Game) | Horak | W 3–1 | 523 | 27–5–1 (19–4–1) |
| March 8 | vs. Minnesota Duluth* | Ralph Engelstad Arena • Grand Forks, ND (WCHA Final Faceoff, Championship Game) | Horak | L 3–5 | 647 | 27–6–1 (19–4–1) |
NCAA Tournament
| March 21 | vs. Harvard* | DECC Arena • Duluth, MN (NCAA Frozen Four) | Horak | L 1–6 | – | 27–7–1 (19–4–1) |
| March 23 | vs. Dartmouth* | DECC Arena • Duluth, MN (NCAA Frozen Four, Championship Game) | Horak | L 2–4 | – | 27–8–1 (19–4–1) |
*Non-conference game. ^{#}Rankings from USCHO.com Poll.

=== Roster ===
| No. | Nat. | Player | Class | Pos | Height | DoB | Hometown | Previous team |
|---|---|---|---|---|---|---|---|---|
| 1 | | Brenda Reinen | Sophomore | G | 5' 6" (1.68 m) | 1983-00-00 | Sun Prairie, Wisconsin | Sun Prairie High School |
| 3 | | Jerilyn Glenn | Junior | F | 5' 9" (1.75 m) | 1981-00-00 | Ham Lake, Minnesota | Forest Lake Area High School |
| 4 | | Chelsey Brodt | Freshman | D | 5' 4" (1.63 m) | 1983-12-07 | Roseville, Minnesota | Roseville Area High School |
| 5 | | Winny Brodt (A) | Senior | D | 5' 5" (1.65 m) | 1978-02-18 | Roseville, Minnesota | Roseville Area High School |
| 7 | | Krissy Wendell | Freshman | F | 5' 6" (1.68 m) | 1981-09-12 | Brooklyn Park, Minnesota | Park Center Senior High School |
| 8 | | Noelle Sutton | Sophomore | F | 5' 8" (1.73 m) | 1982-00-00 | Maple Grove, Minnesota | Maple Grove Senior High School |
| 9 | | Ronda Curtin (C) | Senior | D | 5' 10" (1.78 m) | 1980-11-02 | Roseville, Minnesota | Roseville Area High School |
| 10 | | Krista Johnson | Freshman | F/D | 5' 8" (1.73 m) | 1984-00-00 | Blaine, Minnesota | Blaine High School |
| 11 | | Ashley Albrecht | Freshman | D | 5' 4" (1.63 m) | 1984-00-00 | South St. Paul, Minnesota | South St. Paul Secondary |
| 12 | | Stacy Troumbly | Sophomore | D | 5' 2" (1.57 m) | 1983-00-00 | Bovey, Minnesota | Hibbing High School |
| 14 | | La Toya Clarke | Junior | F | 5' 3" (1.6 m) | 1981-06-11 | Pickering, Ontario | Dunbarton High School |
| 15 | | Kelsey Bills (A) | Junior | F/D | 5' 3" (1.6 m) | 1982-00-00 | Carstairs, Alberta | Hugh Sutherland High School |
| 17 | | Cecilia Retelle | Junior | D | 5' 9" (1.75 m) | 1982-06-16 | Madison, Wisconsin | Culver Academy |
| 18 | | Kelly Stephens | Sophomore | F | 5' 6" (1.68 m) | 1983-06-04 | Shoreline, Washington | Shorewood High School |
| 19 | | Melissa Coulombe | Junior | D | 5' 4" (1.63 m) | 1982-00-00 | St-Pierre-Jolys, Manitoba | St. Pierre Collegiate |
| 20 | | Natalie Darwitz | Freshman | F | 5' 2" (1.57 m) | 1983-10-13 | Eagan, Minnesota | Eagan High School |
| 21 | | Allie Sanchez | Freshman | F/D | 5' 6" (1.68 m) | 1984-00-00 | Saint Paul, Minnesota | Johnson Senior High School |
| 22 | | Gwen Anderson | Senior | F | 5' 3" (1.6 m) | 1980-09-08 | North St. Paul, Minnesota | North St. Paul High School |
| 27 | | Jody Horak | Sophomore | G | 5' 7" (1.7 m) | 1982-00-00 | Blaine, Minnesota | Blaine High School |
| 29 | | Kristy Oonincx | Sophomore | F | 5' 7" (1.7 m) | 1983-09-09 | Moose Jaw, Saskatchewan | College of Notre Dame |
