= 2001–02 Minnesota Golden Gophers women's ice hockey season =

College ice hockey team season

- Conference: 1 WCHA

Record
- Overall: 28–4–6
- Conference: 19–2–3
- Home: 14–1–3
- Road: 12–2–2
- Neutral: 2–1–1

Coaches and captains
- Head coach: Laura Halldorson
- Captain(s): Tracy Engstrom; Laura Slominski

In the 2001–02 season, the Golden Gophers ice hockey team represented the University of Minnesota during the 2001–02 NCAA Division I women's ice hockey season.

== Offseason ==
=== Recruiting ===
Player	Position	Nationality	Notes
Brenda Reinen	Goaltender	United States	Played at Sun Prairie High School
Noelle Sutton	Forward	United States	Played at Maple Grove High School
Renee Curtin	Forward	United States	Played for Roseville Area High School
Stacy Troumbly	Defense	United States	Played for Hibbing High School
La Toya Clarke	Forward	Canada	Played for Dunbarton High School
Kelly Stephens	Forward	United States	Played for Shorewood High School
Kate Swenson	Defense	United States	Played for Maple Grove High School
Laura Cecko	Forward	United States	Played for Blaine High School
Jody Horak	Forward	United States	Played for Blaine High School
Kristy Oonincx	Forward	Canada	Played for College of Notre Dame
Stephanie Johnson	Goaltender	United States	Played for Minneapolis South High School

== Regular season ==
=== Standings ===
2001–02 Western Collegiate Hockey Association standings
	Conference								Overall					
	GP	W	L	T	SOW	PTS	GF	GA	GP	W	L	T	GF	GA
Minnesota†*	24	19	2	3	–	41	84	34	38	28	4	6	126	59
Minnesota Duluth	24	16	5	3	–	35	92	35	34	24	6	4	133	58
Wisconsin	24	17	6	1	–	35	76	36	35	22	11	2	110	51
Ohio State	24	9	12	3	–	21	53	59	37	18	15	4	90	91
Bemidji State	24	7	11	6	–	20	64	84	33	12	13	8	97	104
St. Cloud State	24	6	17	1	–	13	57	109	34	7	26	1	74	152
Minnesota State	24	1	22	1	–	3	26	95	32	4	26	2	38	110
Championship: † indicates conference regular season champion; * indicates conference tournament champion Updated July 20, 2024

=== Schedule ===
Source.

Date	Time	Opponent	Site	Decision	Result	Attendance	Record	Ref
Regular Season
October 12	7:05	Minnesota State	Mariucci Arena • Minneapolis, MN	Johnson	W 2–0	631	1–0–0 (1–0–0)	
October 13	7:05	Minnesota State	Mariucci Arena • Minneapolis, MN	Johnson	W 4–1	617	2–0–0 (2–0–0)	
October 20	2:05	at Minnesota Duluth	Duluth Entertainment Convention Center • Duluth, MN	Johnson	L 0–7	850	2–1–0 (2–1–0)	
October 21	2:05	at Minnesota Duluth	Duluth Entertainment Convention Center • Duluth, MN	Reinen	T 1–1 ^{OT}	650	2–1–1 (2–1–1)	
October 26	7:05	at Mercyhurst*	Mercyhurst Ice Center • Erie, PA	Reinen	W 2–1 ^{OT}	195	3–1–1 (2–1–1)	
October 27	7:05	at Niagara*	Dwyer Arena • Niagara, NY	Reinen	L 1–2	679	3–2–1 (2–1–1)	
November 2	7:05	Ohio State	Mariucci Arena • Minneapolis, MN	Reinen	W 2–1	658	4–2–1 (3–1–1)	
November 3	7:05	Ohio State	Mariucci Arena • Minneapolis, MN	Horak	W 3–2	711	5–2–1 (4–1–1)	
November 10	2:05	Bemidji State	Mariucci Arena • Minneapolis, MN	Reinen	W 2–2 ^{OT}	935	5–2–2 (4–1–2)	
November 11	2:05	Bemidji State	Mariucci Arena • Minneapolis, MN	Horak	W 9–0	683	6–2–2 (5–1–2)	
November 17	2:00	at Brown*	Meehan Auditorium • Providence, RI	Horak	W 3–2	222	7–2–2 (5–1–2)	
November 18	2:00	at Harvard*	Bright Hockey Center • Cambridge, MA	Reinen	W 3–2	175	8–2–2 (5–1–2)	
November 24	2:05	Dartmouth*	Mariucci Arena • Minneapolis, MN	Horak	W 3–2 ^{OT}	803	9–2–2 (5–1–2)	
November 25	1:05	New Hampshire*	Mariucci Arena • Minneapolis, MN	Horak	T 3–3 ^{OT}	676	9–2–3 (5–1–2)	
November 30	7:05	at Wisconsin	Middleton, WI	Horak	W 4–1	313	10–2–3 (6–1–2)	
December 1	7:05	at Wisconsin	Middleton, WI	Johnson	W 4–3 ^{OT}	379	11–2–3 (7–1–2)	
December 14	7:05	St. Cloud State	Mariucci Arena • Minneapolis, MN	Horak	W 7–2	912	12–2–3 (8–1–2)	
January 5	3:07	at St. Cloud State	Herb Brooks National Hockey Center • St. Cloud, MN	Reinen	W 5–1	119	13–2–3 (9–1–2)	
January 7	7:05	St. Lawrence*	Mariucci Arena • Minneapolis, MN	Horak	W 3–2	567	14–2–3 (9–1–2)	
January 8	7:05	St. Lawrence*	Mariucci Arena • Minneapolis, MN	Horak	T 3–3 ^{OT}	632	14–2–4 (9–1–2)	
January 12	2:04	at Bemidji State	John S. Glas Field House • Bemidji, MN	Reinen	T 2–2 ^{OT}	186	14–2–5 (9–1–3)	
January 13	2:02	at Bemidji State	John S. Glas Field House • Bemidji, MN	Horak	W 3–2 ^{OT}	186	15–2–5 (10–1–3)	
January 18	7:05	Minnesota Duluth	Mariucci Arena • Minneapolis, MN	Reinen	W 1–0	1,751	16–2–5 (11–1–3)	
January 19	7:05	Minnesota Duluth	Mariucci Arena • Minneapolis, MN	Horak	W 3–1	2,255	17–2–5 (12–1–3)	
January 26	2:05	University of Findlay*	Mariucci Arena • Minneapolis, MN	Reinen	W 7–1	735	18–2–5 (12–1–3)	
January 27	2005	University of Findlay*	Mariucci Arena • Minneapolis, MN	Horak	W 4–0	731	19–2–5 (12–1–3)	
February 1	7:05	at Minnesota State	Midwest Wireless Civic Center • Mankato, MN	Horak	W 3–0	127	20–2–5 (13–1–3)	
February 2	7:05	at Minnesota State	Midwest Wireless Civic Center • Mankato, MN	Reinen	W 6–1	147	21–2–5 (14–1–3)	
February 8	7:05	at Ohio State	Ohio State University Ice Rink • Columbus, OH	Horak	W 5–0	255	22–2–5 (15–1–3)	
February 9	7:05	at Ohio State	Ohio State University Ice Rink • Columbus, OH	Reinen	W 2–1 ^{OT}	347	23–2–5 (16–1–3)	
February 16	2:05	Wisconsin	Mariucci Arena • Minneapolis, MN	Horak	L 0–2	1,346	23–3–5 (16–2–3)	
February 17	2:05	Wisconsin	Mariucci Arena • Minneapolis, MN	Reinen	W 3–2 ^{OT}	1,529	24–3–5 (17–2–3)	
March 1	7:05	St. Cloud State	Mariucci Arena • Minneapolis, MN	Horak	W 4–1	1,327	25–3–5 (18–2–3)	
March 2	8:08	at St. Cloud State	Herb Brooks National Hockey Center • St. Cloud State, MN	Reinen	W 9–1	247	26–3–5 (19–2–3)	
WCHA Tournament
March 8	7:05	vs. Ohio State*	Fogerty Arena • Blaine, MN (WCHA Final Faceoff, Semifinal Game)	Horak	W 4–1	–	27–3–5 (19–2–3)	
March 9	7:20	vs. *	Fogerty Arena • Blaine, MN (WCHA Final Faceoff, Championship Game)	Reinen	W 3–2	–	28–3–5 (19–2–3)	
NCAA Tournament
March 22	8:35	vs. Brown*	Whittemore Center • Durham, NH (NCAA Frozen Four)	Horak	L 1–2	2,051	28–4–5 (19–2–3)	
March 24	12:30	vs. Niagara*	Whittemore Center • Durham, NH (NCAA Consolation Game)	Reinen	T 2–2	–	28–4–6 (19–2–3)	
*Non-conference game. ^{#}Rankings from USCHO.com Poll.

== Roster ==
No.	Nat.	Player	Class	Pos	Height	DoB	Hometown	Previous team
1		Brenda Reinen	Freshman	G	5' 6" (1.68 m)	1983-00-00	Sun Prairie, Wisconsin	Sun Prairie High School
3		Jerilyn Glenn	Sophomore	F	5' 9" (1.75 m)	1981-00-00	Ham Lake, Minnesota	Forest Lake Area High School
6		Sarma Pone	Senior	F/D	5' 7" (1.7 m)	1979-05-05	Minneapolis, Minnesota	Minneapolis Southwest High School
8		Noelle Sutton	Freshman	F	5' 8" (1.73 m)	1982-00-00	Maple Grove, Minnesota	Maple Grove High School
9		Ronda Curtin	Junior	F	5' 8" (1.73 m)	1980-11-02	Roseville, Minnesota	Roseville Area High School
11		Renee Curtin	Freshman	F	5' 8" (1.73 m)	1983-01-06	Roseville, Minnesota	Roseville Area High School
12		Stacy Troumbly	Freshman	D	5' 2" (1.57 m)	1983-00-00	Bovey, Minnesota	Hibbing High School
14		La Toya Clarke	Freshman	F	5' 3" (1.6 m)	1981-06-11	Pickering, Ontario	Dunbarton High School
15		Kelsey Bills	Sophomore	F/D	5' 3" (1.6 m)	1982-00-00	Carstairs, Alberta	Hugh Sutherland High School
16		Tracy Palinsky	Sophomore	F	5' 5" (1.65 m)	1981-00-00	Port Elgin, Ontario	Notre Dame Secondary
17		Cecilia Retelle	Sophomore	D	5' 9" (1.75 m)	1982-06-16	Madison, Wisconsin	Culver Academy
18		Kelly Stephens	Freshman	F	5' 6" (1.68 m)	1983-06-04	Shoreline, Washington	Shorewood High School
19		Melissa Coulombe	Sophomore	D	5' 4" (1.63 m)	1982-00-00	St-Pierre-Jolys, Manitoba	St. Pierre Collegiate
21		Laura Slominski	Senior	F	5' 3" (1.6 m)	1980-06-28	Burnsville, Minnesota	Burnsville High School
22		Gwen Anderson	Junior	F	5' 3" (1.6 m)	1980-09-08	North St. Paul, Minnesota	North St. Paul High School
23		Rachel Allen	Sophomore	D	5' 5" (1.65 m)		Rosemount, Minnesota	Rosemount High School
24		Tracy Engstrom	Senior	F	5' 6" (1.68 m)	1980-02-17	Willmar, Minnesota	Willmar High School
25		Kate Swenson	Freshman	D	5' 8" (1.73 m)	1983-07-01	Maple Grove, Minnesota	Maple Grove High School
26		Laura Cecko	Freshman	F	5' 5" (1.65 m)	1983-06-28	Coon Rapids, Minnesota	Blaine High School
27		Jody Horak	Freshman	F	5' 7" (1.7 m)	1982-00-00	Blaine, Minnesota	Blaine High School
29		Kristy Oonincx	Freshman	F	5' 7" (1.7 m)	1983-09-09	Moose Jaw, Saskatchewan	College of Notre Dame
35		Stephanie Johnson	Freshman	G	5' 7" (1.7 m)	1982-06-23	Brooklyn Center, Minnesota	Minneapolis South High School
