= 1999–2000 Minnesota Golden Gophers women's ice hockey season =

College ice hockey team season

1998–99 Minnesota Golden Gophers women's ice hockey season

AWCHA National Champions
- Conference: WCHA

Record
- Overall: 32–6–1
- Conference: 21–2–1
- Home: 15–3–0
- Road: 13–2–1
- Neutral: 4–1–0

Coaches and captains
- Head coach: Laura Halldorson
- Captain(s): Shannon Kennedy; Kris Scholz

In the 1999–2000 season, the Golden Gophers ice hockey team from the University of Minnesota won its first women’s national team title at the AWCHA National Championship. Nadine Muzerall scored the game-winning goal in the 4–2 national championship win over Brown Bears and earned all-tournament honors with three goals and an assist in two games. For the season, Muzerall owned totals of 49 goals, 28 assists and 77 points.

Muzerall’s 49 goals, 16 power-play goals and 1.29 goals-per-game were school records. In a 10–0 win over Bemidji State, she set school records with five goals and seven points, during a season which saw her go on a 20-game point streak.

== Regular season ==
=== Standings ===
1999–2000 Western Collegiate Hockey Association standings
	Conference								Overall					
	GP	W	L	T	SOW	PTS	GF	GA	GP	W	L	T	GF	GA
Minnesota Duluth†*	24	21	1	2	–	44	170	42	33	25	5	3	196	62
Minnesota	24	21	2	1	–	43	150	35	39	32	6	1	206	69
Wisconsin	24	15	8	1	–	31	88	83	35	19	14	2	119	134
Ohio State	24	6	15	3	–	15	45	74	37	8	26	3	59	126
St. Cloud State	24	6	15	3	–	15	39	120	35	13	19	3	83	154
Bemidji State	24	5	17	2	–	12	54	117	35	15	18	2	119	138
Minnesota State	24	3	19	2	–	8	46	119	35	8	25	2	89	165
Championship: † indicates conference regular season champion; * indicates conference tournament champion Updated July 14, 2024

=== Schedule ===
Source.

Date	Time	Opponent	Site	Decision	Result	Attendance	Record	Ref
Regular Season
October 15	7:05	St. Cloud State	Mariucci Arena • Minneapolis, MN	Killewald	W 10–1	1,180	1–0–0 (1–0–0)	
October 16	3:05	at St. Cloud State	St. Cloud, MN	Nicholas	W 10–1	179	2–0–0 (2–0–0)	
October 23	2:00	at Providence*	Providence, RI	Killewald	W 3–1	250	3–0–0 (2–0–0)	
October 24	2:00	at Providence*	Providence, RI	Killewald	L 0–1	250	3–1–0 (2–0–0)	
October 29	7:00	at Northeastern*	Boston, MA	Killewald	W 3–1	213	4–1–0 (2–0–0)	
October 30	7:00	at Northeastern*	Boston	Killewald	L 1–4	197	4–2–0 (2–0–0)	
November 5	7:05	Brown*	Mariucci Arena • Minneapolis, MN	Killewald	W 4–0	1,128	5–2–0 (2–0–0)	
November 7	2:05	Harvard*	Mariucci Arena • Minneapolis, MN	Killewald	L 3–8	1,261	5–3–0 (2–0–0)	
November 12	7:05	at Ohio State	Columbus, OH	Killewald	W 3–0	249	6–3–0 (3–0–0)	
November 13	7:05	at Ohio State	Columbus, OH	Killewald	W 7–1	303	7–3–0 (4–0–0)	
November 19	7:05	at Wisconsin	Madison, WI	Nicholas	W 7–4	530	8–3–0 (5–0–0)	
November 20	7:05	at Wisconsin	Madison, WI	Nicholas	W 5–0	732	9–3–0 (6–0–0)	
November 23	7:05	Minnesota State	Mariucci Arena • Minneapolis, MN	Nicholas	W 7–1	688	10–3–0 (7–0–0)	
December 3	7:05	Minnesota Duluth	Mariucci Arena • Minneapolis, MN	Killewald	L 4–5	1,620	10–4–0 (7–1–0)	
December 4	7:05	Minnesota Duluth	Mariucci Arena • Minneapolis, MN	Killewald	L 0–1	1,673	10–5–0 (7–2–0)	
December 11	2:10	Dartmouth*	Mariucci Arena • Minneapolis, MN	Killewald	W 5–4	851	11–5–0 (7–2–0)	
December 12	1:05	Dartmouth*	Mariucci Arena • Minneapolis, MN	Killewald	W 4–3	1,181	12–5–0 (7–2–0)	
January 10	7:08	at Bemidji State	Bemidji, MN	Killewald	W 4–2	261	13–5–0 (8–2–0)	
January 11	7:05	at Bemidji State	Bemidji, MN	Killewald	W 11–1	1,128	14–5–0 (9–2–0)	
January 14	2:05	at Minnesota State	Mankato, MN	Nicholas	W 7–1	123	15–5–0 (10–2–0)	
January 15	2:05	at Minnesota State	Mankato, MN	Killewald	W 10–0	252	16–5–0 (11–2–0)	
January 21	7:05	Bemidji State	Mariucci Arena • Minneapolis, MN	Nicholas	W 6–1	755	17–5–0 (12–2–0)	
January 22	7:05	Bemidji State	Mariucci Arena • Minneapolis, MN	Killewald	W 10–0	1,007	18–5–0 (13–2–0)	
January 29	1:05	New Hampshire*	Mariucci Arena • Minneapolis, MN	Killewald	W 6–2	904	19–5–0 (13–2–0)	
January 30	1:05	New Hampshire*	Mariucci Arena • Minneapolis, MN	Nicholas	W 5–4	1,128	20–5–0 (13–2–0)	
February 4	7:05	Ohio State	Mariucci Arena • Minneapolis, MN	Killewald	W 4–1	1,103	21–5–0 (14–2–0)	
February 5	7:05	Ohio State	Mariucci Arena • Minneapolis, MN	Nicholas	W 6–0	1,021	22–5–0 (15–2–0)	
February 8	7:05	Minnesota State	Mariucci Arena • Minneapolis, MN	Nicholas	W 8–3	804	23–5–0 (16–2–0)	
February 11	7:05	at Minnesota Duluth	Duluth, MN	Killewald	W 4–3	952	24–5–0 (17–2–0)	
February 12	7:05	at Minnesota Duluth	Duluth, MN	Killewald	T 2–2	1,041	24–5–1 (17–2–1)	
February 18	7:05	St. Cloud State	Mariucci Arena • Minneapolis, MN	Killewald	W 5–0	923	25–5–1 (18–2–1)	
February 19	3:05	at St. Cloud State	St. Cloud, MN	Nicholas	W 5–2	314	26–5–1 (19–2–1)	
February 26	2:05	Wisconsin	Mariucci Arena • Minneapolis, MN	Killewald	W 11–3	1,367	27–5–1 (20–2–1)	
February 27	2:05	Wisconsin	Mariucci Arena • Minneapolis, MN	Nicholas	W 4–2	1,687	28–5–1 (21–2–1)	
WCHA Tournament
March 2	12:00	vs. Minnesota State*	Bloomington, MN (WCHA Quarterfinal)	Nicholas	W 10–0	652	29–5–1 (21–2–1)	
March 3	3:30	vs. Wisconsin*	Bloomington, MN (WCHA Semifinal)	Killewald	W 5–0	746	30–5–1 (21–2–1)	
March 4	7:00	vs. Minnesota Duluth*	Bloomington, MN (WCHA Championship)	Killewald	L 0–2	1,826	30–6–1 (21–2–1)	
AWCHA Tournament
March 24	8:00	vs. Minnesota Duluth*	Boston, MA (AWCHA Semifinal)	Killewald	W 3–2	1,409	31–6–1 (21–2–1)	
March 25	7:00	vs. Brown*	Boston, MA (AWCHA Championship)	Killewald	W 4–2	2,249	32–6–1 (21–2–1)	
*Non-conference game. ^{#}Rankings from USCHO.com Poll.

== Roster ==
No.	Nat.	Player	Class	Pos	Height	DoB	Hometown	Previous team
2		Courtney Kennedy	Junior	D	5' 9" (1.75 m)	1979-03-29	Woburn, Massachusetts	Buckingham Browne & Nichols School
3		Shannon Kennedy	Senior	F	5' 10" (1.78 m)	1977-11-14	Woburn, Massachusetts	Buckingham Browne & Nichols School
4		Nadine Muzerall	Junior	F	5' 7" (1.7 m)	1978-10-19	Mississauga, Ontario	Kimball Union Academy
5		Winny Brodt	Junior	D	5' 5" (1.65 m)	1978-02-18	Roseville, Minnesota	Roseville Area High School
6		Angela Borek	Junior	D	5' 10" (1.78 m)	1978-06-02	Burnsville, Minnesota	Burnsville High School
7		Sarma Pone	Junior	F	5' 7" (1.7 m)	1979-05-05	Minneapolis, Minnesota	Minneapolis Southwest High School
8		Kelly Olson	Junior	D	5' 8" (1.73 m)	1979-03-06	Little Canada, Minnesota	Roseville Area High School
9		Megan Milbert	Junior	F	5' 5" (1.65 m)	1979-04-24	South Saint Paul, Minnesota	South St. Paul Secondary
10		Kris Scholz	Junior	F	5' 8" (1.73 m)	1977-10-19	Hugo, Minnesota	Stillwater Area High School
16		Betsey Kukowski	Junior	F	5' 9" (1.75 m)	1979-02-23	Apple Valley, Minnesota	Shattuck-Saint Mary's
18		Emily Buchholz	Junior	D	5' 9" (1.75 m)	1978-09-27	Waupun, Wisconsin	Waupun High School
20		Lacey Franzmeier	Junior	F	5' 6" (1.68 m)	1979-05-20	Stacy, Minnesota	Forest Lake Area High School
21		Laura Slominski	Sophomore	F	5' 3" (1.6 m)	1980-06-28	Burnsville, Minnesota	Burnsville High School
22		Gwen Anderson	Freshman	F	5' 3" (1.6 m)	1980-09-08	North Saint Paul, Minnesota	North Saint Paul High School
23		Tracy Donaghue	Junior	F	5' 3" (1.6 m)	1979-01-12	Maple Grove, Minnesota	Osseo Senior High School
24		Tracy Engstrom	Sophomore	F	5' 6" (1.68 m)	1980-02-17	Willmar, Minnesota	Willmar High School
26		Alyson Sundberg	Freshman	F	5' 7" (1.7 m)	1981-04-08	Roseville, Minnesota	Roseville Area High School
27		Ambria Thomas	Junior	F	5' 6" (1.68 m)	1978-10-30	Fairbanks, Alaska	West Valley High School
29		Ronda Curtin	Freshman		5' 10" (1.78 m)	1980-11-02	Roseville, Minnesota	Roseville Area High School
35		Crystal Nicholas	Sophomore	G	5' 7" (1.7 m)	1980-07-15	Tulsa, Oklahoma	Union High School
36		Erica Killewald	Junior	G	5' 10" (1.78 m)	1979-11-20	Troy, Michigan	Troy High School

== Awards and honors ==
- Nadine Muzerall led the nation in goals (49)
- Nadine Muzerall led the nation in power-play goals (16)
- Nadine Muzerall led the nation in power-play points (27)
- Nadine Muzerall led the nation in game-winning goals (9)
- Nadine Muzerall, First Team All-WCHA
- Nadine Muzerall, Minnesota team most valuable player honors
