= Laura Halldorson =

American ice hockey player and coach

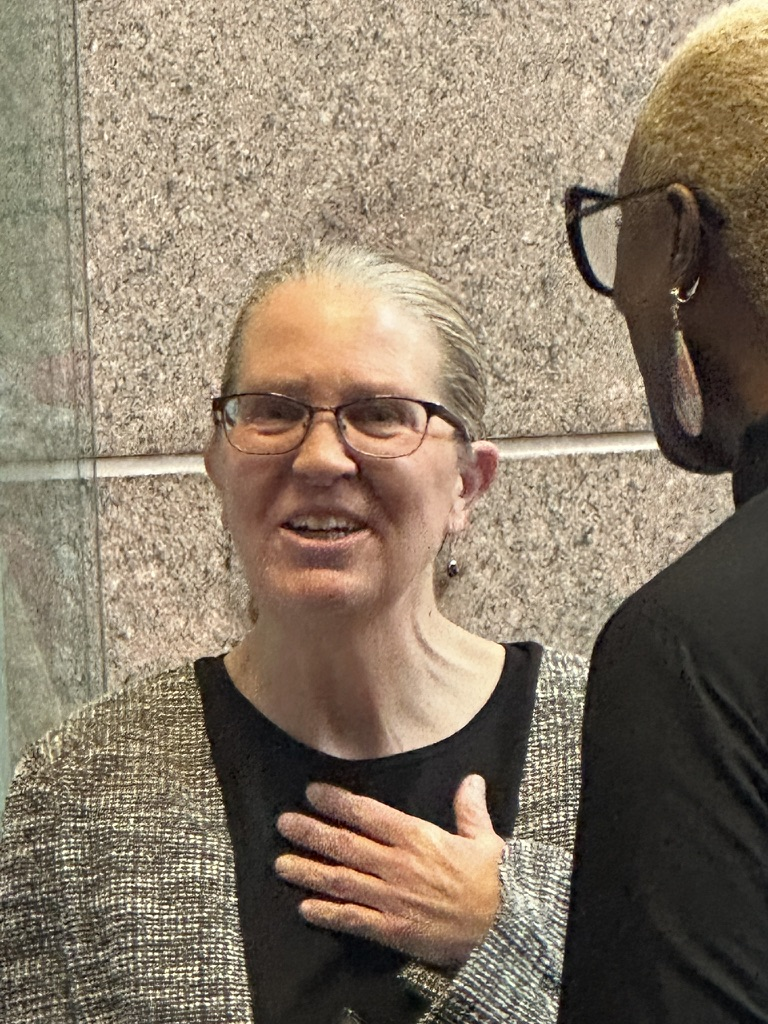
- Laura Halldorson in 2025

Biographical details
- Born: January 12, 1963 (age 63); Plymouth, Minnesota, US
- Education: Princeton University

Playing career
- 1981–1985: Princeton Tigers
- Position: Forward

Coaching career (HC unless noted)
- 1988–1990: Princeton (assistant)
- 1990–1997: Colby
- 1997–2007: Minnesota

Head coaching record
- Overall: Minnesota, 278–67–22

Accomplishments and honors

Championships
- AWCHA (2000); WCHA Final Faceoff (2002, 2004, 2005); NCAA National Collegiate (2004, 2005)

Awards
- 1996 ECAC Co-Coach of the Year; 3× AHCA Coach of the Year (1998, 2002, 2004); 2011 AHCA Founders Award
Medal record
Women's ice hockey
Representing United States
World Tournament (unofficial)
Bronze medal – third place	1987 Canada

Laura Halldorson (born January 12, 1963) is an American retired women's college ice hockey player and head coach. She was the first head coach of the University of Minnesota Golden Gophers Women's Hockey team, leading the new team to national prominence in her ten seasons. Her Minnesota record was 278–67–22, a winning percentage of .787. During that time, the Gophers won three national championships and four Western Collegiate Hockey Association (WCHA) championships, averaged 28 wins per season, and appeared in eight of ten national championship tournaments.

== Playing career ==
She played for the Princeton Tigers women's ice hockey program with Patty Kazmaier. In addition, she played with Cindy Curley and Lauren Apollo on the earliest U.S. National teams, including at the 1987 World Women's Hockey Tournament.

== Coaching career ==
After working on her thesis at Princeton, Halldorson coached girls' volleyball, basketball and softball through the Wayzata School District in Wayzata, Minnesota. In 1987, Princeton head coach Bob Ewell contacted Halldorson and asked her to become an assistant coach with the Tigers' program.

Halldorson later became a head coach at Colby College. As head coach of the White Mules, the team was one of only two non-Division I schools in the 12-team Eastern Collegiate Athletic Conference. In 1995–96, Halldorson led the White Mules to a 12–9–1 overall record.

On November 2, 1997, Halldorson coached her first game with the Minnesota Golden Gophers. The team played in front of a women’s intercollegiate hockey record crowd of 6,854. Halldorson was successful in leading the Gophers to winning its inaugural game. The result was an 8–0 triumph over Augsburg College. In the postseason, the Gophers finished fourth in the first-ever women’s ice hockey national championship. Halldorson was named the inaugural AHCA Coach of the Year in 1998.

On November 2, 2002, Halldorson won her 200th career game. Her last season with the Minnesota Golden Gophers was in 2006–07. Halldorson led the Golden Gophers to a third-place finish in the Western Collegiate Hockey Association regular season. In the postseason, her team defeated Bemidji State in the first round. In the semi-finals, the Gophers defeated Minnesota Duluth, 3–2 in overtime to advance to their fifth-straight WCHA Championship game. The WCHA championship would be Halldorson’s last game as Gophers coach. It was a 3–1 loss to Wisconsin in the title game. Halldorson’s record was 23–12–1 overall and 17–10–1 in conference office. Despite losing the WCHA championship, the Gophers were ranked ninth overall nationally.

Five of the players she coached at Minnesota would later become Olympians: Natalie Darwitz, Courtney Kennedy, Lyndsay Wall, Kelly Stephens, and Krissy Wendell.

== Coaching record ==
Year	School	Wins	Losses	Ties	League	Postseason
1997–98	Minnesota	21	7	3	AWCHA	Fourth
1998–99	Minnesota	29	4	3	AWCHA	Third
1999–2000	Minnesota	32	6	1	AWCHA	AWCHA Champions
2000–01	Minnesota	23	9	2	WCHA	WCHA Champions
2001–02	Minnesota	28	4	6	WCHA	WCHA Champions, NCAA Frozen Four
2002–03	Minnesota	27	8	1	WCHA	NCAA Frozen Four
2003–04	Minnesota	30	4	2	WCHA	NCAA Champions
2004–05	Minnesota	36	2	2	WCHA	NCAA Champions
2005–06	Minnesota	29	11	1	WCHA	NCAA Frozen Four
2006–07	Minnesota	23	12	1	WCHA	Second, WCHA Tournament

== Awards and honors ==
- 1996 ECAC Co-Coach of the Year honors
- New England Hockey Writers’ 1996 Coach of the Year
- 3× AHCA Coach of the Year (1998, 2002, 2004)
- 2011 AHCA Women's Ice Hockey Founders Award

== See also ==
- List of college women's ice hockey career coaching wins leaders
