= 2004–05 Harvard Crimson women's ice hockey season =

NCAA Frozen Four, Runner-up
- Conference: ECAC
- Home ice: Bright Hockey Center

Record

Coaches and captains
- Head coach: Katey Stone

The 2004–05 Harvard Crimson women’s ice hockey team played in the NCAA championship game for the third consecutive season. In addition, the Crimson won their seventh straight Beanpot and third league tournament title. Harvard was ranked No. 2 in the nation for the third consecutive season.

== Regular season ==
- In the 2004 part of the campaign, the Crimson had a 7-6-1 start. After January 1, Stone led the team to an 18-0-2 finish. The Crimson qualified for their third straight Frozen Four appearance despite losing graduating Patty Kazmaier Award winners from the past two seasons.
- Nicole Corriero set new NCAA record by scoring 59 goals on the season. This broke the old mark of 51. In 36 games, Corriero scored a goal in 28 of them, while scoring at least a point in 33 games. During the season, she had 19 multiple-goal games and six hat tricks. Her 91 points accounted for over 60 percent of the Crimson’s total offense, which was ranked fourth in the nation. In addition, she passed A.J. Mlezcko for third on Harvard’s all-time scoring list with 265 career points.

== Postseason ==
=== 2005 ECAC Tournament ===
Round	Opponent	Score
Quarterfinal	# 8 Clarkson	5-0
Quarterfinal	# 8 Clarkson	3-1
Semifinal	# 4 Yale	2-1 (OT)
Final	# 2 Dartmouth	4-1

=== NCAA Frozen Four ===
In the NCAA quarterfinal. the Mercyhurst Lakers women's ice hockey program had the lead versus Harvard. Nicole Corriero would score four goals, including the game-tying goal to force overtime. The Crimson would eliminate the Lakers in triple-overtime.

In the NCAA Championship game, the Crimson were facing a 4-3 deficit. With four seconds remaining, Nicole Corriero shot the puck in hopes of tying the game. The shot was blocked by Minnesota defenseman Lyndsay Wall as the Golden Gophers won the match.

== Awards and honors ==
- Julie Chu, 2004-05 USCHO.com Defensive Forward of the Year
- Nicole Corriero, Harvard University Female Athlete of the Year
- Nicole Corriero, 2005 Sarah Devens Award
- Nicole Corriero, 2005 ECAC Tournament Most Valuable Player,
- Nicole Corriero, NCAA leader, 2004-05 season, Goals per game, 1.64
- Katey Stone, ECAC Hockey Coach of the Year
- Katey Stone, USCHO.com Coach of the Year
