= 1999–2000 Brown Bears women's ice hockey season =

American college ice hockey team season

The 1999-2000 Brown Bears women's ice hockey team represented Brown University.

== Regular season ==
- Courtney Johnson played her first season with Brown. In 1998, she suffered a knee injury and missed the season. For the season, she registered seventeen points (nine goals and eight assists).
- Kristy Zamora had twenty-one points (twelve goals and nine assists). Of her 12 goals, four were scored in ECAC and AWCHA Tournament play.

== Awards and honors ==
- Ali Brewer, 2000 ECAC Tournament Most Valuable Player
- Courtney Johnson: Ivy League Rookie of the Week on March 7 (part of the recognition included two goals versus Princeton)
- Courtney Johnson: Sakuma Award winner (based on perfect attendance at all practices and games).
- Kristy Zamora: Ivy League Player of the Week on December 13 (she scored two goals versus Harvard, resulting in a 4-4 tie)
- Kristy Zamora: Sakuma Award winner
