= 2000–01 Minnesota Golden Gophers women's ice hockey season =

College ice hockey team season

- Conference: 1 WCHA

Record
- Overall: 23–9–2
- Conference: 18–4–2
- Home: 13–1–0
- Road: 10–6–2
- Neutral: 0–2–0

Coaches and captains
- Head coach: Laura Halldorson
- Captain(s): Tracy Engstrom; Kris Scholz

In the 2000–01 season, the Golden Gophers ice hockey team represented the University of Minnesota during the 2000–01 NCAA Division I women's ice hockey season.

== Offseason ==
=== Recruiting ===
Player	Position	Nationality	Notes
Jerilynn Glenn	Forward	United States	Played at Forest Lake Area High School
La Toya Clarke	Forward	Canada	Played at Dunbarton High School
Kelsey Bills	Forward	Canada	Played at High Sutherland High School
Cecilia Retelle	Defender	United States	Played for Culver Academy
Melissa Coulombe	Defender	Canada	Played for St. Pierre Collegiate
Tracy Palinsky	Forward	Canada	Played at Notre Dame Secondary
Stefanie Snow	Defender	United States	Played for Cushing Academy
Stephanie Johnson	Goaltender	United States	Played at Minneapolis South High School

== Regular season ==
=== Standings ===
2000–01 Western Collegiate Hockey Association standings
	Conference								Overall					
	GP	W	L	T	SOW	PTS	GF	GA	GP	W	L	T	GF	GA
Minnesota†	24	18	4	2	–	38	114	49	34	23	9	2	135	75
Minnesota Duluth*	24	15	5	4	–	34	125	60	37	28	5	4	200	82
Wisconsin	24	13	6	5	–	31	100	64	35	21	9	5	145	94
St. Cloud State	24	12	10	2	–	26	92	94	35	17	16	2	131	133
Ohio State	24	11	10	3	–	25	76	65	37	18	16	3	119	96
Bemidji State	24	6	17	1	–	13	62	142	34	9	24	1	93	183
Minnesota State	24	0	23	1	–	1	18	113	35	2	31	2	32	147
Championship: † indicates conference regular season champion; * indicates conference tournament champion Updated July 17, 2024

=== Schedule ===
Source.

Date	Time	Opponent	Site	Decision	Result	Attendance	Record	Ref
Regular Season
October 14	3:05	at St. Cloud State	Herb Brooks National Hockey Center • St. Cloud, MN	Killewald	W 4–1	187	1–0–0 (1–0–0)	
October 15	3:05	at St. Cloud State	Herb Brooks National Hockey Center • St. Cloud, MN	Killewald	W 5–4	807	2–0–0 (2–0–0)	
October 21	2:05	Ohio State	Mariucci Arena • Minneapolis, MN	Killewald	W 6–2	757	3–0–0 (3–0–0)	
October 22	2:05	Ohio State	Mariucci Arena • Minneapolis, MN	Killewald	L 2–4	703	3–1–0 (3–1–0)	
October 27	7:05	at Minnesota State	Midwest Wireless Civic Center • Mankato, MN	Killewald	W 2–1	171	4–1–0 (4–1–0)	
October 28	2:35	at Minnesota State	Midwest Wireless Civic Center • Mankato, MN	Johnson	W 6–1	203	5–1–0 (5–1–0)	
November 4	2:00	at Brown*	Meehan Auditorium • Providence, RI	Killewald	L 2–3 ^{OT}	350	5–2–0 (5–1–0)	
November 6	2:00	at Harvard*	Bright Hockey Center • Cambridge, MA	Killewald	W 3–2	112	6–2–0 (5–1–0)	
November 10	7:05	Minnesota Duluth	Mariucci Arena • Minneapolis, MN	Killewald	W 4–0	1,512	7–2–0 (6–1–0)	
November 11	7:05	Minnesota Duluth	Mariucci Arena • Minneapolis, MN	Killewald	W 8–0	1,632	8–2–0 (7–1–0)	
November 24	7:05	at Wisconsin	Middleton, WI	Killewald	W 5–2	643	9–2–0 (8–1–0)	
November 25	7:05	at Wisconsin	Middleton, WI	Killewald	T 4–4 ^{OT}	422	9–2–1 (8–1–1)	
December 1	7:05	Bemidji State	Mariucci Arena • Minneapolis, MN	Killewald	W 9–1	935	10–2–1 (9–1–1)	
December 2	7:05	Bemidji State	Mariucci Arena • Minneapolis, MN	Johnson	W 8–4	931	11–2–1 (10–1–1)	
December 9	1:00	at Dartmouth*	Thompson Arena • Hanover, NH	Killewald	L 1–5	525	11–3–1 (10–1–1)	
December 10	1:00	at Dartmouth*	Thompson Arena • Hanover, NH	Killewald	L 0–4	457	11–4–1 (10–1–1)	
January 6	2:05	Mercyhurst*	Mariucci Arena • Minneapolis, MN	Killewald	W 3–0	561	12–4–1 (10–1–1)	
January 7	1:05	Niagara*	Mariucci Arena • Minneapolis, MN	Killewald	W 4–2	621	13–4–1 (10–1–1)	
January 13	2:05	Minnesota State	Mariucci Arena • Minneapolis, MN	Killewald	W 4–0	921	14–4–1 (11–1–1)	
January 14	2:05	Minnesota State	Mariucci Arena • Minneapolis, MN	Johnson	W 3–0	745	15–4–1 (12–1–1)	
January 26	7:00	at New Hampshire*	Whittemore Center • Durham, NH	Killewald	W 2–1	553	16–4–1 (12–1–1)	
January 27	3:00	at New Hampshire*	Whittemore Center • Durham, NH	Killewald	W 3–1	651	17–4–1 (12–1–1)	
February 2	7:05	at Bemidji State	John S. Glas Field House • Bemidji, MN	Killewald	W 6–1	203	18–4–1 (13–1–1)	
February 3	7:05	at Bemidji State	John S. Glas Field House • Bemidji, MN	Johnson	W 8–5	158	19–4–1 (14–1–1)	
February 9	7:05	St. Cloud State	Mariucci Arena • Minneapolis, MN	Killewald	W 7–1	1,131	20–4–1 (15–1–1)	
February 10	7:08	at St. Cloud State	Herb Brooks National Hockey Center • St. Cloud, MN	Killewald	L 6–7	387	20–5–1 (15–2–1)	
February 16	7:05	at Ohio State	Ohio State University Ice Rink • Columbus, OH	Killewald	L 0–1	264	20–6–1 (15–3–1)	
February 17	7:05	at Ohio State	Ohio State University Ice Rink • Columbus, OH	Killewald	W 5–2	237	21–6–1 (16–3–1)	
February 24	2:05	Wisconsin	Mariucci Arena • Minneapolis, MN	Killewald	W 6–2	1,403	22–6–1 (17–3–1)	
February 25	2:05	Wisconsin	Mariucci Arena • Minneapolis, MN	Killewald	W 3–1	1,005	23–6–1 (18–3–1)	
March 2	7:05	at Minnesota Duluth	Duluth Entertainment Convention Center • Duluth, MN	Killewald	T 2–2 ^{OT}	1,377	23–6–2 (18–3–2)	
March 3	7:05	at Minnesota Duluth	Duluth Entertainment Convention Center • Duluth, MN	Killewald	L 1–3	1,625	23–7–2 (18–4–2)	
WCHA Tournament
March 9	7:44	vs. Ohio State*	Rochester Recreation Center • Rochester, MN (WCHA Final Faceoff, Semifinal Game)	Killewald	L 0–4	401	23–8–2 (18–4–2)	
March 10	4:00	vs. Wisconsin*	Rochester Recreation Center • Rochester, MN (WCHA Final Faceoff, Consolation Game)	Killewald	L 3–4	423	23–9–2 (18–4–2)	
*Non-conference game. ^{#}Rankings from USCHO.com Poll.

== Roster ==
No.	Nat.	Player	Class	Pos	Height	DoB	Hometown	Previous team
2		Courtney Kennedy	Senior	D	5' 9" (1.75 m)	1979-03-29	Woburn, Massachusetts	Buckingham Browne & Nichols School
3		Jerilyn Glenn	Freshman	F	5' 9" (1.75 m)		Ham Lake, Minnesota	Forest Lake Area High School
4		Nadine Muzerall	Senior	F	5' 7" (1.7 m)	1978-10-19	Mississauga, Ontario	Kimball Union Academy
6		Angela Borek	Senior	D	5' 10" (1.78 m)	1978-06-02	Burnsville, Minnesota	Burnsville High School
8		Kelly Olson	Senior	D	5' 8" (1.73 m)	1979-03-06	Little Canada, Minnesota	Roseville Area High School
9		Megan Milbert	Senior	F	5' 5" (1.65 m)	1979-04-24	South St. Paul, Minnesota	South St. Paul Secondary
10		Kris Scholz	Senior	F	5' 8" (1.73 m)	1977-10-19	Hugo, Minnesota	Stillwater Area High School
14		La Toya Clarke	Freshman	F	5' 3" (1.6 m)		Pickering, Ontario	Dunbarton High School
15		Kelsey Bills	Freshman	F	5' 3" (1.6 m)		Carstairs, Alberta	Hugh Sutherland High School
16		Betsey Kukowski	Senior	F	5' 9" (1.75 m)	1979-02-23	Apple Valley, Minnesota	Shattuck-Saint Mary's
17		Cecilia Retelle	Freshman	D	5' 9" (1.75 m)		Madison, Wisconsin	Culver Academy
18		Emily Buchholz	Senior	D	5' 9" (1.75 m)	1978-09-27	Waupun, Wisconsin	Waupun High School
19		Melissa Coulombe	Freshman	D	5' 4" (1.63 m)		St-Pierre-Jolys, Manitoba	St. Pierre Collegiate
21		Laura Slominski	Junior	F	5' 3" (1.6 m)	1980-06-28	Burnsville, Minnesota	Burnsville High School
22		Gwen Anderson	Sophomore	F	5' 3" (1.6 m)	1980-09-08	North St. Paul, Minnesota	North St. Paul High School
23		Tracy Palinsky	Freshman	F	5' 5" (1.65 m)		Port Elgin, Ontario	Notre Dame Secondary
24		Tracy Engstrom	Junior	F	5' 6" (1.68 m)	1980-02-17	Willmar, Minnesota	Willmar High School
26		Alyson Sundberg	Sophomore	F	5' 7" (1.7 m)	1981-04-08	Roseville, Minnesota	Roseville Area High School
27		Ambria Thomas	Senior	F	5' 6" (1.68 m)	1978-10-30	Fairbanks, Alaska	West Valley High School
28		Stefanie Snow	Freshman	D	5' 4" (1.63 m)		Bedford, New Hampshire	Cushing Academy
29		Ronda Curtin	Sophomore	F	5' 10" (1.78 m)	1980-11-02	Roseville, Minnesota	Roseville Area High School
35		Stephanie Johnson	Freshman	G	5' 7" (1.7 m)		Brooklyn Center, Minnesota	Minneapolis South High School
36		Erica Killewald	Senior	G	5' 10" (1.78 m)	1979-11-20	Troy, Michigan	Troy High School
