= 2005–06 Mercyhurst Lakers women's ice hockey season =

American college ice hockey team season

== Regular season ==
- October 8: Against Minnesota State, Julia Colizza notched three assists.
- October 21: Against the Minnesota Golden Gophers women's ice hockey program, Laura Hosier had 33 saves.
- November 4: In a match against their CHA rival, the Niagara Purple Eagles women's ice hockey program, Julia Colizza had three assists.
- December 4: Julia Colizza scored a hat trick against the Yale Bulldogs women's ice hockey program
- December 10: Valerie Chouinard had three assists against Robert Morris, while Julia Colizza registered a hat trick against the Robert Morris Colonials women's ice hockey program.
- January 7: Versus the Connecticut Huskies women's ice hockey, Stephanie Bourbeau scored one goal and two assists
- January 8: Against the Providence Friars women's ice hockey, Stephanie Bourbeau notched two goals
- January 13: Danielle Lansing had two assists against CHA rival Wayne State
- January 21: Danielle Ayearst scored her only goal of the season against CHA rival the Niagara Purple Eagles. It proved to be the game-winning goal.
- January 28: Versus the Boston College Eagles, Danielle Lansing had a goal and an assist.
- October 8 to October 15: Samantha Shirley had a three-game goal scoring streak
- December 9 to January 14: Stephanie Bourbeau had a six-game goal scoring streak
- February 24: Valerie Chouinard had three assists versus the Cornell Big Red women's ice hockey team
- From November 26 to December 10, Ashley Pendleton scored four goals in five games.

=== Players ===
- Stefanie Bourbeau appeared in 35 games for the Lakers. Bourbeau accumulated 35 points (17 goals and 18 assists). Her 35 points ranked third, while her assists were fourth overall. Of her 17 goals, five were scored on the power play, two were game-winners, while one was shorthanded. Her plus minus of +26 was good enough for third overall.
- Valerie Chouinard led the Lakers in the three major offensive categories: goals (26), assists (25), points (51). In addition, her seven power play goals and six game-winning goals led the team.
- Julia Colizza ranked second on the team in all three major offensive categories: 20 goals, 22 assists and 42 points. Her four shorthanded goals led the Lakers. Her plus/minus ranking of +31 led the team. On the power play, she had 10 assists.
- Laura Hosier played in 28 games and established herself as the top goaltender. Her goals against average was 1.82 goals while her save percentage was.908.
- Stephanie Jones played in 35 games and her 22 assists tied for second on the team. Her 32 points were fourth on the Lakers. Of the 10 goals she notched, one goal was scored on the power play while two were game-winning goals.
- Ashley Pendleton appeared in 37 games and accumulated 26 points (10 goals and 16 assists). Of her 26 points, fourteen (five goals and nine assists) were scored on the power play. Her power play points ranked second on the team along with her plus/minus rating of +29.
- Samantha Shirley was named the Team captain and played in all 37 games. Her 11 goals ranked fourth while her 26 points ranked fifth on the Lakers. Of her 11 goals, three were game winners.

== Player stats ==
= Indicates team leader

=== Skaters ===
Player	Games Played	Goals	Assists	Points	Game Winning Goals
Valerie Chouinard	35	26	25	51	6
Julia Colizza	37	20	22	42	5
Stefanie Bourbeau	35	17	18	35	2
Stephanie Jones	35	10	22	32	2
Samantha Shirley	37	11	15	26	3
Ashley Pendleton	37	10	16	26	0
Danielle Lansing	35	2	11	13	0
Danielle Ayearst	37	1	12	13	1
Jill Nugent	37	5	7	12	1
Kristen Erickson	37	5	6	11	0
Sherilyn Fraser	37	3	8	11	0
Michelle Bonello	35	2	8	10	0
Robyn Law	37	4	4	8	0
Courtney Unruh	37	4	4	8	2
Natalie Payne	37	2	6	8	1
Lesley MacArthur	37	4	3	7	0
Sarah Kurth	29	1	1	2	0
Emily Berzins	37	0	2	2	0
Laura Hosier	28	0	1	1	0
Nicole Nelson	2	0	0	0	0
Courtney Drennen	12	0	0	0	0

== Awards and honors ==
- Danielle Ayearst, CHA All-Academic Team
- Stephanie Bourbeau, Second Team All-CHA
- Stephanie Bourbeau, All-Tournament Team
- Stephanie Bourbeau, CHA All-Academic Team
- Valerie Chouinard, CHA Rookie of the Year
- Valerie Chouinard, CHA Player of the Year
- Valerie Chouinard, First Team All-CHA
- Valerie Chouinard, CHA All-Rookie Team
- Valerie Chouinard, CHA Tournament MVP
- Valerie Chouinard, Easton Three-Star Player of the Year
- Valerie Chouinard, USCHO.com Rookie of the Year
- Valerie Chouinard, USCHO.com Second Team
- Valerie Chouinard, CHA All-Academic Team
- Julia Colizza, Second Team All-CHA
- Julia Colizza, CHA All-Tournament Team
- Julia Colizza CHA All-Academic Team
- Laura Hosier, CHA All-Academic Team
- Stephanie Jones, Bill Smith Award-Winner
- Stephanie Jones, CHA All-Academic Team
- Stephanie Jones, Frozen Four Skills Challenge Participant
- Danielle Lansing, First Team All-CHA
- Danielle Lansing, CHA All-Tournament Team
- Danielle Lansing, Frozen Four Skills Challenge Alternate
- Danielle Lansing, CHA All-Academic Team
- Danielle Lansing, USCHO.com Second Team
- Jill Nugent, CHA All-Academic Team
- Ashley Pendleton, First Team All-CHA

== Postseason ==
- Ashley Pendleton had a pair of assists in the CHA semifinal game versus the Robert Morris Colonials. Valerie Chouinard scored a hat trick in CHA semifinals against Robert Morris. In the CHA semifinals versus Robert Morris, Stephanie Bourbeau scored two goals and an assist, while Danielle Ayearst had three assists. Team Captain Samantha Shirley had one goal and one assist.
- Julia Colizza scored two goals in the CHA Championship game against Niagara, while Valerie Chouinard scored two goals. Stephanie Bourbeau accumulated four assists in the CHA Championship game. In the Championship Game, Stephanie Jones notched one goal and two assists. Colizza scored Mercyhurst's only goal (shorthanded) in their 2-1 loss to the Wisconsin Badgers in NCAA Regional.
