= American Women's College Hockey Alliance =

Defunct American ice hockey organization

The American Women's College Hockey Alliance (AWCHA) debuted in 1997–98. It was a program funded through the United States Olympic Committee/NCAA Conference Grant Program. The AWCHA organized and developed activities with collegiate women's varsity ice hockey teams, and helped to promote women's ice hockey at all NCAA levels. The first AWCHA Division I national ice hockey championship was held in March 1998. The New Hampshire Wildcats defeated the Brown Bears by a 4–1 score, to become the first recognized national champion in women's college ice hockey. There were two more AWCHA National Championships and then the NCAA became involved. In August 2000, the NCAA announced it would hold its first Division I women's ice hockey national championship. The Minnesota Duluth Bulldogs captured the first NCAA national championship, defeating the St. Lawrence Saints by a 4–2 tally on March 25, 2001.

== American Women's College Hockey Alliance champions ==
Prior to the NCAA establishing a women's ice hockey championship, the AWCHA held a championship from 1997–98 season to 1999–2000 season. Below are those champions.

Year	Champion	Coach	Score	Runner-up	Coach	City	Arena	Reference
1998	New Hampshire	Karen Kay	4–1	Brown	Digit Murphy	Boston, MA	FleetCenter	
1999	Harvard	Katey Stone	6–5	Brown	Digit Murphy	Minneapolis, MN	Mariucci Arena	
2000	Minnesota	Laura Halldorson	4–2	Brown	Digit Murphy	Boston, MA	Matthews Arena	
