= 1998–99 Harvard Crimson women's ice hockey season =

Beanpot Champions Ivy League title ECAC regular-season champions ECAC tournament championships AWCHA Tournament, National champions

Record

Coaches and captains
- Head coach: Katey Stone

The Harvard Crimson finished with a win–loss record of 33 wins and 1 loss. Of the 31 wins, the Crimson won 30 consecutive games to close the season. The final game of that 30 game streak was a 6-5 overtime victory over the New Hampshire Wildcats women's ice hockey program in the AWCHA national championship game. During the season, the Crimson would win the Beanpot and Ivy League title. In addition, the Crimson won their first ECAC regular-season and tournament championships.

== Awards and honors ==
- A.J. Mleczko, Patty Kazmaier Award
- Tammy Lee Shewchuk, 1999 ECAC All-Tournament team
- Katey Stone, ECAC/KOHO Coach of the Year honors
- Katey Stone, New England Hockey Writers’ Coach of the Year honors
- Katey Stone, American Hockey Coaches Association Women’s Coach of the Year
- Katey Stone, New England College Athletic Conference Women’s Division I Coach of the Year.
