= Collège Mathieu =

College in Saskatchewan, Canada

Collège Mathieu de Gravelbourg
- Established: 1917
- Location: Gravelbourg, Saskatchewan, Canada; 49.8725°N 106.5495°W
- Website: www.collegemathieu.sk.ca

Collège Mathieu is a small French-language college based in Gravelbourg, Saskatchewan, Canada, that provides post-secondary education.

== History ==
The college was founded by Olivier Elzéar Mathieu, Archbishop of Regina, on December 15, 1917, with the first classes being offered in 1918.

== See also ==
- List of historic places in Saskatchewan
