= Kelly Stephens-Tysland =

American ice hockey player (born 1983)

- Born: June 4, 1983 (age 43) Seattle, WA, USA
- Height: 5 ft 6 in (168 cm)
- Weight: 130 lb (59 kg; 9 st 4 lb)
- Position: Forward
- WCHA team: Minnesota Golden Gophers
- National team: United States
- Playing career: 2004–2006
Medal record
Representing United States
Women's ice hockey
Olympic Games
Bronze medal – third place	2006 Turin	Tournament
IIHF World Women's Championships
Gold medal – first place	2005 Sweden	Tournament
Silver medal – second place	2004 Canada	Tournament

Kelly Pierce Stephens-Tysland (born June 4, 1983) is an American ice hockey player. She won a bronze medal at the 2006 Winter Olympics. She participated in women's ice hockey at the University of Minnesota before moving back to her home city of Seattle and starting Experience Momentum with her physical therapist husband, an integrative wellness clinic that specializes in physical therapy, fitness classes, nutrition, and massage with three locations in Fremont, Lynnwood, and Mill Creek, Washington.
