= Blaine High School (Minnesota) =

Public secondary school in Blaine, Minnesota, United States

Location
- 12555 University Avenue Northeast; Blaine, Minnesota 55434; United States; 45°11′57″N 93°15′48″W

Information
- Type: Public high school
- Established: 1972
- School district: Anoka-Hennepin School District 11
- Teaching staff: 154.86 (on an FTE basis)
- Grades: 9-12
- Enrollment: 3,157 (2024–2025)
- Student to teacher ratio: 20.39
- Colors: Navy Blue, Columbia Blue and White
- Nickname: Bengals
- Website: bhs.ahschools.us

Blaine High School is a public high school in Blaine, Minnesota. It is in Anoka-Hennepin School District 11. The school opened in 1972 as part of the Blaine Project.

== Demographics ==
As of the 2021–22 school year, the school had an enrollment of 2,981 students and 150.37 classroom teachers (on an FTE basis), for a student–teacher ratio of 19.82:1. 546 students (18.3%) were eligible for free lunch and 189 (6.3%) for reduced-cost lunch.

== Academics ==
Blaine High School participates in the University of Minnesota's College in the Schools program.

== Athletics ==
Blaine High School won the Minnesota high school boys hockey class AA championship in 2000, led by future NHL players Matt Hendricks and Brandon Bochenski. The school has produced three Mr. Hockey Award winners: Current NHL players Nick Bjugstad in 2010 and Riley Tufte in 2016, as well as Bryce Brodzinski, who won the award in 2019 and was selected 196th overall in the 2019 NHL entry draft by the Philadelphia Flyers. The football team has appeared in the state tournament 14 times, most notably in 2008 where the team defeated heavily favored Eden Prairie, which was ranked third nationally among all high schools, en route to an appearance in the state championship game. Blaine has only won one state football championship however, which came in 1988. The Girls Nordic Skiing Team won the 1979 state championship.

The nickname for the school's athletic teams is the Bengals; colors are Navy Blue, Columbia Blue and White.

== Notable alumni ==
- Nick Bjugstad, 2010 Mr. Hockey winner; professional ice hockey player for the Utah Mammoth.
- Brandon Bochenski. former professional ice hockey player in the NHL and KHL
- Jonny Brodzinski, professional ice hockey player for the New York Rangers
- Trevor Frischmon, former professional ice hockey player in the NHL
- Matt Hendricks, former professional ice hockey player for 15 years in the NHL
- Melissa Hortman, member and speaker of the Minnesota House of Representatives
- Dan Johnson, former MLB first baseman
- Patrick O'Bryant, professional basketball player; selected ninth overall in 2006 NBA draft by the Golden State Warriors.
- Jeff Romfo, retired ice hockey right winger
- Riley Tufte, 2016 Mr. Hockey winner; professional ice hockey player for the Dallas Stars.
- Isabelle Stadden, swimmer
