= 2009–10 Clarkson Golden Knights women's ice hockey season =

NCAA Quarterfinals, L 2–3 ^{OT} vs. Minnesota
- Conference: 2nd ECAC
- Home ice: Cheel Arena

Rankings
- USCHO.com: #5
- USA Today/USA Hockey Magazine: #5

Record
- Overall: 23–12–5
- Home: 16–3–2
- Road: 7–9–3

Coaches and captains
- Head coach: Shannon Desrosiers and Matt Desrosiers
- Assistant coaches: Matt Kelly
- Captain: Britney Selina
- Alternate captain: Carlee Eusepi

The Clarkson Golden Knights women's ice hockey program represented Clarkson University during the 2009–10 NCAA women's ice hockey season. The Golden Knights secured their sixth consecutive appearance in the ECAC playoffs, and qualified for their first NCAA tournament.

== Class of 2010 ==
Britney Selina, Carlee Eusepi, Genevieve Lavoie, Ashleigh Moorehead, Tegan Schroeder, and Dominique Thibault were the senior class of 2010. During their four years with Clarkson, the club accumulated 81 victories. This was highlighted by two 20+ win campaigns (2007–08 and 2009–10). In addition, there were four appearances in the ECAC Hockey playoffs and two championship tournament showings in 2008 and 2010. The final year was highlighted by the Golden Knights first ever appearance in the NCAA Tournament this season.

== Schedule ==
Date	Opponent^{#}	Rank^{#}	Site	Decision	Result	Record
Regular Season
September 26	Ottawa PWHL*		Cheel Arena • Potsdam, NY (exhibition)	Lauren Dahm	W 7–3	0–0–0
October 2	Boston College*		Cheel Arena • Potsdam, NY	Lauren Dahm	W 5–1	1–0–0
October 3	Boston College*		Cheel Arena • Potsdam, NY	Lauren Dahm	T 1–1 ^{OT}	1–0–1
October 9	Providence*	#7	Cheel Arena • Potsdam, NY	Lauren Dahm	W 3–2 ^{OT}	2–0–1
October 10	Connecticut*	#7	Cheel Arena • Potsdam, NY	Lauren Dahm	W 4–0	3–0–1
October 16	at Vermont*	#4	Gutterson Fieldhouse • Burlington, VT	Lauren Dahm	W 4–0	4–0–1
October 17	at Vermont*	#4	Gutterson Fieldhouse • Burlington, VT	Lauren Dahm	L 1–4	4–1–1
October 23	#3 New Hampshire*	#4	Cheel Arena • Potsdam, NY	Lauren Dahm	W 6–2	5–1–1
October 24	#9 Boston University*	#4	Cheel Arena • Potsdam, NY	Lauren Dahm	W 7–2	6–1–1
October 27	#7 St. Lawrence	#3	Cheel Arena • Potsdam, NY	Lauren Dahm	W 4–1	7–1–1 (1–0–0)
October 30	Brown	#3	Cheel Arena • Potsdam, NY	Lauren Dahm	W 1–0	8–1–1 (2–0–0)
October 31	Yale	#3	Cheel Arena • Potsdam, NY	Lauren Dahm	W 2–0	9–1–1 (3–0–0)
November 6	at Harvard	#2	Bright-Landry Hockey Center • Allston, MA	Lauren Dahm	W 2–1	10–1–1 (4–0–0)
November 7	at Dartmouth	#2	Thompson Arena • Hanover, NH	Lauren Dahm	W 3–1	11–1–1 (5–0–0)
November 13	at #7 Cornell	#2	Lynah Rink • Ithaca, NY	Lauren Dahm	L 0–2	11–2–1 (5–1–0)
November 14	at Colgate	#2	Starr Arena • Hamilton, NY	Lauren Dahm	W 4–1	12–2–1 (6–1–0)
November 27	at #2 Minnesota*	#3	Ridder Arena • Minneapolis, MN	Lauren Dahm	L 0–4	12–3–1
November 28	at #2 Minnesota*	#3	Ridder Arena • Minneapolis, MN	Lauren Dahm	L 0–2	12–4–1
December 4	Quinnipiac	#4	Cheel Arena • Potsdam, NY	Lauren Dahm	W 2–1	13–4–1 (7–1–0)
December 5	Princeton	#4	Cheel Arena • Potsdam, NY	Lauren Dahm	W 3–0	14–4–1 (8–1–0)
January 8	at Union	#3	Achilles Rink • Schenectady, NY	Lauren Dahm	W 3–1	15–4–1 (9–1–0)
January	at RPI	#3	Houston Field House • Troy, NY	Lauren Dahm	T 3–3 ^{OT}	15–4–2 (9–1–1)
January 15	at #1 Mercyhurst*	#4	Mercyhurst Ice Center • Erie, PA	Lauren Dahm	L 3–6	15–5–2
January 16	at #1 Mercyhurst*	#4	Mercyhurst Ice Center • Erie, PA	Lauren Dahm	T 5–5 ^{OT}	15–5–3
January 22	at Yale	#3	Ingalls Rink • New Haven, CT	Lauren Dahm	W 3–2 ^{OT}	16–5–3 (10–1–1)
January 23	at Brown	#3	Meehan Auditorium • Providence, RI	Lauren Dahm	W 3–0	17–5–3 (11–1–1)
January 29	Colgate	#3	Cheel Arena • Potsdam, NY	Lauren Dahm	W 3–0	18–5–3 (12–1–1)
January 30	Cornell	#3	Cheel Arena • Potsdam, NY	Lauren Dahm	W 2–1	19–5–3 (13–1–1)
February 2	at St. Lawrence	#3	Appleton Arena • Canton, NY	Kelsey Neumann	L 2–4	19–6–3 (13–2–1)
February 5	RPI	#3	Cheel Arena • Potsdam, NY	Lauren Dahm	L 1–3	19–7–3 (13–3–1)
February 6	Union	#3	Cheel Arena • Potsdam, NY	Lauren Dahm	W 3–0	20–7–3 (14–3–1)
February 12	at Princeton	#4	Hobey Baker Memorial Rink • Princeton, NJ	Lauren Dahm	L 0–1 ^{OT}	20–8–3 (14–4–1)
February 13	at Quinnipiac	#4	TD Bank Sports Center • Hamden, CT	Lauren Dahm	T 1–1 ^{OT}	20–8–4 (14–4–2)
February 19	Dartmouth	#6	Cheel Arena • Potsdam, NY	Lauren Dahm	L 1–4	20–9–4 (14–5–2)
February 20	#5 Harvard	#6	Cheel Arena • Potsdam, NY	Lauren Dahm	T 3–3 ^{OT}	20–9–5 (14–5–3)
ECAC Hockey Tournament
February 26	St. Lawrence*	#6	Cheel Arena • Potsdam, NY (Quarterfinals Game 1)	Lauren Dahm	W 5–0	21–9–5
February 27	St. Lawrence*	#6	Cheel Arena • Potsdam, NY (Quarterfinals Game 2)	Lauren Dahm	L 1–2	21–10–5
February 28	St. Lawrence*	#6	Cheel Arena • Potsdam, NY (Quarterfinals Game 3)	Lauren Dahm	W 4–1	22–10–5
March 5	#4 Harvard*	#6	Cheel Arena • Potsdam, NY (Semifinals)	Lauren Dahm	W 3–2	23–10–5
March 7	at #8 Cornell*	#6	Lynah Rink • Ithaca, NY (Championship)	Lauren Dahm	L 3–4 ^{OT}	23–11–5
NCAA Tournament
March 13	at #3 Minnesota*	#5	Ridder Arena • Minneapolis, MN (Quarterfinals)	Lauren Dahm	L 2–3 ^{OT}	23–12–5
*Non-conference game. ^{#}Rankings from USCHO.com Poll.

== Roster ==
Number	Name	Position	Height	Class
4	Katelyn Ptolemy	Defense	5-5	So.
7	Gabrielle Kosziwka	Forward	5-9	So.
9	Hailey Wood	Defense	5-5	Fr.
10	Danielle Boudreau	Forward	5-6	So.
11	Tegan Schroeder	Defense	5-5	Sr.
14	Brittany Mulligan	Forward	5-11	So.
15	Carlee Eusepi	Defense	5-10	Sr.
16	Daris Tendler	Forward	5-4	Jr.
17	Caitlin Oleksa	Center	5-2	Jr.
18	Courtney Olson	Defense	5-5	Jr.
19	Kali Gillanders	Forward	5-11	So.
21	Genevieve Lavoie	Forward	5-11	Sr.
22	Meg Omand	Forward	5-8	So.
23	Melissa Waldie	Forward	5-6	Jr.
25	Juana Baribeau	Forward	5-7	So.
26	Ashleigh Moorehead	Forward	5-9	Sr.
27	Britney Selina	Center	5-6	Sr.
28	Danielle Skirrow	Forward	5-3	Fr.
31	Kelsey Neumann	Goaltender	5-4	Fr.
35	Lauren Dahm	Goaltender	5-6	Jr.
96	Dominique Thibault	Forward	5-11	Sr.

== Player stats ==
=== Skaters ===
Player	Games	Goals	Assists	Points	Points/game	PIM	GWG	PPG	SHG
Dominique Thibault	39	21	19	40	1.0256	28	5	5	1
Juana Baribeau	40	18	19	37	0.9250	50	3	3	1
Britney Selina	40	10	26	36	0.9000	18	1	4	1
Melissa Waldie	38	18	12	30	0.7895	10	5	10	0
Carlee Eusepi	39	6	13	19	0.4872	12	3	4	0
Kali Gillanders	37	3	10	13	0.3514	38	3	0	0
Genevieve Lavoie	40	3	9	12	0.3000	6	0	0	0
Daris Tendler	40	6	5	11	0.2750	6	0	0	0
Gabrielle Kosziwka	40	7	2	9	0.2250	16	1	0	0
Brittany Mulligan	35	5	3	8	0.2286	48	1	0	0
Hailey Wood	40	1	6	7	0.1750	18	0	0	0
Danielle Skirrow	39	1	6	7	0.1795	20	0	0	0
Tegan Schroeder	40	2	4	6	0.1500	38	1	0	0
Danielle Boudreau	40	2	4	6	0.1500	12	0	1	0
Courtney Olson	40	1	3	4	0.1000	28	0	0	0
Katelyn Ptolemy	40	0	4	4	0.1000	12	0	0	0
Ashleigh Moorehead	39	0	1	1	0.0256	2	0	0	0
Lauren Dahm	39	0	0	0	0.0000	0	0	0	0
Meg Omand	10	0	0	0	0.0000	0	0	0	0
Kelsey Neumann	1	0	0	0	0.0000	0	0	0	0
Caitlin Oleksa	34	0	0	0	0.0000 2	0	0	0	0

== Awards and honors ==
- Juana Baribeau – ECAC Hockey Player of the Week (10/12)
- Lauren Dahm – 2009–10 ECAC Hockey Second Team All-Star, ECAC Hockey Goaltender of the Week (10/5, 10/12, 10/26), ECAC Hockey weekly Honor Roll (11/2, 11/9, 12/7), Patty Kazmaier Memorial Award nominee
- Carlee Eusepi – 2009–10 ECAC Hockey Best Defensive Defenseman, 2009–10 ECAC Hockey Second Team All-Star, All-Star ECAC Hockey representative vs Team USA, ECAC Hockey Player of the Week (11/9, 3/1)
- Kali Gillanders – ECAC Hockey Player of the Week (11/2)
- Katelyn Ptolemy – ECAC Hockey Student-Athlete of the Year nominee
- Britney Selina – 2009–10 ECAC Hockey Best Defensive Forward, 2009–10 ECAC Hockey Second Team All-Star, All-Star ECAC Hockey representative vs Team USA, ECAC Hockey Player of the Week (10/26), Patty Kazmaier Memorial Award nominee
- Dominque Thibault – 2009–10 ECAC Hockey Third Team All-Star, All-Star ECAC Hockey representative vs Team USA, ECAC Hockey Player of the Week (1/25), ECAC Hockey weekly Honor Roll (12/7), Patty Kazmaier Memorial Award nominee
- Melissa Waldie – ECAC Hockey Player of the Week (10/5, 10/19)
- Hailey Wood – ECAC Hockey weekly Honor Roll (10/5, 10/12)

== See also ==
- 2009–10 ECAC Hockey women's ice hockey season
