= 2003–04 Minnesota Golden Gophers women's ice hockey season =

WCHA Final Faceoff champions Frozen Four, Champions
- Conference: 1 WCHA
- Home ice: Ridder Arena

Rankings
- USA Today/USA Hockey Magazine: 1
- USCHO.com/CBS College Sports: 1

Record
- Overall: 30–4–2
- Conference: 19–3–2
- Home: 17–3–0
- Road: 11–1–2
- Neutral: 2–0–0

Coaches and captains
- Head coach: Laura Halldorson
- Assistant coaches: Joel Johnson; Brad Frost
- Captain(s): Kelsey Bills; La Toya Clarke

The Golden Gophers accumulated an overall record of 30–4–2, and a 19–3–2 WCHA record in the 2003–04 campaign. The Golden Gophers swept the WCHA honors, winning the regular season championship and the WCHA Final Five with a 4–2 win over in-state rivals Minnesota Duluth.

== Regular season ==
=== Standings ===
2003–04 Western Collegiate Hockey Association standings
	Conference								Overall					
	GP	W	L	T	SOW	PTS	GF	GA	GP	W	L	T	GF	GA
Minnesota†*	24	19	3	2	–	40	95	40	36	30	4	2	161	60
Wisconsin	24	18	5	1	–	37	81	34	34	25	6	3	122	50
Minnesota Duluth	24	15	8	1	–	31	110	52	34	20	12	2	148	79
Minnesota State	24	9	11	4	–	22	45	62	34	16	14	4	75	81
Ohio State	24	10	12	2	–	22	51	69	35	16	16	3	83	90
St. Cloud State	24	4	19	1	–	9	53	107	32	7	24	1	74	137
Bemidji State	24	3	20	1	–	7	29	100	34	5	27	2	48	139
Championship: † indicates conference regular season champion; * indicates conference tournament champion Updated July 21, 2024

The Gophers went undefeated in the first half of the season, posting a 13–0–1 record. The Golden Gophers were the top team in the country for 18 of the 23 weeks in both the U.S. College Hockey Online and USA Today polls.

=== Schedule ===
As of September 13, 2024.

Date	Time	Opponent^{#}	Rank^{#}	Site	Decision	Result	Attendance	Record
Regular Season
October 17	7:05	Ohio State		Ridder Arena • Minneapolis, MN	Horak	W 6–3	1,059	1–0–0 (1–0–0)
October 18	7:05	Ohio State		Ridder Arena • Minneapolis, MN	Horak	W 7–0	1,258	2–0–0 (2–0–0)
October 25	2:05	at #6 Wisconsin	#1	Kohl Center • Madison, WI	Horak	W 3–0	1,124	3–0–0 (3–0–0)
October 26	2:05	at #6 Wisconsin	#1	Kohl Center • Madison, WI	Horak	W 3–1	1,022	4–0–0 (4–0–0)
October 31	4:05	St. Cloud State		Ridder Arena • Minneapolis, MN	Horak	W 4–1	554	5–0–0 (5–0–0)
November 1	2:05	St. Cloud State		Ridder Arena • Minneapolis, MN	Horak	W 5–3	1,058	6–0–0 (6–0–0)
November 15	2:00	at Brown*		Meehan Auditorium • Providence, RI	Horak	W 5–2	187	7–0–0 (6–0–0)
November 16	12:00	at Brown*		Meehan Auditorium • Providence, RI	Horak	W 8–1	105	8–0–0 (6–0–0)
November 22	4:05	at Minnesota State		Midwest Wireless Civic Center • Mankato, MN	Horak	T 1–1	234	8–0–1 (6–0–1)
November 23	4:05	at Minnesota State		Midwest Wireless Civic Center • Mankato, MN	Reinen	W 4–0	307	9–0–1 (7–0–1)
November 29	2:05	North Dakota*		Ridder Arena • Minneapolis, MN	Horak	W 6–2	1,236	10–0–1 (7–0–1)
November 30	2:05	North Dakota*		Ridder Arena • Minneapolis, MN	Reinen	W 10–1	1,063	11–0–1 (7–0–1)
December 5	7:05	Bemidji State		Ridder Arena • Minneapolis, MN	Horak	W 7–0	894	12–0–1 (8–0–1)
December 6	4:05	Bemidji State		Ridder Arena • Minneapolis, MN	Horak	W 6–1	876	13–0–1 (9–0–1)
January 9	7:05	at Minnesota Duluth		Duluth Entertainment Convention Center • Duluth, MN	Horak	L 1–4	1,489	13–1–1 (9–1–1)
January 10	7:05	at Minnesota Duluth		Duluth Entertainment Convention Center • Duluth, MN	Horak	W 4–3 ^{OT}	1,587	14–1–1 (10–1–1)
January 16	7:05	Mercyhurst*		Ridder Arena • Minneapolis, MN	Horak	W 5–1	985	15–1–1 (10–1–1)
January 17	7:05	Mercyhurst*		Ridder Arena • Minneapolis, MN	Horak	W 3–1	1,143	16–1–1 (10–1–1)
January 24	1:05	Minnesota State		Ridder Arena • Minneapolis, MN	Horak	W 3–2	1,050	17–1–1 (11–1–1)
January 25	1:05	Minnesota State		Ridder Arena • Minneapolis, MN	Horak	L 2–3 ^{OT}	1,540	17–2–1 (11–2–1)
January 31	2:05	at Bemidji State		John S. Glas Field House • Bemidji, MN	Horak	W 4–1	130	18–2–1 (12–2–1)
February 1	2:05	at Bemidji State		John S. Glas Field House • Bemidji, MN	Reinen	W 4–0	296	19–2–1 (13–2–1)
February 7	1:05	#1 Dartmouth*	#2	Ridder Arena • Minneapolis, MN	Horak	L 2–3	1,115	19–3–1 (13–2–1)
February 8	1:05	#1 Dartmouse*	#2	Ridder Arena • Minneapolis, MN	Horak	W 7–3	2,214	20–3–1 (13–2–1)
February 13	7:05	Wisconsin		Ridder Arena • Minneapolis, MN	Horak	L 1–2 ^{OT}	1,029	20–4–1 (13–3–1)
February 14	7:05	Wisconsin		Ridder Arena • Minneapolis, MN	Reinen	W 2–1	1,869	21–4–1 (14–3–1)
February 20	7:05	at Ohio State	#1	Ohio State University Ice Rink • Columbus, OH	Horak	T 1–1	416	21–4–2 (14–3–2)
February 21	7:05	at Ohio State	#1	Ohio State University Ice Rink • Columbus, OH	Reinen	W 6–0	431	22–4–2 (15–3–2)
February 28	2:05	#6 Minnesota Duluth	#2	Ridder Arena • Minneapolis, MN	Horak	W 4–2	3,142	23–4–2 (16–3–2)
February 29	2:05	#6 Minnesota Duluth	#2	Ridder Arena • Minneapolis, MN	Reinen	W 7–5	2,359	24–4–2 (17–3–2)
March 5	4:05	at St. Cloud State	#1	Herb Brooks National Hockey Center • St. Cloud, MN	Horak	W 3–1	540	25–4–2 (18–3–2)
March 6	7:05	at St. Cloud State	#1	Herb Brooks National Hockey Center • St. Cloud, MN	Reinen	W 7–5	1,078	26–4–2 (19–3–2)
WCHA Tournament
March 13	4:05	Ohio State*		Ridder Arena • Minneapolis, MN (WCHA Final Faceoff, Semifinal Game)	Horak	W 5–1	1,262	27–4–2 (19–3–2)
March 14	4:10	Minnesota Duluth*		Ridder Arena • Minneapolis, MN (WCHA Final Faceoff, Championship Game)	Horak	W 4–2	1,500	28–4–2 (19–3–2)
NCAA Tournament
March 26	5:05	vs. Dartmouth*		Dunkin' Donuts Center • Providence, RI (NCAA Frozen Four)	Horak	W 5–1	–	29–4–2 (19–3–2)
March 28	4:05	vs. #2 Harvard*	#1	Dunkin' Donuts Center • Providence, RI (NCAA Championship Game)	Horak	W 6–2	3,522	30–4–2 (19–3–2)
*Non-conference game. ^{#}Rankings from USCHO.com Poll.

=== Roster ===
No.	Nat.	Player	Class	Pos	Height	DoB	Hometown	Previous team
1		Brenda Reinen	Junior	G	5' 6" (1.68 m)		Sun Prairie, Wisconsin	Sun Prairie High School
3		Jerilyn Glenn	Senior	F	5' 9" (1.75 m)		Ham Lake, Minnesota	Forest Lake Area High School
4		Andrea Nichols	Freshman	F	5' 2" (1.57 m)		Mountain Iron, Minnesota	Hibbing High School
5		Chelsey Brodt	Sophomore	D	5' 4" (1.63 m)	1983-12-07	Roseville, Minnesota	Roseville Area High School
7		Krissy Wendell	Sophomore	F	5' 6" (1.68 m)	1981-09-12	Brooklyn Park, Minnesota	Park Center Senior High School
8		Noelle Sutton	Junior	F	5' 8" (1.73 m)		Maple Grove, Minnesota	Maple Grove High School
10		Krista Johnson	Sophomore	D	5' 8" (1.73 m)		Blaine, Minnesota	Blaine High School
11		Ashley Albrecht	Sophomore	D	5' 4" (1.63 m)		South Saint Paul, Minnesota	South Saint Paul Secondary
12		Stacy Troumbly	Junior	F/D	5' 2" (1.57 m)		Bovey, Minnesota	Hibbing High School
13		Maggie Souba	Freshman	F/D	5' 5" (1.65 m)		Moorhead, Minnesota	Moorhead High School
14		La Toya Clarke	Senior	F	5' 4" (1.63 m)	1981-06-11	Pickering, Ontario	Dunbarton High School
15		Kelsey Bills	Senior	F/D	5' 3" (1.6 m)		Carstairs, Alberta	Hugh Sutherland
17		Becky Wacker	Freshman	F	5' 4" (1.63 m)		York, Maine	York High School
18		Kelly Stephens	Junior	F	5' 6" (1.68 m)	1983-06-04	Shoreline, Washington	Shorewood High School
19		Melissa Coulombe	Senior	F/D	5' 4" (1.63 m)		St. Pierre-Jolys, Manitoba	St. Pierre Collegiate
20		Natalie Darwitz	Junior	F	5' 3" (1.6 m)	1983-10-13	Eagan, Minnesota	Eagan High School
21		Allie Sanchez	Sophomore	D	5' 6" (1.68 m)		Saint Paul, Minnesota	Johnson High School
25		Lyndsay Wall	Freshman	D	5' 8" (1.73 m)	1985-05-12	Churchville, New York	Churchville-Chili High School
27		Jody Horak	Junior	G	5' 7" (1.7 m)		Blaine, Minnesota	Blaine High School

== Postseason ==
On March 28, 2004, Halldorson and the Golden Gophers defeated Harvard, 6–2, to win their first NCAA Championship and her third national championship in six years.

== Awards and honors ==
- Laura Halldorson, American Hockey Coaches Association’s Coach of the Year, her third honor since 1998.
