= Brown Bears ice hockey =

Brown Bears ice hockey may refer to either of the ice hockey teams that represent Brown University:

- Brown Bears men's ice hockey
- Brown Bears women's ice hockey
