= 2009–10 Northeastern Huskies women's ice hockey season =

- Conference: 4th ECAC
- Home ice: Matthews Arena

Rankings
- USA Today/USA Hockey Magazine: Not ranked
- USCHO.com/CBS College Sports: 10

Record
- Overall: 3–1–1
- Home: 2–1–1
- Road: 1–0–1

Coaches and captains
- Head coach: Linda Lundrigan and Lauren McAuliffe
- Captain(s): Annie Hogan, Julia Marty, Katy Applin

The 2009–10 Northeastern Huskies women's hockey team represented Northeastern University in the 2009–10 NCAA Division I women's hockey season. The Huskies were a member of the Eastern College Athletic Conference and attempted to win the NCAA Women's Ice Hockey Championship. Dave Flint, who was named Northeastern's head women's hockey coach on June 23, 2008, was an assistant coach for the U.S. national team at the 2010 Olympics. Serving as interim co-head coaches for the 2009–10 season were current assistant coaches Linda Lundrigan and Lauren McAuliffe.

== Offseason ==
- April 21: The women's hockey team named its three captains at a banquet at Matthews Arena. Katy Applin, Annie Hogan, and Julia Marty will serve as tri-captains for the 2009–10 season.
- May 21: Dave Flint was named an assistant coach for the 2010 U.S. Olympic Women's Ice Hockey Team.
- Aug 3: The Huskies have added Danielle Kerr from London, Ontario to their 2009–10 recruiting class.

Kerr joins Lindsay Domaas, Brittany Esposito, Siena Falino, Casie Fields, Rachel Llanes, Casey Pickett and Kelly Wallace as the eight newcomers to the Huskies this season.

- Aug 21: The Northeastern University women's hockey team will face New Hampshire at Fenway Park on Jan. 8, 2010, in the first outdoor women's college hockey game ever. The 4 p.m. game played between the Huskies and Wildcats will be the first game of a Hockey East Doubleheader. The men's teams at Boston College and Boston University will face off at 7:30 p.m. This will be the 110th all-time matchup between the Huskies and the Wildcats.

== Exhibition ==
Date	Team	Location	Time	Score
Sat. Sept. 26	DAWSON	Matthews Arena	2:00 p.m.	McGill, 3–1
Sun. Sept. 27	MCGILL	Matthews Arena	2:00 p.m.	

== Regular season ==
- October: Florence Schelling posted a 6–1–1 record in October, including three shutouts vs. Robert Morris on Oct. 10 and Vermont on Oct. 30–31. Her 0.74 GAA and .970 save percentage led the nation, while her three shutouts were second nationally. She did not allow more than two goals in any game in October 2009, and has allowed one goal or less in seven of eight games. Her 191 saves rank second in the conference to Providence's Genevieve Lacasse. She is unbeaten in Hockey East play (3–0–1), giving up only three goals in four games.
- November: Florence Schelling posted a 3–2–1 record in November, recording one shutout (vs. Vermont on Nov. 25) and a 1.32 GAA and a .958 save percentage. In 362:48 minutes, Schelling stopped 183 of 191 shots. She allowed one goal or less in four of six games and made 30 saves or more in four of six games. On Nov. 8 at Providence, Schelling stopped 11 of 13 shootout attempts, in addition to making 37 saves in regulation and overtime.
- Leah Sulyma stopped 61 of 67 shots in two games the week of January 31, in addition to both shootout attempts in the opening round of the Beanpot on Feb. 2. Sulyma has now taken home the honor three times this season. Sulyma turned aside 31 shots on Feb. 2 vs. Boston University, helping Northeastern to its first Beanpot final in six years.
- February 10, 2010: Yale women's hockey head coach Hilary Witt was inducted into the Women's Beanpot Hall of Fame. The induction honors her performance as a player for Northeastern in the annual tournament featuring the four Boston-area women's hockey teams. The ceremony was held prior to the Beanpot Championship game at Harvard's Bright Center. Witt is Northeastern's all-time leading scorer and helped the Huskies to a pair of Beanpot championships (1997 and 1998) along with the 1997 ECAC championship. She had 20 career points in Beanpot competition, also a Northeastern record. Overall she totaled 113 goals, 95 assists and 208 points for her career (1997–2000).

=== Outdoor game ===
- January 8: The Huskies fell to New Hampshire by a score of 5–3 in the opening game of the Sun Life Frozen Fenway doubleheader, the first-ever outdoor women's college hockey game. The Huskies held a 3–1 lead into the third period, but a four-goal rally by the Wildcats earned them the win. Freshman Brittany Esposito scored two goals and senior Annie Hogan added two assists.

=== Standings ===
2009–10 Hockey East Association standings
	Conference								Overall					
	GP	W	L	T	SOW	PTS	GF	GA	GP	W	L	T	GF	GA
Providence	21	11	5	5	3	30	59	44	34	15	10	9	91	76
New Hampshire	21	13	6	2	0	28	65	41	31	19	7	5	98	60
Boston University	21	10	6	5	3	28	54	41	34	14	8	12	93	80
Northeastern	21	9	6	6	4	28	45	34	32	17	8	7	77	47
Connecticut	21	10	5	6	1	27	46	33	34	19	8	7	87	57
Boston College	21	7	10	4	4	22	41	54	34	8	16	10	63	97
Vermont	21	5	15	1	0	11	26	55	33	10	22	1	52	90
Maine	21	3	15	3	1	10	24	58	31	6	20	5	63	85

=== Schedule ===
Date	Team	Location	Time	Score	Record
Sat. Oct. 3	UNION	Matthews Arena	2:00 p.m.	2–1	1–0–0
Sun. Oct. 4	CONNECTICUT *	Matthews Arena	2:00 p.m.	1–1 (SO Win)	1–0–1
Sat. Oct. 10	ROBERT MORRIS	Matthews Arena	2:00 p.m.	4–0	2–0–1
Tue. Oct. 13	BOSTON COLLEGE *	Matthews Arena	7:00 p.m.	3–2	3–0–1
Sat. Oct. 17	QUINNIPIAC	Matthews Arena	3:00 p.m.	0–1	3–1–1
Fri. Oct. 23	BEMIDJI STATE	Matthews Arena	7:00 p.m.	2–1	4–1–1
Sat. Oct. 24	BEMIDJI STATE	Matthews Arena	3:00 p.m.	3–2	5–1–1
Fri. Oct. 30	at Vermont *	Burlington, Vt.	7:00 p.m.	3–0	6–1–1
Sat. Oct. 31	at Vermont *	Burlington, Vt.	4:00 p.m.	1–0	7–1–1
Sun. Nov. 8	at Providence *	Providence, R.I.	2:00 p.m.	1–1	7–1–2
Sat. Nov. 14	MAINE *	Matthews Arena	2:00 p.m.	5–1	8–1–2
Sun. Nov. 15	MAINE *	Matthews Arena	2:00 p.m.	0–1	8–2–2
Fri. Nov. 20	at Providence *	Providence, R.I.	7:00 p.m.	4–3	9–2–2
Wed. Nov. 25	VERMONT *	Matthews Arena	3:00 p.m.	1–0	10–2–2
Sun. Nov. 29	NEW HAMPSHIRE *	Matthews Arena	2:00 p.m.	1–2	10–3–2
Fri. Dec. 4	at Boston College *	Chestnut Hill, Mass.	7:00 p.m.	2–3 (OT)	10–4–2
Fri. Jan. 1	at Yale	New Haven, Conn.	3:00 p.m.	3–0	11–4–2
Tue. Jan. 5	at Princeton	Princeton, N.J.	4:00 p.m.	4–0	12–4–2
Fri. Jan. 8	NEW HAMPSHIRE * !	Boston, Mass.	4:00 p.m.	3–5	12–5–2
Mon. Jan. 11	BOSTON COLLEGE * !	Boston, Mass.		7–4	13–5–2
Fri. Jan. 15	at Maine *	Orono, Maine	7:00 p.m.	3–1	14–5–2
Wed. Jan. 20	at New Hampshire *	Durham, N.H.	7:00 p.m.	2–2	14–5–3
Sat. Jan. 23	at Niagara	Niagara, N.Y.	7:00 p.m.	2–1	15–5–3
Sun. Jan. 24	at Niagara	Niagara, N.Y.	2:00 p.m.	6–2	16–5–3
Tue. Jan. 26	BOSTON UNIVERSITY *	Matthews Arena	7:00 p.m.	2–2	16–5–4
Tue. Feb. 2	Beanpot vs. Boston University #	Cambridge, Mass.	5:00 p.m.	4–4	16–5–5
Sat. Feb. 6	PROVIDENCE *	Matthews Arena	2:00 p.m.	1–2	16–6–5
Tue. Feb. 9	Beanpot vs. Harvard #	Cambridge, Mass.	5:00 p.m.	0–1	16–7–5
Sat. Feb. 13	at Boston University *	Boston, Mass.	3:00 p.m.	2–2	16–7–6
Sun. Feb. 14	BOSTON UNIVERSITY *	Matthews Arena	2:00 p.m.	1–2	16–8–6
Sat. Feb. 20	at Connecticut *	Storrs, Conn.	1:00 p.m.	0–0	16–8–7
Sun. Feb. 21	CONNECTICUT *	Matthews Arena	1:00 p.m.	2–0	17–8–7

== Player stats ==
= Indicates team leader

=== Skaters ===
Player	Games	Goals	Assists	Points	Points/game	PIM	GWG	PPG	SHG
Kristi Kehoe	33	12	14	26	0.7879	22	2	5	0
Brittany Esposito	33	10	11	21	0.6364	18	2	3	1
Alyssa Wohlfeiler	32	10	10	20	0.6250	20	4	1	0
Lindsay Berman	33	8	12	20	0.6061	26	3	2	0
Annie Hogan	33	7	13	20	0.6061	18	1	2	0
Casey Pickett	33	10	7	17	0.5152	6	1	3	0
Rachel Llanes	33	6	7	13	0.3939	18	1	1	0
Kelly Wallace	25	6	6	12	0.4800	12	0	0	0
Katy Applin	33	1	8	9	0.2727	16	1	1	0
Julia Marty	20	1	6	7	0.3500	14	0	0	0
Stephanie Gavronsky	33	1	6	7	0.2121	26	0	0	0
Lori Antflick	32	4	2	6	0.1875	0	2	0	0
Siena Falino	30	0	5	5	0.1667	6	0	0	0
Kasey Cedorchuk	28	0	5	5	0.1786	16	0	0	0
Ginny Berg	32	0	3	3	0.0938	26	0	0	0
Casie Fields	28	1	0	1	0.0357	19	0	0	0
Lindsay Domaas	22	1	0	1	0.0455	16	0	0	0
Cassie Sperry	33	0	1	1	0.0303	0	0	0	0
Danielle Kerr	24	0	1	1	0.0417	0	0	0	0
Florence Schelling	21	0	0	0	0.0000	2	0	0	0
Leah Sulyma	13	0	0	0	0.0000	0	0	0	0
Autumn Prouty	19	0	0	0	0.0000	2	0	0	0

=== Goaltenders ===
Player	Games	Wins	Losses	Ties	Goals against	Minutes	GAA	Shutouts	Saves	Save %
Florence Schelling	21	11	5	4	29	1270	1.3703	4	537	.949
Leah Sulyma	13	6	4	3	21	741	1.7001	4	389	.949

== Hockey East tournament ==
Date	Team	Location	Score
Sat. February 27	Connecticut (8)	Matthews Arena	1–4

== Awards and honors ==
- Brittany Esposito, 2010 WHEA All-Rookie Team
- Annie Hogan, Runner up, Hockey East Best Defensive Forward
- Linda Lundrigan and Lauren McAuliffe, Runner up, Hockey East Coach of the Year
- Florence Schelling, Defensive Player of the Week (Week of October 5)
- Florence Schelling, Hockey East Defensive Player of the Week on Oct. 12
- Florence Schelling, Hockey East Defensive Player of the Week on Nov. 2
- Florence Schelling, Hockey East Co-Defensive Player of the Week on Nov. 9
- Florence Schelling, Hockey East Defensive Player of the Week for third consecutive week Nov. 16.
- Florence Schelling, Defensive Player of the Week honors Nov. 30
- Florence Schelling – Northeastern, Bauer Goaltender of the Month, October 2009
- Florence Schelling – Northeastern, Bauer Goaltender of the Month, November 2009
- Florence Schelling, Hockey East Co-Player of the Year
- Florence Schelling, 2010 WHEA First-Team All-Star
- Florence Schelling, New England Hockey Writers All-Star Team
- Leah Sulyma, Hockey East Defensive Player of the Week (Week of February 8)
