= Brown Bears women's ice hockey =

Brown University ice hockey team

- Current season
- University: Brown University
- Conference: ECAC
- Head coach: Melanie Ruzzi; 6th season
- Arena: Meehan Auditorium; Providence, Rhode Island
- Colors: Seal brown, cardinal red, and white

NCAA tournament runner-up
- 2002

NCAA tournament Frozen Four
- 2002

NCAA tournament appearances
- 2002

Conference tournament champions
- 1998, 2000, 2002

Conference regular season champions
- 1995, 1996, 1997, 2000

The Brown Bears women’s ice hockey is the program that is an NCAA Division I ice hockey team who is representing Brown University. The Bears play at the Meehan Auditorium in Providence, Rhode Island. Brown women's hockey is the oldest women's hockey program in the United States. It was the first collegiate women's ice hockey program in the United States, started in 1964. The team was led from 1989 to 2011 by Head Coach Digit Murphy, who became the winningest coach in Division I women's ice hockey history during her 18th season at Brown (2006–2007).

== History ==
Brown University Women's Ice Hockey is widely regarded as being one of the premier collegiate programs globally. Several former players are Olympic medal winners.

In 1964, the Brown Bears men's coach Jim Fullerton arranged for Nancy Schieffelin to attend a team practice. She was an experienced player and came to the practice disguised in full uniform. A year later, Brown University would have the first women’s ice hockey program. The team was known as the Pembroke Pandas. The Pandas would have to borrow equipment, and sell hockey rule sheets at the Bears men's games to raise money for equipment. In February 1966, the Pandas (Brown Bears) women’s ice hockey team played their first game. Against the Walpole Brooms, the club lost by a 4–1 score.

In 1976, Brown would host the first ever Ivy League women's ice hockey tournament. The other competing schools were Cornell, Princeton and Yale. The Big Red would win the tournament.

Between 1994 and 1997, the Bears won three consecutive ECAC regular season championships. During that time span, the Bears were undefeated in the league during the 1995–96 and 1996–97 seasons. The undefeated streak spanned 49 ECAC games. The Bears competed in the first AWCHA Division I National Ice Hockey Championship. Contested in March 1998, the Bears were defeated by the New Hampshire Wildcats by a 4–1 score.

In 1999–2000, Brown reach its second national championship final in three years. Coach Digit Murphy, who has been building the program since 1988, used virtually every player on her bench and eventually wore out opponents. She even went so far as to take the advice of a volunteer assistant coach by allowing her centers to take turns choosing the wings on their lines. Jill Graat was named captain of the team. The team withstood a season-ending ACL injury to its best player, U.S. Olympic defenseman Tara Mounsey, and went on to win nineteen straight games entering the 2000 national championship game.

Ali Brewer holds every Brown goaltending record for a season or a career. In her four seasons with the Bears, she posted a 1.37 goals-against average and a .943 save percentage. In addition, she had 2,490 saves and posting 39 shutouts. Numerous records were set by Brewer including, a 0.94 GAA and .957 save percentage in her freshman season, 13 shutouts in her junior season, and 25 wins in her senior campaign. Another record that she holds is five consecutive shutouts, set her junior season, in which she blanked Cornell (3–0), St. Lawrence (5–0), Niagara twice (6–0 both games), and Colby (9–0).

During Brewer’s four seasons, the Bears never won fewer than 20 games in a season. The Bears won ECAC Championships in 1998 and 2000, with Brewer earning MVP honors during the 2000 Championship. The Bears also played in the AWCHA Tournament three times from 1998–2000, finishing as the National Runner-Up twice.

== Season-by-season results ==
Won Championship	Lost Championship	Regular Season Conference Champions

Year	Coach	W	L	T	Conference	Conf. W	Conf. L	Conf. T	Points	Conference Rank	Conf. Tournament	NCAA Tournament
1994–95	Digit Murphy	16	4	3	ECAC	11	2	1	23	Tied 1st	Lost Quarterfinals vs. St. Lawrence (1–2)	Tournament did not exist
1995–96	Digit Murphy	16	4	5	ECAC	12	0	4	28	1st	Won Quarterfinals vs. Colby (7–2); Lost Semifinals vs. Providence (2–4)	Tournament did not exist
1996–97	Digit Murphy	28	2	1	ECAC	22	0	0	44	1st	Won Quarterfinals vs. Colby (6–2); Lost Semifinals vs. Northeastern (1–2)	Tournament did not exist
1997–98	Digit Murphy	22	7	4	ECAC	15	4	3	33	Tied 3rd	Won Quarterfinals vs. Cornell (1–0); Won Semifinals vs. Dartmouth (3–1); Won Championship vs. New Hampshire (4–3)	AWCHA; Won Semifinals vs. Northeastern (3–2); Lost Championship vs. New Hampshire (1–4)
1998–99	Digit Murphy	20	7	4	ECAC	19	4	3	41	Tied 2nd	Lost Quarterfinals vs. Dartmouth (0–3)	AWCHA; Lost Semifinals vs. Harvard (3–5); Lost Third Place Game vs. Minnesota (2–3)
1999–2000	Digit Murphy	25	4	3	ECAC	19	2	3	41	1st	Won Quarterfinals vs. Niagara (8–0); Won Semifinals vs. Northeastern (2–1); Won Championship vs. Dartmouth (6–2)	AWCHA; Won Semifinals vs. Dartmouth (4–2); Lost Championship vs. Minnesota (2–4)
2000–01	Digit Murphy	19	7	3	ECAC	15	6	3	33	4th	Won Quarterfinals vs. New Hampshire (4–3); Lost Semifinals vs. Dartmouth (2–3 OT)	—
2001–02	Digit Murphy	25	8	2	ECAC	12	3	1	25	Tied 2nd	Won Quarterfinals vs. Yale (5–0, 7–0); Won Semifinals vs. St. Lawrence (3–1); Won Championship vs. Dartmouth (4–3 OT)	Won Semifinals vs. Minnesota (2–1); Lost Championship vs. Minnesota–Duluth (2–3)
2002–03	Digit Murphy	14	14	4	ECAC	9	6	1	19	5th	Won Quarterfinals vs. St. Lawrence (1–4, 3–1, 3–1); Lost Semifinals vs. Harvard (3–10)	—
2003–04	Digit Murphy	18	11	2	ECAC	12	5	1	25	4th	Won Quarterfinals vs. Princeton (2–1, 3–2 OT); Lost Semifinals vs. Harvard (1–2 2OT)	—
2004–05	Digit Murphy	15	15	2	ECAC	11	8	1	23	Tied 5th	Lost Quarterfinals vs. St. Lawrence (3–0, 2–3, 3–5)	—
2005–06	Digit Murphy	15	13	5	ECAC	10	6	4	24	Tied 3rd	Won Quarterfinals vs. Dartmouth (4–2, 3–0); Won Semifinals vs. Princeton (1–0); Lost Championship vs. Harvard (3–4)	—
2006–07	Digit Murphy	10	17	2	ECAC	6	15	1	13	9th	—	—
2007–08	Digit Murphy	5	19	5	ECAC	4	14	4	12	10th	—	—
2008–09	Digit Murphy	7	21	1	ECAC	6	16	0	12	10th	—	—
2009–10	Digit Murphy	3	21	4	ECAC	1	18	3	5	11th	—	—
2010–11	Digit Murphy	2	23	4	ECAC	1	17	4	6	11th	—	—
2011–12	Amy Bourbeau	8	16	7	ECAC	5	13	4	14	Tied 8th	Lost Quarterfinals vs. Cornell (2–4, 0–6)	—
2012–13	Amy Bourbeau	6	20	1	ECAC	5	17	0	10	11th	—	—
2013–14	Amy Bourbeau	4	20	5	ECAC	3	16	3	9	11th	—	—
2014–15	Amy Bourbeau	5	23	1	ECAC	2	19	1	5	12th	—	—
2015–16	Robert Kenneally	3	23	3	ECAC	1	18	3	5	11th	—	—
2016–17	Robert Kenneally	5	22	0	ECAC	5	17	0	10	11th	—	—
2017–18	Robert Kenneally	2	27	0	ECAC	1	21	0	2	12th	—	—
2018–19	Carisa Wahlig	5	20	4	ECAC	2	16	4	8	11th	—	—
2019–20	Carisa Wahlig	3	23	3	ECAC	2	18	2			—	
2020–21	Did not play due to COVID 19											
2021–22	Melanie Ruzzi	6	18	5	ECAC	6	12	4	22	9th	—	—
2022–23	Melanie Ruzzi	9	19	1	ECAC	7	15	0	19	9th	—	—
2023–24	Melanie Ruzzi	12	17	3	ECAC	7	12	3	32	8th	Won Opening Round vs. RPI (1–0 OT); Lost Quarterfinals vs. Colgate (1–5, 1–5)	—
2024–25	Melanie Ruzzi	14	13	3	ECAC	9	10	3	29.5	8th	Lost Opening Round vs. Union (0–2)	—
2025-26	Melanie Ruzzi	18	14	2	ECAC	12	8	2	39	7th	Won Opening Round vs. Dartmouth (7-2) Lost Quarterfinals vs. Quinnipiac (3-6, 3-2 OT, 4-5)	—

== Current roster ==
As of September 7, 2022.

No.	Nat.	Player	Class	Pos	Height	DoB	Hometown	Previous team
1		Grace Kedziora	Sophomore	G	5' 6" (1.68 m)	2002-12-08	Chicago, Illinois	Chicago Young Americans
2		Cassidy Piersiak	Junior	D	5' 7" (1.7 m)	2001-04-22	Needham, Massachusetts	Noble and Greenough School
3		Hannah Partigianoni	Sophomore	F	5' 4" (1.63 m)	2003-01-01	Cortland, New York	Cortland High School
4		Anna Shelden	Sophomore	F	5' 4" (1.63 m)	2001-10-14	Kenai, Alaska	New Hampton School
5		Ellie Gauvin	Freshman	D	5' 8" (1.73 m)	2004-04-14	Moose Jaw, Saskatchewan	Notre Dame Hounds
6		Maya Mangiafico	Junior	F	5' 6" (1.68 m)	2001-04-01	Medfield, Massachusetts	Buckingham Browne & Nichols School
8		Meadow Carman	Sophomore	D	5' 10" (1.78 m)	2000-10-05	Barton, Nova Scotia	North York Storm
9		Vivian Lu	Senior	D	5' 7" (1.7 m)	1999-12-22	Studio City, California	KRS Vanke Rays
10		Abby Hancock	Sophomore	D	5' 7" (1.7 m)	2003-01-08	Maple Grove, Minnesota	Benilde-St. Margaret's
12		Paige Gross	Sophomore	F	5' 8" (1.73 m)	2003-07-28	Clarence, New York	Nichols School
13		Madie Stockfish (A)	Junior	F	5' 7" (1.7 m)	2000-08-02	North Bay, Ontario	Kingston Jr. Ice Wolves
14		Rose Jeneault	Sophomore	D	5' 9" (1.75 m)	2002-05-20	Ogdensburg, New York	Nepean Jr. Wildcats
16		Maddie Morgan	Freshman	D	5' 5" (1.65 m)	2003-10-25	Edina, Minnesota	Holy Family Catholic High School
17		Sonja Bjornson	Junior	F	5' 3" (1.6 m)	2001-01-25	Philadelphia, Pennsylvania	Providence College
18		Eva Durandeau	Senior	D	5' 7" (1.7 m)	2000-09-01	Beaconsfield, Quebec	Cégep Édouard-Montpetit
19		Anna Gallagher	Junior	F	5' 2" (1.57 m)	2002-07-10	Hermosa Beach, California	North American Hockey Academy
21		Jade Iginla	Freshman	F	5' 7" (1.7 m)	2004-10-19	Lake Country, British Columbia	Rink Hockey Academy Kelowna
22		Anna Hurd	Sophomore	F	5' 3" (1.6 m)	2002-01-01	Pelham, New York	Phillips Academy
23		Cameron Sikich	Sophomore	D	5' 5" (1.65 m)	2003-06-09	Thornhill, Ontario	Etobicoke Jr. Dolphins
24		Jess Ciarrocchi	Junior	F	5' 4" (1.63 m)	2002-02-24	West Chester, Pennsylvania	Penn State University
25		Olivia Williamson	Sophomore	F	5' 10" (1.78 m)	2002-07-07	Faribault, Minnesota	Faribault High School
26		India McDadi	Freshman	F	5' 4" (1.63 m)	2004-04-01	Mississauga, Ontario	Philadelphia Jr. Flyers
28		Lily Lacey	Junior	F	5' 2" (1.57 m)	2002-01-11	Toronto, Ontario	Toronto Leaside Jr. Wildcats
33		Mégane Pilon	Freshman	G	5' 8" (1.73 m)	2004-02-01	Saint-Jérôme, Quebec	Stanstead College
39		Kaley Doyle	Junior	G	5' 5" (1.65 m)	2001-03-23	Livonia, Michigan	Meijer AAA

== Olympians ==
- Jacquie Pierri (Italy): Ice hockey at the 2026 Winter Olympics – Women's tournament.
- Pam Dreyer (United States): 2006 Torino (Bronze)
- Kim Insalaco (United States): 2006 Torino (Bronze)
- Kathleen Kauth (United States): 2006 Torino (Bronze)
- Becky Kellar-Duke (Canada): 1998 Nagano (Silver), 2002 Salt Lake (Gold), 2006 Torino (Gold), 2010 Vancouver (Gold)
- Katie King-Crowley (United States): 1998 Nagano (Gold), 2002 Salt Lake (Silver), 2006 Torino (Bronze)
- Tara Mounsey (United States): 1998 Nagano (Gold), 2002 Salt Lake (Silver)
- Chie Chie Sakuma (Japan): 1998 Nagano

== Awards and honors ==
- Ali Brewer, 1998 and 2000 ECAC Tournament Most Valuable Player,
- Ali Brewer, 1999 American Women's College Hockey Alliance All-Americans, First Team
- Ali Brewer, Patty Kazmaier Award Finalist, 1999
- Ali Brewer, Patty Kazmaier Award (2000)
- Ali Brewer, Women's Ivy League Outstanding Performers (2000)
- Ali Brewer, Women's First Team All-Ivy League (1999)
- Ali Brewer, Women's First Team All-Ivy League (2000)
- Ali Brewer, Ivy League Player of the Year (2000)
- Ali Brewer, ECAC Goaltender of the Year (2000)
- Ali Brewer, First Team All-ECAC (2000)
- Mardie Corcoran, 1986 Marjorie Brown Smith Award
- Pam Dreyer, 2001–02 New England Hockey Writers Women's Divions I All-Star Team
- Pam Dreyer, Goalie, 2002 ECAC North Second Team
- Pam Dreyer, 2002 ECAC Tournament Most Valuable Player,
- Katie King, Forward, 1996 All-ECAC Team
- Katie King, 1997 Marjorie Brown Smith Award
- Katie King, 1997 ECAC Player of the Year Award
- Katie Jamieson, 2010 Second Team All-Ivy
- Laurie Jolin, ECAC Rookie of the Week (Week of February 22, 2010)
- Courtney Johnson, 2002 ECAC All Academic Team
- Courtney Johnson, 2002 Academic All-Ivy
- Courtney Johnson, US College Hockey Online Player of the Week (Jan. 14, 2002)
- Becky Kellar, 1996 ECAC All-Tournament team
- Becky Kellar, 1996 ECAC Honor Roll
- Jessica Link, Forward, 2002 ECAC North All-Rookie Team
- Jessica Link, 2002 ECAC All-Rookie Team
- Jessica Link, 2002 Second Team All-Ivy honors
- Jessica Link, ECAC Rookie of the Week (Jan. 28, 2002)
- Jessica Link, 2002 Sakuma Award winner.
- Hayley Moore, Forward, First Team All-Ivy League, 2007–08, Brown (Senior)
- Kathryn Moss, 2007 Marjorie Brown Smith Award
- Tara Mounsey, 1997 ECAC Rookie of the Year
- Tara Mounsey, 1999 American Women's College Hockey Alliance All-Americans, Second Team
- Tara Mounsey, 2000 Marjorie Brown Smith Award
- Tara Mounsey, Patty Kazmaier Award Finalist, 1999, 2000
- Digit Murphy, New England Hockey Writers 2001–02 Women's Coach of the Year
- Paige Pyett, Defense, 2009 ECAC All-Rookie Team
- Emily Sigman, 2002 ECAC All Academic Team
- Christina Sorbara, 2001 Sarah Devens Award
- Nicole Stock, Second Team All-Ivy League, 2007–08, Goaltender, Brown (Junior)
- Nicole Stock, Goaltender, 2009 Third Team All-ECAC
- Cassie Turner, 2001–02 New England Hockey Writers Women's Divions I All-Star Team
- Cassie Turner, Defense, 2002 ECAC North First Team
- Kristy Zamora, ECAC Player of the Week (Awarded December 11, 2001)
- Kristy Zamora, 2001–02 New England Hockey Writers Women's Divions I All-Star Team
- Kristy Zamora, Forward, 2002 ECAC North First Team

=== Alli McMillan '74 Award ===
- Emilie Bydwell 2007 Alli McMillan '74 Award as the team's unsung hero.

=== Chelsea McMillan '98 Award ===
- Kim Fleet, 2002 Chelsea McMillan '98 Award for pride and perseverance
- Emilie Bydwell 2006 Chelsea McMillan '98 Award for pride and perseverance.

=== Kate Silver '86 Award ===
In recognition of an outstanding first year female varsity athlete at Brown University

- Katie King, Kate Silver '86 Award (1994)
- Jessica Link, Kate Silver '86 Award (2002)
- Kathryn Moss, Kate Silver '86 Award (2004)
- Tara Mounsey, Kate Silver '86 Award (1997)

=== Sakuma Award ===
The Sakuma Award is a team award given for perfect attendance at practices and games.

- Kim Fleet, 2002 Sakuma Award winner for perfect attendance at all practices and games.
- Courtney Johnson 2000, 2001 Sakuma Award winner for perfect attendance at practices and games.
- Kristy Zamora, 1999, 2000

=== Ivy League honors ===
- Kristy Zamora, Brown, 2002 Ivy League Player of the Year

==== All-Ivy ====
- Kristy Zamora, Forward, Senior, 2002 First Team All-Ivy League
- Cassie Turner, Defense, Junior, 2002 First Team All-Ivy League
- Katie Germain, Goalie, Sophomore, 2002 First Team All-Ivy League
- Jessica Link, Forward, Freshman, 2002 Second Team All-Ivy League
- Meredith Ostrander, Defense, Senior, 2002 All-Ivy League Honorable Mention
- Sam Donovan, 2017–18 Honorable Mention All-Ivy
- Kaley Doyle, 2022-23 Second Team All-Ivy
- Monique Lyons, 2025-26 Second Team All-Ivy
- Isabella Gratzl, 2025-26 Second Team All-Ivy
- India McDadi, 2025-26 Honorable Mention All-Ivy
- Gali Levy, 2025-26 Academic All-Ivy

== Bears in professional hockey ==
= CWHL All-Star	= NWHL All-Star	= Clarkson Cup Champion	= Isobel Cup Champion

Player	Position	Team(s)	League(s)	Years	Championships
Kim Insalaco	Forward	Oakville Ice	NWHL (1999–2007)		
Kathleen Kauth	Forward	Brampton Thunder	NWHL founded in 1999	4	
Becky Kellar	Defense	Toronto Aeros; Oakville Ice; Burlington Barracudas	NWHL founded in 1999; CWHL	11	
Erica Kromm	Forward	Calgary Inferno	CWHL	7	2 (2016 and 2019)
Hayley Moore	Forward	Boston Blades; Boston Pride	CWHL; NWHL	2	2017 Isobel Cup as GM
Jacquie Pierri	Defense	Calgary Inferno; SDE	CWHL; SDHL		2016 Clarkson Cup
Meredith Ostrander	Defense	Brampton Thunder	CWHL	6	
Kristy Zamora	Forward	Mississauga Chiefs; Toronto Furies	CWHL	12	2014 Clarkson Cup
Shay Maloney	Forward	Boston Fleet	PWHL	3	
Kaley Doyle	Goaltender	New York Sirens	PWHL	2	
Jade Iginla	Forward	PWHL Hamilton	PWHL	1	

== See also ==
- Brown Bears men's ice hockey
- Brown Bears
- List of college women's ice hockey coaches with 250 wins (Digit Murphy ranks fourth on all-time list)
