= 2002–03 Brown Bears women's ice hockey season =

Brown University's official team

The 2002-03 Brown Bears women's ice hockey team represented Brown University.

== Regular season ==
Jessica Link led the Bears in scoring with 39 points (20 goals and 19 assists). Link's 20 goals led the team and her 19 assists were good enough for third overall. Link tied for the ECAC lead in short-handed points with three. After two seasons, Link climbed to 24th on Brown's all-time scoring list.

=== Skaters ===
Player	Games Played	Goals	Assists	Points	Game Winning Goals
Jessica Link	32	20	19	39	3
Karen Thatcher	32	12	23	35	3

=== Goaltenders ===
Player	Games Played	Wins	Losses	Ties	Goals Against	Minutes	Goals Against Average	Shutouts	Saves	Save Percentage

== Awards and honors ==
- Jessica Link, Second Team All-ECAC
- Jessica Link, All-Ivy Honorable Mention honors
- Jessica Link, ECAC Player of the Week on 1/14.
