= Chie Sakuma =

Japanese-American ice hockey player and administrator

Chie Sakuma 佐久間 千絵
- Born: 1 March 1972 (age 54) Houston, Texas, United States
- Height: 158 cm (5 ft 2 in)
- Weight: 63 kg (139 lb; 9 st 13 lb)
- Position: Defence
- Played for: Iwakura Peregrine; Brown Bears
- National team: Japan
- Playing career: 1990–c. 1998

Chie Chie Yard née Sakuma, also known as Chie Sakuma (佐久間 千絵, Sakuma Chie) is a Japanese-American retired ice hockey player, currently serving as the National Hockey League (NHL) Vice President of Events. She represented Japan in the women's tournament at the 1998 Winter Olympics.

== Playing career ==
Sakuma was introduced to hockey by her older brother, Teppei, and began playing as a child in her hometown of Houston, Texas. When she was 10, Sakuma's father, Hajime, coached her on a boys' peewee team. Connections Hajime had forged with the ice hockey community in Japan made it possible for the team to travel from Houston to Hokkaido for a tournament.

Sakuma's college ice hockey career was played with the Brown Bears women's ice hockey program under head coach Digit Murphy during 1990 to 1994.

Several months after graduating from Brown University with a degree in anthropology and management, she moved to Japan. While living in Japan, Sakuma worked as a translator for the owner of a major trucking company, who was also president of the Hokkaido hockey association. She played ice hockey with the company-sponsored Iwakura Peregrine of the All-Japan Women's Ice Hockey Championship and with the fledgling Japanese national team. Born and raised in the United States, Sakuma qualified to play for Japan because of her ancestry.

== NHL career ==
Following the 1998 Olympics, Sakuma joined the NHL as an intern. As of 2021, she is NHL Vice President of Events, with a portfolio that includes such signature events as Kraft Hockeyville, the NHL Winter Classic, the NHL All-Star Game, NHL Awards, outdoor hockey games, and numerous other projects.

== Awards ==
In 2018, Sakuma was selected as a part of Sports Business Journal's eighth annual class of Game Changers.
