= 2009–10 Maine Black Bears women's ice hockey season =

- Conference: 8 Hockey East
- Home ice: Alfond Arena

Rankings
- USA Today/USA Hockey Magazine: Not ranked
- USCHO.com/CBS College Sports: Not ranked

Record
- Overall: 8-20-5

Coaches and captains
- Head coach: Dan Lichterman
- Alternate captain: Amy Stech

The following is a list of events and statistics from the 2009–2010 Maine Black Bears women's ice hockey season. The Black Bears are an ice hockey team which represent the University of Maine. The head coach is Dan Lichterman. Assisting him are Karine Senecal, Sara Simard, and Meghan MacDonald.

== Offseason ==
- July 16: The 2009 Battle of the Bears trophy goes to the Women's Ice Hockey team. They topped all other Maine Black Bears teams with 2,594 points. The women's ice hockey team earned the win by earning the highest GPA of all sports teams for the academic year. The team was also awarded the Black Bear Citizenship Award this spring for their commitment to service throughout the year.
- July 27: Head coach Dan Lichterman has announced that the program has received an additional commitment for the 2009–10 season. Darcia Leimgruber will join the Black Bears in the fall of 2009. Leimgruber is a 5-foot 3-inch forward from Basel, Switzerland.

== Regular season ==
- December: Jenna Ouellette played in four games and accumulated nine points (5 goals, 4 assists) leading the Black Bears to three victories. She recorded a point in all four games and notched multiple points in three games. She played a part in nine of the 12 Black Bear goals in December and assisted on all four goals vs. Vermont on Dec. 4. She scored the game-winning goal while on the power play in a 1–0 win over Vermont (12/5). In addition, she notched a pair of goals against Union (12/11) and another pair in the finale at Union (12/12).
- January 26: Maine freshman forward Darcia Leimgruber (Basel, Switzerland) has been named to the Team Switzerland Olympic Women's Ice Hockey team that will represent Switzerland at the 2010 Winter Olympic Games in Vancouver, B.C. Leimgruber is the third Black Bear to have ties to the Women's Ice Hockey Olympic games. Raffi Wolf represented the Black Bears when she played on Team Germany at the 2002 games in Salt Lake City as well as the 2006 Torino games. Former club hockey student-athlete, Stacey Livingston, officiated the gold medal game at the 1998 Olympics in Nagano, Japan.

=== Standings ===
2009–10 Hockey East Association standings
	Conference								Overall					
	GP	W	L	T	SOW	PTS	GF	GA	GP	W	L	T	GF	GA
Providence	21	11	5	5	3	30	59	44	34	15	10	9	91	76
New Hampshire	21	13	6	2	0	28	65	41	31	19	7	5	98	60
Boston University	21	10	6	5	3	28	54	41	34	14	8	12	93	80
Northeastern	21	9	6	6	4	28	45	34	32	17	8	7	77	47
Connecticut	21	10	5	6	1	27	46	33	34	19	8	7	87	57
Boston College	21	7	10	4	4	22	41	54	34	8	16	10	63	97
Vermont	21	5	15	1	0	11	26	55	33	10	22	1	52	90
Maine	21	3	15	3	1	10	24	58	31	6	20	5	63	85

=== Roster ===
Number	Name	Position	Height	Class
1	Kylie Smith	Goalie	5-3	FR
3	Chloe Tinkler	Defense	5-8	FR
4	Ashley Norum	Defense	5-9	SO
5	Kaitlin Zeek	Forward	5-4	JR
6	Amy Stech	Forward	5-10	SR
7	Madelene Eriksson	Defense	5-6	JR
8	Jenna Ouellette	Forward	5-5	SR
9	Myriam Croussette	Forward	5-0	SO
10	Jordan Colliton	Forward	5-9	JR
11	Jennie Gallo	Forward	5-2	JR
12	Melissa Gagnon	Defense	5-7	SO
15	Taryn Peacock	Forward	5-5	SR
16	Dominique Goutsis	Forward	5-0	SO
17	Abby Barton	Forward	5-5	SR
18	Lexie Hoffmeyer	Defense	5-4	SR
19	Brittany Dougherty	Forward	5-7	FR
20	Jessica Bond	Defense	5-9	SO
21	Dawn Sullivan	Forward	5-7	SO
22	Brianne Kilgour	Forward	5-4	FR
23	Elyce Thomas	Defense	5-7	SR
24	Darcia Leimgruber	Forward	5-3	FR
25	Danielle Cyr	Forward	5-4	JR
29	Brittany Ott	Goalie	5-3	FR
30	Candice Currier	Goaltender	5-9	SO

=== Schedule ===
Date	Opponent	Location	Time	Score	Record
09/25/09	vs. Sacred Heart	Orono, Maine	7:00 p.m. ET	W, 9-0	1-0-0
09/26/09	vs. Sacred Heart	Orono, Maine	2:00 p.m. ET	W, 11-4	2-0-0
10/02/09	at Providence *	Providence, R.I.	7:00 p.m. ET	Loss, 4-0	2-1-0
10/03/09	at Providence *	Providence, R.I.	4:00 p.m. ET	Loss, 2-1	2-2-0
10/09/09	vs. Minnesota State-Mankato	Orono, Maine	7:00 p.m. ET	Loss, 5-2	2-3-0
10/10/09	vs. Minnesota State-Mankato	Orono, Maine	2:00 p.m. ET	Loss, 2-1	2-4-0
10/18/09	at Boston College *	Chestnut Hill, Mass.	2:00 p.m. ET	Tie, 1-1	2-4-1
10/23/09	vs. Robert Morris	Orono, Maine	7:00 p.m. ET	L, 3-1	2-5-1
10/24/09	vs. Robert Morris	Orono, Maine	2:00 p.m. ET	L,1-0 (OT)	2-6-1
11/01/09	at New Hampshire *	Durham, N.H.	3:00 p.m. ET	L, 5-0	2-7-1
11/06/09	vs. Providence *	Orono, Maine	7:00 p.m. ET	Tie, 2-2	2-7-2
11/08/09	vs. Connecticut *	Orono, Maine	12:00 p.m. ET	L, 7-2	2-8-2
11/14/09	at Northeastern *	Boston, Mass	2:00 p.m. ET	L,5-1	2-9-2
11/15/09	at Northeastern *	Boston, Mass	2:00 p.m. ET	W,1-0	3-9-2
11/24/09	vs. Boston University *	Lewiston, Maine	7:00 p.m. ET	Tie, 1-1	3-9-3
11/27/09	at North Dakota	Grand Forks, ND	3:00 p.m. ET	Tie, 5-5	3-9-4
11/28/09	at North Dakota	Grand Forks, ND	3:00 p.m. ET	Tie, 3-3	3-9-5
12/04/09	vs. Vermont *	Orono, Maine	2:00 p.m. ET	W, 4-1	4-9-5
12/05/09	vs. Vermont *	Orono, Maine	2:00 p.m. ET	W, 1-0	5-9-5
12/11/09	at Union	Schenectady, N.Y.	2:00 p.m. ET	L, 4-3	5-10-5
12/12/09	at Union	Schenectady, N.Y.	2:00 p.m. ET	W, 4-0	6-10-5
01/02/10	vs. University of Moncton (exh)	Orono, Maine	2:00 p.m. ET	Maine, 4-2	7-10-5
01/03/10	vs. University of Moncton (exh)	Orono, Maine	2:00 p.m. ET	Maine, 6-3	8-10-5
01/15/10	vs. Northeastern *	Orono, Maine	7:00 p.m. ET	L, 3-1	8-11-5
01/22/10	at Connecticut *	Storrs, Conn.	7:00 p.m. ET	L,4-1	8-12-5
01/23/10	at Connecticut *	Storrs, Conn.	4:00 p.m. ET	L,2-1	8-13-5
01/29/10	vs. New Hampshire *	Orono, Maine	7:00 p.m. ET	L,5-2	8-14-5
01/30/10	vs. New Hampshire *	Orono, Maine		L,3-1	8-15-5
02/06/10	at Vermont *	Burlington, Vt.	2:00 p.m. ET	L,1-0	8-16-5
02/12/10	vs. Boston College *	Orono, Maine	7:00 p.m. ET	L,3-2	8-17-5
02/13/10	vs. Boston College *	Orono, Maine		L,4-1	8-18-5
02/20/10	at Boston University *	Boston, Mass	3:00 p.m. ET	L,3-1	8-19-5
02/21/10	at Boston University *	Boston, Mass	3:00 p.m. ET	L,2-0	8-20-5

== Player stats ==
= Indicates team leader

=== Skaters ===
Player	Games Played	Goals	Assists	Points	Shots	+/-	Penalty Minutes
Jenna Ouellette	27	11	16	27	56	-4	12
Taryn Peacock	28	7	14	21	51	-5	30
Lexie Hoffmeyer	28	4	14	18	90	-5	32
Jennie Gallo	26	7	9	16	63	-7	14
Myriam Croussette	29	6	5	11	31	-8	14
Brittany Dougherty	26	3	6	9	44	-3	6
Jessica Bond	28	1	8	9	56	+3	26
Amy Stech	29	3	5	8	60	-1	16
Dawn Sullivan	29	3	4	7	46	-11	4
Jordan Colliton	21	3	3	6	23	-8	4
Abby Barton	27	4	1	5	47	-3	20
Dominique Goutsis	29	3	2	5	41	-5	32
Ashley Norum	28	2	2	4	31	-11	28
Melissa Gagnon	24	1	3	4	32	-16	14
Brianne Kilgour	4	2	1	3	9	0	6
Darcia Leimgruber	6	1	1	2	6	+2	4
Kaitlin Zeek	27	1	1	2	11	-1	0
Brittany Ott	19	0	2	2	0	0	0
Chloe Tinkler	29	0	2	2	16	-6	10
Elyce Thomas	29	0	1	1	33	-10	28
Danielle Cyr	25	0	0	0	3	-1	0
Madeleine Eriksson	20	0	0	0	5	-2	2

=== Goaltenders ===
Player	Games Played	Minutes	Goals Against	Wins	Losses	Ties	Shutouts	Saves	Goals Against Average
Brittany Ott	19	1099:50	47	4	11	3	2	521	2.56
Candice Currier	11	651:11	32	2	7	2	2	294	2.95

== Awards and honors ==
- Abby Barton, Hockey East Association Academic All-Star Team
- Brittany Ott, 2010 WHEA All-Rookie Team
- Jenna Ouellette – Maine, WHEA Player of the Month, December 2009
- Jenna Ouellette, Hockey East Association Academic All-Star Team
- Amy Stech, Runner up, Hockey East Sportsmanship Award

=== Hockey East all-academic team ===
- Abby Barton
- Jenna Ouellette
- Amy Stech
- Danielle Cyr
- Jennie Gallo
- Jessica Bond
- Candice Currier
- Melissa Gagnon
- Ashley Norum
- Dawn Sullivan
- Kylie Smith
- Chloe Tinker
