= 2000–01 Brown Bears women's ice hockey season =

American college ice hockey team season

The 2000-01 Brown Bears women's ice hockey team represented Brown University.

== Regular season ==
- Freshman Kim Fleet only appeared in 13 games.
- Courtney Johnson appeared in 29 games and registered three game-winning goals. All 11 of her goals came in ECAC games. Johnson would rank third on the Bears in points accumulated in ECAC contests.
- Kristy Zamora was the top returning goal scorer for the Bears from the previous campaign. Zamora appeared in all 29 games for the team.

== Player stats ==
=== Skaters ===
Player	Games Played	Goals	Assists	Points	Game Winning Goals
Kathleen Kauth	29	16	23	39	4

=== Goaltenders ===
Player	Games Played	Wins	Losses	Ties	Goals Against	Minutes	Goals Against Average	Shutouts	Saves	Save Percentage

== Awards and honors ==
- Courtney Johnson, Sakuma Award winner
- Christina Sorbara, 2001 Sarah Devens Award
