= 2009–10 Vermont Catamounts women's ice hockey season =

- Conference: Hockey East
- Home ice: Gutterson Fieldhouse

Rankings
- USA Today/USA Hockey Magazine: Not ranked
- USCHO.com/CBS College Sports: Not ranked

Record
- Overall: 10-22-1

Coaches and captains
- Head coach: Tim Bothwell
- Captain: Brittany Nelson
- Alternate captain: Chelsea Furlani

The 2009–10 Vermont Catamounts women's ice hockey season was coached by head coach Tim Bothwell, assisted by Grant Kimball and Mike Gilligan. The athletic trainer was Grant Wilson, and the strength & conditioning coach was Justin Goulet.

== Offseason ==
- Grant Kimball was hired to become the associate head coach for the University of Vermont women's hockey coaching staff. Kimball, a native of Harvard, Mass., came to Vermont after two seasons as an assistant coach with the University of North Dakota women's hockey program.

== Exhibition ==
Date	Opponent	Time	Score	Record
Oct. 4	McGill (preseason)	7:00pm	McGill, 2-1	0-1

== Regular season ==
=== Standings ===
2009–10 Hockey East Association standings
	Conference								Overall					
	GP	W	L	T	SOW	PTS	GF	GA	GP	W	L	T	GF	GA
Providence	21	11	5	5	3	30	59	44	34	15	10	9	91	76
New Hampshire	21	13	6	2	0	28	65	41	31	19	7	5	98	60
Boston University	21	10	6	5	3	28	54	41	34	14	8	12	93	80
Northeastern	21	9	6	6	4	28	45	34	32	17	8	7	77	47
Connecticut	21	10	5	6	1	27	46	33	34	19	8	7	87	57
Boston College	21	7	10	4	4	22	41	54	34	8	16	10	63	97
Vermont	21	5	15	1	0	11	26	55	33	10	22	1	52	90
Maine	21	3	15	3	1	10	24	58	31	6	20	5	63	85

=== Roster ===
Number	Name	Class	Position	Height
1	Ilana Friedman	Fr	G	
4	Saleah Morrison	Jr	D	5-4
6	Maggie Walsh	Fr	D	
7	Kailey Nash	So	D	5-1
9	Channing Ahbe	So	F	5-3
10	Chelsea Furlani	Sr	F	5-4
11	Emily Walsh	Fr	F	
12	Celeste Doucet	Jr	F	5-11
13	Teddy Fortin	Jr	F	5-11
14	Peggy Wakeham	Jr	D	5-6
15	Hannah Westbrook	Jr	D	5-4
16	Brittany Nelson	Sr	F	5-7
18	Erin Wente	Fr	F	
19	Jackie Thode	Sr	D	5-5
20	Lindsey Cashman	Jr	F	5-7
21	Melanie Greene	Sr	D	5-11
22	Chelsea Rapin	So	F	5-3
24	Jul Sifers	Jr	F	5-7
25	Shannon Bellefeuille	So	D	5-7
27	Erin Barley-Maloney	So	F	5-5
31	Caitlin Whitlock	So	G	5-5
35	Kristen Olychuck	Sr	G	5-7

=== Schedule ===
Date	Opponent	Time	Score	Record
Oct. 9	Union	7:00pm	2-0	1-0-0
Oct. 10	Union	4:00pm	4-1	2-0-0
Oct. 16	Clarkson	7:00pm	0-4	
Oct. 17	Clarkson	2:00pm	4-1	
Oct. 23	Princeton	7:00pm	4-3	
Oct. 24	Princeton	4:00pm	2-7	
Oct. 30	Northeastern	7:00pm	0-3	
Oct. 31	Northeastern	4:00pm	0-1	
Nov. 6	at Boston College	7:00pm	0-3	
Nov. 7	at Boston College	4:00pm	5-1	
Nov. 11	at Boston University	7:00pm	0-4	
Nov. 20	Boston College	7:00pm	3-3	
Nov. 25	at Northeastern	3:00pm	0-1	
Nov. 28	Dartmouth	7:00pm	3-4	
Dec. 4	at Maine	2:00pm	1-4	
Dec. 5	at Maine	2:00pm	0-1	
Dec. 30	at Dartmouth	7:00pm	2-4	
Jan. 2	at Yale		1-3	
Jan. 3	at Brown		0-1	
Jan. 8	at Wayne State	7:00pm	2-5	
Jan. 9	at Wayne State	2:00pm	2-1	
Jan. 16	Connecticut	2:00pm	1-5	
Jan. 17	Connecticut	2:00pm	1-4	
Jan. 22	Boston University	7:00pm	2-1	
Jan. 23	Boston University	4:00pm	2-3	
Jan. 29	at Providence	7:00pm	2-1	
Jan. 30	at Connecticut	2:00pm	0-2	
Feb. 6	Maine	2:00pm	2-1	
Feb. 13	at New Hampshire	2:00pm	1-0	
Feb. 14	at New Hampshire	2:00pm	0-4	
Feb. 19	Providence	7:00pm	2-4	
Feb. 20	Providence	4:00pm	2-5	

== Player stats ==
= Indicates team leader

=== Skaters ===
Player	Games	Goals	Assists	Points	Points/game	PIM	GWG	PPG	SHG
Chelsea Furlani	33	8	9	17	0.5152	12	0	5	0
Celeste Doucet	32	7	7	14	0.4375	26	0	2	1
Kailey Nash	32	8	5	13	0.4063	30	3	7	0
Emily Walsh	32	4	8	12	0.3750	37	0	3	0
Brittany Nelson	33	4	8	12	0.3636	26	3	3	0
Maggie Walsh	31	2	8	10	0.3226	32	0	0	0
Erin Wente	31	6	3	9	0.2903	18	2	2	0
Peggy Wakeham	32	2	7	9	0.2813	42	1	1	0
Erin Barley-Maloney	19	1	7	8	0.4211	8	0	0	0
Chelsea Rapin	32	6	1	7	0.2188	24	1	1	0
Jackie Thode	32	1	4	5	0.1563	22	0	0	0
Saleah Morrison	32	1	4	5	0.1563	16	0	0	0
Teddy Fortin	33	0	5	5	0.1515	16	0	0	0
Hannah Westbrook	32	0	3	3	0.0938	16	0	0	0
Jul Sifers	32	2	0	2	0.0625	27	0	1	0
Channing Ahbe	10	0	2	2	0.2000	16	0	0	0
Melanie Greene	28	0	1	1	0.0357	36	0	0	0
Shannon Bellefeuille	23	0	1	1	0.0435	12	0	0	0
Kristen Olychuck	32	0	1	1	0.0313	0	0	0	0
Lindsey Cashman	32	0	1	1	0.0313	2	0	0	0
Caitlin Whitlock	1	0	0	0	0.0000	0	0	0	0

=== Goaltenders ===
Player	Games	Wins	Losses	Ties	Goals against	Minutes	GAA	Shutouts	Saves	Save %
Kristen Olychuck	32	10	21	1	82	1913	2.5725	2	678	.892
Caitlin Whitlock	1	0	1	0	3	58	3.1017	0	15	.833

== Awards and honors ==
- A Hockey East leading 13 Catamounts were named to the Hockey East All-Academic team
- Chelsea Furlani was named one of four WHEA Top Scholar-Athletes
- Furlani and Kristen Olychuck were both named to the Hockey East Academic All-Star Team

=== Team records ===
- Team Single Season Record, Most Games Won, Division I, 10, 2009–10
- Team Single Season Record, Most Games Won, Hockey East, 5, 2009–10
- Team Single Season Record, Most Games Won, Home, 7, (2009–10)
- Individual Single Game Record, Most Assists, 3, Maggie Walsh, at Boston College (11/7/09)
- Individual Single Season Record, Most Power Play Goals, 7, Kailey nash (2009–10)
