= 2001–02 Brown Bears women's ice hockey season =

- Conference: ECAC
- Home ice: Meehan Auditorium

Rankings
- USA Today/USA Hockey Magazine: TBD
- USCHO.com/CBS College Sports: TBD

Record
- Overall: 25–8–2

Coaches and captains
- Head coach: Digit Murphy

The 2001–02 Brown Bears women’s ice hockey team represented Brown University. The Bears qualified for their first NCAA Frozen Four title game.

== Regular season ==
- December 8–9: Kristy Zamora registered four points in Brown's two games. She had an assist in the Saturday loss to the Northeastern Huskies women's ice hockey program. The Huskies prevailed 2–1. Zamora got the assist on the Bears goal scored by Jessica Link. On Sunday, December 9, Zamora got a hat trick as the Bears beat the Providence Friars women's ice hockey program by a 4–0 score. Two of her goals were scored in the third period in a twenty-five second span. It was Zamora's first hat trick of the season. The last hat trick (registered in 2001) also came against the Friars in February 2001.

== Notable players ==
- Courtney Johnson served as assistant captain while ranking fourth on the Bears in points. She had nine goals, twenty-seven assists (good for second on the team) and 36 total points.

== Player stats ==
=== Skaters ===
Player	Games Played	Goals	Assists	Points	Game Winning Goals
Kristy Zamora	35	35	21	56	6
Jessica Link	35	19	23	42	3
Kim Insalaco	29	14	26	40	4
Courtney Johnson	35	9	27	36	1
Krissy McManus	35	17	17	34	3
Meredith Ostrander	35	5	28	33	0
Kerry Nugent	35	7	18	25	2
Cassie Turner	35	4	17	21	1
Katie Guay	35	10	5	15	4
Katie Lafleur	31	4	10	14	0
Mandy McCurdy	35	3	9	12	0
Emily Sigman	34	0	11	11	0
Marguerite MacDonald	35	4	6	10	0
Kelly Sheridan	35	2	7	9	0
Jenny Rice	35	2	6	8	0
Kate Kenny	35	2	4	6	1
Sarah Crowley	32	2	2	4	0
Amy McLaughlin	5	2	2	4	0
Kim Fleet	23	0	2	2	0
Katie Germain	18	0	0	0	0
Chelsea Loughran	4	0	0	0	0
Pam Dreyer	19	0	0	0	0
Whitney Talbot	17	0	0	0	0

=== Goaltenders ===
Player	Games Played	Wins	Losses	Ties	Goals Against	Minutes	Goals Against Average	Shutouts	Saves	Save Percentage
Kristy Zamora	1	0	0	0	0	20	0.0000	0	4	1.000
Pam Dreyer	19	13	4	2	29	1122	1.5509	4	435	.938
Katie Germain	18	12	4	0	28	971	1.7299	5	308	.917

== Awards and honors ==
- Pam Dreyer, 2002 ECAC Tournament Most Valuable Player,
- Kim Fleet, Chelsea McMillan Award for pride and perseverance
- Kim Fleet, Sakuma Award winner for perfect attendance at all practices and games.
- Courtney Johnson, 2002 ECAC All Academic Team
- Courtney Johnson, 2002 Academic All-Ivy
- Courtney Johnson, US College Hockey Online Player of the Week (Jan. 14, 2002)
- Jessica Link, 2002 ECAC All-Rookie Team
- Jessica Link, 2002 Second Team All-Ivy honors
- Jessica Link, ECAC Rookie of the Week (Jan. 28, 2002)
- Jessica Link, 2002 Kate Silver Award, recognizing her as the outstanding first year female varsity athlete at Brown University
- Jessica Link, 2002 Sakuma Award winner.
- Kristy Zamora, ECAC Player of the Week (Awarded December 11)

=== Ivy League honors ===
- Kristy Zamora, Forward, Senior, 2002 First Team All-Ivy League
- Cassie Turner, Defense, Junior, 2002 First Team All-Ivy League
- Katie Germain, Goalie, Sophomore, 2002 First Team All-Ivy League
- Jessica Link, Forward, Freshman, 2002 Second Team All-Ivy League
- Meredith Ostrander, Defense, Senior, 2002 All-Ivy League Honorable Mention
- Kristy Zamora, Brown, 2002 Ivy League Player of the Year

=== NCAA All-Tournament Team ===
- Meredith Ostrander, Defense
- Kristy Zamora, Forward
- Kristy Zamora, NCAA Tournament Most Outstanding Player

== Frozen Four ==
National Semifinals; March 22
4	Brown	2
1	Minnesota	1
3	Minnesota-Duluth	3
2	Niagara	2

National Championship; March 24
4	Brown	2
3	Minnesota-Duluth	3
