= 2009–10 Boston University Terriers women's ice hockey season =

Hockey East Tournament champions NCAA Regionals, Lost 4-1 vs. Mercyhurst
- Conference: 3 Hockey East
- Home ice: Agganis Arena

Rankings
- USA Today/USA Hockey Magazine: 8
- USCHO.com/CBS College Sports: 8

Record
- Overall: 1-0-2

Coaches and captains
- Head coach: Brian Durocher

The Boston University Terriers women's ice hockey team represented Boston University in the 2009–10 NCAA Division I women's ice hockey season. The Terriers were coached by Brian Durocher. Assisting Durocher were Katie Lachapelle, Allison Coomey and Todd Langlais.

== Offseason ==
- June 15: The Boston University women's ice hockey team will add a group of seven newcomers to its 2009-10 roster. The Terriers will welcome forwards Jill Cardella, Taylor Holze, Shannon Mahoney and Cristina Wiley, defensemen Britt Hergesheimer and Kathryn Miller and goaltender Alissa Fromkin, a talented group from across North America.
- June 24: Defenseman Amanda Shaw, who just completed a four-year career with the Boston University women's ice hockey team, has signed with a professional team in Switzerland and will also skate for Canada's national inline hockey team. Shaw will play for ZSC Lions in Zurich, a club in the Swiss women's professional ice hockey league.
- August 17: Sophomores Jenelle Kohanchuk and Tara Watchorn of the Boston University women's ice hockey team have been named to the 2009-10 Canadian National Women's Under-22 team, Hockey Canada announced this weekend. The squad will participate in a three-game series against the Canadian National Team that will take place from August 17–20 at Father David Bauer Olympic Arena in Calgary.

== Regular season ==
- October 5: The Boston University women’s hockey team was ranked No. 10 in the country. The USCHO.com officials revealed it in their first Top-10 Women’s Hockey Poll of the season. BU accumulated 19 points.
- On October 9, 2009, Boucher scored her first career goal and notched her first career multi-point game, as the Terriers defeated the Robert Morris Colonials by a 4-3 overtime tally.
- November: Jill Cardella led all Hockey East rookies with nine points and six goals in league play. The freshman had a five-game point streak from Nov. 2 to Nov. 14, and had the game-winning goal in a 4-0 shutout of Vermont on Nov. 11, and scored the most goals (6) of any player in the month of November in league action.
- February 17: Melissa Anderson of Boston University is among 45 nominees for the Patty Kazmaier Memorial Award.

=== Standings ===
2009–10 Hockey East Association standings
	Conference								Overall					
	GP	W	L	T	SOW	PTS	GF	GA	GP	W	L	T	GF	GA
Providence	21	11	5	5	3	30	59	44	34	15	10	9	91	76
New Hampshire	21	13	6	2	0	28	65	41	31	19	7	5	98	60
Boston University	21	10	6	5	3	28	54	41	34	14	8	12	93	80
Northeastern	21	9	6	6	4	28	45	34	32	17	8	7	77	47
Connecticut	21	10	5	6	1	27	46	33	34	19	8	7	87	57
Boston College	21	7	10	4	4	22	41	54	34	8	16	10	63	97
Vermont	21	5	15	1	0	11	26	55	33	10	22	1	52	90
Maine	21	3	15	3	1	10	24	58	31	6	20	5	63	85

=== Roster ===
Number	Name	Class	Position	Height
1	Ashley Leichliter	SR	G	5-10
2	Britt Hergesheimer	FR	D	5-8
3	Kasey Boucher	SO	D	5-7
4	Kathryn Miller	FR	D	5-10
6	Carly Warren	SO	D	5-11
7	Lauren Cherewyk	JR	F	5-4
8	Holly Lorms	JR	F	5-7
11	Jonnie Bloemers	SR	F	5-5
12	Cristina Wiley	FR	F	5-2
13	Taylor Holze	FR	F	5-4
14	Shannon Mahoney	FR	F	5-7
16	Sarah Appleton	SR	D	5-8
17	Laurel Koller	SR	F	5-7
18	Jillian Kirchner	JR	F	5-2
19	Jenelle Kohanchuk	SO	F	5-7
20	Melissa Tetreau	SR	F/D	5-4
21	Samantha Pulley	FR	F	5-3
22	Jill Cardella	FR	F	5-6
24	Melissa Anderson	SR	F	5-8
25	Jenn Arms	SR	F	5-6
27	Tara Watchorn	SO	D	5-10
30	Alissa Fromkin	FR	G	5-7
33	Melissa Haber	SR	G	5-7

=== Schedule ===
Date	Opponent	Score	Record
Oct. 2	Ohio State	1-1	0-0-1
Oct. 3	Ohio State	4-4	0-0-2
Oct. 9	Robert Morris	4-3	1-0-2
Oct. 16	Wayne State	4-4	1-0-3
Oct. 17	Wayne State	4-2	2-0-3
Oct. 23	#7 @ St. Lawrence	2-2	2-0-4
Oct. 24	#4 @ Clarkson	2-7	2-1-4
Oct. 31	@ Providence	3-1	3-1-4
Nov. 2	Boston College	1-2	3-2-4
Nov. 6	#3 New Hampshire	3-4	3-3-4
Nov. 7	#3 @ New Hampshire	4-4 (Shootout win)	4-3-4
Nov. 11	Vermont	4-0	5-3-4
Nov. 14	Providence	5-3	6-3-4
Nov. 15	Providence	2-6	6-4-4
Nov. 18	@ Boston College		
Nov. 24	@ Maine	1-1	
Nov. 27	@ Princeton		
Jan. 22	Vermont	1-2	
Jan. 26	Northeastern	2-2	
Feb. 1	Maine	2-0	
Feb. 2	Northeastern (Beanpot)	4-4	
Feb. 6	New Hampshire	5-2	
Feb. 13	Northeastern	2-2	
Feb. 14	Northeastern	2-1	
Feb. 20	Maine	3-1	
Feb. 1	Maine	2-0	

== Player stats ==
= Indicates team leader

=== Skaters ===
Player	Games	Goals	Assists	Points	Points/game	PIM	GWG	PPG	SHG
Melissa Anderson	37	21	18	39	1.0541	82	4	6	2
Lauren Cherewyk	38	12	17	29	0.7632	10	5	2	0
Jill Cardella	38	12	15	27	0.7105	22	1	1	0
Jillian Kirchner	38	9	17	26	0.6842	35	1	5	1
Jenelle Kohanchuk	27	12	9	21	0.7778	16	2	5	0
Tara Watchorn	31	3	14	17	0.5484	43	1	1	0
Holly Lorms	33	7	7	14	0.4242	14	0	0	1
Carly Warren	38	3	11	14	0.3684	28	0	2	0
Laurel Koller	38	6	7	13	0.3421	14	3	1	1
Kasey Boucher	38	5	7	12	0.3158	8	0	2	0
Jonnie Bloemers	38	4	8	12	0.3158	30	0	2	0
Sarah Appleton	38	3	7	10	0.2632	36	0	0	0
Kathryn Miller	38	2	3	5	0.1316	18	0	1	0
Cristina Wiley	38	1	3	4	0.1053	8	0	0	0
Melissa Tetreau	34	1	1	2	0.0588	8	0	0	0
Shannon Mahoney	37	1	1	2	0.0541	14	0	0	0
Britt Hergesheimer	38	1	0	1	0.0263	16	0	0	0
Samantha Pulley	23	0	0	0	0.0000	0	0	0	0
Alissa Fromkin	8	0	0	0	0.0000	0	0	0	0
Jenn Arms	38	0	0	0	0.0000	4	0	0	0
Melissa Haber	32	0	0	0	0.0000	2	0	0	0

=== Goaltenders ===
Player	Games	Wins	Losses	Ties	Goals against	Minutes	GAA	Shutouts	Saves	Save %
Melissa Haber	32	15	8	8	65	1906	2.0458	4	773	.922
Alissa Fromkin	8	2	1	4	19	439	2.5951	0	143	.883

== Postseason ==
- March 8:Sophomore Tara Watchorn scored at 9:52 in overtime as Number 3 seeded BU triumphed over No. 5 seed Connecticut. The game was played at Schneider Arena on the Providence College campus. The Terriers clinched their first ever Hockey East Tournament title and earned a spot in the NCAA Tournament. It was Watchorn’s second goal of the season. The 2010 Hockey East Tournament Championship game was the first ever to go into overtime in the eight-year history of the league.

=== NCAA hockey tournament ===
- March 13: Mercyhurst's Bailey Bram scored two goals as the Lakers beat the Terriers by a score of 4-1.

== Awards and honors ==
- Melissa Anderson, 2010 WHEA Second-Team All-Star
- Melissa Anderson, Frozen Four Skills Competition participant
- Kasey Boucher, Hockey East Honor Roll (Oct. 12, 2009)
- Kasey Boucher, Hockey East Honor Roll (Feb. 15, 2010)
- Kasey Boucher, 2010 WHEA Honorable Mention All-Star
- Kasey Boucher, Hockey East Sportsmanship Award
- Jill Cardella – Boston University, Bauer Rookie of the Month, of the Month, November 2009
- Jill Cardella - Runner up, Hockey East Rookie of the Year
- Jill Cardella, 2010 WHEA All-Rookie Team
- Melissa Haber, Frozen Four Skills Competition participant
- Jillian Kirchner, Hockey Player of the Week (Week of October 5)
- Ashley Leichliter - 2010 Turfer Athletic Award
- Tara Watchorn, 2010 WHEA Second-Team All-Star
- Tara Watchorn, New England Hockey Writers All-Star Team

=== Hockey East All-Tournament Team ===
- Melissa Anderson, F: 2010 Women's Hockey East All-Tournament Team
- Melissa Haber, G: 2010 Women's Hockey East All-Tournament Team
- Melissa Haber, 2010 Women's Hockey East Tournament Most Valuable Player
- Tara Watchorn, D: 2010 Women's Hockey East All-Tournament Team

=== Team awards ===
- Lauren Cherewyk was presented with the Friends of Hockey Unsung Hero Award
- Team Most Valuable Player award was shared between forward Melissa Anderson and goaltender Melissa Haber
- Most Improved Player: Carly Warren.
- Samantha Pulley was given the Caroline Bourdeau Spirit Award.
- Academic Honors Award: Jenn Arms
- Women's Ice Hockey Strength and Conditioning Athlete of the Year: Kasey Boucher

== See also ==
- 2009–10 NCAA Division I women's ice hockey season
