= 2003–04 Mercyhurst Lakers women's ice hockey season =

American college ice hockey team season

The 2003–04 Mercyhurst Lakers women's ice hockey team represented Mercyhurst College in the 2003–04 NCAA Division I women's ice hockey season.

== Regular season ==
- Freshman Stefanie Bourbeau participated in 36 games while accumulating a 20-point year (twelve goals and eight assists). Her 12 goals ranked second on the team, and her four power play goals led the squad. For the season, she registered four multiple-point games and two multiple-goal games, while leading all Lakers freshmen in scoring . tied for second in goals scored with 12.
- Desi Clark started all 36 games and finished the season with 26 wins, 6 losses and 4 ties. The 26 wins are the most in any one season by any Mercyhurst goaltender, male or female. Statistically, Clark had a goals against average of 1.44 GAA (third nationally), with a save percentage of .937 (second nationally) and seven shutouts. In CHA, her 2128:03 minutes played were first. Her goals against average of 1.38 in conference play, was first in the CHA. Her conference save percentage of .923, and conference win percentage (.917) were both first in the CHA.
- Freshman Julia Colizza tied for eighth in College Hockey America in goals and tied for seventh in freshman scoring. She appeared in 36 games and put together an 11-point season (six goals and five assists). In addition, she had three multiple-point games and two multiple-goal games.
- Danielle Lansing appeared in all 36 games. She put together a 16-point season (three goals and thirteen assists). In the plus-minus category, she was first on the team with a plus 23. The eight points that she accumulated on defense led CHA.
- Teresa Marchese appeared in 35 games and was first in team points with 37, first in assists with 25, and tied for second in goals with 12. In conference play, she was fifth in the conference in points and third in assists.
- Freshman Ashley Pendleton played in all 36 games. She registered an 11-point year (four goals and seven assists). Of her four goals, two came on the power play while two were game-winning goals.
- Samantha Shirley played in all 36 games and ranked first on the Lakers in goals with 16, and second in assists with 20. Her 16 goals led the conferenceFor the season, she had ten multiple-point games and two multiple-goal games.

=== Highlights ===
- November 16: In a game versus CHA opponent Wayne State, netminder Desi Clark recorded first-ever assist
- January 24: Ashley Pendleton had the only multiple-point game came of the season. It came against Quinnipiac
- March 7: Jill Nugent scored her only two goals of the season in a game against Niagara.

== Postseason ==
- March 13: In the CHA semifinals, Stephanie Bourbeau scored first career hat trick as the Lakers triumphed 4-0 over Wayne State. Samantha Shirley contributed with three assists. Teresa Marchese had three assists in the CHA semifinal win.
- March 14: Danielle Lansing scored an empty goal as the Lakers defeated the Niagara Purple Eagles.

== Awards and honors ==
- Stephanie Bourbeau, CHA All-Tournament Team
- Desi Clark, CHA All-Academic Team member
- Desi Clark, CHA First Team selection
- Desi Clark led the conference in goals-against average during the regular-season
- Desi Clark, 2004 CHA tournament MVP award.
- Julia Colizza, CHA Rookie of the Week (wee of November 24)
- Jessica Dillabough, 2004 CHA Student-Athlete of the Year.
- Danielle Lansing, CHA First Team
- Danielle Lansing, CHA All-Tournament Team choice
- Teresa Marchese, CHA Offensive Player of the Week (Week of November 17)
- Teresa Marchese, CHA Offensive Player of the Week (Week of November 24)
- Teresa Marchese, CHA First Team selection
- Sara McDonald, CHA All-Academic Team.
- Jill Nugent, College Hockey America Rookie of the Week (week of March 7)
- Ashley Pendleton, named CHA Defensive Player of the Week (week of January 27)
- Ashley Pendleton, CHA All-Rookie Team
- Samantha Shirley, CHA Offensive Player of the Week (week of November 10)
- Samantha Shirley, CHA Offensive Player of the Week (week of December 8)
- Samantha Shirley, CHA Offensive Player of the Week (week of January 13)
- Samantha Shirley, CHA Offensive Player of the Week (week of January 27)
- Samantha Shirley, chosen to CHA First Team
- Samantha Shirley, member of CHA All-Academic Team.
