= 2003–04 Brown Bears women's ice hockey season =

Ice Hockey Season in 2003 to 2004

The 2003-04 Brown Bears women's ice hockey team represented Brown University.

== Regular season ==
- January 16: Jessica Link registered the 100th point of her career
- For the second consecutive season, Jessica Link led the team in scoring. She registered 48 points (28 goals and 20 assists). Her 48 points ranked seventh overall in the ECAC. Link led the squad with seven goals on the power play while accumulating three game-winning goals.

== Player stats ==
=== Skaters ===
Player	Games Played	Goals	Assists	Points	Game Winning Goals
Jessica Link	30	28	20	48	3
Keaton Zucker	31	14	23	37	1
Amy McLaughlin	31	6	19	25	0

=== Goaltenders ===
Player	Games Played	Wins	Losses	Ties	Goals Against	Minutes	Goals Against Average	Shutouts	Saves	Save Percentage

== Awards and honors ==
- Jessica Link, First Team All-Ivy
- Jessica Link, Second Team All-ECAC honors.
