= 2009–10 Providence Friars women's ice hockey season =

Hockey East regular season champions
- Conference: 1 HEA
- Home ice: Schneider Arena

Rankings
- USA Today/USA Hockey Magazine: 10
- USCHO.com/CBS College Sports: Not ranked

Record
- Overall: 15-10-9

Coaches and captains
- Head coach: Bob Deraney

The Friars are coached by Bob Deraney. Assisting Deraney are Bob Bellemore, Meredith Roth, and Amy Quinlan.

== Offseason ==
- July 16: Former Providence College women's hockey player Karen Thatcher is one of 41 players selected to participate in the 2009 USA Hockey Women's National Festival. The Festival will take place August 18–24 in Blaine, Minnesota. The Festival will serve as the selection camp for the 2009-10 U.S. Women's National Team that will compete in the Qwest Tour. The tour is a 10-game domestic tour that begins September 25 and ends just prior to the start of the 2010 Olympic Winter Games.
- July 17: Providence College hockey sophomore Genevieve Lacasse was one of 42 players selected to Canada's National Women's Under-22 Camp. The camp took place on August 6–14 in Calgary, Alberta. The camp will determine the selections for the National Women's Under-22 Team for the 2009-10 season. Lacasse finished her first season as a goaltender at Providence. Lacasse finished with a 15-11-1 record to go along with a 1.94 goals against average and a .933 save percentage.

== Exhibition ==
Date	Opponent	Location	Time
09/26/09	vs. McGill	Providence, R.I.	2:00 p.m. ET

== Regular season ==
- Oct. 2: Freshman Jessica Cohen scored her first-career goal in the 4-0 victory against Maine, and it was also the game-winning goal.
- October: Jessica Cohen finished the month of October with three goals and three assists for six points, the second-highest mark on the team. She recorded two points (1g, 1a) in the first game of her career in Providence's 4-0 victory over Maine on Oct. 2. Of her three goals, two have been game-winners (10/2 vs. Maine, 10/16 vs. Colgate).
- December: Genevieve Lacasse finished the month with a 1-0-1 record based on a 1.44 GAA and a .940 save percentage. Lacasse made 22 saves in a 4-1 victory over No. 3 New Hampshire, handing the Wildcats their first ever conference loss at the Whittemore Center on December 5. Lacasse finished out the month with 25 saves in a 2-2 tie against Boston College on December 11.
- December 5: Genevieve Lacasse of Providence made 22 saves in a 4-1 victory as the Wildcats suffered their first ever conference loss at the Whittemore Center.
- December 18: Former Friar women's hockey star Karen Thatcher was one of 21 players selected to the 2009-10 U.S. Olympic Team.
- January 9: Providence College women's hockey earned their 600th victory by defeating No. 8 Cornell by a score of 6-3. Junior Jean O'Neill tallied a goal and an assist. Genevieve Lacasse made 22 saves to record the victory. Providence now joins New Hampshire as the only two programs with 600 victories.
- January: Jean O’Neill led Providence College to a 7-2-1 record finishing the month with 13 points on seven goals, which included two game-winning goals and six assists. O’Neill registered nine points (4 goals, 5 assists) in four games against ranked teams. This included two goals and an assist in a 3-2 victory at No. 3 New Hampshire on January 16. She tallied an eight-game point streak from Jan. 3 to Jan. 29, which included three multi-point games during the streak.
- January 14: It was announced that the grand opening of the Bill and Emily Leary Friends of Friar Hockey Room was set for Sunday, January 17.
- February 9: Head Coach Bob Deraney announced the signing of five players for the class of 2014. The signees include Corinne Buie (Edina, Minn.), Stephanie Demars (Vermontville, N.Y.), Rebecca Morse (Westfield, N.J.), Maggie Pendleton (Woodbury, Minn.) and Nina Riley (Lexington, Mass.) for the 2010-11 season.

=== Standings ===
2009–10 Hockey East Association standings
	Conference								Overall					
	GP	W	L	T	SOW	PTS	GF	GA	GP	W	L	T	GF	GA
Providence	21	11	5	5	3	30	59	44	34	15	10	9	91	76
New Hampshire	21	13	6	2	0	28	65	41	31	19	7	5	98	60
Boston University	21	10	6	5	3	28	54	41	34	14	8	12	93	80
Northeastern	21	9	6	6	4	28	45	34	32	17	8	7	77	47
Connecticut	21	10	5	6	1	27	46	33	34	19	8	7	87	57
Boston College	21	7	10	4	4	22	41	54	34	8	16	10	63	97
Vermont	21	5	15	1	0	11	26	55	33	10	22	1	52	90
Maine	21	3	15	3	1	10	24	58	31	6	20	5	63	85

=== Roster ===
Number	Name	Height	Weight	Position	Class
15	Kate Bacon	5-6	138	Forward	FR
10	Ashley Cottrell	5-6	140	Forward	SO
8	Lauren Covell	5-7	140	Forward	SO
19	Jackie Duncan	5-8	155	Forward	JR
31	Christina England	5-7	150	Goaltender	SO
22	Jennifer Friedman	5-11	165	Defense	SO
14	Abby Gauthier	5-4	135	Forward	SO
4	Christie Jensen	5-5	130	Defense	SO
27	Genevieve Lacasse	5-9	145	Goaltender	SO
5	Colleen Martin	5-9	155	Defense	JR
12	Pamela McDevitt	5-6	145	Forward	JR
25	Jean O'Neill	5-5	145	Forward	SO
20	Mari Pehkonen	5-7	135	Forward	SR
9	Arianna Rigano	5-6	150	Forward	JR
17	Leigh Riley	5-6	145	Defenseman	SO
21	Alyse Ruff	5-9	155	Forward	SO
24	Breanna Schwarz	5-8	150	Defense	SO
32	Jennifer Smith	5-5	127	Goaltender	SO
2	Laura Veharanta	5-6	135	Forward	SO
13	Amber Yung	5-10	165	Defenseman	SO

=== Schedule ===
Date	Opponent	Location	Time	Score	Record
10/02/09	vs. Maine*	Providence, R.I.	7:00 p.m. ET	4-0	1-0-0
10/03/09	vs. Maine*	Providence, R.I.	4:00 p.m. ET	2-1	2-0-0
10/09/09	at Clarkson	Potsdam, N.Y.	7:00 p.m. ET	Loss, 3-2	2-1-0
10/10/09	at St. Lawrence	Canton, N.Y.	3:00 p.m. ET	Tie, 3-3	2-1-1
10/16/09	vs. Colgate	Providence, R.I.	7:00 p.m. ET	Win, 4-1	3-1-1
10/17/09	vs. Syracuse	Providence, R.I.	4:00 p.m. ET	Loss, 3-1	3-2-1
10/23/09	vs. Yale	Providence, R.I.	7:00 p.m. ET	Tie, 2-2	3-2-2
10/25/09	vs. Brown	Providence, R.I.	2:00 p.m. ET	Loss, 5-1	3-3-2
10/31/09	vs. Boston University*	Providence, R.I.	2:00 p.m. ET	Loss, 3-1	3-4-2
11/01/09	at Connecticut* *	Storrs, Conn.	4:00 p.m. ET	Tie, 1-1	3-4-3
11/06/09	at Maine*	Orono, Maine	7:00 p.m. ET	2-2	3-4-5
11/08/09	vs. Northeastern*	Providence, R.I.	2:00 p.m. ET	1-1	3-4-6
11/14/09	at Boston University*	Boston, Mass.	3:00 p.m. ET	3-5	3-5-6
11/15/09	vs. Boston University*	Providence, R.I.	2:00 p.m. ET	6-2	4-5-6
11/20/09	vs. Northeastern*	Providence, R.I.	7:00 p.m. ET	3-4	4-6-6
11/27/09	vs. Wisconsin	Providence, R.I.	7:00 p.m. ET	2-2	4-6-7
11/28/09	vs. Wisconsin	Providence, R.I.	7:00 p.m. ET	1-4	4-7-7
12/05/09	at New Hampshire*	Durham, N.H.	2:00 p.m. ET	4-1	5-7-7
12/11/09	at Boston College *	Chestnut Hill, Mass.	7:00 p.m. ET	2-2	5-7-8
01/02/10	at Minnesota State-Mankato	St. Cloud, Minn.		4-4	5-7-9
01/03/10	at St. Cloud State	St. Cloud, Minn.		2-0	6-7-9
01/09/10	vs. Cornell	Providence, R.I.	2:00 p.m. ET	6-3	7-7-9
01/10/10	vs. Cornell	Providence, R.I.	2:00 p.m. ET	3-0	8-7-9
01/16/10	at New Hampshire*	Durham, N.H.	2:00 p.m. ET	3-2	9-7-9
01/17/10	vs. New Hampshire*	Providence, R.I.	2:00 p.m. ET	3-2	10-7-9
01/23/10	vs. Boston College*	Providence, R.I.	2:00 p.m. ET	2-1	11-7-9
01/24/10	at Boston College*	Chestnut Hill, Mass.	2:00 p.m. ET	6-3	12-7-9
01/29/10	vs. Vermont*	Providence, R.I.	7:00 p.m. ET	1-2	12-8-9
01/30/10	at Harvard	Cambridge, Mass.	4:00 p.m. ET	1-2	12-9-9
02/06/10	at Northeastern*	Boston, Mass.	2:00 p.m. ET	2-1	13-9-9
02/12/10	vs. Connecticut *	Providence, R.I.	1:00 p.m. ET	3-3	13-9-10
02/13/10	at Connecticut*	Storrs, Conn.	1:00 p.m. ET	1-4	13-10-10
02/19/10	at Vermont*	Burlington, Vt.	7:00 p.m. ET	4-2	14-10-10
02/20/10	at Vermont*	Burlington, Vt.	4:00 p.m. ET	5-2	15-10-10

== Player stats ==
= Indicates team leader

=== Skaters ===
Player	Games	Goals	Assists	Points	Points/game	PIM	GWG	PPG	SHG
Ashley Cottrell	35	14	17	31	0.8857	14	2	4	0
Jean O'Neill	35	14	16	30	0.8571	12	3	5	1
Alyse Ruff	35	12	15	27	0.7714	42	2	6	0
Jessica Cohen	34	6	13	19	0.5588	38	2	0	0
Nicole Anderson	35	11	3	14	0.4000	16	2	6	0
Arianna Rigano	35	7	7	14	0.4000	20	1	1	0
Amber Yung	35	5	9	14	0.4000	12	0	2	0
Jessica Vella	21	5	7	12	0.5714	10	1	0	0
Laura Veharanta	33	3	9	12	0.3636	36	0	1	0
Kate Bacon	28	4	6	10	0.3571	30	0	0	0
Jennifer Friedman	34	3	7	10	0.2941	22	1	2	0
Abby Gauthier	34	4	5	9	0.2647	8	0	0	0
Colleen Martin	35	1	8	9	0.2571	18	0	1	0
Lauren Covell	35	0	9	9	0.2571	20	0	0	0
Christie Jensen	35	2	4	6	0.1714	34	1	1	0
Jackie Duncan	22	1	4	5	0.2273	19	0	0	0
Leigh Riley	35	1	4	5	0.1429	14	0	0	0
Genevieve Lacasse	35	0	2	2	0.0571	0	0	0	0
Pamela McDevitt	31	0	0	0	0.0000	4	0	0	0
Breanna Schwarz	14	0	0	0	0.0000	4	0	0	0
Christina England	1	0	0	0	0.0000	0	0	0	0
Emily Groth	9	0	0	0	0.0000	0	0	0	0

=== Goaltenders ===
Player	Games	Wins	Losses	Ties	Goals against	Minutes	GAA	Shutouts	Saves	Save %
Christina England	1	0	0	0	0	5	0.0000	0	3	1.000
Genevieve Lacasse	35	15	11	9	76	2129	2.1422	3	878	.920

== Awards and honors ==
- Jessica Cohen, Rookie of the Week (Week of October 5)
- Jessica Cohen, Bauer Rookie of the Month, of the Month, October 2009
- Ashley Cottrell, New England Hockey Writers All-Star Team
- Bob Deraney, Hockey East Coach of the Year
- Genevieve Lacasse, Bauer Goaltender of the Month, December 2009
- Genevieve Lacasse, Hockey East Co-Defensive Player of the Week(Week of January 11)
- Jean O’Neill, WHEA Player of the Month, January 2010
- Alyse Ruff, Hockey East Player of the Week (Week of January 25)
- Amber Yung, Runner up, Best Defenseman Award
- Amber Yung, New England Hockey Writers All-Star Team

=== All Hockey East team ===
- Ashley Cottrell, 2010 WHEA First-Team All-Star
- Genevieve Lacasse, 2010 WHEA Second-Team All-Star
- Jean O’Neill, 2010 WHEA Second-Team All-Star
- Alyse Ruff, 2010 WHEA Honorable Mention All-Star
- Amber Yung, Genevieve Lacasse, 2010 WHEA Second-Team All-Star
