= 2009–10 Boston College Eagles women's ice hockey season =

- Conference: 6th HEA
- Home ice: Conte Forum

Rankings
- USA Today/USA Hockey Magazine: Not ranked
- USCHO.com/CBS College Sports: Not ranked

Record
- Overall: 7-10-4
- Home: 0-1-1
- Road: 1-1-3

Coaches and captains
- Head coach: Katie King

The Boston College Eagles hockey team represented Boston College in the 2009–10 NCAA Division I women's ice hockey season. The Eagles are coached by Katie King. King is assisted by Mike Doneghey and Courtney Kennedy.

== Regular season ==
- The Eagles competed in the Beanpot, and the Hockey East Tournament.
- February 17: Allie Thunstrom of Boston College is among 45 nominees for the Patty Kazmaier Memorial Award.
- In the month of February, Kiera Kingston recorded a 2-1-1 record. Her goals against average was 1.46 and she had 138 saves and recorded a save percentage of .952. Against the Boston University Terriers, she accumulated 32 saves on Feb. 9. Four days later, she stopped 36 shots from the Maine Black Bears. Of the seven goals she allowed, two were on the penalty kill.
- March 23: The Eagles hosted its sixth annual sledge hockey game. Their opponent was the Massachusetts Hospital School Chariots at Kelley Rink in Chestnut Hill, Mass.
- Allie Thunstrom was in her final season for Boston College. She never missed a game while competing for Boston College. She appeared in all 141 games in her four years. In her senior season (2009–10), she recorded 22 goals and seven assists. Thunstrom led the Eagles in goals and points and finished the season with the most goals scored in Hockey East.

=== Standings ===
2009–10 Hockey East Association standings
	Conference								Overall					
	GP	W	L	T	SOW	PTS	GF	GA	GP	W	L	T	GF	GA
Providence	21	11	5	5	3	30	59	44	34	15	10	9	91	76
New Hampshire	21	13	6	2	0	28	65	41	31	19	7	5	98	60
Boston University	21	10	6	5	3	28	54	41	34	14	8	12	93	80
Northeastern	21	9	6	6	4	28	45	34	32	17	8	7	77	47
Connecticut	21	10	5	6	1	27	46	33	34	19	8	7	87	57
Boston College	21	7	10	4	4	22	41	54	34	8	16	10	63	97
Vermont	21	5	15	1	0	11	26	55	33	10	22	1	52	90
Maine	21	3	15	3	1	10	24	58	31	6	20	5	63	85

=== Roster ===
Number	Name	Class	Position	Height
2	Becky Zavisza	SR	Forward	5-8
4	Brie Baskin	SR	Forward/Defense	5-6
5	Tracy Johnson	JR	Defense	5-6
6	Kristin Regan	FR	Defense	5-6
8	Allison Szlosek	FR	Forward	5-8
9	Allie Thunstrom	JR	Forward	5-5
10	Maggie Taverna	SR	Defense	5-8
11	Colleen Harris	SR	Forward	5-8
12	Shannon Webster	SR	Defense	5-8
14	Katelyn Kurth	SO	Defense	5-9
16	Kelli Stack	JR	Forward	5-5
17	Danielle Welch	FR	Forward	5-9
18	Meghan Fardelmann	SR	Forward	5-8
21	Andrea Green	FR	Forward	5-7
22	Mary Restuccia	FR	Forward	5-6
23	Megan Shea	FR	Forward	5-5
27	Lauren Wiedmeier	SR	Forward	5-2
28	Stephanie Olchowski	SR	Defense	5-8
30	Molly Schaus	JR	Goaltender	5-9
32	Kiera Kingston	FR	Goaltender	5-6
33	Amanda Rothschild	SO	Goaltender	5-5

=== Schedule ===
Date	Opponent	Score	Record
Oct. 2	@ Clarkson	Loss, 5-1	0-1-0
Oct. 3	@ Clarkson	Tie, 1-1	0-1-1
Oct. 9	Syracuse	Tie, 3-3	0-1-2
Oct. 10	Colgate	Win, 5-3	1-1-2
Oct. 13	Northeastern	Loss, 3-2	1-2-2
Oct. 16	Quinnipiac	1-1	1-2-3
Oct. 18	Maine	1-1	1-2-4
Nov. 2	@ Boston University	2-1	2-2-4
Nov. 6	Vermont	3-0	3-2-4
Nov. 7	Vermont	1-5	3-3-4
Nov. 14	@ Connecticut	0-0	3-3-5
Nov. 15	@ Connecticut	4-0	4-3-5
Nov. 18	Boston University	0-4	4-4-5
Nov. 20	@ Vermont	3-3	4-4-6
Nov. 27	Minnesota Duluth	0-3	4-5-6
Nov. 28	Minnesota Duluth	1-5	4-6-6
Dec. 4	Northeastern	3-2	5-6-6
Dec. 8	New Hampshire	0-4	5-7-6
Dec. 11	Providence	2-2	5-7-7
Jan. 9	Yale	3-3	5-7-8
Jan. 11	@ Northeastern	4-7	5-8-8
Jan. 14	St. Lawrence	3-3	5-8-9
Jan. 15	St. Lawrence	0-4	5-9-9
Jan. 19	@ Boston University	1-3	5-10-9
Jan. 23	@ Providence	1-2	5-11-9
Jan. 24	Providence	3-6	5-12-9
Jan. 27	@ Dartmouth	3-6	5-13-9
Feb. 2	@ Harvard	0-5	5-14-9
Feb. 6	@ Connecticut	1-3	5-15-9
Feb. 9	Boston University	1-1	5-15-10
Feb. 12	@ Maine	3-2	6-15-10
Feb. 13	@ Maine	4-1	7-15-10
Feb. 20	@ New Hampshire	2-1	8-15-10
Feb. 21	New Hampshire	1-4	8-16-10
Feb. 28	Boston University	1-3	8-17-10

== Player stats ==
= Indicates team leader

=== Skaters ===
Player	Games	Goals	Assists	Points	Points/game	PIM	GWG	PPG	SHG
Allie Thunstrom	35	22	7	29	0.8286	16	3	3	0
Ashley Motherwell	35	5	14	19	0.5429	24	1	2	0
Mary Restuccia	32	9	9	18	0.5625	73	0	3	1
Danielle Welch	35	9	5	14	0.4000	37	3	2	0
Blake Bolden	29	4	9	13	0.4483	67	0	2	0
Caitlin Walsh	35	6	6	12	0.3429	44	0	3	0
Kristina Brown	34	5	5	10	0.2941	20	1	0	0
Shannon Webster	35	2	6	8	0.2286	14	0	0	0
Alison Szlosek	35	1	6	7	0.2000	24	0	0	0
Katelyn Kurth	35	0	5	5	0.1429	36	0	0	0
Dru Burns	35	0	4	4	0.1143	18	0	0	0
Laura Hart	35	1	2	3	0.0857	10	0	0	0
Andrea Green	35	0	2	2	0.0571	46	0	0	0
Kristin Regan	35	0	2	2	0.0571	18	0	0	0
Corinne Boyles	24	0	1	1	0.0417	0	0	0	0
Tracy Johnson	35	0	1	1	0.0286 30	0	0	0	
Kiera Kingston	14	0	0	0	0.0000	0	0	0	0
Elizabeth Olchowski	35	0	0	0	0.0000	2	0	0	0

=== Goaltenders ===
Player	Games	Wins	Losses	Ties	Goals against	Minutes	GAA	Shutouts	Saves	Save %
Kiera Kingston	14	3	7	3	32	778	2.4681	2	359	.918
Corinne Boyles	24	5	10	7	66	1367	2.8967	1	644	.907

== Awards and honors ==
- Kiera Kingston, Bauer/Hockey East Goaltender of the Month, February 2010
- Ashley Motherwell, 2010 WHEA All-Rookie Team
- Allie Thunstrom, 2010 WHEA Second-Team All-Star
- Allie Thunstrom, Frozen Four Skills Competition participant
