= 2009–10 Connecticut Huskies women's ice hockey season =

Nutmeg Classic champions
- Conference: 5 HEA
- Home ice: Mark Edward Freitas Ice Forum

Rankings
- USA Today/USA Hockey Magazine: 9
- USCHO.com/CBS College Sports: 9

Record
- Overall: 21-9-7

Coaches and captains
- Head coach: Heather Linstad

The head coach is Heather Linstad. Assisting Linstad are Jaime Totten and Kirsti Anderson. The first time the 2009/10 women's ice hockey team took the ice was at Mark Edward Freitas Ice Forum. It will be in exhibition play against Dawson College on September 25 at 7 p.m. The regular season began on the road at New Hampshire on October 3. UConn's regular season home opener was October 16 against the Syracuse Orange women's ice hockey program at 7 p.m.

== Offseason ==
- June 19: Hockey East announced that Connecticut women's ice hockey assistant coach Jaime Totten will be one of three assistants for the Hockey East All-Star team this season. On November 22, the WHEA All-Stars will take on Team USA at New Hampshire's Whittemore Center. She was an assistant coach for the USA Women's National Under-22 team in 2008 during a three-game series against Canada.
- July 2: Heather Linstad announced the incoming freshman class of six student-athletes set to join the Huskies on their 2009-10 campaign. The incoming players are from four states and two provinces the class includes five skaters and one goalie. The players are:
- Maude Blain (from Magog, Quebec) was an assistant captain on Team Quebec when the squad earned the bronze medal at the 2007 Canada games and served as a team captain when Team Quebec took silver at the 2007 Canadian Champion.
- Claire Frances (from Stowe, Vermont) earned the starting goaltender spot as a freshman at Stowe High School. As a sophomore, she led the ice hockey team to a runner-up finish at the Vermont State Championships. Stowe was a two-time Vermont High School Coaches and Burlington Free Press all-league honouree.
- Kelly Horan (from Methuen, Massachusetts) helped Lawrence Academy to one ISL Championship and the 2007 Harrington Tournament title.
- Casey Knajdek (from Woodbury, Minnesota) was a five-time varsity letterwinner at Hill Murray in women's ice hockey and softball. Knajdek helped her hockey team to three consecutive conference championships while she earned all-conference accolades at the end of each championship season.
- Carli Pridmore (from Winnetka, Illinois) will join former teammates Jaclyn Camardo (Arlington Heights, Ill.) and Nicole Camardo (Arlington Heights, Ill.) as a freshman this season. She played with both Camardos on the Chicago Young Americans U19 squad.
- Elisabeth Stathopulos (from Toronto, Ontario) played for the Durham Junior Lightning Intermediate AA team, helping the team to the 2007 Ontario Provincial Championship Title.

- July 20: Rebecca Hewett is among the 42 players invited to Hockey Canada's National Women's Under-22 Team selection camp held August 7–14 in Calgary, Alberta.
- August 19: Heather Linstad announced the addition of Kirsti Anderson to this season's coaching staff. Anderson spent the last two season as an assistant with Hamilton College’s women's ice hockey program.

== Regular season ==
- January: Alexandra Garcia was between the pipes for every game of the undefeated month of January (9-0-1) for the Huskies. She had a 1.09 GAA and a .951 save-percentage. Garcia capped off the month with back-to-back shutouts at Boston Unoversotu and against Vermont. Garcia finished the month with three shutouts, after denying Robert Morris on Jan. 9. She allowed fewer than two goals in all by one contest in January and made 20 or more saves in six contests.
- February 17: Senior defender Cristin Allen is among 45 nominees for the Patty Kazmaier Memorial Award.
- During the month of February, Elizabeth Stathopulos registered four assists. On February 27, she assisted on the game-winning goal that beat Boston College. During February, she led all Huskies freshmen with five points. She finished her month with a rating of +3.

=== Standings ===
2009–10 Hockey East Association standings
	Conference								Overall					
	GP	W	L	T	SOW	PTS	GF	GA	GP	W	L	T	GF	GA
Providence	21	11	5	5	3	30	59	44	34	15	10	9	91	76
New Hampshire	21	13	6	2	0	28	65	41	31	19	7	5	98	60
Boston University	21	10	6	5	3	28	54	41	34	14	8	12	93	80
Northeastern	21	9	6	6	4	28	45	34	32	17	8	7	77	47
Connecticut	21	10	5	6	1	27	46	33	34	19	8	7	87	57
Boston College	21	7	10	4	4	22	41	54	34	8	16	10	63	97
Vermont	21	5	15	1	0	11	26	55	33	10	22	1	52	90
Maine	21	3	15	3	1	10	24	58	31	6	20	5	63	85

=== Roster ===
Number	Name	Height	Position	Class
2	Jamie Tuttle	5-7	Defense	SO
4	Jody Sydor	5-8	Defense	JR
5	Casey Knajdek	5-4	Forward/Defense	FR
7	Justine Cigna	5-4	Forward	SR
8	Brittany Murphy	5-5	Forward	JR
9	Nicole Camardo	5-5	Defense	SO
10	Amy Hollstein	5-2	Forward	SR
11	Jaclyn Camardo	5-5	Forward	SO
13	Jennifer Chaisson	5-10	Forward	JR
14	Carli Pridmore	5-8	Defense	FR
15	Sami Evelyn	5-7	Defense	SO
17	Jessica Lutz	5-8	Forward	JR
18	Rebecca Hewett	5-6	Defense	SO
19	Elisabeth Stathopulos	5-8	Forward	FR
21	Kelly Horan	5-0	Forward	FR
22	Lauren LeMond	5-6	Forward	JR
25	Cristin Allen	5-4	Defense	SR
26	Monique Weber	5-8	Forward	SO
32	Jennie Bellonio	5-4	Goaltender	SR
33	Christie Houser	5-7	Goaltender	SR
35	Claire Frances	5-8	Goaltender	FR
81	Maude Blain	5-7	Defense	FR
83	Alexandra Garcia	5-5	Goaltender	SO
93	Tiffany Good	5-7	Forward	SR
97	Michelle Binning	5-4	Forward	SR

=== Schedule ===
Date	Opponent	Location	Time	Score	Record
09/25/09	vs. Dawson College #	Storrs, Conn.	7:00 p.m. ET	Win, 6-0	1-0-0
10/03/09	at New Hampshire *	Durham, N.H.	2:00 p.m. ET	Loss, 3-1	1-1-0
10/04/09	at Northeastern *	Boston, Mass.	2:00 p.m. ET	Tie, 1-1 (SO Loss)	1-1-1
10/09/09	at St. Lawrence	Canton, N.Y.	7:00 p.m. ET	Win, 2-0	2-1-1
10/10/09	at Clarkson	Potsdam, N.Y.	3:00 p.m. ET	Loss, 4-0	2-2-1
10/16/09	vs. Syracuse	Storrs, Conn.	7:00 p.m. ET	Win, 3-2	3-2-1
10/17/09	vs. Colgate	Storrs, Conn.	4:00 p.m. ET	Loss, 5-2	3-3-1
10/23/09	at Brown	Providence, R.I.	7:00 p.m. ET	Win, 8-1	4-3-1
10/24/09	vs. Union NY	Storrs, Conn.	7:00 p.m. ET	4-1	5-3-1
10/31/09	at New Hampshire *	Durham, N.H.	5:00 p.m. ET	1-3	5-4-1
11/01/09	vs. Providence *	Storrs, Conn.	4:00 p.m. ET	1-1	5-4-2
11/08/09	at Maine	Orono, Maine 1	2:00 p.m. ET	7-2	6-4-2
11/14/09	vs. Boston College *	Storrs, Conn.	1:00 p.m. ET	0-0	6-4-3
11/15/09	at Boston College *	Chestnut Hill, Mass. 1	2:00 p.m. ET	0-4	6-5-3
11/27/09	vs. Quinnipiac (Nutmeg Classic)	New Haven, Conn.	7:00 p.m. ET	1-0	7-5-3
11/28/09	Championship Game (Nutmeg Classic) vs. Yale	New Haven, Conn.	7:00 p.m. ET	6-1	8-5-3
12/04/09	vs. Boston University *	Storrs, Conn.	7:00 p.m. ET	4-3	9-5-3
12/05/09	at Boston University *	Boston, Mass.	3:00 p.m. ET	1-1	9-5-4
12/08/09	at Harvard	Cambridge, Mass.	7:00 p.m. ET	1-2	9-6-4
01/02/10	vs. Dartmouth	Storrs, Conn.	1:00 p.m. ET	3-2	10-6-4
01/03/10	vs. Dartmouth	Storrs, Conn.	1:00 p.m. ET	3-3	10-6-5
01/08/10	at Robert Morris	Pittsburgh, Pa. (Mellon Arena)	2:00 p.m. ET	4-2	11-6-5
01/09/10	at Robert Morris	Moon Township, Pa.	4:00 p.m. ET	4-0	12-6-5
01/16/10	at Vermont *	Burlington, Vt.	2:00 p.m. ET	5-1	13-6-5
01/17/10	at Vermont *	Burlington, Vt.	2:00 p.m. ET	4-1	14-6-5
01/22/10	vs. Maine	Storrs, Conn.	7:00 p.m. ET	4-1	15-6-5
01/23/10	vs. Maine	Storrs, Conn.	4:00 p.m. ET	2-1	16-6-5
01/29/10	at Boston University *	Boston, Mass.	7:00 p.m. ET	2-0	17-6-5
01/30/10	vs. Vermont *	Storrs, Conn.	2:00 p.m. ET	2-0	18-6-5
02/06/10	vs. Boston College *	Storrs, Conn.	1:00 p.m. ET	3-1	19-6-5
02/07/10	vs. New Hampshire *	Storrs, Conn.	1:00 p.m. ET	1-4	19-7-5
02/12/10	at Providence *	Providence, R.I.	7:00 p.m. ET	3-3	19-7-6
02/13/10	vs. Providence *	Storrs, Conn.	4:00 p.m. ET	4-1	20-7-6
02/20/10	vs. Northeastern *	Storrs, Conn.	1:00 p.m. ET	0-0	20-7-7
02/21/10	at Northeastern *	Boston, Mass.	1:00 p.m. ET	0-2	20-8-7

== Player stats ==
= Indicates team leader

=== Skaters ===
Player	Games	Goals	Assists	Points	Points/game	PIM	GWG	PPG	SHG
Michelle Binning	37	20	10	30	0.8108	36	5	7	1
Monique Weber	37	14	15	29	0.7838	78	3	5	1
Jennifer Chaisson	37	10	15	25	0.6757	16	1	4	1
Cristin Allen	37	3	21	24	0.6486	20	1	2	0
Elisabeth Stathopulous	37	9	14	23	0.6216	10	2	1	0
Kelly Horan	37	6	12	18	0.4865	8	1	0	0
Amy Hollstein	37	8	8	16	0.4324 16	2	0	2	
Brittany Murphy	37	6	10	16	0.4324 30	3	0	0	
Sami Evelyn	37	3	12	15	0.4054 48	1	2	0	
Jessica Lutz	37	3	10	13	0.3514 20	0	0	0	
Jody Sydor	37	2	10	12	0.3243 30	0	2	0	
Rebecca Hewett	37	0	10	10	0.2703 28	0	0	0	
Maude Blain	36	5	4 9	0.2500	8	0	2	1	
Casey Knajdek	37	2	5	7	0.1892 22	1	1	0	
Tiffany Good	32	3	2	5	0.1563	8	1	1	0
Lauren LeMond	37	1	1	2	0.0541	6	0	0	0
Jaclyn Camardo	37	0	0	0	0.0000	0	0	0	0
Jennie Bellonio	5	0	0	0	0.0000	0	0	0	0
Nicole Camardo	23	0	0	0	0.0000	0	0	0	0
Carli Pridmore	20	0	0	0	0.0000	0	0	0	0
Alexandra Garcia	33	0	0	0	0.0000	0	0	0	0

=== Goaltenders ===
Player	Games	Wins	Losses	Ties	Goals against	Minutes	GAA	Shutouts	Saves	Save %
Jennie Bellonio	5	3	1	0	7	264	1.5929	0	88	.926
Alexandra Garcia	33	18	8	7	53	1993	1.5954	6	718	.931

== Postseason ==
- March 7: Connecticut moves to the Hockey East Tournament championship game. The Huskies had a three-goal first period and did not look back. The Huskies eliminated the top-seeded Providence Friars at Schneider Arena. Alexandra Garcia stopped 32 shots. The Huskies are in the Hockey East championship game for the second time in conference history. This is the Huskies first appearance in the championship since 2005.

- March 8:Sophomore Tara Watchorn scored at 9:52 in overtime as Number 3 seeded BU defeated No. 5 seed Connecticut. The game was played at Schneider Arena on the Providence College campus. The Terriers clinched their first ever Hockey East Tournament title and earned a spot in the NCAA Tournament. The 2010 Hockey East Tournament Championship game was the first ever to go into overtime in the eight-year history of the league. Connecticut did not receive an at-large berth.

== Awards and honors ==
- Cristin Allen, Best Defenseman Award
- Cristin Allen, Runner up, Hockey East Player of the Year
- Cristin Allen, New England Hockey Writers All-Star Team
- Jennifer Chaisson - Hockey East Best Defensive Forward
- Alexandra Garcia – Connecticut, Bauer Goaltender of the Month, January 2010
- Alexandra Garcia, Runner Up, Hockey East Goaltending Champion

=== All Hockey East Team ===
- Cristin Allen, 2010 WHEA First-Team All-Star
- Alexandra Garcia, 2010 WHEA Honorable Mention All-Star
- Jody Sydor, 2010 WHEA Honorable Mention All-Star
- Monique Weber, 2010 WHEA Honorable Mention All-Star

=== Hockey East All Tournament team ===
- Cristin Allen, D: 2010 Women's Hockey East All-Tournament Team
- Michelle Binning, F: 2010 Women's Hockey East All-Tournament Team
- Amy Hollstein, F: 2010 Women's Hockey East All-Tournament Team

== See also ==
- 2009–10 Connecticut Huskies women's basketball team
