= 2009–10 New Hampshire Wildcats women's ice hockey season =

- Conference: Hockey East

Rankings
- USA Today/USA Hockey Magazine: 6
- USCHO.com/CBS College Sports: 7

Record
- Overall: 2-0-0

Coaches and captains
- Head coach: Brian McCloskey

The head coach was Brian McCloskey. Assisting him were Erin Whitten and Stephanie Jones.

== Offseason ==
- June 19: Hockey East, in conjunction with USA Hockey and the University of New Hampshire, announced that it will hold a Nov. 22 exhibition game featuring WHEA All-Stars vs. the U.S. Women's National Team at UNH's Whittemore Center as part of Team USA's Qwest Tour in preparation for the 2010 Olympic Winter Games.
- July 9: Former New Hampshire skaters Kacey Bellamy and Sam Faber, are among 41 players named to the 2009 USA Hockey Women's National Festival roster. The Festival will be held Aug. 18–24 in Blaine, Minnesota. Twenty-one players from that squad will comprise the team that plays in the 2010 Olympic Winter Games.
- July 28: Four former University of New Hampshire skaters: Karyn Bye, Colleen Coyne, Tricia Dunn and Sue Merz will be enshrined into the United States Hockey Hall of Fame as members of the 1998 U.S. Olympic Women's Ice Hockey Team.
- August 20:The University of New Hampshire will face off against longtime nemesis Northeastern University at Fenway Park on January 8, 2010. It will be part of a Hockey East doubleheader and shall be the first outdoor game in women's college hockey.
- August 24:Kacey Bellamy, captain of the 2009 University of New Hampshire women's ice hockey team, was one of 23 players selected to the 2009-10 U.S. Women's National Team.

== Exhibition ==
Date	Opponent	Time	Score	Record
Sep. 26	N. American Hockey Academy	5:00 PM		

== Regular season ==
=== October ===
- October 5: The New Hampshire Wildcats women's hockey team was ranked No. 3 in the country. The USCHO.com officials revealed it in their first Top-10 Women's Hockey Poll of the season. New Hampshire accumulated 115 points.
- Kelly Paton recorded a point in all nine Wildcats games in the month of October to finish with 15 points (4 goals, 11 assists), including one game-winning goal. In two Hockey East league games, Paton tallied one goal and three assists for four points. Paton matched her career high of three assists on October 18 vs. Niagara. She factored in 15 of the team's 35 goals (43%) for the month, and in three games she had a hand in all of the team's goals. Paton's other numbers included a seven-game assist streak, four multiple-point games and 2-1-3 in two games vs. nationally ranked teams.

=== November ===
- In six November games, Paton recorded seven goals and six assists for 13 points. In four league games, she tallied nine points (4 goals, 5 assists). Paton recorded her second career hat trick and also matched her personal best of four points vs. Rensselaer. She factored directly into 65% of the team's goals with 13 points (20 goals). Paton won back-to-back Player of the Week awards (Nov. 23 & 30).

=== December ===
- December 5: Genevieve Lacasse of Providence made 22 saves in a 4–1 victory as the Wildcats suffered their first ever conference loss at the Whittemore Center.
- December: Jenna Ouellette played in four games and accumulated nine points (5 goals, 4 assists) leading the Black Bears to three victories. She recorded a point in all four games and notched multiple points in three games. She played a part in nine of the 12 Black Bear goals in December and assisted on all four goals vs. Vermont on Dec. 4. She scored the game-winning goal while on the power play in a 1–0 win over Vermont (12/5). In addition, she notched a pair of goals against Union (12/11) and another pair in the finale at Union (12/12).
- December: Kristina Lavoie recorded two goals and two assists for a total of four points in three December games. She netted a goal at Boston College to help lift New Hampshire to a 4–0 victory. She matched her career highs in both assists (two) and points (three) at Dartmouth for a 4–1 win.

=== January ===
- On Friday, January 8, New Hampshire will compete in an outdoor college hockey doubleheader at Boston's Fenway Park. At 4 p.m., Northeastern will face New Hampshire in what is believed to be the first outdoor women's hockey game in the sport's history. At 7:30 p.m., the Boston College men's team plays the Boston University men's teams.
- January: Kristina Lavoie scored a goal in all six January games and finished with totals of seven goals and one assist for eight points. She led UNH in goals and tied for the lead in points. Two of her goals gave the Wildcats a 1–0 lead. In four games vs. nationally ranked teams, she accumulated six points (5 goals, 1 assists). On. Jan. 8 vs. Northeastern, Lavoie broke a 3–3 tie with 5:30 remaining in the game and secured the victory on an empty-net goal with 15 seconds to play. She was also a two-time Rookie of the Week in January (Jan. 11 and Feb. 1).

=== Outdoor game ===
- January 8: The Huskies fell to New Hampshire by a score of 5–3 in the opening game of the Sun Life Frozen Fenway doubleheader, the first-ever outdoor women's college hockey game. The Huskies held a 3–1 lead into the third period, but a four-goal rally by the Wildcats earned them the win. Freshman Brittany Esposito scored two goals and senior Annie Hogan added two assists.

=== February ===
- February 17: Courtney Birchard, Micaela Long and Kelly Paton are among 45 nominees for the Patty Kazmaier Memorial Award.
- Kelly Paton accumulated five goals and nine assists. In every game during the month, she scored at least one point. In three of the games, she had multiple-point games. For the month, she had a +4 rating. In the last game of the regular season, she scored the game winner versus Boston College. The goal gave the Wildcats the second seed in the Hockey East tournament. In the Boston College game, she matched career highs with three assists and four points in the game.

== Standings ==
2009–10 Hockey East Association standings
	Conference								Overall					
	GP	W	L	T	SOW	PTS	GF	GA	GP	W	L	T	GF	GA
Providence	21	11	5	5	3	30	59	44	34	15	10	9	91	76
New Hampshire	21	13	6	2	0	28	65	41	31	19	7	5	98	60
Boston University	21	10	6	5	3	28	54	41	34	14	8	12	93	80
Northeastern	21	9	6	6	4	28	45	34	32	17	8	7	77	47
Connecticut	21	10	5	6	1	27	46	33	34	19	8	7	87	57
Boston College	21	7	10	4	4	22	41	54	34	8	16	10	63	97
Vermont	21	5	15	1	0	11	26	55	33	10	22	1	52	90
Maine	21	3	15	3	1	10	24	58	31	6	20	5	63	85

== Roster ==
Number	Name	Class	Position	Height	Shoots
2	Julie Allen	So.	F	5-10	R
3	Courtney Sheary	So.	D	5-4	R
4	Kelly Cahill	Jr.	D/F	5-3	R
7	Kelly Paton	Jr.	F	5-1	L
8	Shannon Sisk	Jr.	F	5-9	R
9	Jenn Wakefield	So.	F	5-9	R
10	Brittany Skudder	Fr.	F	5-5	L
14	Sarah Cuthbert	Fr.	F/D	5-10	L
15	Raylen Dziengelewski	So.	D	5-7	L
16	Micaela Long	Jr.	F	5-4	L
20	Maggie Joyce	Sr.	D	5-11	L
22	Kacey Bellamy	Sr.	D	5-7	L
23	Angela Taylor	Sr.	F	5-11	L
24	Courtney Birchard	So.	D/F	5-9	L
28	Sam Faber	Sr.	F	5-4	R
31	Kayley Herman	So.	G	5-4	L
36	Lindsey Minton	Fr.	G	5-5	L

== Schedule ==
Date	Opponent	Time	Score	Record
Oct. 3	Connecticut *	2:00 PM	Win, 3-1	1-0-0
Oct. 4	Quinnipiac	2:00 PM	Win, 4-0	2-0-0
Oct. 9	Colgate	7:00 PM	Win, 4-0	3-0-0
Oct. 10	Syracuse	5:00 PM	Win, 2-1	4-0-0
Oct. 17	Niagara	2:00 PM	3-3	4-0-1
Oct. 18	Niagara	2:00 PM	6-1	5-0-1
Oct. 23	at Clarkson	7:00 PM	2-6	5-1-1
Oct. 24	at St. Lawrence	3:00 PM	3-3	5-1-2
Oct. 31	Connecticut	5:00 PM	3-1	6-1-2
Nov. 1	Maine	3:00 PM	5-0	7-1-2
Nov. 6	at Boston U. *	7:00 PM	4-3	8-1-2
Nov. 7	Boston U. *	7:00 PM	4-4	8-1-3
Nov. 18	at Harvard	7:00 PM	1-1	8-1-4
Nov. 21	Rensselaer	5:00 PM	4-3	9-1-4
Nov. 29	at Northeastern *	2:00 PM	2-1	10-1-4
Dec. 5	Providence *	2:00 PM	1-4	10-2-4
Dec. 8	at Boston College *	7:00 PM	4-0	11-2-4
Dec. 12	at Dartmouth	7:00 PM	4-1	12-2-4
Jan. 8	at Northeastern *	5:00 PM	5-3	13-2-4
Jan. 16	Providence *	2:00 PM	2-3	13-3-4
Jan. 17	at Providence *	2:00 PM	2-3	13-4-4
Jan. 20	Northeastern *	7:00 PM	2-2	13-4-5
Jan. 29	at Maine *	7:00 PM	5-2	14-4-5
Jan. 30	at Maine *	2:00 PM	3-1	15-4-5
Feb. 6	Boston U. *	2:00 PM	2-5	15-5-5
Feb. 7	at Connecticut *	1:00 PM	4-1	16-5-5
Feb. 13	Vermont *	2:00 PM	4-2	17-5-5
Feb. 14	Vermont *	2:00 PM	4-0	18-5-5
Feb. 20	Boston College *	2:00 PM	2-1	19-5-5
Feb. 21	at Boston College *	2:00 PM	4-1	20-5-5

== Player stats ==
= Indicates team leader

=== Skaters ===
Player	Games	Goals	Assists	Points	Points/game	PIM	GWG	PPG	SHG
Kelly Paton	33	19	32	51	1.5455	10	4	6	1
Micaela Long	33	13	38	51	1.5455	12	2	6	1
Kristina Lavoie	33	18	11	29	0.8788	24	1	7	0
Courtney Birchard	27	9	13	22	0.8148	34	4	6	1
Kristine Horn	33	8	13	21	0.6364	10	2	5	0
Julie Allen	33	10	3	13	0.3939	26	1	1	0
Kelly Cahill	32	8	5	13	0.4063	27	2	4	0
Brittany Skudder	28	5	8	13	0.4643	24	1	2	0
Raylen Dziengelewski	33	0	13	13	0.3939	22	0	0	0
Courtney Sheary	33	1	7	8	0.2424	24	0	1	0
Sarah Cuthbert	32	3	4	7	0.2188	14	1	0	0
Shannon Sisk	33	2	2	4	0.1212	22	1	0	0
Kailey Chappell	33	1	3	4	0.1212	24	0	0	0
Katie Brock	25	0	4	4	0.1600	12	0	0	0
Bryanna Farris	30	1	2	3	0.1000	16	0	0	0
Molly Morrison	32	0	3	3	0.0938	6	0	0	0
Paige Goloubef	32	1	1	2	0.0625	14	0	0	0
Kayley Herman	16	0	1	1	0.0625	0	0	0	0
Katie Kleinendorst	29	0	0	0	0.0000	2	0	0	0
Lindsey Minton	19	0	0	0	0.0000	0	0	0	0
Emma Clark	29	0	0	0	0.0000	0	0	0	0

=== Goaltenders ===
Player	Games	Wins	Losses	Ties	Goals against	Minutes	GAA	Shutouts	Saves	Save %
Kayley Herman	16	8	4	3	29	926	1.8784	3	306	.913
Lindsey Minton	19	11	5	2	34	1067	1.9124	2	337	.908

== Postseason ==
=== Hockey East tournament ===
Date	Opponent	Score
March 6	Boston University	Loss, 4-0

=== NCAA regionals ===
Date	Opponent	Score
March 13	Minnesota Duluth	Loss, 2-1

=== NCAA tournament ===
- March 13: The Minnesota Duluth Bulldogs women's ice hockey program earned their fourth consecutive trip to the Frozen Four by defeating the Wildcats by a score of 2–1.

== Awards and honors ==
- Courtney Birchard, 2010 WHEA First-Team All-Star
- Courtney Birchard, New England Hockey Writers All-Star Team
- Kristina Lavoie – New Hampshire, Bauer Rookie of the Month, of the Month, December 2009
- Kristina Lavoie – New Hampshire, Bauer Rookie of the Month, of the Month, January 2010
- Kristina Lavoie, Hockey East Rookie of the Year
- Kristina Lavoie, 2010 WHEA Honorable Mention All-Star
- Kristina Lavoie, 2010 WHEA All-Rookie Team
- Micaela Long, Hockey East Scoring Champion
- Micaela Long, 2010 WHEA First-Team All-Star
- Micaela Long, New England Hockey Writers All-Star Team
- Kelly Paton – New Hampshire, WHEA Player of the Month, October 2009
- Kelly Paton – New Hampshire, WHEA Player of the Month, November 2009
- Kelly Paton – New Hampshire, WHEA Player of the Month, February 2010
- Kelly Paton - Hockey East Co-Player of the Year
- Kelly Paton, Runner Up, Hockey East Scoring Champion
- Kelly Paton, 2010 WHEA First-Team All-Star
- Kelly Paton, Frozen Four Skills Competition participant
- Kelly Paton, New England Hockey Writers All-Star Team
- Kelly Paton, New England Hockey Writers Player of the Year

=== All-America selections ===
- Kelly Paton, 2010 Women's RBK Hockey Division I All-America First Team
- Courtney Birchard, 2010 Women's RBK Hockey Division I All-America Second Team
