= 2003–04 Harvard Crimson women's ice hockey season =

NCAA Frozen Four, Runner-up
- Conference: ECAC
- Home ice: Bright Hockey Center

Record

Coaches and captains
- Head coach: Katey Stone

The 2003–04 Harvard Crimson women's ice hockey team played in the NCAA championship game. The Crimson had 30 wins, compared to 4 losses and 1 tie for its second straight 30-win season. Nicole Corriero tied former Crimson player Jennifer Botterill’s record for most points in one NCAA game with ten. She accomplished the feat on November 7, 2003 versus the Union Dutchwomen.

== Player stats ==
Note: GP= Games played; G= Goals; A= Assists; PTS = Points; GW = Game Winning Goals; PPL = Power Play Goals; SHG = Short Handed Goals

Player	GP	G	A	Pts	GW	PPL	SHG
Nicole Corriero	35	42	31	73	10	13	3
Julie Chu	32	15	41	56	3	5	0
Angela Ruggiero	32	25	30	55	5	5	1
Lauren McAuliffe	35	17	21	38	6	8	0
Jennifer Raimondi	35	14	13	27	1	2	0
Ashley Banfield	33	3	21	24	0	2	1
Katie Johnston	33	10	11	21	3	2	0
Jennifer Sifers	35	7	10	17	0	1	0
Caitlin Cahow	34	2	11	13	0	0	0
Jennifer Skinner	33	2	9	11	0	0	0
Katherine Sweet	35	7	3	10	1	2	0
Liza Solley	35	2	6	8	1	0	0
Lindsay Weaver	31	1	7	8	0	0	0
Carrie Schroyer	35	1	6	7	0	0	0
Jaclyn Pitushka	15	0	4	4	0	0	0
Ali Crum	32	2	1	3	0	0	0
Mina Pell	32	1	1	2	0	0	0
Sarah Holbrook	31	0	1	1	0	0	0
Ali Boe	27	0	0	0	0	0	0
Emily Vitt	9	0	0	0	0	0	0
Emily Haigh	32	0	0	0	0	0	0

== Awards and honors ==
- Ali Boe, NCAA leader, 2003-04 season (tied), Goalie winning percentage, .833
- Lindsay Charlebois, 2004 Sarah Devens Award
- Nicole Corriero, NCAA leader, 2003-04 season, Goals per game, 1.20
- Angela Ruggiero, Patty Kazmaier Award
- Angela Ruggiero, 2004 ECAC Tournament Most Valuable Player,
