= Pam Dreyer =

American ice hockey player

- Born: August 9, 1981 (age 45)
- ECAC team: Brown Bears
- National team: United States
Medal record
Women's ice hockey
Representing United States
Olympic Games
Bronze medal – third place	2006 Turin	Tournament
IIHF World Women's Championships
Silver medal – second place	2004 Canada	Tournament

Pamela Kristine Dreyer (born August 9, 1981) is a retired American ice hockey goaltender.

Dreyer is from Eagle River, in Anchorage, Alaska. She attended Chugiak High School, where she played on the hockey team. She also played for the Anchorage Hockey association North Stars.

== International ==
Year	Team	Event	Result	GP	W	L	T/OT	MIN	GA	SO	GAA	SV%
2006	USA	OG	3rd place, bronze medalist(s)	1	1	0	0	60:00	0	1	0.00	1.000

== Awards and honors ==
- 2002 ECAC Tournament Most Valuable Player
