= 2009–10 Brown Bears women's ice hockey season =

- Conference: 10 ECAC
- Home ice: Meehan Auditorium

Rankings
- USA Today/USA Hockey Magazine: Not ranked
- USCHO.com/CBS College Sports: Not ranked

Record
- Overall: 3-21-4

Coaches and captains
- Head coach: Digit Murphy
- Assistant coaches: Sean Coady; Edith Zimmering

The head coach is Digit Murphy. Murphy is assisted by Sean Coady and Edith Zimmering.

== Offseason ==
- May 22, 2009: Former Brown Bears hockey player, Jodi McKenna, now the women's ice hockey head coach at Wesleyan University, was announced as an assistant coach for the 2010 U.S. Olympic Women's Ice Hockey Team. She joins Mark Johnson, women's ice hockey head coach at the University of Wisconsin, who was previously named the head coach for Team USA through the 2010 Olympic Winter Games in Vancouver.
- October 9: The Bears will host the Rhode Island Women's Collegiate Hockey day on October 12 at Meehan Auditorium. The event is a collaboration between the coaches of four collegiate programs. The four programs will be Brown, Providence College, Univ. of Rhode Island, and Salve Regina University. The coaches will provide local athletes a chance to hone their skills and meet with coaching staffs of successful Rhode Island teams.

== Exhibition ==
Date	Opponent	Score	Time	Record
Oct. 16	Toronto	4-5	7:00 PM EDT	0-1-0

== Regular season ==
- Oct 24: Digit Murphy recently announced the addition of Jill McInnis to the 2009-2010 women's hockey coaching staff. McInnis, is a 2006 graduate of Boston College, comes from Saint Anselm College, where she was an assistant coach last season.
- Feb 26: Former Brown player Becky Kellar was part of the gold medal winning Canadian women's Olympic hockey team. Kellar was the oldest player in the gold medal game.

=== Standings ===
2009–10 Eastern College Athletic Conference standings
	Conference							Overall					
	GP	W	L	T	PTS	GF	GA	GP	W	L	T	GF	GA
Cornell	22	14	2	6	34	67	26	36	21	9	6	103	63
Clarkson	22	14	5	3	31	47	28	40	23	12	5	104	69
Harvard	22	13	6	3	29	69	40	33	20	8	5	94	54
Quinnipiac	22	11	4	7	29	44	28	37	19	10	8	79	51
Rensselaer	22	11	7	4	26	56	42	37	16	15	6	87	77
Princeton	22	11	7	4	26	52	42	31	13	14	4	72	70
St. Lawrence	22	11	8	3	25	50	41	37	16	14	7	88	85
Colgate	22	8	10	4	20	51	68	36	12	20	4	86	129
Dartmouth	22	9	12	1	19	70	60	28	12	14	2	90	78
Yale	22	8	13	1	17	36	55	29	10	16	3	56	75
Brown	22	1	18	3	5	22	73	28	3	21	4	41	95
Union	22	1	20	1	3	14	75	34	5	28	1	36	110

= Qualified for NCAA Frozen Four	= Qualified for NCAA Tournament

=== Roster ===
Number	Name	Position	Class	Height
24	Amanda Asay	F/D	Senior	5-10
3	Julianne Bishop	F	Sophomore	5-4
18	Nicole Brown	F	Senior	5-11
21	Jenny Cedorchuk	D	Senior	5-7
11	Erin Connors	F	Senior	5-9
15	Leah Crabtree	F	Sophomore	5-5
14	Jenna Dancewicz	F	Junior	5-8
27	Andrea Hunter	F	Senior	5-5
30	Joy Joung	G	Junior	5-3
4	Erica Kromm	D	Junior	5-8
13	Katelyn Landry	F	Sophomore	5-4
31	Donelle Latimer	G	Sophomore	5-5
23	Vika Mykolenko	F	Sophomore	5-9
26	Jacquie Pierri	D	Sophomore	5-4
2	Paige Pyett	D	Sophomore	5-7
12	Skyelar Siwak	D	Sophomore	5-8
6	Jaclyn Small	D	Junior	5-6
29	Samantha Stortini	D	Junior	5-8
16	Maggie Suprey	F	Junior	5-6
5	Kathleen Surbey	D	Senior	5-5
22	Sasha Van Muyen	F	Senior	5-9
19	Macie Winship	D	Junior	5-6
10	Alison Wong	F	Sophomore	5-2

=== Schedule ===
Date	Opponent	Score	Time	Record
Oct. 23	Connecticut	1-8	7:00 PM EDT	0-1-0
Oct. 25	at Providence	5-1	2:00 PM EDT	1-1-0
Oct. 30	at Clarkson *	0-1	4:00 PM EDT	1-2-0
Oct. 31	at St. Lawrence *	1-3	3:00 PM EDT	1-3-0
Nov. 6	Quinnipiac *	0-0	7:00 PM EST	1-3-1
Nov. 7	Princeton *	0-5	4:00 PM EST	1-4-1
Nov. 13	at Union *	0-0	7:00 PM EST	1-4-2
Nov. 14	at Rensselaer *	1-1	4:00 PM EST	1-4-3
Nov. 20	Dartmouth *	2-5	7:00 PM EST	1-5-3
Nov. 21	Harvard *	1-5	4:00 PM EST	1-6-3
Nov. 27	St. Cloud St.	4-5	7:00 PM EST	1-7-3
Nov. 28	St. Cloud St.	2-3	1:00 PM EST	1-8-3
Dec. 4	at Colgate *	2-4	7:00 PM EST	1-9-3
Dec. 5	at Cornell *	0-5	4:00 PM EST	1-10-3
Jan. 2	at Northeastern		2:00 PM EST	
Jan. 3	Vermont	1-0	3:00 PM EST	
Jan. 9	Boston U.		4:00 PM EST	
Jan. 15	Rensselaer *		7:00 PM EST	
Jan. 16	Union *		4:00 PM EST	0-3
Jan. 22	St. Lawrence *		7:00 PM EST	
Jan. 23	Clarkson *		4:00 PM EST	
Jan. 30	at Yale *		2:00 PM EST	
Jan. 31	Yale *		2:00 PM EST	
Feb. 5	at Harvard *		7:00 PM EST	
Feb. 6	at Dartmouth *		4:00 PM EST	
Feb. 12	Cornell *		7:00 PM EST	
Feb. 13	Colgate *		4:00 PM EST	
Feb. 19	at Princeton *		7:00 PM EST	
Feb. 20	at Quinnipiac *		4:00 PM EST	

== Awards and honors ==
- Katie Jamieson, ECAC Defensive Player of the Week (Week of November 16)
- Katie Jamieson, 2010 Second Team All-Ivy
- Laurie Jolin, ECAC Rookie of the Week (Week of February 22)
