= 2009–10 RPI Engineers women's ice hockey season =

2009–10 Rensselaer Engineers women's ice hockey season
- Conference: ECAC
- Home ice: Houston Field House

Rankings
- USA Today/USA Hockey Magazine: Not ranked
- USCHO.com/CBS College Sports: Not ranked

Record
- Overall: 1-0-1

Coaches and captains
- Head coach: John Burke
- Assistant coaches: Colette Bredin-Youlen; Rob Dils

The Rensselaer Engineers represent Rensselaer Polytechnic Institute. The Engineers were playing their fourth season in ECAC Hockey. The Engineers were coached by John Burke, and he is the Engineers all-time winningest coach (118-82-21). He was in his seventh season as head coach. His assistant coaches were Colette Bredin-Youlen and Rob Dils. Kevin Anderson was the Hockey Operations Coordinator. The Engineers played their home games in the Houston Field House. They were a member of the Eastern College Athletic Conference. During the season, the team won 16 games. It was the second highest mark in school history since joining Division 1. The record is still 19 wins, which was set in 2008-09 (19-14-4). Rensselaer is 16-14-6 overall and finished with an 11-7-4 mark in ECAC Hockey. The Engineers ranked 11th nationally in scoring defense (2.00 goals allowed per game).

== Offseason ==
- May 12: Rensselaer Polytechnic Institute (RPI) head announced that seven student-athletes will make up the program's Class of 2013. Joining the team this fall are:

Name	Position	Height	Former team
Kristen Burney	Goaltender	5-10	Northwest Selects
Janessa Haller	Defense	5-4	Anoka
Taylor Horton	Forward	5-9	Bluewater Hawks
Andrea Le Donne	Defense	5-11	Durham Lightning
Clare Padmore	Forward	5-8	Toronto Jr. Aeros
Shannon Ramelot	Goaltender	5-11	Honeybaked
Audrey Stapleton	Forward	5-6	Chicago Young Americans

== Exhibition ==
Date	Opponent	Location	Time	Score
9/26/2009	Bluewater Hawks	Houston Field House	4pm	

== Regular season ==
- February 17: Laura Gersten and Sonja van der Bliek are among 45 nominees for the Patty Kazmaier Memorial Award.

=== Standings ===
2009–10 Eastern College Athletic Conference standings
	Conference							Overall					
	GP	W	L	T	PTS	GF	GA	GP	W	L	T	GF	GA
Cornell	22	14	2	6	34	67	26	36	21	9	6	103	63
Clarkson	22	14	5	3	31	47	28	40	23	12	5	104	69
Harvard	22	13	6	3	29	69	40	33	20	8	5	94	54
Quinnipiac	22	11	4	7	29	44	28	37	19	10	8	79	51
Rensselaer	22	11	7	4	26	56	42	37	16	15	6	87	77
Princeton	22	11	7	4	26	52	42	31	13	14	4	72	70
St. Lawrence	22	11	8	3	25	50	41	37	16	14	7	88	85
Colgate	22	8	10	4	20	51	68	36	12	20	4	86	129
Dartmouth	22	9	12	1	19	70	60	28	12	14	2	90	78
Yale	22	8	13	1	17	36	55	29	10	16	3	56	75
Brown	22	1	18	3	5	22	73	28	3	21	4	41	95
Union	22	1	20	1	3	14	75	34	5	28	1	36	110

= Qualified for NCAA Frozen Four	= Qualified for NCAA Tournament

=== Roster ===
Number	Name	Position	Height	Shoots	Class
1	Shannon Ramelot	G	5-11		Fr.
2	Audrey Stapleton	F	5-6		Fr.
5	Katie Daniels	D	5-3	R	So.
6	Laura Gersten	D	5-4	R	Sr.
7	Amanda Castignetti	D	5-4	L	So.
8	Allysen Weidner	F	5-7	R	Sr.
10	Whitney Naslund	F	5-5	R	Sr.
12	Laura Guillemette	F	5-3	L	So.
13	Janessa Haller	D	5-4		Fr.
15	Taylor Horton	F	5-9		Fr.
16	Sierra Vadner	D	5-6	R	So.
17	Clare Padmore	F	5-8		Fr.
18	Jill Vandegrift	F	5-5	R	So.
19	Rossli Chace	F	5-7	L	Sr.
20	Alisa Harrison	F	5-5	R	So.
21	Andie Le Donne	D	5-11		Fr.
23	Ashley Gaylord	F	5-7	R	Jr.
24	Sydney O'Keefe	F	5-8	R	Jr.
26	Kristen Jakubowski	F/D	5-11	R	So.
27	Kendra Dunlop	F	5-4	L	Jr.
29	Kristen Burney	G	5-10		Fr.
33	Sonja van der Bliek	G	5-8	L	Jr.
86	Allison Wright	F	5-6	L	Sr.

=== Schedule ===
Date	Opponent	Location	Time	Score	Record
10/2/2009	Wayne State University	Houston Field House	7pm	2-3	1-0-0
10/3/2009	Wayne State University	Houston Field House	3pm	0-0	1-0-1
10/9/2009	Niagara University	Niagara Falls, NY	2pm	Win, 2-0	2-0-1
10/10/2009	Niagara University	Niagara Falls, NY	2pm		
10/16/2009	Mercyhurst College	Houston Field House	7pm	Loss, 1-0	
10/17/2009	Mercyhurst College	Houston Field House	3pm	Loss, 5-1	
10/23/2009	Syracuse University	Houston Field House	2:30pm		
10/24/2009	Syracuse University	Houston Field House	2pm		
10/30/2009	Princeton University	Princeton, NJ	7pm		
10/31/2009	Quinnipiac University	Hamden, CT	4pm		
11/6/2009	Colgate University	Houston Field House	2:30pm		
11/7/2009	Cornell University	Houston Field House	2:30pm		
11/13/2009	Yale University	Houston Field House	7pm		
11/14/2009	Brown University	Houston Field House	4pm		
11/21/2009	University of New Hampshire	Durham, NH	5pm	3-4	
11/27/2009	Robert Morris University	Moon Township, PA	2pm		
11/28/2009	Robert Morris University	Moon Township, PA	2pm		
12/5/2009	Union College	Schenectady, NY	2pm	2-0	
12/6/2009	Union College	Houston Field House	12pm	5-0	
1/8/2010	St. Lawrence University	Houston Field House	7pm		
1/9/2010	Clarkson University	Houston Field House	4pm		
1/15/2010	Brown University	Providence, RI	7pm		
1/16/2010	Yale University	New Haven, CT	4pm		
1/22/2010	Dartmouth College	Hanover, NH	7pm		
1/23/2010	Harvard University	Cambridge, MA	4pm		
1/29/2010	Quinnipiac University	Houston Field House	7pm		
1/30/2010	Alumnae Game	Houston Field House	1pm		
1/30/2010	Princeton University	Houston Field House	4pm		
2/5/2010	Clarkson University	Potsdam, NY	7pm		
2/6/2010	St. Lawrence University	Canton, NY	4pm		
2/12/2010	Harvard University	Houston Field House	7pm		
2/13/2010	Dartmouth College	Houston Field House	4pm		
2/19/2010	Cornell University	Ithaca, NY	7pm		
2/20/2010	Colgate University	Hamilton, NY	4pm		

== Player stats ==
Allison Wright leads all players in scoring with 25 points (12 goals, 13 assists) after 36 games played. Currently, she leads the Engineers in game-winning goals with three. Whitney Naslund ranks second in team scoring with 24 points (team-best 14 goals, 10 assists). Sophomore center Alisa Harrison ranks third with 23 points (12 goals, 11 assists). Naslund and Harrison have played in all 36 games for the Engineers.

= Indicates team leader

=== Skaters ===
Player	Games	Goals	Assists	Points	Points/game	PIM	GWG	PPG	SHG
Amanda Castignetti	37	1	9	10	0.2703	32	0	0	0
Rossli Chace	14	0	1	1	0.0714	6	0	0	0
Katie Daniels	37	0	8	8	0.2162	36	0	0	0
Kendra Dunlop	37	9	13	22	0.5946	12	1	2	0
Ashley Gaylord	22	0	0	0	0.0000	0	0	0	0
Laura Gersten	37	8	14	22	0.5946	18	3	3	0
Laura Guillemette	33	1	2	3	0.0909	6	0	0	0
Janessa Haller	19	0	3	3	0.1579	8	0	0	0
Alisa Harrison	37	12	11	23	0.6216	8	2	3	1
Taylor Horton	37	7	11	18	0.4865	22	2	2	0
Kristen Jakubowski	35	0	0	0	0.0000	12	0	0	0
Andie Le Donne	30	0	6	6	0.2000	46	0	0	0
Whitney Naslund	37	16	10	26	0.7027	20	3	6	0
Sydney O'Keefe	37	8	6	14	0.3784	12	2	2	0
Clare Padmore	30	1	2	3	0.1000	14	0	0	0
Shannon Ramelot	4	0	0	0	0.0000	0	0	0	0
Audrey Stapleton	34	2	0	2	0.0588	0	0	0	0
Sierra Vadner	37	2	5	7	0.1892	48	0	0	0
Sonja van der Bliek	35	0	0	0	0.0000	0	0	0	0
Jill Vandegrift	37	3	9	12	0.3243	18	0	0	0
Allysen Weidner	36	5	13	18	0.5000	53	0	1	0
Allison Wright	37	12	15	27	0.7297	16	3	3	1

=== Goaltenders ===
In goal, junior Sonja van der Bliek has a 15-14-5 overall record. She is now the all-time career record holder at RPI in six categories, including wins (42-31-11), games played (84), games started (83), minutes played (5161:36), saves (1922) and shutouts (16).

Player	Games Played	Minutes	Goals Against	Wins	Losses	Ties	Shutouts	Save %	Goals Against Average
Shannon Ramelot									
Kristen Burney									
Sonja van der Bliek									

== Postseason ==
- On February 28, Rensselaer made NCAA history. The Engineers beat Quinnipiac, 2–1, but it took five overtimes. It is now the longest college hockey game in NCAA history. Senior defenseman Laura Gersten had the game-winning goal. She registered it at 4:32 of the fifth overtime session to not only clinch the win, but the series victory. RPI advanced to the ECAC Hockey Women's Semifinals for the second consecutive season. The Engineers will face top ranked Cornell University.

Of note, Sonja van der Bliek stopped 98 of the 101 shots as RPI triumphed in a best two out of three playoff series against Quinnipiac. She allowed only three goals while appearing in 293:18 minutes. For the weekend, she posted a goals against average of 0.61. She registered 49 saves on Sunday, February 28 as RPI defeated the Bobcats, in five overtimes. The match was the longest game in NCAA hockey history. This was the fifth Goaltender of the Week honor for van der Bliek in her NCAA career.

== Awards and honors ==
- Laura Gersten, Sarah Devens Award
- Sonja van der Bliek was named the ECAC Goaltender of the Week (for the week of March 1, 2010)
- Allison Wright is a nominee to participate in the 2010 Frozen Four Skills Challenge in April
- Allison Wright, finalist for the 2009-10 ECAC Women's Best Defensive Forward Award

== See also ==
- 2010–11 RPI Engineers women's ice hockey season
