= 2009–10 Princeton Tigers women's ice hockey season =

- Conference: ECAC
- Home ice: Hobey Baker Rink

Record
- Overall: 13–14–4

Coaches and captains
- Head coach: Jeff Kampersal

The Princeton Tigers will represent Princeton University in the 2009–10 NCAA Division I women's ice hockey season. The Tigers will be coached by Jeff Kampersal. Assisting Kampersal are Amy Bourbeau, Francois Bourbeau and Jessica Link.

== Offseason ==
- May 21: Princeton women's hockey coach Jeff Kampersal has announced the team's incoming class that will join the Tigers for the 2009–10 season. The group of five players includes three Americans and two Canadians, and will join a Tiger team that was 18–11–2 last season and finished third in the ECAC Hockey standings. The members of the class of 2013 are:
- 8 - Krystyna Bellisario
  - Defenseman • 5-8 • Shoots Left
  - Woodbridge, Ont. • Toronto Junior Aeros
- 2 - Kelly Cooke
  - Forward • 5-1 • Shoots Left
  - Andover, Mass. • Noble and Greenough School
- 12 - Alex Kinney
  - Forward • 5-9 • Shoots Right
  - Lake Forest, Ill. • The Hotchkiss School
- 23 - Cassie Seguin
  - Goaltender • 5-10 • Catches Left
  - Ingleside, Ont. • NCCP/Ottawa Senators
- Corey Stearns
  - Forward • 5-10 • Shoots Right
  - Falmouth, Mass. • Noble and Greenough School
- July 11: Sasha Sherry is one of 41 players selected to participate in the 2009 USA Hockey Women's National Festival, which will take place August 18–24 in Blaine, Minn. The Festival will serve as the selection camp for the 2009–10 U.S. Women's National Team that will compete in the Qwest Tour, a 10-game domestic tour that begins Sept. 25 and ends just prior to the start of the 2010 Olympic Winter Games in Vancouver, B.C.

== Scrimmages ==
Date	Opponent	Time	Score	Record
Sat, Oct 17	Yale (Scrimmage)	at New Haven, Conn.	12 p.m.	
Sat, Oct 17	Brown (Scrimmage)	at New Haven, Conn.	12 p.m.	

== Regular season ==
=== Standings ===
2009–10 Eastern College Athletic Conference standings
	Conference							Overall					
	GP	W	L	T	PTS	GF	GA	GP	W	L	T	GF	GA
Cornell	22	14	2	6	34	67	26	36	21	9	6	103	63
Clarkson	22	14	5	3	31	47	28	40	23	12	5	104	69
Harvard	22	13	6	3	29	69	40	33	20	8	5	94	54
Quinnipiac	22	11	4	7	29	44	28	37	19	10	8	79	51
Rensselaer	22	11	7	4	26	56	42	37	16	15	6	87	77
Princeton	22	11	7	4	26	52	42	31	13	14	4	72	70
St. Lawrence	22	11	8	3	25	50	41	37	16	14	7	88	85
Colgate	22	8	10	4	20	51	68	36	12	20	4	86	129
Dartmouth	22	9	12	1	19	70	60	28	12	14	2	90	78
Yale	22	8	13	1	17	36	55	29	10	16	3	56	75
Brown	22	1	18	3	5	22	73	28	3	21	4	41	95
Union	22	1	20	1	3	14	75	34	5	28	1	36	110

= Qualified for NCAA Frozen Four	= Qualified for NCAA Tournament

=== Roster ===
Number	Name	Height	Shoots	Position	Class
2	Cooke, Kelly	F	L	5-1	Fr.
4	Stearns, Corey	F	R	5-10	Fr.
5	Landry, Heather	F	L	5-5	So.
6	Elvin, Ann-Marie	D	L	5-7	So.
7	Park, Caroline	F	R	5-4	Jr.
8	Bellisario, Krystyna	D	L	5-8	Fr.
9	Sherry, Sasha	D	R	6-0	Jr.
11	Stadnyk, Charissa	F	R	5-6	So.
12	Kinney, Alex	F	R	5-9	Fr.
13	Martindale, Laura	D	L	5-10	Jr.
15	Endicott, Maddie	D	R	5-8	Sr.
16	DiCesare, Danielle	F	R	5-4	So.
17	Flynn, Julie	F	L	5-7	Sr.
18	Romanchuk, Paula	F	L	5-7	So.
19	Johnson, Julie	F	L	5-7	So.
21	Wallace, Melanie	F	L	5-8	Sr.
23	Seguin, Cassie	G	L	5-10	Fr.
24	Denino, Stephanie	D	L	5-6	Sr.
29	Weber, Rachel	G	L	5-9	So.

=== Schedule ===
Date	Opponent	Location	Time	Score	Record
Fri, Oct 23	Vermont	at Burlington, Vt.	7 p.m.	3-4	0-1-0
Sat, Oct 24	Vermont	at Burlington, Vt.	4 p.m.	7-2	1-1-0
Fri, Oct 30	Rensselaer *	Hobey Baker Rink	7 p.m.	2-2	1-1-1
Sat, Oct 31	Union *	Hobey Baker Rink	4 p.m.	6-3	2-1-1
Fri, Nov 06	Yale *	at New Haven, Conn.	7 p.m.	4-0	3-1-1
Sat, Nov 07	Brown *	at Providence, R.I.	4 p.m.	5-0	
Fri, Nov 13	Dartmouth *	at Hanover, N.H.	7 p.m.	1-4	
Sat, Nov 14	Harvard *	at Cambridge, Mass.	4 p.m.	2-1	
Fri, Nov 20	Cornell *	Hobey Baker Rink	7 p.m.	0-1	
Sat, Nov 21	Colgate *	Hobey Baker Rink	4 p.m.	3-2	
Fri, Nov 27	Boston University	Hobey Baker Rink	4 p.m.	3-1	
Sat, Nov 28	Boston University	Hobey Baker Rink	4 p.m.	2-3	
Fri, Dec 04	St. Lawrence *	at Canton, N.Y.	3:30 p.m.	1-3	
Sat, Dec 05	Clarkson *	at Potsdam, N.Y.	2 p.m.	0-3	
Fri, Dec 11	Syracuse	at Syracuse, N.Y.	7 p.m.	3-4	
Sat, Dec 12	Syracuse	at Syracuse, N.Y.	4 p.m.	0-1	
Thu, Dec 31	Quinnipiac *	at Hamden, Conn.	12 p.m.	2-2	
Sat, Jan 02	Quinnipiac *	Hobey Baker Rink	1 p.m.	1-0	
Tue, Jan 05	Northeastern	Hobey Baker Rink	4 p.m.	0-4	
Fri, Jan 08	Harvard *	Hobey Baker Rink	3 p.m.	3-3	
Sat, Jan 09	Dartmouth *	Hobey Baker Rink	3 p.m.	4-3	
Fri, Jan 29	Union *	at Schenectady, N.Y.	7 p.m.	3-0	
Sat, Jan 30	Rensselaer *	at Troy, N.Y.	4 p.m.	1-1	
Fri, Feb 05	Colgate *	at Hamilton, N.Y.	7 p.m.	3-4	
Sat, Feb 06	Cornell *	at Ithaca, N.Y.	4 p.m.	0-6	
Fri, Feb 12	Clarkson *	Hobey Baker Rink	7 p.m.	1-0	
Sat, Feb 13	St. Lawrence *	Hobey Baker Rink	4 p.m.	3-0	
Fri, Feb 19	Brown *	Hobey Baker Rink	7 p.m.	3-4	
Sat, Feb 20	Yale *	Hobey Baker Rink	4 p.m.	4-0	

= Indicates team leader

== Player stats ==
Player	Games	Goals	Assists	Points	Points/game	PIM	GWG	PPG	SHG
Danielle DiCesare	31	11	16	27	0.8710	18	4	5	0
Paula Romanchuk	31	9	17	26	0.8387	28	2	1	1
Melanie Wallace	31	7	13	20	0.6452	22	2	2	0
Corey Stearns	31	7	12	19	0.6129	6	0	4	0
Heather Landry	31	11	7	18	0.5806	8	2	5	0
Sasha Sherry	31	3	9	12	0.3871	58	1	3	0
Julie Johnson	31	4	7	11	0.3548	8	0	0	0
Kelly Cooke	31	5	4	9	0.2903	6	1	1	0
Laura Martindale	31	5	4	9	0.2903	18	0	2	0
Alex Kinney	31	2	7	9	0.2903	2	1	0	0
Maddie Endicott	31	2	6	8	0.2581	32	0	2	0
Stephanie Denino	29	1	7	8	0.2759	26	0	0	0
Charissa Stadnyk	31	3	4	7	0.2258	10	0	1	0
Julie Flynn	31	2	2	4	0.1290	20	0	0	0
Caroline Park	20	0	2	2	0.1000	0	0	0	0
Cassie Seguin	15	0	1	1	0.0667	0	0	0	0
Krystyna Bellisario	26	0	1	1	0.0385	14	0	0	0
Rachel Weber	20	0	0	0	0.0000	0	0	0	0
Ann-Marie Elvin	18	0	0	0	0.0000	0	0	0	0

=== Goaltenders ===
Player	Games Played	Minutes	Goals Against	Wins	Losses	Ties	Shutouts	Save %	Goals Against Average

== Awards and honors ==
- Sasha Sherry, Pre-Season All-ECAC Team
- Carrie Seguin, ECAC Defensive Player of the Week (Week of November 9)
- Carrie Seguin, ECAC Rookie of the Week (Week of November 9)

=== Ivy League honors ===
- Danielle DiCesare, Forward, Sophomore, 2010 Honorable Mention
- Paula Romanchuk, Forward, Sophomore, 2010 Honorable Mention
- Sasha Sherry, Defense, Junior, 2010 Second Team All-Ivy

== See also ==
- 2009–10 College Hockey America women's ice hockey season
- 2009–10 Eastern College Athletic Conference women's ice hockey season
