= 2009–10 Union Dutchwomen ice hockey season =

2009–10 Union Dutchwomen women's ice hockey season
- Conference: 12 ECAC
- Home ice: Frank L. Messa Rink at Achilles Center

Rankings
- USA Today/USA Hockey Magazine: Not ranked
- USCHO.com/CBS College Sports: Not ranked

Record
- Overall: 5-28-1

Coaches and captains
- Head coach: Claudia Asano
- Assistant coaches: Ali Boe; Marianna Locke
- Captain: Jackie Koetteritz

The 2009–10 Union Dutchwomen women's hockey team represented Union College in the 2009–10 NCAA Division I women's hockey season. The Dutchwomen were a member of the Eastern College Athletic Conference.

== Offseason ==
- May 27 : Marianna Locke, a 2009 graduate of St. Lawrence, has been named an assistant coach on Union’s women’s ice hockey team. Locke, also served as a coach for the Adirondack Regional Team at the 2009 Empire State Games, guiding her team to a bronze medal.
- June 1: Defenseman Jackie Koetteritz and forward Marissa Gentile will captain the 2009-10 Union College women’s ice hockey squad. Koetteritz will be the only senior on the team.
- June 15: The Union College women’s ice hockey team topped ECAC Hockey schools in 2008 raising approximately $11,700 during the “Pink at the Rink” efforts. In 2009, the Dutchwomen raised $4,249.
- June 30: Union women's ice hockey head coach Claudia Asano and assistant coach Ali Boe will serve as coaches for the USA Hockey Player Development Camp. Asano will coach the girl's U-16 team camp, while Boe will be coaching the girl's U-14 team camp in Rochester, NY.
- August 12 : The Union women’s ice hockey team will have six new recruits for the 2009-10 season. The group consists of four forwards, one defenseman and one goaltender. Nicole Bartlett, Katie Faucher, Rhianna Kurio, Alana Marcinko, Emma Rambo and Jeannie Sabourin will join the team.

== Exhibition ==
| Date | Opponent | Location | Time | Score |
| 9/27/2009 | Bluewater | Messa Rink | Noon | 1-3 |

== Regular season ==
The club's overall record was 5 wins, 28 losses and 1 tie. In the ECAC, its conference mark was 1 win, 20 losses and 1 tie. The home record was 4 wins, 12 losses and 1 tie, while the road mark was 1 win, 16 losses and no ties.

On February 20, 2010, senior Jackie Koetteritz, had played in her 125th game for the Dutchwomen, setting a record for the most games in a Dutchwoman uniform.

=== Standings ===
2009–10 Eastern College Athletic Conference standings
| | Conference | | | | | | | Overall | | | | | |
| | GP | W | L | T | PTS | GF | GA | GP | W | L | T | GF | GA |
|---|---|---|---|---|---|---|---|---|---|---|---|---|---|
| Cornell | 22 | 14 | 2 | 6 | 34 | 67 | 26 | 36 | 21 | 9 | 6 | 103 | 63 |
| Clarkson | 22 | 14 | 5 | 3 | 31 | 47 | 28 | 40 | 23 | 12 | 5 | 104 | 69 |
| Harvard | 22 | 13 | 6 | 3 | 29 | 69 | 40 | 33 | 20 | 8 | 5 | 94 | 54 |
| Quinnipiac | 22 | 11 | 4 | 7 | 29 | 44 | 28 | 37 | 19 | 10 | 8 | 79 | 51 |
| Rensselaer | 22 | 11 | 7 | 4 | 26 | 56 | 42 | 37 | 16 | 15 | 6 | 87 | 77 |
| Princeton | 22 | 11 | 7 | 4 | 26 | 52 | 42 | 31 | 13 | 14 | 4 | 72 | 70 |
| St. Lawrence | 22 | 11 | 8 | 3 | 25 | 50 | 41 | 37 | 16 | 14 | 7 | 88 | 85 |
| Colgate | 22 | 8 | 10 | 4 | 20 | 51 | 68 | 36 | 12 | 20 | 4 | 86 | 129 |
| Dartmouth | 22 | 9 | 12 | 1 | 19 | 70 | 60 | 28 | 12 | 14 | 2 | 90 | 78 |
| Yale | 22 | 8 | 13 | 1 | 17 | 36 | 55 | 29 | 10 | 16 | 3 | 56 | 75 |
| Brown | 22 | 1 | 18 | 3 | 5 | 22 | 73 | 28 | 3 | 21 | 4 | 41 | 95 |
| Union | 22 | 1 | 20 | 1 | 3 | 14 | 75 | 34 | 5 | 28 | 1 | 36 | 110 |

| = Qualified for NCAA Frozen Four | = Qualified for NCAA Tournament |

=== Roster ===
| Number | Name | Position | Height | Class |
| 3 | Kayleigh Melia | D | 5-9 | So. |
| 4 | Katie Faucher | D | 5-7 | Fr. |
| 5 | Kelly Alyea | F | 5-4 | So. |
| 7 | Perri Maduri | D | 5-6 | Jr. |
| 8 | Marissa Gentile | F | 5-7 | Jr. |
| 9 | Emilie Arseneault | F | 5-0 | So. |
| 10 | Lauren Cromartie | F | 5-3 | So. |
| 11 | Molly Kate Devin | F | 5-8 | So. |
| 12 | Rhianna Kurio | F | 5-4 | Fr. |
| 14 | Nicole Bartlett | F | 5-2 | Fr. |
| 15 | Callee Heywood | F | 5-6 | Jr. |
| 16 | Lauren Hoffman | F | 5-3 | So. |
| 19 | Chelsey Heinhuis | D | 5-10 | So. |
| 20 | Elsa Perushek | D | 5-3 | Jr. |
| 21 | Suzanne Ostrow | F | 5-5 | Jr. |
| 22 | Emma Rambo | F | 5-2 | Fr. |
| 23 | Jeannie Sabourin | F | 5- | 5 Rf. |
| 24 | Jackie Koetteritz | D | 5-6 | Sr. |
| 27 | Dania Simmonds | D | 5-8 | So. |
| 29 | Alana Marcinko | G | 5-8 | Fr. |
| 35 | Kate Gallagher | G | 5-7 | So. |

=== Schedule ===
| Date | Opponent | Location | Time | Score |
| 10/3/2009 | Northeastern University | Boston | 2:00 pm | Loss, 4-1 |
| 10/9/2009 | University of Vermont | Burlington, VT | 7:00 p.m. | Loss, 2-0 |
| 10/10/2009 | University of Vermont | Burlington, VT | 4:00 p.m. | Loss, 4-1 |
| 10/16/2009 | Sacred Heart University | Messa Rink | 7:00 p.m. | Win, 6-0 |
| 10/17/2009 | Sacred Heart University | Messa Rink | 4:00 p.m. | Win, 3-1 |
| 10/24/2009 | University of Connecticut | Storrs, CT | 7:00 p.m. | Loss, 4-1 |
| 10/30/2009 | Quinnipiac University | Hamden, CT | 7:00 p.m. | Loss, 3-0 |
| 10/31/2009 | Princeton University | Princeton, NJ | 4:00 p.m. | Loss, 6-3 |
| 11/6/2009 | Cornell University | Messa Rink | 2:30 p.m. | Loss, 4-0 |
| 11/7/2009 | Colgate University | Messa Rink | 2:30 p.m. | Loss, 4-0 |
| 11/13/2009 | Brown University | Messa Rink | 7:00 p.m. | Tie, 0-0 |
| 11/14/2009 | Yale University | Messa Rink | 4:00 p.m. | Loss, 2-1 |
| 11/28/2009 | Syracuse University | Syracuse, NY | 2:00 p.m. | Loss, 4-1 |
| 11/29/2009 | Syracuse University | Syracuse, NY | 2:00 p.m. | Loss, 3-2 |
| 12/5/2009 | Rensselaer Polytechnic Institute | Messa Rink | 2:00 p.m. | Loss, 0-2 |
| 12/6/2009 | Rensselaer Polytechnic Institute | Troy, NY | Noon | Loss, 0-5 |
| 12/11/2009 | University of Maine | Messa Rink | 2:00 p.m. | Win, 4-3 |
| 12/12/2009 | University of Maine | Messa Rink | 2:00 p.m. | Loss, 0-4 |
| 1/1/2010 | University of North Dakota | Messa Rink | 7:00 p.m. | Win, 3-1 |
| 1/2/2010 | University of North Dakota | Messa Rink | 4:00 p.m. | Loss, 0-5 |
| 1/8/2010 | Clarkson University | Messa Rink | 7:00 p.m. | Loss, 1-3 |
| 1/9/2010 | St. Lawrence University | Messa Rink | 4:00 p.m. | Loss, 1-3 |
| 1/15/2010 | Yale University | New Haven, CT | 7:00 p.m. | Loss, 0-3 |
| 1/16/2010 | Brown University | Providence, RI | 4:00 p.m. | Win, 3-0 |
| 1/22/2010 | Harvard University | Cambridge, MA | 7:00 p.m. | Loss, 0-4 |
| 1/23/2010 | Dartmouth College | Hanover, NH | 4:00 p.m. | Loss, 1-8 |
| 1/29/2010 | Princeton University | Messa Rink | 7:00 p.m. | Loss, 0-3 |
| 1/30/2010 | Quinnipiac University | Messa Rink | 4:00 p.m. | Loss, 1-3 |
| 2/5/2010 | St. Lawrence University | Canton, NY | 7:00 p.m. | Loss, 0-5 |
| 2/6/2010 | Clarkson University | Potsdam, NY | 4:00 p.m. | Loss, 0-3 |
| 2/12/2010 | Dartmouth College | Messa Rink | 7:00 p.m. | Loss, 0-4 |
| 2/13/2010 | Harvard University | Messa Rink | 4:00 p.m. | Loss, 1-2 |
| 2/19/2010 | Colgate University | Hamilton, NY | 7:00 p.m. | Loss, 1-2 |
| 2/20/2010 | Cornell University | Ithaca, NY | 4:00 p.m. | Loss, 1-6 |

== Player stats ==
=== Skaters ===
| Player | Games Played | Goals | Assists | Points | Penalty Minutes | +/- |

=== Goaltenders ===
| Player | Games Played | Minutes | Goals Against | Wins | Losses | Ties | Shutouts | Save % | Goals Against Average |
| Alana Marcinko | | | | | | | | | |
| Kate Gallagher | | | | | | | | | |

== Awards and honors ==
- Jackie Koetteritz, Alternates for the 2010 Frozen Four Skills Challenge
- Emma Rambo, ECAC Rookie of the Week (Week of October 5)

=== Team Awards ===
- Jackie Koetteritz, 2010 George Morrison Most Valuable Player award
- Jackie Koetteritz, 2010 Hana Yamasita Coaches Award winner
- Perri Maduri and Dania Simmonds, 2010 Most Improved Player award (tie)
- Alana Marcinko, 2010 Dutchwomen Rookie of the Year
- Kayleigh Melia, 2010 Unsung Hero award
- Elsa Perushek, 2010 Ashley Kilstein Community Service Award
