= 2009–10 Cornell Big Red women's ice hockey season =

ECAC Regular season champions ECAC tournament champions NCAA Frozen Four, Runner-up, Lost 3-2 (3OT) to Minnesota Duluth
- Conference: 1 ECAC
- Home ice: Lynah Rink

Rankings
- USA Today/USA Hockey Magazine: 2
- USCHO.com/CBS College Sports: 6

Record
- Overall: 21-9-6

Coaches and captains
- Head coach: Doug Derraugh
- Assistant coaches: Danielle Bilodeau; Edith Zimmering
- Captain: Kelly McGinty

The 2009–10 Cornell Big Red women's ice hockey team represented Cornell University in the 2009–10 NCAA Division I women's hockey season. The Big Red were coached by Doug Derraugh and assisted by Dani Bilodeau and Edith Zimmering. The Big Red were a member of the Eastern College Athletic Conference and were one of the most improved teams in the NCAA. The Big Red won 21 games, an improvement of nine wins over the 2008-09 season. The Big Red finished second in the USA Today poll and were 21-9-6 overall. The team won both the regular season ECAC title with a 14-2-6 record as well as the Ivy League title. Cornell won the league's post-season tournament, defeating Clarkson 4-3 in overtime in the championship game. The team qualified for the NCAA tournament and advanced to the championship game before losing to Minnesota-Duluth 3-2 in the third overtime period. Coach Derraugh was named the AHCA Division 1 Coach of the Year.

== Offseason ==
- August 17: A trio of Big Red players were selected to the Canadian U22 National Team. Sophomore Catherine White and incoming freshmen Lauriane Rougeau and Laura Fortino were selected among the 23-player roster. Chelsea Karpenko participated at the camp but was not named to the team.
- Sept. 4: Rebecca Johnston has scored five goals in two games, including her first career hat trick, in the 2009 Canada Cup.

== Exhibition ==
Date	Opponent	Location	Score
October 18	Toronto Aeros	Lynah Rink	5-5

== Regular season ==
- Oct 31: The Cornell women's hockey team defeated its second straight ranked opponent with a 4-3 victory over #9 Harvard on Saturday afternoon. The win gives the Big Red its first ever weekend sweep against Dartmouth and Harvard after Cornell's 3-0 win against Dartmouth.
- February 17: Laura Fortino, Lauriane Rougeau and Catherine White are among 45 nominees for the Patty Kazmaier Memorial Award.
- March 4: Catherine White has been named a finalist for the ECAC Player of the Year Award.
- March 6: ECAC Hockey announced that Catherine White has been awarded the Player of the Year award. White led the ECAC in assists with 24.

=== Standings ===
2009–10 Eastern College Athletic Conference standings
	Conference							Overall					
	GP	W	L	T	PTS	GF	GA	GP	W	L	T	GF	GA
Cornell	22	14	2	6	34	67	26	36	21	9	6	103	63
Clarkson	22	14	5	3	31	47	28	40	23	12	5	104	69
Harvard	22	13	6	3	29	69	40	33	20	8	5	94	54
Quinnipiac	22	11	4	7	29	44	28	37	19	10	8	79	51
Rensselaer	22	11	7	4	26	56	42	37	16	15	6	87	77
Princeton	22	11	7	4	26	52	42	31	13	14	4	72	70
St. Lawrence	22	11	8	3	25	50	41	37	16	14	7	88	85
Colgate	22	8	10	4	20	51	68	36	12	20	4	86	129
Dartmouth	22	9	12	1	19	70	60	28	12	14	2	90	78
Yale	22	8	13	1	17	36	55	29	10	16	3	56	75
Brown	22	1	18	3	5	22	73	28	3	21	4	41	95
Union	22	1	20	1	3	14	75	34	5	28	1	36	110

= Qualified for NCAA Frozen Four	= Qualified for NCAA Tournament

=== Roster ===
**Number**	**Name**	**Position**	**Height**	**Class**
4	Kendice Ogilvie	F	5-7	So.
6	Melanie Jue	F	5-5	Sr.
7	Lauriane Rougeau	D	5-8	Fr.
9	Xandra Hompe	F	5-8	Fr.
12	Kelly McGinty	F	5-2	Sr.
13	Amanda Young	D	5-6	So.
14	Laura Danforth	F	5-4	Sr.
15	Jess Martino	D	5-5	So.
19	Hayley Hughes	F	5-6	Jr.
20	Catherine White	F	5-9	So.
21	Amber Overguard	D/F	5-8	Jr.
23	Jenna Paulson	D	5-9	So.
24	Liz Zorn	F	5-6	Sr.
26	Chelsea Karpenko	F	5-6	So.
27	Karlee Overguard	F	5-8	Jr.
29	Amanda Mazzotta	G	5-5	So.
35	Katie Wilson	G	5-6	Jr.
77	Laura Fortino	D	5-6	Fr.

=== Schedule ===
**Date**	**Opponent**	**Location**	**Score**
**October 23**	**Mercyhurst (nc)**	**Lynah Rink**	1-4 Loss
**October 24**	**Mercyhurst (nc)**	**Lynah Rink**	1-4 Loss
**October 30**	**Dartmouth**	**Lynah Rink**	3-0 Win
**October 31**	**Harvard**	**Lynah Rink**	4-3 Win
November 6	at Union	Schenectady, NY	4-0 Win
November 7	at RPI	Troy, NY	3-1 Win
**November 13**	**Clarkson**	**Lynah Rink**	2-0 Win
**November 14**	**St. Lawrence**	**Lynah Rink**	3-2 Loss
November 20	at Princeton	Princeton, NJ	1-0 Win
November 21	at Quinnipiac	Hamden, CT	3-3 Tie
**November 28**	**Niagara (nc)**	**Lynah Rink**	2-1 Win
**November 29**	**Niagara (nc)**	**Lynah Rink**	2-1 Loss
**December 4**	**Yale**	**Lynah Rink**	2-2 Tie
**December 5**	**Brown**	**Lynah Rink**	5-0 Win
January 9	at Providence (nc)	Providence, RI	6-3 Loss
January 10	at Providence (nc)	Providence, RI	3-0 Loss
January 15	at Harvard	Boston, MA	4-4 Tie
January 16	at Dartmouth	Hanover, NH	3-1 Win
January 22	at Colgate	Hamilton, NY	3-3 Tie
**January 23**	**Colgate**	**Lynah Rink**	6-0 Win
January 29	at St. Lawrence	Canton, NY	2-2 Tie
January 30	at Clarkson	Potsdam, NY	2-1 Loss
**February 5**	**Quinnipiac**	**Lynah Rink**	0-0 Tie
**February 6**	**Princeton**	**Lynah Rink**	6-0 Win
February 12	at Brown	Providence, RI	4-0 Win
February 13	at Yale	New Haven, CT	1-0 Win
**February 19**	**RPI**	**Lynah Rink**	2-1 Win
**February 20**	**Union**	**Lynah Rink**	6-1 Win

(nc) stands for non-conference

Home Games in BOLD

== Player stats ==
= Indicates team leader

=== Skaters ===
Player	Games	Goals	Assists	Points	Points/game	PIM	GWG	PPG	SHG
Catherine White	33	13	29	42	1.2727	34	3	3	0
Laura Fortino	33	13	21	34	1.0303	2	3	6	1
Lauriane Rougeau	33	10	22	32	0.9697	38	3	3	1
Chelsea Karpenko	35	17	14	31	0.8857	14	2	8	0
Karlee Overguard	34	13	9	22	0.6471	28	2	1	2
Melanie Jue	36	9	11	20	0.5556	38	2	3	0
Kendice Ogilvie	36	6	10	16	0.4444	22	4	1	0
Liz Zorn	36	5	11	16	0.4444	20	1	1	0
Laura Danforth	36	5	6	11	0.3056	28	0	1	0
Hayley Hughes	31	6	3	9	0.2903	2	1	1	0
Amber Overguard	35	3	6	9	0.2571	14	0	0	0
Amanda Young	36	2	5	7	0.1944	14	0	2	0
Jess Martino	34	0	6	6	0.1765	4	0	0	0
Kelly McGinty	36	1	4	5	0.1389	10	0	0	0
Katie Wilson	1	0	0	0	0.0000	0	0	0	0
Amanda Mazzotta	35	0	0	0	0.0000	0	0	0	0
Jenna Paulson	32	0	0	0	0.0000	2	0	0	0
Xandra Hompe	30	0	0	0	0.0000	2	0	0	0

=== Goaltenders ===
Player	Games played	Minutes	Goals against	Wins	Losses	Ties	Shutouts	Save %
Amanda Mazzotta	7	417	11	5	2	0	138	.926
Katie Wilson								

== Postseason ==
- March 7: Sophomore Kendice Ogilvie beat Clarkson goaltender Lauren Dahm at 7:52 mark in overtime. With the victory, Cornell wins its first ECAC tournament, and earns its first trip to the NCAA Frozen Four.

=== NCAA tournament ===
- On March 13, 2010, Cornell defeated the Harvard Crimson women's ice hockey program by a score of 6-2 to earn its first ever trip to the NCAA Frozen Four.
- March 21: Cornell goaltender Amanda Mazzotta set a record for most saves in an NCAA Championship game with 61 saves. The former record holder was Bulldog goaltender Patricia Sautter who had 41 saves in 2003.

== Awards and honors ==
- Doug Derragh, Division I Coach of the Year
- Laura Fortino, 2010 ECAC All-Rookie Team
- Amanda Mazzotta, ECAC Defensive Player of the Week (Week of November 2)
- Kendice Ogilvie, ECAC tournament Most Outstanding Player
- Lauriane Rougeau, 2010 ECAC All-Rookie Team
- Catherine White, Pre-Season All-ECAC Team
- Catherine White, ECAC Player of the Year
- Liz Zorn, finalist for the 2009-10 ECAC Women’s Best Defensive Forward Award

=== All-America selections ===
- Laura Fortino, 2010 Women's RBK Hockey Division I All-America First Team
- Lauriane Rougeau, 2010 Women's RBK Hockey Division I All-America Second Team
- Catherine White, 2010 Women's RBK Hockey Division I All-America Second Team

=== Ivy League honors ===
- Laura Fortino, Defense, Freshman, 2010 First Team All-Ivy
- Chelsea Karpenko, Forward, Sophomore, 2010 Second Team All-Ivy
- Amanda Mazzotta, Goaltender, Sophomore, 2010 First Team All-Ivy
- Lauriane Rougeau, Defense, Freshman, 2010 First Team All-Ivy
- Lauriane Rougeau, 2010 Ivy League Rookie of the Year
- Catherine White, Forward, Sophomore, 2010 First Team All-Ivy
- Catherine White, 2010 Ivy League Player of the Year

== See also ==
- 2009–10 College Hockey America women's ice hockey season
- 2009–10 Eastern College Athletic Conference women's ice hockey season
