= 2009–10 Dartmouth Big Green women's ice hockey season =

- Conference: ECAC
- Home ice: Thompson Arena

Rankings
- USA Today/USA Hockey Magazine: 8
- USCHO.com/CBS College Sports: 8

Record

Coaches and captains
- Head coach: Mark Hudak
- Assistant coaches: Sara Simard
- Captain(s): Sarah Parsons, Jenna Cunningham

This is a history of the 2009–10 season of the Dartmouth Big Green women's ice hockey team.

== Off-season ==
- July 13: Dartmouth forward Sarah Parsons has been named one of 41 skaters to participate in the 2009 USA Hockey Women's National Festival, which will serve as the selection camp for the 2009-10 U.S. National Team.
- July 21: Dartmouth sophomore Reagan Fischer was recently selected as one of 42 players to be chosen to compete for a spot on the Canadian National Women's Under-22 Team. The camp will take place from August 7–14 at Father David Bauer Olympic Arena in Calgary.
- August 3: The Dartmouth women's hockey team has traded venues with Boston College as the two teams have agreed to move their game on Jan. 27 to Thompson Arena. The game was originally scheduled to be played at Conte Forum.

With the addition, the Big Green will be playing eight-consecutive home games from Jan. 15 to Feb. 6. The year kicks off with an exhibition matchup against McGill on Oct. 23 and Dartmouth opens the 2009-10 season on the road at Cornell on Oct. 30.

== Exhibition ==
Date	Opponent	Location	Tim	Score
Fri, Oct 23	McGill (Exh.)	Hanover, N.H.	4:00 p.m.	Dartmouth, 4-2

== Regular season ==
- October 5: The Dartmouth women's hockey team was ranked No. 8 in the country. The USCHO.com officials revealed it in their first Top-10 Women's Hockey Poll of the season. Dartmouth accumulated 40 points.
- November 21: Against the Yale Bulldogs, Jenna Cunningham reached the 100-point milestone. She registered two goals as the Big Green triumphed by a 6-2 score.
- January 23: Cunningham posted a career-high four goals in the 8-1 win over Union to snap a seven-game winless streak. This season she led the team with five game-winning goals.
- February 6: Senior co-captain Sarah Parsons tallied her 150th career point and the Dartmouth women's hockey team came away with a 4-2 win over Brown on Senior Night at Thompson Arena. Parsons became the eighth Dartmouth player to accumulate 150 points.
- February 17: Sarah Parsons and Amanda Trunzo are among 45 nominees for the Patty Kazmaier Memorial Award.
- February 26: Dartmouth alums Gillian Apps and Cherie Piper both won Olympic Gold medals with Canada's Women's Olympic Hockey team.
- March 4: Sarah Parsons has been named a finalist for the ECAC Player of the Year Award.

=== Standings ===
2009–10 Eastern College Athletic Conference standings
	Conference							Overall					
	GP	W	L	T	PTS	GF	GA	GP	W	L	T	GF	GA
Cornell	22	14	2	6	34	67	26	36	21	9	6	103	63
Clarkson	22	14	5	3	31	47	28	40	23	12	5	104	69
Harvard	22	13	6	3	29	69	40	33	20	8	5	94	54
Quinnipiac	22	11	4	7	29	44	28	37	19	10	8	79	51
Rensselaer	22	11	7	4	26	56	42	37	16	15	6	87	77
Princeton	22	11	7	4	26	52	42	31	13	14	4	72	70
St. Lawrence	22	11	8	3	25	50	41	37	16	14	7	88	85
Colgate	22	8	10	4	20	51	68	36	12	20	4	86	129
Dartmouth	22	9	12	1	19	70	60	28	12	14	2	90	78
Yale	22	8	13	1	17	36	55	29	10	16	3	56	75
Brown	22	1	18	3	5	22	73	28	3	21	4	41	95
Union	22	1	20	1	3	14	75	34	5	28	1	36	110

= Qualified for NCAA Frozen Four	= Qualified for NCAA Tournament

=== Roster ===
Number	Name	Position	Height	Class
1	Mariel Lacina	G	5-10	Sr.
2	Margaux Sharp	D	5-9	Fr.
3	Sue Schmitz	D	5-5	Sr.
4	Kelly Foley	F	5-5	So.
5	Sarah Toupal	F	5-8	Sr.
6	Jenna Hobeika	F	5-4	So.
7	Camille Dumais	F		Fr.
8	Brittany Mills	F	5-11	So.
9	Jessica Gagner	F	5-7	Fr.
11	Katie Horner	D	5-10	Jr.
12	Lisa Berreman	F	5-9	Fr.
13	Geneva Kliman	D	5-8	So.
14	Erica Dobos	F	5-8	So.
17	Larissa Roche	F	5-7	Jr.
18	Sally Komarek	F	5-7	Fr.
19	Reagan Fischer	F	5-8	So.
20	Alyssa Boehm	F	5-7	Jr.
21	Amanda Trunzo	F	5-4	Jr.
22	Jenna Cunningham	F	5-5	Sr.
23	Moira Scanlon	D	5-8	So.
24	Sasha Nanji	D		Fr.
27	Sarah Parsons	F	5-8	Sr.
29	Sarah Kennedy	G	5-8	Sr.
30	Whitney Woodcox	G	5-9	Fr.

=== Schedule ===
Date	Opponent	Location	Time	Score	Record
Fri, Oct 30	Cornell *	at Ithaca, N.Y.	3:00 p.m.	0-3	0-1-0
Sat, Oct 31	Colgate *	at Hamilton, N.Y.	3:30 p.m.	5-5	0-1-1
Fri, Nov 06	St. Lawrence *	Hanover, N.H.	7:00 p.m.	4-2	1-1-1
Sat, Nov 07	Clarkson *	Hanover, N.H.	4:00 p.m.	1-3	1-2-1
Fri, Nov 13	Princeton *	Hanover, N.H.	7:00 p.m.	4-1	2-2-1
Sat, Nov 14	Quinnipiac *	Hanover, N.H.	4:00 p.m.	1-2	2-3-1
Fri, Nov 20	Brown *	at Providence, R.I.	7:00 p.m.	5-2	3-3-1
Sat, Nov 21	Yale *	at New Haven, Conn.	4:00 p.m.	6-2	4-3-1
Wed, Nov 25	Harvard *	at Cambridge, Mass.	7:00 p.m.	2-3	4-4-1
Sat, Nov 28	Vermont	at Burlington, Vt.	7:00 p.m.	4-3	5-4-1
Sat, Dec 12	New Hampshire	Hanover, N.H.	7:00 p.m.	1-4	5-5-1
Wed, Dec 30	Vermont	Hanover, N.H.	7:00 p.m.	4-2	6-5-1
Sat, Jan 02	Connecticut	at Storrs, Conn.	1:00 p.m.	2-3	6-6-1
Sun, Jan 03	Connecticut	at Storrs, Conn.	1:00 p.m.	3-3	6-6-2
Fri, Jan 08	Quinnipiac *	at Hamden, Conn.	3:00 p.m.	1-2	6-7-2
Sat, Jan 09	Princeton *	at Princeton, N.J.	3:00 p.m.	3-4	6-8-2
Fri, Jan 15	Colgate *	Hanover, N.H.	7:00 p.m.	4-6	6-9-2
Sat, Jan 16	Cornell *	Hanover, N.H.	4:00 p.m.	1-3	6-10-2
Fri, Jan 22	Rensselaer *	Hanover, N.H.	7:00 p.m.	1-2	6-11-2
Sat, Jan 23	Union *	Hanover, N.H.	4:00 p.m.	8-1	7-11-2
Wed, Jan 27	Boston College	Hanover, N.H.	7:00 p.m.	6-3	8-11-2
Fri, Jan 29	Harvard *	Hanover, N.H.	3:30 p.m.	1-4	8-12-2
Fri, Feb 05	Yale *	Hanover, N.H.	7:00 p.m.	6-3	9-12-2
Sat, Feb 06	Brown *	Hanover, N.H.	4:00 p.m.	4-2	10-12-2
Fri, Feb 12	Union *	at Schenectady, N.Y.	7:00 p.m.	4-0	11-12-2
Sat, Feb 13	Rensselaer *	at Troy, N.Y.	4:00 p.m.		
Fri, Feb 19	Clarkson *	at Potsdam, N.Y	7:00 p.m.		
Sat, Feb 20	St. Lawrence *	at Canton, N.Y.	4:00 p.m.		

== Player stats ==
- Sarah Parsons posted 40 points on 20 goals and 20 assists as she led the Ivy League and ECAC Hockey. Her 20 goals were a career high. Parsons finished the year on a six-game point streak and led the team with 13 multi-point games. Parsons concluded her career with 156 total points, which places her eighth all-time (her 66 goals are top-10 in Big Green history, and her 90 assists tie with Carly Haggard '03 for seventh all-time).
- Jenna Cunningham was named to the New England Hockey Writers All-Star team (and the ECAC Second Team) for the third consecutive year. She reached a new career high with 18 goals. For the third consecutive year, she finished with at least 30 points. Cunningham finished her Dartmouth with 63 points and 62 assists for 125 points (ranking 16th overall in Big Green career scoring). By reaching 60 goals and 60 assists in her career, she became only one of 16 players in Big Green history to reach 100 points.

=== Skaters ===
= Indicates team leader

Player	Games	Goals	Assists	Points	Points/game	PIM	GWG	PPG	SHG
Sarah Parsons	28	20	20	40	1.4286	14	2	6	0
Amanda Trunzo	27	18	15	33	1.2222	33	0	5	0
Jenna Cunningham	28	18	13	31	1.1071	24	5	6	0
Camille Dumais	28	10	15	25	0.8929	10	2	3	0
Sasha Nanji	28	6	13	19	0.6786	12	0	4	0
Sally Komarek	28	3	12	15	0.5357	12	0	1	0
Jenna Hobeika	28	4	8	12	0.4286	24	1	1	0
Sarah Toupal	28	4	8	12	0.4286	10	0	1	0
Kelly Foley	15	3	9	12	0.8000	8	2	1	0
Geneva Kliman	27	1	6	7	0.2593	36	0	0	0
Erica Dobos	28	1	3	4	0.1429	6	0	1	0
Lisa Berreman	26	0	4	4	0.1538	8	0	0	0
Margaux Sharp	28	0	3	3	0.1071	26	0	0	0
Larissa Roche	13	0	2	2	0.1538	0	0	0	0
Moira Scanlon	27	0	2	2	0.0741	16	0	0	0
Alyssa Boehm	28	1	0	1	0.0357	14	0	0	0
Jessica Gagner	27	1	0	1	0.0370	6	0	0	0
Katie Horner	22	0	1	1	0.0455	12	0	0	0
Sue Schmitz	24	0	0	0	0.0000	8	0	0	0
Sarah Kennedy	1	0	0	0	0.0000	0	0	0	0
Whitney Woodcox	7	0	0	0	0.0000	0	0	0	0
Mariel Lacina	23	0	0	0	0.0000	0	0	0	0

=== Goaltenders ===
Player	Games Played	Minutes	Goals Against	Wins	Losses	Ties	Shutouts	Save %	Goals Against Average

== Awards and honors ==
- Jenna Cunningham, Pre-Season All-ECAC Team
- Jenna Cunningham, New England Hockey Writers All-Star Team
- Camille Dumais, 2009-10 ECAC Hockey All-Rookie Team
- Sarah Parsons, Finalist for the 2009-10 ECAC Women's Best Defensive Forward Award
- Sarah Parsons, Frozen Four Skills Competition participant
- Sarah Parsons, New England Hockey Writers All-Star Team
- Sarah Toupal, ECAC Hockey Player of the Week (Week of February 8)

- Sarah Parsons, Forward, Senior, 2010 First Team All-Ivy

== See also ==
- 2009–10 College Hockey America women's ice hockey season
- 2009–10 Eastern College Athletic Conference women's ice hockey season
- 2009–10 NCAA Division I women's ice hockey season
