= 2009–10 Yale Bulldogs women's ice hockey season =

- Conference: ECAC
- Home ice: Ingalls Rink

Rankings
- USA Today/USA Hockey Magazine: Not ranked
- USCHO.com/CBS College Sports: Not ranked

Record
- Overall: 3-8-2
- Home: 1-5-0
- Road: 2-3-2

Coaches and captains
- Head coach: Hilary Witt
- Captain: Caroline Murphy

The Yale Bulldogs women's hockey team represented Yale University in the 2009–10 NCAA Division I women's ice hockey season. The Bulldogs were coached by Hilary Witt. Witt was assisted by Kim Mathias and Paul Nemetz-Carlson. The strength and conditioning coach is Joe Maher.

== Offseason ==
- June 14: With eight players having graduated in 2009, the Yale women's ice hockey team began to recruit for the Class of 2013. Eight incoming freshmen will join the roster for 2009–10. The eight are Erin Callahan, Emily DesMeules, Jamie Gray, Jen Matichuk, Danielle Moncion, Tara Tomimoto, Natalie Wedell, and Alyssa Zupon.
- July 9: Two former Yale Bulldogs were invited to USA Hockey's National Festival. Forward Crysti Howser and defenseman Helen Resor are among the group of 41 elite players who will head to Blaine, Minn., Aug. 18-24 for a series of practices and games. After the National Festival 23 of those players will be chosen to go on the Qwest Tour as the U.S. Women's National Team, and 21 of those players then will be selected to play for Team USA in the 2010 Olympics. Resor is one of nine players on the National Festival roster who have played in the Olympics before.

== Exhibition ==
Date	Opponent	Score	Time	Record
Oct. 23	Providence	Tie, 2-2		0-0-1
Oct. 25	McGill	Yale, 4-2	2:00 PM	1-0-1

== Regular season ==
- January 8: Mandi Schwartz returned to Yale on Jan. 8 after a year away from school battling leukemia.
- February 10, 2010: Yale women's hockey head coach Hilary Witt was inducted into the Women's Beanpot Hall of Fame. The induction honors her performance as a player for Northeastern in the annual tournament featuring the four Boston-area women's hockey teams. The ceremony was held prior to the Beanpot Championship game at Harvard's Bright Center.
- February 17: Bray Ketchum and Jaclyn Snikeris of Yale are among 45 nominees for the Patty Kazmaier Memorial Award.

=== Standings ===
2009–10 Eastern College Athletic Conference standings
	Conference							Overall					
	GP	W	L	T	PTS	GF	GA	GP	W	L	T	GF	GA
Cornell	22	14	2	6	34	67	26	36	21	9	6	103	63
Clarkson	22	14	5	3	31	47	28	40	23	12	5	104	69
Harvard	22	13	6	3	29	69	40	33	20	8	5	94	54
Quinnipiac	22	11	4	7	29	44	28	37	19	10	8	79	51
Rensselaer	22	11	7	4	26	56	42	37	16	15	6	87	77
Princeton	22	11	7	4	26	52	42	31	13	14	4	72	70
St. Lawrence	22	11	8	3	25	50	41	37	16	14	7	88	85
Colgate	22	8	10	4	20	51	68	36	12	20	4	86	129
Dartmouth	22	9	12	1	19	70	60	28	12	14	2	90	78
Yale	22	8	13	1	17	36	55	29	10	16	3	56	75
Brown	22	1	18	3	5	22	73	28	3	21	4	41	95
Union	22	1	20	1	3	14	75	34	5	28	1	36	110

= Qualified for NCAA Frozen Four	= Qualified for NCAA Tournament

=== Roster ===
Number	Name	Position	Class	Height
1	Erin Callahan	G	Fr.	5-7
24	Alyssa Clarke	D	Sr.	5-9
20	Lauren Davis	F	So.	5-7
13	Emily DesMeules	D	Fr.	5-9
26	Heather Grant	D	So.	5-8
7	Jamie Gray	D	Fr.	5-5
11	Aleca Hughes	F	So.	5-10
5	Berit Johnson	F	Sr.	5-5
27	Bray Ketchum	F	Jr.	5-8
35	Genny Ladiges	G	So.	5-8
3	Samantha MacLean	D	Jr.	5-6
6	Becky Mantell	F	So.	5-6
20	Jen Matichuk	F	Fr.	5-5
9	Danielle Moncion	F	Fr.	5-8
14	Caroline Murphy	F	Sr.	5-6
12	Lili Rudis	F	Jr.	5-9
17	Mandi Schwartz	F	Sr.	5-5
32	Jackee Snikeris	G	Jr.	5-6
4	Tara Tomimoto	D	Fr.	5-5
11	Natalie Wedell	D/F	Fr.	5-8
8	Alyssa Zupon	F	Fr.	5-6

=== Schedule ===
- The Nutmeg Classic will held on November 27 and 28.

Date	Opponent	Score	Time	Record
Oct. 23	Providence	Tie, 2-2	7:00 PM	
Oct. 30	at St. Lawrence *	Loss, 0-4	4:00 PM	0-1-0
Oct. 31	at Clarkson *	Loss, 0-2	2:00 PM	0-2-0
Nov. 6	Princeton *	Loss, 0-4	7:00 PM	0-3-0
Nov. 7	Quinnipiac *	Loss, 1-2	4:00 PM	0-4-0
Nov. 13	at Rensselaer *	Loss, 1-4	7:00 PM	0-5-0
Nov. 14	at Union *	Win, 2-1	4:00 PM	1-5-0
Nov. 20	Harvard *	Loss, 0-5	7:00 PM	1-6-0
Nov. 21	Dartmouth *	Loss, 2-6	6:00 PM	1-7-0
Nov. 27	Sacred Heart	Win, 10-1	4:00 PM	2-7-0
Nov. 28	Connecticut	Loss, 1-6	TBA	2-8-0
Dec. 4	at Cornell *	Tie, 2-2	7:00 PM	2-8-1
Dec. 5	at Colgate *	Win, 3-0	4:00 PM	3-8-1
Jan. 1	Northeastern		3:00 PM	
Jan. 2	Vermont	Win, 3-1	3:00 PM	
Jan. 8	at Boston U.		5:00 PM	
Jan. 9	at Boston College		2:00 PM	
Jan. 15	Union *		7:00 PM	3-0
Jan. 16	Rensselaer *		4:00 PM	
Jan. 22	Clarkson *		7:00 PM	
Jan. 23	St. Lawrence *		4:00 PM	
Jan. 30	Brown *		2:00 PM	
Jan. 31	at Brown *		2:00 PM	
Feb. 5	at Dartmouth *		7:00 PM	
Feb. 6	at Harvard *		4:00 PM	
Feb. 12	Colgate *		7:00 PM	
Feb. 13	Cornell *		4:00 PM	
Feb. 19	at Quinnipiac *		7:00 PM	
Feb. 20	at Princeton *		4:00 PM	

== Player stats ==
=== Skaters ===
Player	Games Played	Goals	Assists	Points	Penalty Minutes	+/-

=== Goaltenders ===
Player	Games Played	Minutes	Goals Against	Wins	Losses	Ties	Shutouts	Save %	Goals Against Average
Erin Callahan									
Jackee Snikeris									

== Awards and honors ==
- Alyssa Clarke, Defense, Senior, 2010 Honorable Mention
- Aleca Hughes, ECAC All-Academic
- Bray Ketchum, Forward, Junior, 2010 Second Team All-Ivy
- Jacklyn Snikeris, Goaltender, Junior, 2010 First Team All-Ivy
- Jacklyn Snikeris, ECAC All-Academic
