= 2009–10 Colgate Raiders women's ice hockey season =

College ice hockey season

- Conference: 8th in ECAC
- Home ice: J. Howard Starr Rink

Rankings
- USA Today/USA Hockey Magazine: Unranked
- USCHO.com/CBS College Sports: Unranked

Record
- Overall: 12-20-4
- Conference: 8-10-4
- Home: 5-6-3
- Road: 7-14-1

Coaches and captains
- Head coach: Scott Wiley
- Captain: Ali Edell
- Alternate captain(s): Marissa Dombovy, Beth Rotenberg

The Colgate Raiders represented Colgate University in the 2009–10 NCAA Division I women's ice hockey season. They would end up a disappointing 12-20-4 despite having 19 wins in the previous season, not being able to overcome a dreadful 1-7-1 start (they would go 11-11-3 for the rest of the regular season). 2009-2010 would be the beginning of a 5 year streak where they would fail to have a winning season, and it would not be until the 2017-2018 season that they would make the NCAA tournament.

== Offseason ==
- July 20: Colgate University announced the signing of six student-athletes to join the team as the Class of 2013. The players are three defenders, two forwards and one goaltender.
- Jordan Brickner – 5-8, D, Lake Forest, Ill. (Connecticut Stars)
- Jessica Hootz - 5-9, D, Edmonton, Alta. (Edmonton Thunder)
- Jenna Klynstra - 5-9, F, Edmonton, Alta. (Edmonton Thunder)
- Brittany Phillips - 5-5, F, Lauder, Man. (Westman Wildcats)
- Whitney Routman - 5-8, D, Northbrook, Ill. (Chicago Mission)
- Jocelyn Yokow - 5-4, G, Windsor, Conn. (Connecticut Polar Bears)

== Regular season ==
=== Standings ===
2009–10 Eastern College Athletic Conference standings
	Conference							Overall					
	GP	W	L	T	PTS	GF	GA	GP	W	L	T	GF	GA
Cornell	22	14	2	6	34	67	26	36	21	9	6	103	63
Clarkson	22	14	5	3	31	47	28	40	23	12	5	104	69
Harvard	22	13	6	3	29	69	40	33	20	8	5	94	54
Quinnipiac	22	11	4	7	29	44	28	37	19	10	8	79	51
Rensselaer	22	11	7	4	26	56	42	37	16	15	6	87	77
Princeton	22	11	7	4	26	52	42	31	13	14	4	72	70
St. Lawrence	22	11	8	3	25	50	41	37	16	14	7	88	85
Colgate	22	8	10	4	20	51	68	36	12	20	4	86	129
Dartmouth	22	9	12	1	19	70	60	28	12	14	2	90	78
Yale	22	8	13	1	17	36	55	29	10	16	3	56	75
Brown	22	1	18	3	5	22	73	28	3	21	4	41	95
Union	22	1	20	1	3	14	75	34	5	28	1	36	110

= Qualified for NCAA Frozen Four	= Qualified for NCAA Tournament

=== Roster ===
Number	Name	Position	Height	Class
1	Kimberly Sass	G	5-5	So.
2	Ali Edell	D	5-4	Sr.
3	Nicole McDonald	F	5-7	Sr.
4	Krista Dermott	F	5-8	So.
5	Katie Stewart	F	5-8	Sr.
6	Jacquie Colborne	F	5-5	Jr.
8	Whitney Routman	D	5-8	Fr.
9	Jessica Hootz	D	5-9	Fr.
11	Jenna Klynstra	F	5-9	Fr.
13	Marissa Dombovy	F	5-8	Sr.
14	Beth Rotenberg	F	5-8	Sr.
16	Heidi Peterson	F	5-10	So.
17	Jordan Brickner	D	5-8	Fr.
18	Amanda Kirwan	D	5-5	So.
19	Hannah Milan	F	5-3	Jr.
21	Brittany Philips	F	5-5	Fr.
23	Jessi Waters	F	5-7	Jr.
24	Kristi-Lyn Pollock	D	5-5	So.
25	Evan Minnick	F	5-3	Sr.
29	Jocelyn Yokow	G	5-4	Fr.
30	Lisa Plenderleith	G	5-5	Jr.

=== Schedule ===
Date	Opponent	Time	Score	Record
10/9/2009	University of New Hampshire	7 p.m.	Loss, 4-0	0-1-0
10/10/2009	Boston College	5 p.m.	Loss, 3-5	0-2-0
10/16/2009	Providence College	7 p.m.	Loss, 1-4	0-3-0
10/17/2009	University of Connecticut	4 p.m.	Win, 5-2	1-3-0
10/23/2009	Wayne State University	7 p.m.	Loss, 3-4	1-4-0
10/24/2009	Wayne State University	2 p.m.	Loss, 0-1	1-5-0
10/30/2009	Harvard University	7 p.m.	Loss, 1-2	1-6-0
10/31/2009	Dartmouth College	3:30 p.m.	Draw, 5-5	1-6-1
11/6/2009	Rensselaer	2:30 p.m.	Loss, 4-10	1-7-1
11/7/2009	Union College	2:30 p.m.	Win, 4-0	2-7-1
11/13/2009	St. Lawrence University	7 p.m.	Draw, 2-2	2-7-2
11/14/2009	Clarkson University	4 p.m.	Loss, 1-4	2-8-2
11/20/2009	Quinnipiac University	7 p.m.	Draw, 1-1	2-8-3
11/21/2009	Princeton University	4 p.m.	Loss, 2-3	2-9-3
11/24/2009	Syracuse University	7 p.m.	Win, 5-4	3-9-3
11/27/2009	Mercyhurst College	7 p.m.	Loss, 3-8	3-10-3
11/28/2009	Mercyhurst College	2 p.m.	Loss, 2-8	3-11-3
12/4/2009	Brown University	7 p.m.	Win, 4-2	4-11-3
12/5/2009	Yale University	4 p.m.	Loss, 0-3	4-12-3
1/2/2010	Syracuse University	7 p.m.	Win, 5-4	5-12-3
1/8/2010	Niagara University	7 p.m.	Loss, 2-7	5-13-3
1/9/2010	Niagara University	4 p.m.	Win, 5-3	6-13-3
1/15/2010	Dartmouth College	7 p.m.	Win, 6-4	7-13-3
1/16/2010	Harvard University	4 p.m.	Loss, 1-5	7-14-3
1/22/2010	Cornell University	3 p.m.	Draw, 3-3	7-14-4
1/23/2010	Cornell University	3 p.m.	Loss, 0-6	7-15-4
1/29/2010	Clarkson University	7 p.m.	Loss, 0-3	7-16-4
1/30/2010	St. Lawrence University	4 p.m.	Win, 2-1	8-16-4
2/5/2010	Princeton University	7 p.m.	Win, 4-3	9-16-4
2/6/2010	Quinnipiac University	4 p.m.	Loss, 1-2	9-17-4
2/12/2010	Yale University	7 p.m.	Loss, 1-3	9-18-4
2/13/2010	Brown University	4 p.m.	Win, 4-3	10-18-4
2/19/2010	Union College	7 p.m.	Win, 2-1	11-18-4
2/20/2010	Rensselaer	4 p.m.	Win, 3-2	12-18-4

=== Conference Tournament ===
Date	Opponent	Time	Score	Record
2/26/2010	Cornell	3:30 p.m.	Loss, 1-2	12-19-4
2/27/2010	Cornell	2 p.m.	Loss, 0-5	12-20-4

== Player stats ==
= Indicates team leader

=== Skaters ===
Player	Games	Goals	Assists	Points	Points/game	PIM	GWG	PPG	SHG
Katie Stewart	36	24	15	39	1.0833	14	3	7	1
Evan Minnick	36	10	15	25	0.6944	39	1	4	0
Brittany Phillips	36	11	9	20	0.5556	64	3	3	0
Marissa Dombovy	36	6	11	17	0.4722	22	2	3	0
Hannah Milan	36	4	12	16	0.4444	22	1	3	0
Jessi Waters	36	2	14	16	0.4444	18	1	1	0
Jordan Brickner	34	6	9	15	0.4412	2	0	2	0
Beth Rotenberg	36	7	7	14	0.3889	12	1	3	0
Ali Edell	36	3	11	14	0.3889	52	0	0	0
Jenna Klynstra	36	4	9	13	0.3611	22	0	3	0
Jacquie Colborne	35	3	4	7	0.2000	22	0	0	0
Amanda Kirwan	34	2	4	6	0.1765	4	0	0	0
Whitney Routman	36	0	4	4	0.1111	2	0	0	0
Krista Dermott	33	2	1	3	0.0909	6	0	1	0
Heidi Peterson	36	1	2	3	0.0833	4	0	0	0
Nicole McDonald	35	0	3	3	0.0857	0	0	0	0
Jessica Hootz	36	1	0	1	0.0278	14	0	0	0
Kristi-Lyn Pollock	36	0	1	1	0.0278	30	0	0	0
Kimberly Sass	12	0	1	1	0.0833	0	0	0	0
Jocelyn Yokow	1	0	0	0	0.0000	0	0	0	0
Lisa Plenderleith	27	0	0	0	0.0000	10	0	0	0

=== Goaltenders ===
Player	Games Played	Minutes	Goals Against	Wins	Losses	Ties	Shutouts	Save %	Goals Against Average
Erin Callahan									
Jackee Snikeris									

== Awards and honors ==
- Katie Stewart, ECAC Player of the Week (Week of February 15, 2010)
