= 2009–10 Quinnipiac Bobcats women's ice hockey season =

- Conference: ECAC

Rankings
- USA Today/USA Hockey Magazine: Not ranked
- USCHO.com/CBS College Sports: Not ranked

Record
- Overall: 19–10–8

Coaches and captains
- Head coach: Rick Seeley

The Quinnipiac Bobcats women's ice hockey team represented Quinnipiac University in the 2009–10 NCAA Division I women's ice hockey season. The Bobcats were the most improved team in the NCAA. At season's end, the squad had won 19 contests, a 16 win improvement compared to the 2008–09 season, when Quinnipiac won only 3 games. The Bobcats set a school record with conference wins (11), and hosted a postseason game for the first time in the program's history.

== Offseason ==
- April 16: The Quinnipiac University women's ice hockey program has teamed up with the Holiday Inn in North Haven, Conn., to benefit the Ronald McDonald House. The women's ice hockey team will also donate, prepare and cook a monthly meal for guests of the Ronald McDonald House and participate in its annual spring cleaning.

- April 17: Quinnipiac University and USA Hockey today announced that the Qwest Tour, featuring the 2009–10 U.S. Women's National Team, will come to the TD Banknorth Sports Center on January 3, 2010 when Team USA plays the ECAC Hockey All-Stars at 2 p.m.
- May 12: Junior assistant captain Kallie Flor (Farmington, Minn.) was named captain of the Quinnipiac University women's ice hockey team for the 2009–10 season at the Women's Ice Hockey Awards Banquet. Fellow junior Evelina Husar (Eskilstuna, Sweden) was appointed assistant captain for the second consecutive season. Junior Janine Duffy (Toronto, Ontario) was named the team's Most Valuable Player at the banquet, while senior Trudy Reyns (Port Hope, Ontario) was awarded the Defensive Player of the Year, and freshman Chelsea Illchuk (Lockhart, Manitoba) took home the Rookie of the Year accolade. Team trainer Jennifer Skelley was also recognized, earning the Coaches Award.
- May 13: Nine members of the Quinnipiac University women's ice hockey team volunteered their time at the March of Dimes New Haven March for Babies walk on April 26. The march took place at Lighthouse Point Park in New Haven.

== Regular season ==
- The Bobcats will compete in the Nutmeg Classic.
- Jan. 15–16: In the sweep of then No. 10 ranked Syracuse Orange women's ice hockey program, Kallie Flor scored back-to-back, game-winning goals. This included the first overtime game winner for Quinnipiac since November 29, 2006.
- Feb. 19: With a 1–0 defeat of Yale, Victoria Vigilanit registered her fifth shutout of the year
- Feb 20: Vigilanti allowed just one goal on 31 shots, as the Bobcats defeated Brown 8–1. Vigilanti would get her 17th victory and the 11th victory in the conference.
- March 5: Bobcats head coach Rick Seeley was selected as ECAC Coach of the Year. Under his tutelage, the Bobcats had their most successful season to date. In their nine-year history, it was their best overall and best conference record. The school had a 19–10–8 regular season record, while their conference mark was 11–4–7.
- March 6: Freshman goalie Victoria Vigilanti was named ECAC Hockey Goaltender of the Year. She was the first Quinnipiac student-athlete to win the award. Of note, she appeared in all 22 conference games and posted a win–loss record of 11–4–7.

=== Schedule ===
2009–10 Eastern College Athletic Conference standings
	Conference							Overall					
	GP	W	L	T	PTS	GF	GA	GP	W	L	T	GF	GA
Cornell	22	14	2	6	34	67	26	36	21	9	6	103	63
Clarkson	22	14	5	3	31	47	28	40	23	12	5	104	69
Harvard	22	13	6	3	29	69	40	33	20	8	5	94	54
Quinnipiac	22	11	4	7	29	44	28	37	19	10	8	79	51
Rensselaer	22	11	7	4	26	56	42	37	16	15	6	87	77
Princeton	22	11	7	4	26	52	42	31	13	14	4	72	70
St. Lawrence	22	11	8	3	25	50	41	37	16	14	7	88	85
Colgate	22	8	10	4	20	51	68	36	12	20	4	86	129
Dartmouth	22	9	12	1	19	70	60	28	12	14	2	90	78
Yale	22	8	13	1	17	36	55	29	10	16	3	56	75
Brown	22	1	18	3	5	22	73	28	3	21	4	41	95
Union	22	1	20	1	3	14	75	34	5	28	1	36	110

= Qualified for NCAA Frozen Four	= Qualified for NCAA Tournament

=== Schedule ===
Date	Opponent	Location	Time	Score	Record
Sat, Oct 3	Sacred Heart	TD Banknorth Sports Center – Hamden, Conn.	2:00 p.m.	4–1	1–0–0
Sun, Oct 4	University of New Hampshire	at Whittemore Center – Durham, N.H.	2:00 p.m.	0–4	1–1–0
Fri, Oct 16	Boston College	at Conte Forum – Chestnut Hill, Mass.	7:00 p.m.	1–1	1–1–1
Sat, Oct 17	Northeastern	at Matthews Arena – Boston, Mass.	2:00 p.m.	1–0	2–1–1
Fri, Oct 23	Niagara	TD Banknorth Sports Center – Hamden, Conn.	7:00 p.m.		
Sat, Oct 24	Niagara	TD Banknorth Sports Center – Hamden, Conn.	4:00 p.m.		
Fri, Oct 30	Union *	TD Banknorth Sports Center – Hamden, Conn.	7:00 p.m.	3–0	
Sat, Oct 31	Rensselaer Polytechnic Institute *	TD Banknorth Sports Center – Hamden, Conn.	4:00 p.m.		
Fri, Nov 6	Brown *	at Meehan Auditorium – Providence, R.I.	7:00 p.m.		
Sat, Nov 7	Yale *	at Ingalls Rink – New Haven, Conn.	4:00 p.m.		
Fri, Nov 13	Harvard *	at Bright Hockey Center – Cambridge, Mass.	7:00 p.m.		
Sat, Nov 14	Dartmouth *	at Thompson Arena – Hanover, N.H.	4:00 p.m.		
Fri, Nov 20	Colgate *	TD Banknorth Sports Center – Hamden, Conn.	7:00 p.m.		
Sat, Nov 21	Cornell *	TD Banknorth Sports Center – Hamden, Conn.	4:00 p.m.		
Fri, Nov 27	University of Connecticut	at Ingalls Rink – New Haven, Conn.	7:00 p.m.		
Sat, Nov 28	Yale/Sacred Heart	at Ingalls Rink – New Haven, Conn.	7:00 p.m.		
Fri, Dec 4	Clarkson *	at Cheel Arena – Potsdam, N.Y.	3:30 p.m.		
Sat, Dec 5	St. Lawrence *	at Appleton Arena – Canton, N.Y.	2:00 p.m.		
Thu, Dec 31	Princeton *	TD Banknorth Sports Center – Hamden, Conn.	12:00 p.m.		
Sat, Jan 2	Princeton *	at Baker Rink – Princeton, N.J.	1:00 p.m.		
Sun, Jan 3	USA Women's Olympic Team vs. ECAC Hockey All-Stars	at TD Banknorth Sports Center – Hamden, Conn.	2:00 p.m.		
Fri, Jan 8	Dartmouth *	TD Banknorth Sports Center – Hamden, Conn.	3:00 p.m.		
Sat, Jan 9	Harvard *	TD Banknorth Sports Center – Hamden, Conn.	4:00 p.m.		
Fri, Jan 15	Syracuse	at Tennity Ice Pavilion – Syracuse, N.Y.	7:00 p.m.		
Sat, Jan 16	Syracuse	at Tennity Ice Pavilion – Syracuse, N.Y.	2:00 p.m.		
Fri, Jan 22	Wayne State	TD Banknorth Sports Center – Hamden, Conn.	4:00 p.m.		
Sat, Jan 23	Wayne State	TD Banknorth Sports Center – Hamden, Conn.	4:00 p.m.		
Fri, Jan 29	Rensselaer Polytechnic Institute *	at Houston Field House – Troy, N.Y.	7:00 p.m.		
Sat, Jan 30	Union *	at Messa Rink – Schenectady, N.Y.	4:00 p.m.	3–1	
Fri, Feb 5	Cornell *	at Lynah Rink – Ithaca, N.Y.	7:00 p.m.		
Sat, Feb 6	Colgate *	at Starr Rink – Hamilton, N.Y.	4:00 p.m.		
Fri, Feb 12	St. Lawrence *	TD Banknorth Sports Center – Hamden, Conn.	7:00 p.m.		
Sat, Feb 13	Clarkson *	TD Banknorth Sports Center – Hamden, Conn.	4:00 p.m.		
Fri, Feb 19	Yale *	TD Banknorth Sports Center – Hamden, Conn.	7:00 p.m.		
Sat, Feb 20	Brown *	TD Banknorth Sports Center – Hamden, Conn.	4:00 p.m.		
Fri, Feb 26	ECAC Quarterfinals *	at Highest Seed	7:00 p.m.		

== Player stats ==
=== Skaters ===
Player	Games	Goals	Assists	Points	Points/game	PIM	GWG	PPG	SHG
Heather Hughes	36	14	11	25	0.6944	26	4	6	0
Janine Duffy	37	11	14	25	0.6757	30	1	2	0
Kallie Flor	37	14	8	22	0.5946	20	3	4	1
Bethany Dymarcyzk	37	7	10	17	0.4595	24	2	2	0
Kate Wheeler	37	4	10	14	0.3784	10	1	0	0
Kristen Eklund	34	6	5 11	0.3235	6	1	0	0	
Kelley Davies	37	5	6	11	0.2973	10	2	1	0
Regan Boulton	37	1	9	10	0.2703	8	0	1	0
Brittany Lyons	32	4	5	9	0.2813	12	1	0	0
Jordan Elkins	36	1	8	9	0.2500	28	0	1	0
Breehan Polci	37	2	6	8	0.2162	6	0	0	0
Felica Vieweg	37	2	5	7	0.1892	20	1	0	0
Chelsea Illchuk	37	3	3	6	0.1622	0	1	1	0
Evelina Husar	37	2	4	6	0.1622	4	1	0	0
Stacey Kmill	34	1	4	5	0.1471	17	0	0	1
Melissa Perry	36	1	3	4	0.1111	10	0	0	0
Breana Burton	21	1	2	3	0.1429	0	1	1	0
Breann Julius	28	0	1	1	0.0357 2	0	0	0	
Cate Colucci	1	0	0	0	0.0000	0	0	0	0
Kerry Wilson	14	0	0	0	0.0000 4	0	0	0	
Amanda Nagel	4	0	0	0	0.0000	0	0	0	0
Kelsey Britton	2	0	0	0	0.0000	0	0	0	0
Victoria Vigilanti	34	0	0	0	0.0000	0	0	0	0
Jessica Puig	1	0	0	0	0.0000	0	0	0	0

== Postseason ==
- On February 28, Quinnipiac made NCAA history. Against the Rensselaer Engineers, the Bobcats lost by a score of 2–1, but it took five overtimes. It is now the longest college hockey game in NCAA history. Senior defenseman Laura Gersten had the game-winning goal. She registered it at 4:32 of the fifth overtime session to not only clinch the win, but the series victory. RPI advanced to the ECAC Hockey Women's Semifinals for the second consecutive season. The Engineers will face top ranked Cornell University.

== Awards and honors ==
- Heather Hughes, ECAC Rookie of the Week (Week of November 9)
- Heather Hughes, ECAC All-Rookie Team
- Rick Seeley, ECAC Coach of the Year
- Rick Seeley, New England Hockey Writers All-Star Team (Coach)
- Victoria Vigilanti, ECAC Defensive Player of the Week (Week of October 19)
- Victoria Vigilanti, ECAC Defensive Player of the Week (Week of February 22)
- Victoria Vigilanti, ECAC Leader, Save percentage (.957)
- Victoria Vigilanti, Ranked second, Goals against average (1.15)
- Victoria Vigilanti, ECAC All-Rookie Team
- Victoria Vigilanti, All-ECAC First Team
- Victoria Vigilanti, ECAC Goaltender of the Year
- Victoria Vigilanti, New England Hockey Writers All-Star Team
- Hughes and Vigilanti made school history. It marks the first time in women's hockey history at the school that two players both received postseason honours in the same year. In addition, it marked the first time since the 2006–07 season that a player from the Bobcats received a postseason honour.

=== Team Awards ===
- Kallie Flor, 2010 Most Valuable Player
- Kelsey Britton, 2010 Coaches Award
- Jordan Elkins, 2010 Top Defensive Player
- Victoria Vigilanti, 2010 Rookie of the Year
