= 2009–10 St. Lawrence Skating Saints women's ice hockey season =

2009–10 St. Lawrence Saints women's ice hockey season
- Conference: ECAC
- Home ice: Appleton Arena

Record
- Overall: 16-14-7

Coaches and captains
- Head coach: Chris Wells
- Assistant coaches: Ted Wisner; Mare MacDougall
- Captain: Tara Akstull
- Alternate captain(s): Courtney Sawchuk, Britni Smith and Brittony Chartier

The 2009–10 St. Lawrence Saints women's hockey team represented St. Lawrence University in the 2009–10 NCAA Division I women's hockey season. The Saints were coached by Chris Wells and play their home games at Appleton Arena. The Big Red were a member of the Eastern College Athletic Conference and were unable to win the NCAA Women's Ice Hockey Championship

== Offseason ==
- April 21: Captains for the 2009–10 season have been appointed. Tara Akstull will be the Captain for the upcoming season. Courtney Sawchuk, Britni Smith and Brittony Chartier will each serve as assistant captains.
- June 11: The Saints have added five players for the upcoming season. The five members of the Class of 2009 totaled 515 points in their time with the Saints. Kelly Sabatine, Kayla Sullivan, Jamie Goldsmith and Michelle Ng are the four new forwards that will comprise the class of 2013. Brooke Fernandez will join the incoming class on defence.
- August 17: St. Lawrence senior defenseman Britni Smith, junior forward Karell Emard and former St. Lawrence standout Annie Guay have been named to Canada's National Under-22 Team
- September 22:St. Lawrence, which has finished among the top three teams in the regular-season standings each year since 2000–01, has been selected to finish in first place in the ECAC in the preseason poll. The voting was done by the league coaches as part of the pre-season polls and all-league team. The Saints, garnered a total of 107 points, including three of 12 first-place votes. St. Lawrence, boasts returning all-league selection senior defender Britni Smith. Last season, the team finished second in the regular-season standings with a mark of 16-5-1.

== Exhibition ==
Date	Opponent	Location	Score
October 3	McGill	Appleton Arena	2-1

== Regular season ==
- October 5: The St Lawrence women's hockey team was ranked No. 5 in the country. The USCHO.com officials revealed it in their first Top-10 Women's Hockey Poll of the season. St. Lawrence accumulated 71 points.
- November 7: The 10th-ranked Harvard women's ice hockey team had a 3-0 shutout victory over No. 7 St. Lawrence at Bright Hockey Center. It was a historic match as the Crimson earned the program's 500th victory.
- February 17: Britni Smith of St. Lawrence Univ. is among 45 nominees for the Patty Kazmaier Memorial Award.
- Feb. 25: St. Lawrence University alumna Gina Kingsbury won her second Olympic gold medal as Canada's women's hockey team defeated the United States 2-0 in Vancouver.

=== Standings ===
2009–10 Eastern College Athletic Conference standings
	Conference							Overall					
	GP	W	L	T	PTS	GF	GA	GP	W	L	T	GF	GA
Cornell	22	14	2	6	34	67	26	36	21	9	6	103	63
Clarkson	22	14	5	3	31	47	28	40	23	12	5	104	69
Harvard	22	13	6	3	29	69	40	33	20	8	5	94	54
Quinnipiac	22	11	4	7	29	44	28	37	19	10	8	79	51
Rensselaer	22	11	7	4	26	56	42	37	16	15	6	87	77
Princeton	22	11	7	4	26	52	42	31	13	14	4	72	70
St. Lawrence	22	11	8	3	25	50	41	37	16	14	7	88	85
Colgate	22	8	10	4	20	51	68	36	12	20	4	86	129
Dartmouth	22	9	12	1	19	70	60	28	12	14	2	90	78
Yale	22	8	13	1	17	36	55	29	10	16	3	56	75
Brown	22	1	18	3	5	22	73	28	3	21	4	41	95
Union	22	1	20	1	3	14	75	34	5	28	1	36	110

= Qualified for NCAA Frozen Four	= Qualified for NCAA Tournament

=== Roster ===
Number	Name	Position	Class	Height	Shoots
4	Josee Belanger	D	So.	5-7	R
5	Becky Street	D	Sr.	5-5	R
6	Kirsten Roach	F	Jr.	5-10	R
7	Tara Akstull	F	Sr.	5-7	R
8	Michelle Zimmerman	D	Jr.	5-9	R
9	Alley Bero	F	So.	5-5	R
14	Vanessa Emond	F	So.	5-4	L
15	Karlee Shields	F	Sr.	5-5	L
17	Courtney Sawchuk	D	Sr.	5-5	L
18	Britni Smith	D	Sr.	5-9	R
21	Kyrsten Venasse	F	Jr.	5-6	R
25	Maxie Weisz	G	Sr.	5-8	Catches L
33	Brittony Chartier	G	Sr.	5-11	Catches L
35	Nikki Bongaerts	G	Jr.	5-3	Catches L
76	Karell Emard	F	Jr.	5-7	L

=== Schedule ===
Date	Opponent	Location	Score	Record
Fri, 10/09/2009	7:00 pm	Connecticut	Loss, 2-0	0-1-0
Sat, 10/10/2009	3:00 pm	Providence	Tie, 3-3	0-1-1
Fri, 10/16/2009	7:00 pm	Robert Morris	Win, 3-2	1-1-1
Sat, 10/17/2009	4:00 pm	Robert Morris	Win, 6-3	2-1-1
Fri, 10/23/2009	7:00 pm	Boston University	Tie, 2-2	2-1-2
Sat, 10/24/2009	3:00 pm	New Hampshire	Tie, 3-3	2-1-3
Tue, 10/27/2009	7:00 pm	Clarkson	Loss, 1-4	2-2-3
Fri, 10/30/2009	4:00 pm	Yale	Win, 4-0	3-2-3
Sat, 10/31/2009	3:00 pm	Brown	Win, 3-1	4-2-3
Fri, 11/06/2009	7:00 pm	Dartmouth	n/a	
Sat, 11/07/2009	4:00 pm	Harvard	n/a	
Fri, 11/13/2009	7:00 pm	Colgate	n/a	
Sat, 11/14/2009	4:00 pm	Cornell	n/a	
Fri, 11/20/2009	7:07 pm	Ohio State	n/a	
Sat, 11/21/2009	2:07 pm	Ohio State	n/a	
Fri, 12/04/2009	3:30 pm	Princeton	n/a	
Sat, 12/05/2009	2:00 pm	Quinnipiac	n/a	
Fri, 12/11/2009	7:00 pm	Mercyhurst	n/a	
Sat, 12/12/2009	3:00 pm	Mercyhurst	n/a	
Fri, 01/08/2010	7:00 pm	Rensselaer	n/a	
Sat, 01/09/2010	4:00 pm	Union	n/a	3-1
Thu, 01/14/2010	7:00 pm	Boston College	n/a	
Fri, 01/15/2010	2:00 pm	Boston College	n/a	
Fri, 01/22/2010	7:00 pm	Brown	n/a	
Sat, 01/23/2010	4:00 pm	Yale	n/a	
Fri, 01/29/2010	7:00 pm	Cornell	n/a	
Sat, 01/30/2010	4:00 pm	Colgate	n/a	
Tue, 02/02/2010	7:00 pm	Clarkson	n/a	
Fri, 02/05/2010	7:00 pm	Union	7:00 pm	5-0
Sat, 02/06/2010	4:00 pm	Rensselaer	n/a	
Fri, 02/12/2010	7:00 pm	Quinnipiac	n/a	
Sat, 02/13/2010	4:00 pm	Princeton	n/a	
Fri, 02/19/2010	7:00 pm	Harvard	n/a	
Sat, 02/20/2010	4:00 pm	Dartmouth	n/a	

=== Game Highs ===
Metric	Number	Opponent	Date
Goals	6	at Robert Morris (W, 6-3)	10.17.09
Goals Allowed	6	vs. Mercyhurst (L, 6-2)	12.12.09
Goals in a Period	4 (3rd period)	at Robert Morris	10.17.09
Goals Allowed in a Period	4 (3rd period)	vs. Mercyhurst,	12.12.09
Shots	47	at Brown (W, 3-2),	01.22.10
Shots Allowed	44	vs. Mercyhurst (L, 6-2)	12.12.09
Penalties	10	at Dartmouth (L, 4-2)	11.06.09
PIM	20	at Dartmouth (L, 4-2)	11.06.09
PP Goals	3	vs. Yale (W, 4-0)	10.30.09
PP Goals	3	vs. Brown (W, 3-1)	10.31.09
PP Goals	3	at Union (W, 3-1)	01.09.10
PP %	1.00 (1-of-1)	vs. Dartmouth	02.20.10
PPGs Allowed	2	vs. New Hampshire	10.24.09
PPGs Allowed	2	at Dartmouth	11.06.09
PPGs Allowed	2	vs. Mercyhurst	12.12.09
PP Allowed %	.667 (2-of-3)	vs. New Hampshire (T, 3-3)	10.24.09
PP Allowed %	.667 (2-of-3)	vs. Mercyhurst (L, 6-2)	12.12.09
PP Allowed %	.667 (2-of-3)	at Princeton (L, 3-0)	02.13.10
SH goals	2	at Dartmouth (L, 4-2)	11.06.09
SHGs Allowed	1 at Clarkson (L, 4-1)	10.27.09	

== Player stats ==
= Indicates team leader

=== Skaters ===
Player	Games	Goals	Assists	Points	Points/game	PIM	GWG	PPG	SHG
Vanessa Emond	37	17	16	33	0.8919	22	2	2	3
Britni Smith	35	8	17	25	0.7143	10	1	5	2
Kelly Sabatine	36	9	15	24	0.6667	20	1	2	1
Michelle Ng	37	9	11	20	0.5405	4	1	3	0
Alley Bero	37	8	12	20	0.5405	12	1	4	0
Kayla Sullivan	36	12	5	17	0.4722	18	3	5	0
Tara Akstull	37	7	10	17	0.4595	14	2	3	0
Courtney Sawchuk	35	0	9	9	0.2571	24	0	0	0
Jamie Goldsmith	35	6	2	8	0.2286	28	2	2	0
Michelle Zimmerman	33	4	3	7	0.2121	6	2	0	1
Brooke Fernandez	37	2	5	7	0.1892	36	0	1	0
Kirsten Roach	22	3	1	4	0.1818	12	0	0	0
Karlee Shields	37	2	1	3	0.0811	0	1	0	0
Lauren Brozowski	37	1	2	3	0.0811	16	0	0	0
Josee Belanger	35	0	2	2	0.0571	6	0	0	0
Karell Emard	7	0	1	1	0.1429	12	0	0	0
Becky Street	34	0	1	1	0.0294	0	0	0	0
Ashley Scott	37	0	1	1	0.0270	0	0	0	0
Nikki Bongaerts	4	0	0	0	0.0000	0	0	0	0
Maxie Weisz	19	0	0	0	0.0000	0	0	0	0
Brittony Chartier	30	0	0	0	0.0000	4	0	0	0
Kyrsten Venasse	29	0	0	0	0.0000	0	0	0	0

=== Goaltenders ===
Player	Games Played	Minutes	Goals Against	Wins	Losses	Ties	Shutouts	Save %	Goals Against Average
Maxie Weisz									
Brittony Chartier									
Nikki Bongaerts									

=== Multiple-Point Games ===
- Vanessa Emond, Britni Smith (9)
- Kelly Sabatine (5)
- Alley Bero, Michelle Ng (3)
- Tara Akstull, Kayla Sullivan (2)
- K. Shields, C. Sawchuk (1)

== Awards and honors ==
- Britni Smith, Pre-Season All-ECAC Team
- Brittony Chartier, Frozen Four Skills Competition participant
- Jamie Goldsmith, ECAC Rookie of the Week (Week of October 12)
- Kelly Sabatine, ECAC Rookie of the Week (Week of October 19)
- Britni Smith, Frozen Four Skills Competition participant
- Kayla Sullivan, ECAC Rookie of the Week (Week of October 26)

== See also ==
- St. Lawrence Saints women's ice hockey
- 2009–10 NCAA Division I women's ice hockey season
- 2010–11 St. Lawrence Saints women's ice hockey season
