= 2009–10 NCAA Division I women's ice hockey season =

- Regular season: October 2, 2009 – February 2010
- NCAA tournament: 2010
- Tournament dates: February 26, 2010–March 21, 2010
- National championship: Ridder Arena; Minneapolis, Minnesota
- NCAA champion: Minnesota Duluth Bulldogs
- Patty Kazmaier Award: Vicki Bendus ()

The 2009–10 NCAA Division I women's ice hockey season began on October 2, 2009, ending with the 2010 NCAA Division I Women's Ice Hockey Tournament's championship game on March 21, 2010, at Ridder Arena in Minneapolis. It marked the third time that Minneapolis had hosted the Frozen Four. The tournament's opening round was scheduled for Friday, February 26, 2010, followed by the Final Faceoff on Saturday through Sunday, March 6–7, 2010. The quarterfinals were played on Friday through Saturday, March 12–13, 2010, with the Frozen Four played on Friday and Saturday, March 19 and 20, 2010.

== Season outlook ==
=== Pre-season polls ===
- September 17: The Mercyhurst College women's hockey team was predicted to finish first in the College Hockey America Preseason Coaches' Poll. The poll was released by CHA league officials. Mercyhurst claimed four of five possible first-place votes and 16 points to earn the top ranking for the eighth-straight season. Robert Morris came in second with 14 points after finishing with a 5–9–2 mark in conference play a season ago. Wayne State was slated third with nine points, and Syracuse landed at No. 4 with eight points. Niagara was ranked No. 5 with five points.
- September 22:St. Lawrence was selected to finish in first place in the ECAC in the preseason poll. The voting was done by the league coaches as part of the pre-season polls and all-league team. The Saints garnered a total of 107 points, including three of 12 first-place votes. St. Lawrence boasted returning all-league selection senior defender Britni Smith. Last season, the team finished second in the regular-season standings with a mark of 16–5–1.
- September 24: The Badgers were the preseason pick to win the Western Collegiate Hockey Association women's title, according to a poll of league coaches. Wisconsin went 34–2–5 in the previous season en route to its third NCAA title in four years. The Badgers collected six first-place votes and 48 points in a poll of the eight coaches. Defending WCHA champion Minnesota placed second with 43 points and two first-place votes. Minnesota Duluth, with 38 points, was selected to finish third. All three of those teams qualified for the NCAA Frozen Four last season.

== Exhibition ==
=== CIS Exhibition ===
Throughout the season, various NCAA schools played Canadian Interuniversity Sport hockey teams in exhibition games.

Date	Location	NCAA school	CIS team	Score
Fri. Sept 25	Detroit	Wayne State	York	Wayne State, 3–2
Fri. Sept 25	Grand Forks, N.D.	North Dakota	Manitoba	North Dakota, 3–1
Sat. Sept 26	Erie, Pa.	Mercyhurst	Guelph	Mercyhurst, 10–0
Sat. Sept 26	Columbus, OH	Ohio State	Wilfrid Laurier	Tie, 1–1 (Ohio State scores in shootout)
Sat. Sept 26	Grand Forks, N.D.	North Dakota	Manitoba	Manitoba, 3–2
Sun. Sept 27	Matthews Arena	Northeastern	McGill	McGill, 3–1
Sun, Sep 27	Pittsburgh, Pa.	Robert Morris	Wilfrid Laurier	RMU, 4–0
Sun. Sept 27	Tennity Ice Pavilion	Syracuse	Guelph	Guelph, 3–1
Sun. Sep 27		Niagara	Brock University	Niagara, 5–2
Sat. Oct 3	Appleton Arena	St. Lawrence	McGill	
Sun. Oct 4	Burlington, VT	Vermont	McGill	McGill, 2–1
Fri. Oct 23	Hanover, N.H.	Dartmouth	McGill	St. Lawrence, 2–1
Sun. Oct 25	New Haven, CT	Yale	McGill	Yale, 4–2
Sat. Jan 2	Orono, Maine	Maine	University of Moncton	Maine, 4–2
Sun. Jan 3	Orono, Maine	Maine	University of Moncton	Maine, 6–3

=== Canadian semipro exhibition ===
Throughout the season, various NCAA schools played semipro Canadian teams in exhibition games.

Date	Location	NCAA school	Canadian team	Score
September 25, 2009	Erie, Pa.	Mercyhurst	Vaughan Flames	Mercyhurst, 10–0
September 26, 2009	Cheel Arena	Clarkson	Ottawa Senators (PWHL)	Clarkson, 7–3
October 18, 2009	Lynah Rink	Cornell Big Red	Toronto Aeros	5–5
November 21, 2009	Grand Forks, N.D.	North Dakota	Manitoba Maple Leafs	

=== US Olympic exhibition games ===
Throughout the season, various NCAA schools played the United States Olympic Hockey team.

Date	Location	NCAA school	Score
September 25	Xcel Energy Center	WCHA All-Stars	USA, 6–1
September 26	National Hockey Center	St. Cloud State	USA, 13–0
October 10	Grand Forks, N.D.	North Dakota	USA, 11–1
November 22	Whittemore Center	Hockey East women's All-Stars	
January 5	Madison, WI	Wisconsin	
January 12	Ridder Arena	Minnesota	

== Regular season ==
- November 7: The 10th-ranked Harvard women's ice hockey team had a 3–0 shutout victory over No. 7 St. Lawrence at Bright Hockey Center. The Crimson earned the program's 500th victory.

=== Standings ===
2009–10 College Hockey America standings
	Overall							Conference					
	GP	W	L	T	PTS	GF	GA	GP	W	L	T	GF	GA
x, y: Mercyhurst	23	19	1	3	41	0	0	7	6	0	1	0	0
Syracuse	26	13	12	1	27	0	0	8	4	4	0	0	0
Wayne State	22	8	11	3	19	0	0	8	4	4	0	0	0
Niagara	22	8	10	4	20	0	0	8	3	3	2	0	0
Robert Morris	25	7	17	1	15	0	0	7	0	6	1	0	0

x: Regular season champion, y: Postseason champion

2009–10 Eastern College Athletic Conference standings
	Conference							Overall					
	GP	W	L	T	PTS	GF	GA	GP	W	L	T	GF	GA
Cornell	22	14	2	6	34	67	26	36	21	9	6	103	63
Clarkson	22	14	5	3	31	47	28	40	23	12	5	104	69
Harvard	22	13	6	3	29	69	40	33	20	8	5	94	54
Quinnipiac	22	11	4	7	29	44	28	37	19	10	8	79	51
Rensselaer	22	11	7	4	26	56	42	37	16	15	6	87	77
Princeton	22	11	7	4	26	52	42	31	13	14	4	72	70
St. Lawrence	22	11	8	3	25	50	41	37	16	14	7	88	85
Colgate	22	8	10	4	20	51	68	36	12	20	4	86	129
Dartmouth	22	9	12	1	19	70	60	28	12	14	2	90	78
Yale	22	8	13	1	17	36	55	29	10	16	3	56	75
Brown	22	1	18	3	5	22	73	28	3	21	4	41	95
Union	22	1	20	1	3	14	75	34	5	28	1	36	110

= Qualified for NCAA Frozen Four	= Qualified for NCAA Tournament

2009–10 Hockey East Association standings
	Conference								Overall					
	GP	W	L	T	SOW	PTS	GF	GA	GP	W	L	T	GF	GA
Providence	21	11	5	5	3	30	59	44	34	15	10	9	91	76
New Hampshire	21	13	6	2	0	28	65	41	31	19	7	5	98	60
Boston University	21	10	6	5	3	28	54	41	34	14	8	12	93	80
Northeastern	21	9	6	6	4	28	45	34	32	17	8	7	77	47
Connecticut	21	10	5	6	1	27	46	33	34	19	8	7	87	57
Boston College	21	7	10	4	4	22	41	54	34	8	16	10	63	97
Vermont	21	5	15	1	0	11	26	55	33	10	22	1	52	90
Maine	21	3	15	3	1	10	24	58	31	6	20	5	63	85

2009–10 Western Collegiate Hockey Association standings
	Conference								Overall					
	GP	W	L	T	SOW	PTS	GF	GA	GP	W	L	T	GF	GA
Minnesota Duluth†*	28	20	6	2	1	43	90	55	41	31	8	2	138	83
Minnesota†	28	18	6	4	3	43	91	49	40	26	9	5	129	74
St. Cloud State	28	11	11	6	4	32	70	77	37	15	14	8	96	103
Wisconsin	28	15	12	1	0	31	84	63	36	18	15	3	107	82
Ohio State	28	12	13	3	1	28	90	94	37	17	15	5	122	117
Bemidji State	28	9	12	7	3	28	47	64	38	12	19	7	65	98
Minnesota State	28	5	18	5	3	18	49	92	34	7	22	5	66	117
North Dakota	28	7	19	2	0	16	44	71	34	8	22	4	61	92
Championship: † indicates conference regular season champion; * indicates conference tournament champion Updated July 21, 2024

=== Outdoor Games ===
- On Friday, January 8, 2010, Boston's Fenway Park played host to a Hockey East doubleheader. In the first game, New Hampshire faced off against Northeastern in an outdoor college hockey doubleheader in the first outdoor women's hockey game in the sport's history. Northeastern surged to a 2–0 lead, but New Hampshire rallied to win 5–3. The latter game featured the men's teams from Boston College and Boston University, in which BU won 3–2.
- The Wisconsin women's team hosted the Camp Randall Hockey Classic on February 6, 2010, at Camp Randall Stadium. The UW women's hockey program took on the Bemidji State Beavers outdoors at the stadium as part of their weekend series, while the men's program followed against the Michigan Wolverines in what would serve as the United States Hockey Hall of Fame Game.

=== Season tournaments ===
Name	Dates	Num. teams	Location	Championship
Nutmeg Classic	Nov. 27–28	4	New Haven, CT	Connecticut Huskies
Easton Holiday Classic	Jan. 2–3	4	St. Cloud, MN	No winner. Mercyhurst scored the most goals.
Women's Beanpot	Feb. 2–8	4	Boston, MA	Harvard

- Easton Holiday Classic

Date	Schools	Score
Jan 2	Minnesota State vs. Mercyhurst	Mercyhurst, 8–2
Jan 2	St. Cloud State vs. Providence	Tie, 4–4
Jan. 3	Minnesota State vs. Providence	Providence, 2–0
Jan. 3	St. Cloud State vs. Mercyhurst	Tie, 4–4

=== Rankings ===
==== October ====
USCHO.com/CBS College Sports
Ranking	Week of October 5	Week of October 12	Week of October 19	Week of October 26
1	Mercyhurst (140)	Mercyhurst (145)	Mercyhurst (10)	Mercyhurst (7)
2	Minnesota (139)	Minnesota (139)	Minnesota (5)	Minnesota (7)
3	New Hampshire (115)	New Hampshire (121)	New Hampshire	Clarkson
4	Wisconsin (112)	Clarkson (90)	Clarkson	New Hampshire
5	St. Lawrence (71)	Minnesota Duluth (87)	Wisconsin	Minnesota Duluth
6	Minnesota Duluth (63)	Wisconsin (62)	Minnesota Duluth	Dartmouth
7	Clarkson (53)	Dartmouth (55)	St. Lawrence	St. Lawrence
8	Dartmouth (40)	St. Lawrence (39)	Dartmouth	Wisconsin
9	Harvard (28)	Harvard (31)	Boston University	Harvard
10	Boston University (19)	Boston University (28)	Harvard	Boston University

USA Today/USA Hockey Poll
Ranking	Week of October 5	Week of October 12	Week of October 19	Week of October 26
1	Mercyhurst (16)	Mercyhurst (19)	Mercyhurst (17)	Mercyhurst (14)
2	Minnesota (2)	Minnesota	Minnesota (2)	Minnesota (5)
3	New Hampshire	New Hampshire	New Hampshire	Clarkson
4	Wisconsin (1)	Clarkson	Clarkson	New Hampshire
5	St. Lawrence	Minnesota Duluth	Wisconsin	Minnesota Duluth
6	Minnesota Duluth	Wisconsin	Dartmouth	St. Lawrence
7	Clarkson	Dartmouth	St. Lawrence	Dartmouth
8	Dartmouth	Harvard	Minnesota Duluth	Harvard
9	Harvard	Boston University	Boston University	Wisconsin
10	Boston University	St. Lawrence	Harvard	Boston University

==== November ====
USCHO.com/CBS College Sports
Ranking	Week of November 2	Week of November 9	Week of November 16	Week of November 23	Week of November 30
1	Mercyhurst (11)	Mercyhurst	Mercyhurst (15)	Mercyhurst	Mercyhurst (9)
2	Clarkson (3)	Clarkson	Minnesota	Minnesota	Minnesota
3	Minnesota (1)	Minnesota	Clarkson	Clarkson	New Hampshire
4	New Hampshire	New Hampshire	New Hampshire	New Hampshire	Clarkson
5	Minnesota Duluth	Minnesota Duluth	Minnesota Duluth	Minnesota Duluth	Minnesota Duluth
6	Wisconsin	Wisconsin	Wisconsin	Cornell	Cornell
7	Cornell	Cornell	Cornell	Wisconsin	Wisconsin
8	Boston University	Boston University	Boston University	Northeastern	Northeastern
9	Northeastern	Northeastern	Northeastern	Boston University	Harvard
10	Princeton	Princeton	Princeton	Boston University	Harvard

USA Today
Ranking	Week of November 2	Week of November 9	Week of November 16	Week of November 23	Week of November 30
1	Mercyhurst (16)	Mercyhurst (16)	Mercyhurst	Mercyhurst	Mercyhurst (12)
2	Clarkson (3)	Clarkson (3)		Minnesota	Minnesota (7)
3	New Hampshire	Minnesota		Clarkson	New Hampshire
4	Minnesota	New Hampshire		New Hampshire	Minnesota Duluth
5	Minnesota Duluth	Minnesota Duluth		Minnesota Duluth	Clarkson
6	Wisconsin	Wisconsin		Cornell	Wisconsin
7	St. Lawrence	Boston University		Northeastern	Cornell
8	Boston University	Harvard		Boston University	Northeastern
9	Northeastern	Princeton		Wisconsin	Harvard
10	Harvard	Cornell		Harvard	Boston University

==== December ====
USCHO.com/CBS College Sports
Ranking	Week of December 6	Week of December 13	Week of December 20	Week of December 27
1	Mercyhurst	Mercyhurst (15)	Mercyhurst	Mercyhurst
2	Minnesota	Minnesota	Minnesota	Minnesota
3	Clarkson	Clarkson	Clarkson	Clarkson
4	New Hampshire	New Hampshire	New Hampshire	New Hampshire
5	Minnesota Duluth	Harvard	Harvard	Harvard
6	Harvard	Wisconsin	Wisconsin	Wisconsin
7	Wisconsin	Minnesota Duluth	Minnesota Duluth	Minnesota Duluth
8	Cornell	Cornell	Cornell	Cornell
9	Northeastern	Northeastern	Northeastern	Northeastern
10	Boston University	Boston University	Boston University	Boston University

USA Today
Ranking	Week of December 6	Week of December 13	Week of December 20	Week of December 27
1	Mercyhurst	Mercyhurst (19)	Mercyhurst (19)	Mercyhurst (19)
2	Minnesota	Minnesota	Minnesota	Minnesota
3	Clarkson	New Hampshire	New Hampshire	New Hampshire
4	New Hampshire	Clarkson	Clarkson	Clarkson
5		Harvard	Harvard	Harvard
6	Wisconsin	Wisconsin	Wisconsin	Wisconsin
7	Harvard	Minnesota Duluth	Minnesota Duluth	Minnesota Duluth
8	Cornell	Cornell	Cornell	Cornell
9	Northeastern	Northeastern	Northeastern	Northeastern
10		Syracuse	Syracuse	Syracuse

==== January ====
USCHO.com/CBS College Sports
Ranking	Week of January 4	Week of January 11	Week of January 18	Week of January 25
1	Mercyhurst (13)	Mercyhurst (14)	Mercyhurst	Mercyhurst (14)
2	Minnesota (2)	Minnesota (1)	Minnesota	Minnesota (1)
3	Clarkson	New Hampshire	Clarkson	Clarkson
4	New Hampshire	Clarkson	New Hampshire	New Hampshire
5	Harvard	Wisconsin	Minnesota-Duluth	Minnesota-Duluth
6	Wisconsin	Harvard	Harvard	Northeastern
7	Minnesota-Duluth	Minnesota-Duluth	Wisconsin	Harvard
8	Cornell	Northeastern	Northeastern	Connecticut
9	Northeastern	Connecticut	Connecticut	Providence
10	Boston University and Ohio State	Syracuse	Providence	Wisconsin

USA Today
Ranking	Week of January 4	Week of January 11	Week of January 18	Week of January 25
1	Mercyhurst (19)	Mercyhurst (19)	Mercyhurst	Mercyhurst (19)
2	Minnesota	Minnesota	Minnesota	Minnesota
3	Clarkson	New Hampshire	Clarkson	Clarkson
4	New Hampshire	Clarkson	New Hampshire	Minnesota-Duluth
5	Harvard	Minnesota-Duluth	Minnesota-Duluth	New Hampshire
6	Wisconsin	Harvard	Harvard	Northeastern
7	Minnesota-Duluth	Wisconsin	Northeastern	Harvard
8	Cornell	Northeastern	Connecticut	Connecticut
9	Northeastern	Providence	Providence	Providence
10	Ohio State	Cornell	Wisconsin	Wisconsin

==== February ====
USCHO.com/CBS College Sports
Ranking	Week of February 1	Week of February 8	Week of February 15	Week of February 22
1	Minnesota (10)	Mercyhurst	Mercyhurst (15)	Mercyhurst (15)
2	Mercyhurst (5)	Minnesota	Minnesota	Minnesota-Duluth
3	Clarkson	Minnesota-Duluth	Minnesota-Duluth	Minnesota
4	New Hampshire	Clarkson	New Hampshire	Harvard
5	Minnesota Duluth	Harvard	Harvard	New Hampshire
6	Harvard	New Hampshire	Clarkson	Clarkson
7	Northeastern	Connecticut	Connecticut	Connecticut
8	Connecticut	Providence	Wisconsin	Northeastern
9	Wisconsin	Northeastern	Northeastern	Cornell
10	Providence	Wisconsin	Cornell	Wisconsin

USA Today
Ranking	Week of February 1	Week of February 8	Week of February 15	Week of February 22
1	Mercyhurst (10)	Mercyhurst	Mercyhurst (19)	Mercyhurst (19)
2	Minnesota (9)	Minnesota	Minnesota	Minnesota Duluth
3	Clarkson	Minnesota Duluth	Minnesota Duluth	Minnesota
4	New Hampshire	Clarkson	New Hampshire	Harvard
5	Minnesota Duluth	Harvard	Clarkson	New Hampshire
6	Harvard	New Hampshire	Harvard	Clarkson
7	Northeastern	Connecticut	Connecticut	Northeastern
8	Connecticut	Northeastern	Northeastern	Connecticut
9	Wisconsin		Cornell	Cornell
10	Cornell	Wisconsin	Wisconsin	Providence

==== March ====
USCHO.com/CBS College Sports
Ranking	Week of March 2	Week of March 9	Week of March 16	Week of March 23
1	Mercyhurst	Mercyhurst (14)	Mercyhurst (14)	
2	Minnesota-Duluth	Minnesota-Duluth (1)	Minnesota-Duluth (1)	
3	Minnesota	Minnesota	Minnesota	
4	Harvard	Harvard	Harvard	
5	New Hampshire	Clarkson	Clarkson	
6	Clarkson	Cornell	Cornell	
7	Connecticut	New Hampshire	New Hampshire	
8	Cornell	Boston University	Boston University	
9	Northeastern	Connecticut	Connecticut	
10	Providence	Northeastern	Northeastern	

USA Today
Ranking	Week of March 2	Week of March 9	Week of March 16	Week of March 23
1	Mercyhurst	Mercyhurst (19)		
2	Minnesota-Duluth	Minnesota-Duluth		
3	Minnesota	Minnesota		
4	Harvard	Harvard		
5	New Hampshire	New Hampshire		
6	Clarkson	Clarkson		
7	Northeastern	Connecticut		
8	Connecticut	Cornell		
9	Cornell	Northeastern		
10	Providence	Providence		

== 2010 Olympics ==
=== Active players ===
The following active NCAA players would represent their respective countries in Ice hockey at the 2010 Winter Olympics.

Player	NCAA school	Nationality	Position	Goals	Assists	Points	Finish
Meghan Agosta	Mercyhurst	Canada	Forward	9	6	15	Gold
Elin Holmlöv	Minnesota-Duluth	Sweden	Forward				4th place
Haley Irwin	Minnesota-Duluth	Canada	Forward	5	1	6	Gold
Rebecca Johnston	Cornell	Canada	Forward	1	5	6	Gold
Jocelyne Lamoureux	North Dakota	United States	Forward				Silver
Monique Lamoureux	North Dakota	United States	Forward	4	6	10	Silver
Darcia Leimgruber	Maine	Switzerland	Forward				5th place
Kim Martin	Minnesota-Duluth	Sweden	Goaltender				4th place
Julia Marty	Northeastern	Switzerland	Defense				5th place
Stefanie Marty	Syracuse	Switzerland	Forward	9	2	11	5th place
Heidi Pelttari	Minnesota State	Finland	Forward				Bronze
Mariia Posa	Minnesota State	Finland	Forward				Bronze
Noora Räty	Minnesota	Finland	Goaltender				Bronze
Florence Schelling	Northeastern	Switzerland	Goaltender				5th place
Nina Tikkinen	Minnesota State	Finland	Forward				Bronze
Zuzana Tomčíková	Bemidji State	Slovakia	Goaltender				8th
Saara Tuominen	Minnesota Duluth	Finland	Forward				Bronze
Sarah Vaillancourt	Harvard	Canada	Forward	3	5	8	Gold

=== Former players ===
Player	NCAA school	Nationality	Position	Goals	Assists	Points	Medal
Gillian Apps	Dartmouth	Canada	Forward	3	4	7	Gold
Jennifer Botterill	Harvard	Canada	Forward	0	2	2	Gold
Tessa Bonhomme	Ohio State	Canada	Forward	2	2	4	Gold
Julie Chu	Harvard	United States	Forward				Silver
Natalie Darwitz	Minnesota	United States	Forward	4	7	11	Silver
Meghan Duggan	Wisconsin	United States	Forward				Silver
Molly Engstrom	Wisconsin	United States	Defense				Silver
Gina Kingsbury	St. Lawrence	Canada	Forward	2	1	3	Gold
Hilary Knight	Wisconsin	United States	Forward				Silver
Brianne McLaughlin	Robert Morris Colonials	United States	Goaltender	0	0	0	Silver
Gigi Marvin	Minnesota	United States	Forward				Silver
Meghan Mikkelson	Wisconsin	Canada	Forward				Gold
Caroline Ouellette	Minnesota-Duluth	Canada	Forward	2	9	11	Gold
Cherie Piper	Dartmouth	Canada	Forward	5	5	10	Gold
Angela Ruggiero	Harvard	United States	Defense				Silver
Jenny Potter	Minnesota Duluth	United States	Forward	6	5	11	Silver
Kelli Stack	Boston College	United States	Forward	3	5	8	Silver
Karen Thatcher	Providence	United States	Defense				Silver
Jessie Vetter	Wisconsin	United States	Goaltender				Silver
Jinelle Zaugg	Wisconsin	United States	Forward				Silver

== Post-season tournaments ==
=== NCAA tournament ===
==== Regionals ====
Date	Time	Teams	Score	Notes
March 13	2:00 pm ET	Mercyhurst (29–2–3) vs. Boston University (17–8–12)	Mercyhurst, 4–1	Bailey Bram scored two goals, including the game winner
March 13	2:00 pm CT	Minnesota Duluth (28–8–2) vs. New Hampshire (19–8–5)	2–1	The Bulldogs fourth consecutive trip to Frozen Four
March 13	4:00 pm CT	Minnesota (25–8–5) vs. Clarkson (23–11–5)	3–2 (OT)	Emily West scored the game-winning goal
March 13		Harvard (20–7–5) vs. Cornell (19–8–6)	Cornell, 6–2	Played Mercyhurst for third time this season

==== Frozen Four ====
National Semifinals; March 19
M2	Mercyhurst	2
W1	Cornell	3
S1	Minnesota Duluth	3
E3	Minnesota	2

National Championship Game; March 21
W1	Cornell	2
S1	Minnesota Duluth	3

== Stats leaders ==
=== Scoring ===
- This is an incomplete list.

Player	School	Goals	Assists	Points	PIM
Vicki Bendus	Mercyhurst	27	35	62	
Jesse Scanzano	Mercyhurst	19	41	60	
Emmanuelle Blais	Minnesota Duluth	28	31	59	36
Bailey Bram	Mercyhurst	27	26	53	
Hokey Langan	Ohio State	25	26	51	36
Kelly Paton	New Hampshire	19	32	51	
Micaela Long	New Hampshire	12	38	50	
Felicia Nelson	St.Cloud State	31	15	46	

=== Goaltending ===
Player	School	Games played	Minutes	Goals against	Wins	Losses	Ties	Shutouts	Save %	Goals against average

=== Other ===
Metric	Player	School	Number
Points per game	Jesse Scanzano	Mercyhurst	1.97
Goals per game	Felicia Nelson	St. Cloud State	0.91
Assists per game	Jesse Scanzano	Mercyhurst	1.36
Power play goals	Felicia Nelson	St. Cloud State	15
Short handed goals	Vicki Bendus and Bailey Bram (tie)	Mercyhurst	5
Game winning goals	Emmanuelle Blais; Emily West	Minnesota-Duluth; Minnesota	10
Save percentage	Victoria Vigilanti	Quinnipiac	.950
Goals against average	Victoria Vigilanti	Quinnipiac	1.25
Goalie winning percentage	Hillary Pattenden	Mercyhurst	.871

== Awards and honors ==
=== Patty Kazmaier Memorial Award nominees ===
Player	Position	Class	School
Cristin Allen	D	Sr.	Univ. of Connecticut
Melissa Anderson	F	Sr.	Boston Univ.
Jenni Bauer	G	Jr.	Niagara Univ.
Vicki Bendus	F	Jr.	Mercyhurst College
Courtney Birchard	D	Jr.	Univ. of New Hampshire
Emmanuelle Blais	F	Sr.	Univ. of Minnesota Duluth
Bailey Bram	F	So.	Mercyhurst College
Kate Buesser	F	Jr.	Harvard Univ.
Leanna Coskren	D	Jr.	Harvard Univ.
Lauren Dahm^	G	Jr.	Clarkson Univ.
Brianna Delaney	F	So.	Robert Morris Univ.
Kate Dunlop	F	Sr.	Sacred Heart Univ.
Lauren Fontaine	F	Jr.	Sacred Heart Univ.
Laura Fortino	D	Fr.	Cornell Univ.
Laura Fridfinnson	F	Jr.	Univ. of Minnesota Duluth
Laura Gersten	D	Sr.	Rensselaer
Caitlin Hogan	F	Sr.	St. Cloud State Univ.
Christina Kessler	G	Sr.	Harvard Univ.
Bray Ketchum	F	Jr.	Yale Univ.
Genevieve Lacasse	G	So.	Providence College
Hokey Langan	F	Fr.	The Ohio State Univ.
Micaela Long	F	Sr.	Univ. of New Hampshire
Felicia Nelson	F	Sr.	St. Cloud State Univ.
Sara O'Malley	F	Jr.	Robert Morris Univ.
Sarah Parsons	F	Sr.	Dartmouth College
Kelly Paton	F	Sr.	Univ. of New Hampshire
Noora Räty	G	Fr.	Univ. of Minnesota
Lauriane Rougeau	D	Fr.	Cornell Univ.
Liza Ryabkina	F	Jr.	Harvard Univ.
Jesse Scanzano	F	Jr.	Mercyhurst College
Florence Schelling	G	So.	Northeastern Univ.
Anne Schleper	D	So.	Univ. of Minnesota
Lucy Schoedel^	G	Sr.	Syracuse Univ.
Britney Selina	F	Sr.	Clarkson Univ.
Britni Smith	D	Sr.	St. Lawrence Univ.
Jaclyn Snikeris	G	Jr.	Yale Univ.
Natalie Spooner	F	So.	The Ohio State Univ.
Katie Stewart	F	Sr.	Colgate Univ.
Dominique Thibault^	F	Sr.	Clarkson Univ.
Allie Thunstrom	F	Sr.	Boston College
Zuzana Tomcikova	G	So.	Bemidji State Univ.
Amanda Trunzo^	F	Jr.	Dartmouth College
Sonja van der Bliek	G	Jr.	Rensselaer
Emily West	F	Jr.	Univ. of Minnesota
Catherine White	F	So.	Cornell Univ.

=== Patty Kazmaier Memorial Award finalists ===
= Indicates winner

= Indicates finalist

Player	Position	Class	School
Vicki Bendus	F	Jr.	Mercyhurst College
Emmanuelle Blais	F	Sr.	Univ. of Minnesota Duluth
Bailey Bram	F	So.	Mercyhurst College
Felicia Nelson	F	Sr.	St. Cloud State Univ.
Sarah Parsons	F	Sr.	Dartmouth College
Kelly Paton	F	Sr.	Univ. of New Hampshire
Noora Räty	G	Fr.	Univ. of Minnesota
Jesse Scanzano	F	Jr.	Mercyhurst College
Florence Schelling	G	So.	Northeastern Univ.
Britni Smith	D	Sr.	St. Lawrence Univ.

=== National and conference awards ===
Award	Player	School
Patty Kazmaier Award	Vicki Bendus	Mercyhurst
CHA Most Valuable Player	Vicki Bendus	Mercyhurst
CHA Rookie of the Year	Isabel Menard	Syracuse
ECAC Most Valuable Player	Catherine White	Cornell
ECAC Rookie of the Year	Victoria Vigilanti	Quinnipiac
HEA Most Valuable Player	Kelly Paton and Florence Schelling(tie)	New Hampshire and Northeastern
HEA Rookie of the Year	Kristina Lavoie	New Hampshire
(tie) Felicia Nelson and Zuzana Tomcikova(tie)	St. Cloud State and Bemidji State	
WCHA Rookie of the Year	Hokey Langan	Ohio State
Division I Women's Coach of the Year	Doug Derragh	Cornell
USCHO.com Coach of the Year		

=== All-conference honors ===
- CHA

Player	Position	School
Jenni Bauer	G	Niagara
Melissa Lacroix	D	Mercyhurst
Cassea Schols	D	Mercyhurst
Vicki Bendus	F	Mercyhurst
Bailey Bram	F	Mercyhurst
Isabel Menard	F	Syracuse
Jesse Scanzano	F	Mercyhurst

- ECAC

Player	Position	School
	G	
	D	
	D	
	C	
	RW	
	LW	

- HEA

Player	Position	School
Florence Schelling	G	Northeastern
Cristin Allen	D	Connecticut
Courtney Birchard	D	New Hampshire
Ashley Cottrell	F	Providence
Micaela Long	F	New Hampshire
Kelly Paton	F	New Hampshire

- WCHA

Player	Position	School
Noora Räty	G	Minnesota
Jaime Rasmussen	D	Minnesota Duluth
Anne Schleper	D	Minnesota
Emmanuelle Blais	F	Minnesota Duluth
Natalie Spooner	F	Ohio State
Emily West	F	Minnesota

=== All-rookie team ===
- CHA

Player	Position	School
None selected	G	None selected
Jenaya Townsend	D	Wayne State
Samantha Watt	D	Mercyhurst
Holly Carrie-Mattimoe	F	Syracuse
Jenna Hendrikx	F	Niagara
Isabel Menard	F	Syracuse

- ECAC

Player	Position	School
	G	
	D	
	D	
	F	
	F	
	F	

- HEA

Player	Position	School
Brittany Ott	G	Maine
Blake Bolden	D	Boston College
Brittany Esposito	F	Northeastern
Jill Cardella	F	Boston University
Kristina Lavoie	F	New Hampshire
Ashley Motherwell	F	Boston College

- WCHA

Player	Position	School
Noora Räty	G	Minnesota
Megan Bozek	D	Minnesota
Stefanie McKeough	D	Wisconsin
Brianne Decker	F	Wisconsin
Hokey Langan	F	Ohio State
Katherine Wilson	F	Minnesota Duluth

=== All-America honors ===
==== First team ====
Player	Position	School
Noora Räty	G	Minnesota
Laura Fortino	D	Cornell
Anne Schleper	D	Minnesota
Emmanuelle Blais	F	Minnesota-Duluth
Vicki Bendus	F	Mercyhurst
Kelly Paton	F	New Hampshire

==== Second team ====
Player	Position	School
Florence Schelling	G	Northeastern
Courtney Birchard	D	New Hampshire
Lauriane Rougeau	D	Cornell
Felicia Nelson	F	St. Cloud State
Jesse Scanzano	F	Mercyhurst
Catherine White	F	Cornell

=== New England Hockey Writers All-Star Team ===
- Forwards
  - Kate Buesser – Harvard
  - Ashley Cottrell – Providence
  - Jenna Cunningham – Dartmouth
  - Micaela Long – New Hampshire
  - Sarah Parsons – Dartmouth
  - Kelly Paton – New Hampshire
- Defense
  - Cristin Allen – Connecticut
  - Courtney Birchard – New Hampshire
  - Amber Yung – Providence
  - Tara Watchorn – Boston University
- Goalies
  - Florence Schelling – Northeastern
  - Victoria Vigilanti – Quinnipiac
- Coach of the Year: Rick Seeley – Quinnipiac
- Player of the Year: Kelly Paton – New Hampshire

=== All Ivy League honors ===
- First Team All-Ivy
  - F – Catherine White, Cornell
  - F – Sarah Parsons, Dartmouth
  - F – Kate Buesser, Harvard
  - D – Laura Fortino, Cornell
  - D – Lauriane Rougeau, Cornell
  - G – Amanda Mazzotta, Cornell
  - G – Jacklyn Snikeris, Yale
- Second Team All-Ivy
  - F – Chelsea Karpenko, Cornell
  - F – Jillian Dempsey, Harvard
  - F – Bray Ketchum, Yale
  - D – Leanna Coskren, Harvard
  - D – Sasha Sherry, Princeton
  - G – Katie Jamieson, Brown
- Honorable Mention
  - F – Danielle DiCesare, Princeton
  - F – Paula Romanchuk, Princeton
  - D – Cori Bassett, Harvard
  - D – Alyssa Clarke, Yale
  - G – Christina Kessler, Harvard
- Player of the Year, Catherine White, Cornell
- Rookie of the Year, Lauriane Rougeau, Cornell

== Frozen Four Skills Competition ==
The Frozen Four skills competition was held on April 9 at Ford Field in Detroit, Michigan.

=== Eastern squad ===
- Melissa Anderson, Boston University
- Anna McDonald, Harvard
- Sarah Parsons, Dartmouth
- Kelly Paton, New Hampshire
- Britni Smith, St. Lawrence
- Allie Thunstrom, Boston College
- The two goalies are:
  - Brittony Chartier, St. Lawrence
  - Melissa Haber, Boston U.

=== Western squad ===
- Kelli Blankenship, Minnesota
- Rachel Davis, Ohio State
- Caitlin Hogan, St. Cloud State
- Kyla Sanders, Wisconsin
- Chelsea Walkland, Robert Morris
- Ashley Young, Minnesota State Mankato .
- The two goalies are:
  - Lauren Bradel, St. Thomas (Minnesota)
  - Lindsey Park, Wayne State

== See also ==
- National Collegiate Women's Ice Hockey Championship
- 2009–10 College Hockey America women's ice hockey season
- 2009–10 Eastern College Athletic Conference women's ice hockey season
- 2009-10 WCHA women's ice hockey season
- 2009–10 NCAA Division I men's ice hockey season
- 2009–10 NCAA Division I women's basketball season
