= 2009–10 Harvard Crimson women's ice hockey season =

Beanpot Champions NCAA Regionals, Lost 6–2 vs. Cornell
- Conference: 3 ECAC
- Home ice: Bright Hockey Center

Rankings
- USA Today/USA Hockey Magazine: 7
- USCHO.com/CBS College Sports: 4

Record

Coaches and captains
- Head coach: Katey Stone
- Captain: Cori Bassett
- Alternate captain: Kathryn Farni

The 2009–10 Harvard Crimson women's ice hockey team represented Harvard University in the 2009–10 NCAA Division I women's hockey season. The team was coached by Katey Stone. Assisting Stone were Joakim Flygh, Melanie Ruzzi and Sara DeCosta. The Crimson captured the program's 13th Beanpot title and earned a berth in the NCAA quarterfinals. Games will be broadcast locally on 95.3 FM WHRB.

== Offseason ==
- July 10: A trio of former Harvard All-America skaters have been selected to attend the 2009 USA Hockey Women's National Festival. The festival will take place Aug. 18–24 in Blaine, Minnesota. The three former Harvard skaters are Caitlin Cahow, Julie Chu and Angela Ruggiero. They are among the 41 players who will participate at the festival. It will serve as the selection for the 2009-10 U.S. Women's National Team. The national squad will compete in the Qwest Tour that begins Sept. 25 and ends prior to the start of the 2010 Winter Olympics in Vancouver, B.C. The roster for the 2009-10 U.S. Women's National Team will be announced on August 24.
- July 27: For the second consecutive year, several current and former members of the Harvard women's hockey team will raise money for breast cancer research. The members are competing at the Angela Ruggiero Chowder Cup Tournament, at the Foxboro Sports Center July 30-Aug. 2.
  - Among the Harvard members are: Caitlin Cahow, Kirsten Kester, Sarah Wilson, Kate Buesser, Ashley Wheeler, Jillian Dempsey, Josephine Pucci and Kaitlin Spurling. The team will wear pink uniforms during the tournament, donate time off the ice to take breast cancer research donations.
- August 12: Harvard senior goaltender Christina Kessler made 25 saves to guide Canada's National Women's Under-22 Team to a 4–0 victory over Sweden at the under-22 selection camp at Father David Bauer Olympic Arena in Calgary, Alberta.
- Sept 22: Harvard has been picked to finish second in ECAC Hockey, according to the coaches poll released by the conference. Goaltender Christina Kessler has been named to the ECAC Hockey Preseason All-Conference Team for the second consecutive season. Harvard claimed three first-place votes and 103 points in the poll, finishing second in the preseason poll to St. Lawrence.

== Recruiting ==
Player	Nationality	Position	Notes
Laura Bellamy	United States	Goaltender	
Margaret Chute	United States	Forward	
Jillian Dempsey	United States	Forward	Boston Bruins John Carlton Award winner in 2009
Hilary Hayssen	United States	Defense	
Josephine Pucci	United States	Defense	
Kelsey Romatowski	United States	Defense	
Kaitlin Spurling	United States	Forward	Chuck Vernon Award winner as Division I Tournament MVP in 2008, was the 2006 and 2007 Eastern Independent League MVP, was a Salem Evening News All-Star and MVP in 2006 and 2007

== Regular season ==
- October 5: The Harvard women's hockey team was ranked No. 9 in the country. The USCHO.com officials revealed it in their first Top-10 Women's Hockey Poll of the season. Harvard accumulated 28 points.
- November 7: The 10th-ranked Harvard women's ice hockey team had a 3–0 shutout victory over No. 7 St. Lawrence at Bright Hockey Center. The Crimson earned the program's 500th victory.
- December 10: Seniors Cori Bassett and Anna McDonald and junior Kate Buesser have been selected to the ECAC Hockey All-Star Game roster. The all-star team will play the 2010 U.S. Women's National Team in an exhibition game Sunday, Jan. 2.
- December 17: Former Crimson skaters and All-Americans Caitlin Cahow '07-08, Julie Chu '06-07 and Angela Ruggiero '02-04 are among 21 players named to the 2010 U.S. Olympic Women's Hockey Team.
- December 22: Harvard alumnae Jennifer Botterill '02-03 and Sarah Vaillancourt '08-09 are among 21 players who have been selected to represent Canada's National Women's Hockey Team at the 2010 Olympic Winter Games in Vancouver, B.C.
- February 9: Liza Ryabkina's second-period goal beat Northeastern 1–0, as Harvard claimed the Women's Beanpot. The Crimson prevailed in the Beanpot final for the ninth time in the last 12 years and for the 13th time overall.
- February 17: Four members of the Crimson are nominees for the Patty Kazmaier Memorial Award. The nominees include: Christina Kessler, Kate Buesser, Liza Ryabkina and Leanna Coskren.
- February 18: Junior forward Liza Ryabkina will be featured in the Feb. 22 edition of Sports Illustrated's Faces in the Crowd column.
- February 26: With a 5–1 victory over Princeton, Katey Stone became women's college hockey's all-time winningest coach, surpassing former Minnesota head coach Laura Halldorson.
- March 4: Katie Buesser has been named a finalist for the ECAC Player of the Year Award.

=== Roster ===
Number	Name	Class	Position	Height
18	Cori Bassett	Senior	Defenseman	5-9
27	Alisa Baumgartner	Sophomore	Forward	5-5
1	Laura Bellamy	Freshman	Goaltender	5-8
22	Jen Brawn	Senior	Defenseman	5-8
20	Kate Buesser	Junior	Forward	5-6
15	Katharine Chute	Junior	Forward	5-7
7	Margaret Chute	Freshman	Forward	5-6
11	Deborah Conway	Junior	Forward	5-4
24	Leanna Coskren	Junior	Defenseman	5-5
14	Jillian Dempsey	Freshman	Forward	5-4
8	Kathryn Farni	Senior	Defenseman	5-10
23	Randi Griffin	Senior	Forward	5-6
4	Hilary Hayssen	Freshman	Defenseman	5-8
21	Whitney Kennedy	Sophomore	Forward	5-8
35	Christina Kessler	Senior	Goaltender	5-6
10	Anna McDonald	Senior	Forward	5-9
2	Josephine Pucci	Freshman	Defenseman	5-8
5	Kelsey Romatoski	Freshman	Defenseman	5-2
3	Liza Ryabkina	Junior	Defenseman/Forward	5-9
17	Kaitlin Spurling	Freshman	Forward	5-9
19	Amy Uber	Junior	Forward	5-4
12	Ashley Wheeler	Junior	Defenseman	5-8

== Player stats ==
= Indicates team leader

=== Skaters ===
Player	Games	Goals	Assists	Points	Points/game	PIM	GWG	PPG	SHG
Kate Buesser	33	16	24	40	1.2121	14	1	2	0
Jillian Dempsey	33	11	16	27	0.8182	12	1	3	1
Liza Ryabkina	24	15	7	22	0.9167	24	4	5	0
Randi Griffin	33	11	10	21	0.6364	28	4	7	0
Leanna Coskren	33	8	11	19	0.5758	14	3	4	0
Cori Bassett	33	4	15	19	0.5758	26	1	1	0
Anna McDonald	33	6	11	17	0.5152	22	1	1	0
Kathryn Farni	33	1	15	16	0.4848	20	0	1	0
Josephine Pucci	31	4	9	13	0.4194	20	0	1	0
Kaitlin Spurling	33	9	3	12	0.3636	16	4	1	0
Katharine Chute	33	5	5	10	0.3030	18	0	0	0
Kelsey Romatoski	23	1	7	8	0.3478	8	0	0	0
Ashley Wheeler	33	2	3	5	0.1515	26	1	0	0
Margaret Chute	33	1	3	4	0.1212	0	0	0	0
Deborah Conway	31	0	2	2	0.0645	4	0	0	0
Alisa Baumgartner	33	0	2	2	0.0606	12	0	0	0
Hilary Hayssen	33	0	0	0	0.0000	12	0	0	0
Laura Bellamy	18	0	0	0	0.0000	0	0	0	0
Kylie Stephens	3	0	0	0	0.0000	0	0	0	0
Christina Kessler	15	0	0	0	0.0000	0	0	0	0

=== Goaltenders ===
Player	Games Played	Minutes	Goals Against	Wins	Losses	Ties	Shutouts	Save %	Goals Against Average
Christina Kessler									

== Postseason ==
On March 13, 2010, the Cornell Big Red women's ice hockey program defeated the Crimson by a score of 6-2 to earn its first ever trip to the NCAA Frozen Four.

== Awards and honors ==
- Laura Bellamy, Bertagna Award (Beanpot's top goaltender)
- Kate Buesser, ECAC Offensive Player of the Week (Week of November 16)
- Kate Buesser, New England Hockey Writers All-Star Team
- Jillian Dempsey, ECAC Rookie of the Week (Week of November 16)
- Jillian Dempsey, Harvard, 2010 ECAC All-Rookie Team
- Randi Griffin, ECAC Offensive Player of the Week (Week of February 22)
- Christina Kessler, Pre-Season All-ECAC Team
- Anna McDonald, Frozen Four Skills Competition participant
- Liza Ryabkina, Beanpot Most Valuable Player

=== All-Ivy honors ===
- Cori Bassett, Senior, Defense, 2010 Honorable Mention
- Kate Buesser, Forward, Junior, 2010 First Team All-Ivy
- Leanna Coskren, Defense, Junior, 2010 Second Team All-Ivy
- Jillian Dempsey, Forward, Freshman, 2010 Second Team All-Ivy
- Christina Kessler, Goaltender, Senior, 2010 Honorable Mention

== See also ==
- 2009–10 NCAA Division I women's ice hockey season
