= Jackie Friesen =

Canadian ice hockey player and coach

Current position
- Title: Assistant coach
- Team: Wisconsin Badgers
- Conference: WCHA

Biographical details
- Born: August 4, 1983 (age 43); Regina, Saskatchewan, Canada
- Education: University of Wisconsin–Madison

Playing career
- 2001–2005: Wisconsin Badgers
- 2006–2007: DSC Oberthurgau
- 2007–2009: HC Slavia Praha
- Position: Forward

Coaching career (HC unless noted)
- 2005–2006: Wisconsin Badgers (undergrad assistant)
- 2014–2015: Canada U18 (assistant)
- 2009–: Wisconsin Badgers (assistant)

Accomplishments and honors

Championships
- 4 National Championships (2006, 2011, 2019, 2021)

Jacklyn "Jackie" Crum née Friesen (born August 4, 1983) is a Canadian ice hockey coach, currently serving as an assistant coach with the Wisconsin Badgers women's ice hockey program in the Western Collegiate Hockey Association (WCHA) conference of the NCAA Division I. A retired forward, her professional career was played in Switzerland and the Czech Republic.

== Playing career ==
Crum played four years of college ice hockey with the Wisconsin Baders during the 2001–02 season to the 2004–05 season. Across 136 games, she amassed 87 points on 53 goals and 34 assists, and was a four-year letterwinner. She was named to the WCHA All-Academic Team in 2003 and served as an alternate captain in the 2004–05 season.

She was a member of the Canadian women's national ice hockey development team (also called the U22 or under-22 team) during 2001 to 2004, and contributed to Canada's victories at the 2003 Air Canada Cup and 2004 Air Canada Cup.

Her first professional contract was signed with DSC Oberthurgau for the 2006–07 season of the Leistungsklasse A (LKA), the elite ice hockey league in Switzerland. Crum joined a roster that featured American defenceman and fellow NCAA-product Jill McInnis, Finnish Olympian Petra Vaarakallio, German Olympian Maritta Becker, and Swiss under-18 players Laura Benz, Sara Benz, Rahel Michielin, Anja Stiefel, Monika Waidacher, and Nina Waidacher, all of whom would later become Olympians. DSC Oberthurgau finished third in the regular season before being knocked out of the playoff semifinals by EV Zug.

After one season in Switzerland, Crum relocated to Prague and signed with the women's team of HC Slavia Praha, which was active in both the Elite Women's Hockey League (EWHL) and the Czech Women's 1. Liga, the premier Czech national ice hockey league (renamed Women's Extraliga in 2017). With the team, she won the Czech Championship in 2008 and 2009, the EWHL Championship in 2008 and 2009, and played in the IIHF European Women Champions Cup during the 2007–08 season and 2008–09 season tournaments.

== Coaching career ==
Crum's first coaching experience was as an undergraduate assistant with the Badgers in the 2005–06 season, at the conclusion of which the team won the 2006 National Championship.

After playing professionally in Europe, Crum was hired by the Badgers to assist interim head coach Tracey DeKeyser during the 2009–10 season while head coach Mark Johnson took a leave of absence in order to coach the United States women's national ice hockey team at the 2010 Winter Olympics in Vancouver. Crum was hired to a full-time position in 2010 after Johnson's return.

== Personal life ==
Crum graduated with a B.S. in kinesiology and physical education from the University of Wisconsin–Madison in 2006.

She and Tim Crum were married in 2016 and have two children.
