= Jinelle Zaugg-Siergiej =

American ice hockey player and coach

Current position
- Title: Associate head coach
- Team: St. Cloud State Huskies
- Conference: WCHA

Biographical details
- Born: March 27, 1986 (age 40); Rockford, Illinois, United States
- Education: University of Wisconsin–Madison

Playing career
- 2004–2008: Wisconsin Badgers
- 2008–2009: Minnesota Whitecaps
- Position: Forward

Coaching career (HC unless noted)
- 2010–2013: Arrowhead Warhawks
- 2013–2014: Robert Morris Colonials (asst.)
- 2014–2019: St. Cloud State Huskies (asst.)
- 2019–present: St. Cloud State Huskies (assoc. HC)
Medal record
Olympic Games
Silver medal – second place	2010 Vancouver	Ice hockey
IIHF World Women's Championships
Silver medal – second place	2007 Canada

Jinelle Lynn Zaugg-Siergiej née Zaugg (born March 27, 1986) is an American retired ice hockey player and former member of the United States national team, currently serving as associate head coach to the St. Cloud State Huskies women's ice hockey team. She was a member of the 2009–10 United States national women's ice hockey team and won a silver medal in the women's ice hockey tournament at the 2010 Winter Olympics in Vancouver.

Zaugg played college ice hockey with the Wisconsin Badgers women's ice hockey program and won the NCAA Women's Ice Hockey Tournament title with the team in 2006 and 2007. In addition, she helped the Minnesota Whitecaps to the Western Women's Hockey League championship in the 2008–09 season.

== Playing career ==
- In high school, Zaugg played for the varsity boys' ice hockey team of Northland Pines High School in Eagle River, Wisconsin. She was on the team that won back-to-back Lumberjack Conference championships as a junior and senior.

=== Wisconsin Badgers ===
- Over her four-year career at the University of Wisconsin–Madison, Zaugg won two national championships, and scored 133 career points. In addition, she was named to the 2007 Frozen Four All-Tournament Team, and served as team captain in the 2007–08 season. In her first year at Wisconsin, Zaugg managed to score 12 goals on a shooting percentage of 15%. With 24 goals in the 2005–06 season, she established herself as a major threat on a championship-bound Badgers team. In her junior year, she put together a 29-goal season — nearly doubling her WCHA scoring output of 12 goals from the prior season with 20 goals in conference play. Eight of Zaugg's team-leading 29 goals were game-winners, earning her reputation as a clutch player. When Wisconsin won its second national championship in 2006, Zaugg notched two of the three goals in the game and garnered All-Tournament honors.

==== Statistics ====
Season	Team	League	GP	G	A	Pts	PIM
2004–05	Wisconsin Badgers	NCAA D1	37	12	14	26	12
2005–06	Wisconsin Badgers	NCAA D1	41	24	13	37	22
2006–07	Wisconsin Badgers	NCAA D1	41	29	21	50	22
2007–08	Wisconsin Badgers	NCAA D1	41	24	19	43	28
NCAA totals			160	89	67	156	84

=== USA Hockey ===
- Zaugg was a member of the silver medal winning U.S. women's national team at the 2007 IIHF Women's World Championship. She was a two-time member of the U.S. women's select team for the Four Nations Cup, competing in 2006 and in 2007. During that time, she was also a member of the U.S. women's under-22 select team. She participated in the USA Hockey Women's National Festival in 2006, 2007, and 2009. On March 25, 2011, she officially announced her retirement from the USA Hockey Women’s National Program.

==== 2010 Olympic team ====
- Six of her teammates on the U.S. Olympic team were former Wisconsin teammates: Meghan Duggan, Molly Engstrom, Hilary Knight, Erika Lawler, Jessie Vetter, and Kerry Weiland.
- January 5: In an exhibition game against the Wisconsin Badgers women's ice hockey team, Zaugg netted a goal and had an assist as Team USA won by a score of 9–0.

== Personal life ==
Born in Rockford, Illinois, Zaugg-Siergiej's hometown is Eagle River, Wisconsin.

Prior to the Vancouver Winter Games, she married former MSOE ice hockey player and Northland Pines teammate Michael Siergiej.

On September 22, 2010, Zaugg-Siergiej and Jessie Vetter threw out the ceremonial first pitch at Miller Park before the Milwaukee Brewers vs Cincinnati Reds baseball game.

For the 2010–11 season, Zaugg-Siergiej became the head coach of the girls hockey team at Arrowhead High School in Hartland, Wisconsin. For the 2010–11 season, she served as head coach for an U-14 girls hockey team called the Wild Cats, based in The State of Wisconsin. This was in Waunakee or Milwaukee, Wisconsin. She has served as an assistant coach for the women's hockey team at St. Cloud State University since the 2014–15 season.

== Jinelle Siergiej Award ==
Wisconsin Prep Hockey (WiPH) introduced the Jinelle Siergiej Award recognizing the league's "Overall Offensive Player of the Year" in 2011. All offensive ice hockey players active in the WiPH girls' league are eligible and each coach is asked to nominate a player from their respective team. Award winners to date are:

Year	Winner	Team
2011	Alice Cranston	St. Croix Valley Fusion
2012	Theresa Knutson	Onalaska Hilltoppers
2013	Theresa Knutson	Onalaska Hilltoppers
2014	Theresa Knutson	Onalaska Hilltoppers
2015	Nicole Unsworth	University School Wild Cats
2016	Nicole Unsworth	University School Wild Cats
2017	Abigail Stow	Eau Claire Area Stars
2018	Abigail Stow	Eau Claire Area Stars
2019	Maddy Jablonski	Fox Cities Stars
2020	Maddy Jablonski	Fox Cities Stars
2021	McKayla Zilisch	Fox Cities Stars
2022	McKayla Zilisch	Fox Cities Stars
2023	Autumn Cooper	Superior Spartans

== Awards and honors ==
- Wisconsin Badgers career leader in goals (89), power-play goals (29), game-winning goals (22) and games played (160).
