= 2002–03 Wisconsin Badgers women's ice hockey season =

- Conference: 3rd WCHA
- Home ice: Kohl Center

Rankings
- USA Today/USA Hockey Magazine: #6
- USCHO.com/CBS College Sports: #5

Record
- Overall: 22-8-5

Coaches and captains
- Head coach: Mark Johnson
- Assistant coaches: Tracey Cornell; Dan Koch; Forrest Kerr
- Captain: Sis Paulsen

The 2002–03 Wisconsin Badgers women's ice hockey team was the Badgers' 3rd season. Head coach Mark Johnson was in his first season as Badgers head coach.

== Exhibition games ==
Date	Result	Opponent	Score
1/8	W	at McGill*	5-0
1/11	L	at Brampton Thunder*	3-4

== Regular season ==
=== Schedule ===
Date	Result	Opponent	Score
10/12	W	NORTHEASTERN (5)	4-2
10/13	W	NORTHEASTERN (5)	2-1
10/19	W	at Connecticut	6-0
10/20	W	at Connecticut	4-2
10/25	L	MINNESOTA DULUTH (1)	2-7
10/26	T	MINNESOTA DULUTH (1)	3-3 OT
11/1	L	at Minnesota (2)	1-3
11/2	L	at Minnesota (2)	1-2
11/8	W	ST. CLOUD STATE	4-2
11/9	L	ST. CLOUD STATE	3-5
11/16	W	at Mercyhurst (10)	3-2
11/17	W	at Mercyhurst (10)	4-2
11/22	T	OHIO STATE	3-3 OT
11/23	W	OHIO STATE	4-0
11/30	T	MINNESOTA STATE	3-3 OT
12/1	W	MINNESOTA STATE	4-0
12/6	T	at Bemidji State	2-2 OT
12/7	W	at Bemidji State	4-0
1/7	W	at St. Lawrence(5)	2-1
1/17	W	at Minnesota Duluth (2)	2-1
1/18	L	at Minnesota Duluth (2)	1-4
1/24	L	NEW HAMPSHIRE (5)	0-2
1/25	T	NEW HAMPSHIRE (5)	1-1 OT
1/31	W	at Minnesota State	6-1
2/1	W	at Minnesota State	3-1
2/8	W	BEMIDJI STATE	5-3
2/9	W	BEMIDJI STATE	5-1
2/14	W	at St. Cloud State	3-2
2/15	W	at St. Cloud State	9-2
2/21	W	at Ohio State	7-1
2/22	W	at Ohio State	2-1
2/28	W	MINNESOTA (3)	2-1
3/1	L	MINNESOTA (3)	0-2
3/7	L	vs. Minnesota (3)#	1-3
3/8	W	vs. Ohio State#	4-1
3/14	W	Ohio State	5-4

== Awards and honors ==
- Mark Johnson, WCHA Coach of the Year
- Sis Paulsen, All-WCHA second team
- Kerry Weiland, All-WCHA second team

=== Team awards ===
- Kendra Anthony, Offensive Player of the Year award
- Sharon Cole, Rookie of the Year
- Kathy Devereaux, UW Athletic Board scholars
- Kathryn Greaves, W Club Community Service Award
- Sis Paulsen and Katie Temple, Badger Award
- Sis Paulsen, Jeff Sauer Award
- Sis Paulsen, Defensive Player of the Year award
