= 2003–04 Wisconsin Badgers women's ice hockey season =

- Conference: 2nd WCHA
- Home ice: Kohl Center

Rankings
- USA Today/USA Hockey Magazine: #5
- USCHO.com/CBS College Sports: #5

Record
- Overall: 25-6-3

Coaches and captains
- Head coach: Mark Johnson
- Assistant coaches: Tracey Cornell; Dan Koch; Forrest Kerr; Sis Paulsen
- Captain: Carla MacLeod
- Alternate captain(s): Meghan Hunter; Steph Millar

The 2003–04 Wisconsin Badgers women's ice hockey team was the Badgers' 4th season. Head coach Mark Johnson was in his first season as Badgers head coach.

== Regular season ==
Senior Meghan Hunter finished her Badgers career as the all-time career goals scored leader (since broken) with 84 goals. She also finished as the Badgers all-time career leader in assists (since broken) with 93.

=== Schedule ===
Date	Result	Opponent	Score
10/10	W	VERMONT	2-0
10/11	W	VERMONT	7-0
10/19	W	University of Maine	5-4
10/20	W	University of Maine	6-1
10/25	L	MINNESOTA (1)	0-3
10/26	L	MINNESOTA (1)	1-3
11/1	L	OHIO STATE	2-3
11/2	W	OHIO STATE	3-1
11/7	W	Bemidji State	4-1
11/8	W	Bemidji State	2-0
11/14	W	Minnesota State	3-0
11/15	W	Minnesota State	4-3
11/21	W	ST. CLOUD STATE	4-0
11/22	W	ST. CLOUD STATE	8-1
12/5	L	Minnesota Duluth	0-3
12/6	W	Minnesota Duluth	3-2
1/10	T	Northeastern	1-1 OT
1/11	T	Northeastern	2-2 OT
1/17	T	MINNESOTA DULUTH (4)	1-1 OT
1/18	W	MINNESOTA DULUTH (4)	5-2
1/30	W	St. Cloud State	4-1
1/31	W	St. Cloud State	6-2
2/7	W	MINNESOTA STATE (9)	3-0
2/8	W	MINNESOTA STATE (9)	4-1
2/13	W	at Minnesota	2-1 OT
2/14	L	at Minnesota	1-2
2/20	W	NIAGARA	4-0
2/21	W	NIAGARA	8-1
2/27	W	Ohio State (10)	5-1
2/28	W	Ohio State (10)	8-2
3/6	W	BEMIDJI STATE	6-0
3/7	W	BEMIDJI STATE	2-1
3/13	L	Minnesota Duluth	1-3
3/14	W	Ohio State	5-4

== Awards and honors ==
- Sara Bauer, All-WCHA, Second Team
- Sara Bauer, WCHA Rookie of the Year
- Sara Bauer, WCHA All-Rookie Team
- Christine Dufour, WCHA All-Rookie Team
- Molly Engstrom, WCHA Defensive Player of the Year
- Molly Engstrom, All–WCHA, First Team
- Meghan Horras, All-WCHA, Second Team
- Meghan Horras, WCHA Goaltending Champion
- Meghan Horras, USCHO.com Player of the Week, Nov. 18, 2003
- Carla MacLeod, AHCA All-Americans, Second team
- Carla MacLeod, All-WCHA, Second Team
- Carla MacLeod, USCHO.com Player of the Week, February 10, 2004
- Bobbi Jo Slusar, WCHA All-Rookie Team

=== WCHA Rookie of the Week ===
- Sara Bauer, Mar. 2, 2004
- Sara Bauer, Mar. 9, 2004
- Christine Dufour, Nov. 10, 2003
- Lindsay Macy, Feb. 23, 2004
- Meaghan Mikkelson, Oct 13, 2003
- Meaghan Mikkelson, March 8, 2004

=== WCHA Player of the Week ===
- Nikki Burish, Nov. 24, 2003
- Meghan Horras, Jan. 19, 2004
- Meghan Horras, Feb. 16, 2004
- Carla MacLeod, Nov. 17, 2003
- Carla MacLeod, Feb. 9, 2004
- Karen Rickard, Nov. 10, 2003
- Karen Rickard, March 1, 2004

=== Academic Awards ===
- Nikki Burish, Academic All-WCHA
- Nikki Burish, Academic All-Big Ten
- Sharon Cole, Academic All-WCHA
- Sharon Cole, Academic All-Big Ten
- Sharon Cole, UW Athletic Board Scholars
- Leah Federman, Academic All-Big Ten
- Kathryn Greaves, Academic All-WCHA
- Leah Federman, Academic All-Big Ten
- Stephanie Millar, Academic All-WCHA
- Stephanie Millar, Academic All-Big Ten
- Nicole Uliasz, Academic All-WCHA
- Nicole Uliasz, Academic All-Big Ten
- Amy Vermeulen, Academic All-WCHA
- Amy Vermeulen, Academic All-Big Ten

=== Team Awards ===
- Sara Bauer, Rookie of the Year
- Sara Bauer, Offensive Player of the Year
- Molly Engstrom, Badger Award (known as Most Inspirational Player award)
- Molly Engstrom, Defensive Player of the Year
- Kathryn Greaves, W Club Community Service Award
- Meghan Hunter and Karen Rickard, Jeff Sauer Award (Presented to the player who consistently demonstrates dedication to her teammates)
