= 2007–08 Minnesota Golden Gophers women's ice hockey season =

- Conference: 2 WCHA
- Home ice: Ridder Arena

Record
- Overall: 27–7–4
- Conference: 21–5–2
- Home: 16–2–3
- Road: 11–4–1
- Neutral: 0–1–0

Coaches and captains
- Head coach: Brad Frost
- Assistant coaches: Tom Osiecki
- Captain(s): Bobbi Ross; Whitney Graft

The 2007–08 Minnesota Golden Gophers women's ice hockey season represented the University of Minnesota during the 2007–08 NCAA Division I women's ice hockey season. They were coached by Brad Frost in his first season.

== Offseason ==
- Former Gopher women's hockey greats Erica Killewald and Nadine Muzerall (Class of 2001) were inducted into the University of Minnesota's "M" Club Hall of Fame on Thursday September 27, 2007. Killewald and Muzerall were two of 13 Gopher greats to be inducted at the annual Hall of Fame Banquet. The duo are the first women's hockey players to be inducted into the hall of fame and the youngest in the group of 13.

== Regular season ==
=== Standings ===
2007–08 Western Collegiate Hockey Association standings
| | Conference | | | | | | | | Overall | | | | | |
| | GP | W | L | T | SOW | PTS | GF | GA | GP | W | L | T | GF | GA |
|---|---|---|---|---|---|---|---|---|---|---|---|---|---|---|
| Minnesota Duluth†* | 28 | 24 | 4 | 0 | – | 48 | 118 | 43 | 39 | 34 | 4 | 1 | 166 | 58 |
| Minnesota | 28 | 21 | 5 | 2 | – | 44 | 96 | 53 | 38 | 27 | 7 | 4 | 135 | 75 |
| Wisconsin | 28 | 20 | 5 | 3 | – | 43 | 94 | 36 | 41 | 29 | 9 | 3 | 142 | 58 |
| St. Cloud State | 28 | 11 | 13 | 4 | – | 26 | 54 | 78 | 38 | 18 | 15 | 5 | 86 | 102 |
| Ohio State | 28 | 11 | 14 | 3 | – | 25 | 81 | 94 | 37 | 17 | 17 | 3 | 108 | 115 |
| Minnesota State | 28 | 10 | 16 | 2 | – | 22 | 67 | 82 | 34 | 11 | 21 | 2 | 77 | 104 |
| North Dakota | 28 | 4 | 20 | 4 | – | 12 | 45 | 99 | 36 | 4 | 26 | 6 | 56 | 133 |
| Bemidji State | 28 | 1 | 25 | 2 | – | 4 | 24 | 94 | 36 | 4 | 29 | 3 | 38 | 115 |
Championship: † indicates conference regular season champion; * indicates conference tournament champion Updated July 21, 2024

=== Schedule ===
As of September 22, 2024.

| Date | Time | Opponent^{#} | Rank^{#} | Site | Decision | Result | Attendance | Record |
Regular Season
| October 5 | 7:07 | Northeastern* | #7 | Ridder Arena • Minneapolis, MN | Hanlon | W 5–3 | 961 | 1–0–0 |
| October 6 | 7:07 | Boston University* | #7 | Ridder Arena • Minneapolis, MN | Lura | W 4–2 | 942 | 2–0–0 |
| October 12 | 6:07 | St. Cloud State | #6 | Ridder Arena • Minneapolis, MN | Hanlon | T 4–4 ^{OT} | 1,135 | 2–0–1 (0–0–1) |
| October 13 | 2:07 | at St. Cloud State | #6 | Herb Brooks National Hockey Center • St. Cloud, MN | Lura | L 1–2 | 398 | 2–1–1 (0–1–1) |
| October 19 | 7:07 | at #9 Ohio State | #8 | Ohio State University Ice Rink • Columbus, OH | Hanlon | W 7–4 | 333 | 3–1–1 (1–1–1) |
| October 20 | 7:07 | at #9 Ohio State | #8 | Ohio State University Ice Rink • Columbus, OH | Hanlon | L 1–4 | 331 | 3–2–1 (1–2–1) |
| October 26 | 6:07 | Minnesota Duluth | | Ridder Arena • Minneapolis, MN | Lura | W 3–1 | 1,067 | 4–2–1 (2–2–1) |
| October 27 | 3:12 | Minnesota Duluth | | Ridder Arena • Minneapolis, MN | Lura | W 5–1 | 1,341 | 5–2–1 (3–2–1) |
| November 2 | 2:07 | at #1 Wisconsin | #6 | Kohl Center • Madison, WI | Lura | L 0–3 | 1,389 | 5–3–1 (3–3–1) |
| November 3 | 2:07 | at #1 Wisconsin | #6 | Kohl Center • Madison, WI | Lura | W 3–2 | 2,404 | 6–3–1 (4–3–1) |
| November 17 | 3:37 | at #4 Minnesota Duluth | #6 | Duluth Entertainment Convention Center • Duluth, MN | Lura | L 0–5 | 1,048 | 6–4–1 (4–4–1) |
| November 18 | 3:07 | at #4 Minnesota Duluth | #6 | Duluth Entertainment Convention Center • Duluth, MN | Hanlon | W 3–0 | 833 | 7–4–1 (5–4–1) |
| November 24 | 3:07 | North Dakota | #6 | Ridder Arena • Minneapolis, MN | Hanlon | W 5–1 | 1,372 | 8–4–1 (6–4–1) |
| November 25 | 3:07 | North Dakota | #6 | Ridder Arena • Minneapolis, MN | Lura | W 5–3 | 1,126 | 9–4–1 (7–4–1) |
| November 30 | 6:07 | Bemidji State | #6 | Ridder Arena • Minneapolis, MN | Hanlon | W 5–0 | 1,269 | 10–4–1 (8–4–1) |
| December 1 | 3:07 | Bemidji State | #6 | Ridder Arena • Minneapolis, MN | Lura | W 1–0 | 1,116 | 11–4–1 (9–4–1) |
| December 7 | 7:07 | at Minnesota State | #5 | Alltel Center • Mankato, MN | Hanlon | W 6–0 | 250 | 12–4–1 (10–4–1) |
| December 8 | 3:07 | at Minnesota State | #5 | Alltel Center • Mankato, MN | Lura | W 1–0 | 317 | 13–4–1 (11–4–1) |
| January 5 | 1:00 | at Wayne State* | #4 | City Sports Ice Arena • Detroit, MI | Hanlon | W 6–3 | 184 | 14–4–1 (11–4–1) |
| January 6 | 1:00 | at Wayne State* | #4 | City Sports Ice Arena • Detroit, MI | Lura | T 3–3 ^{OT} | 192 | 14–4–2 (11–4–1) |
| January 12 | 1:00 | Boston College* | #5 | Ridder Arena • Minneapolis, MN | Hanlon | T 2–2 ^{OT} | 1,734 | 14–4–3 (11–4–1) |
| January 13 | 1:07 | Boston College* | #5 | Ridder Arena • Minneapolis, MN | Lura | W 2–1 | 2,053 | 15–4–3 (11–4–1) |
| January 18 | 7:07 | at North Dakota | #4 | Ralph Engelstad Arena • Grand Forks, ND | Hanlon | W 4–1 | 1,031 | 16–4–3 (12–4–1) |
| January 19 | 4:07 | at North Dakota | #4 | Ralph Engelstad Arena • Grand Forks, ND | Lura | W 2–1 | 539 | 17–4–3 (13–4–1) |
| January 25 | 7:07 | Minnesota State | #4 | Ridder Arena • Minneapolis, MN | Hanlon | W 3–1 | 1,395 | 18–4–3 (14–4–1) |
| January 26 | 7:07 | Minnesota State | #4 | Ridder Arena • Minneapolis, MN | Hanlon | W 4–3 | 1,492 | 19–4–3 (15–4–1) |
| February 1 | 2:07 | at Bemidji State | | John S. Glas Field House • Bemidji, MN | Hanlon | W 5–1 | 180 | 20–4–3 (16–4–1) |
| February 2 | 2:07 | at Bemidji State | | John S. Glas Field House • Bemidji, MN | Hanlon | W 4–1 | 173 | 21–4–3 (17–4–1) |
| February 8 | 7:07 | Ohio State | #4 | Ridder Arena • Minneapolis, MN | Hanlon | W 7–3 | 1,227 | 22–4–3 (18–4–1) |
| February 9 | 7:07 | Ohio State | #4 | Ridder Arena • Minneapolis, MN | Hanlon | W 5–1 | 1,314 | 23–4–3 (19–4–1) |
| February 15 | 7:07 | at St. Cloud State | #4 | Herb Brooks National Hockey Center • St. Cloud, MN | Hanlon | W 4–2 | 507 | 24–4–3 (20–4–1) |
| February 16 | 7:07 | St. Cloud State | #4 | Ridder Arena • Minneapolis, MN | Lura | W 5–2 | 1,588 | 25–4–3 (21–4–1) |
| February 23 | 4:07 | #5 Wisconsin | #4 | Ridder Arena • Minneapolis, MN | Hanlon | L 1–5 | 2,823 | 25–5–3 (21–5–1) |
| February 24 | 3:07 | #5 Wisconsin | #4 | Ridder Arena • Minneapolis, MN | Lura | T 2–2 ^{OT} | 2,131 | 25–5–4 (21–5–2) |
WCHA Tournament
| February 29 | 7:07 | North Dakota* | #4 | Ridder Arena • Minneapolis, MN (WCHA First Round, Game 1) | Hanlon | W 3–1 | 574 | 26–5–4 (21–5–2) |
| March 1 | 7:07 | North Dakota* | #4 | Ridder Arena • Minneapolis, MN (WCHA First Round, Game 2) | Hanlon | W 9–0 | 921 | 27–5–4 (21–5–2) |
| March 8 | 4:07 | vs. #5 Wisconsin* | #4 | Duluth Entertainment Convention Center • Duluth, MN (WCHA Semifinals) | Hanlon | L 3–4 | 1,688 | 27–6–4 (21–5–2) |
NCAA Tournament
| March 15 | 7:00 | #5 Wisconsin* | #4 | Ridder Arena • Minneapolis, MN (NCAA National Quarterfinals) | Lura | L 2–3 ^{OT} | 1,458 | 27–7–4 (21–5–2) |
*Non-conference game. ^{#}Rankings from USCHO.com Poll.

=== News and notes ===
The Gopher power play (which included Gigi Marvin and Rachael Drazan), ranked first in the WCHA and third in the nation with a 24.5 conversion percentage. Gigi Marvin led the league in power-play points with 24.

- Kelli Blankenship was in her sophomore season. She produced four goals and seven assists for 11 points. In the opening weekend of the season (October 16), she had an assist in the 4–2 win over Boston University. On October 19, she scored a goal and an assist in the 7–4 win over Ohio State. She held a season-high three-game scoring streak with points against Bemidji State and Ohio State (on February 1, 2 and 8).
- Rachael Drazan was paired with Anya Miller the entire 2007–08 season. She ranked fifth in scoring and second among defensemen when she scored 10 goals and 17 assists for 27 points. She scored five game-winning goals, seven power-play goals and a short-handed goal in her junior campaign.

On the power play, Drazan tied for third in the conference in power-play points with 13. Her first points as a Gopher came in a game against Northeastern on October 5. She had a goal and an assist. On November 3, she scored a goal and an assist in the Gophers' 3–2 victory over Wisconsin. From Nov. 18 – Jan 5, Drazan held a season-high eight-game scoring streak. During said streak, she notched nine points. She set a career-best three points in the 7–3 defeat of Ohio State on February 8.

- Melanie Gagnon was in her junior season. She appeared 35 games and scored three goals and 11 assists for 14 points, while earning her third letter. She started the season with an assist against Northeastern and against Boston University on October 5 and 6. In a 7–4 win over Ohio State on October 19, she tied a career-high three assists. She scored her first goal of the year on November 30 in a 5–0 win over Bemidji State. In a game played on February 1, which was a 5–1 defeat over North Dakota, she netted a power play goal. (2/1).
- Goaltender Jenny Lura was in her freshman season and played in 16 games, while accumulating a 10–4–2 record with two shutouts. In the process, she earned her first letter and was named to the WCHA All-Rookie Team. Statistically, she held a 1.92 goals against average and a .910 save percentage. Lura earned her first career start in the come-from-behind win over Boston University on October 6. On October 26 and 27, she got back-to-back wins over then No. 1 Minnesota Duluth and only allowed two goals during the series. Lura earned her first career shutout on December 1 with a 1–0 decision against Bemidji State. The following week, she added her second-straight shutout in a 1–0 win against Minnesota State. On January 13, she helped the Gophers to a 2–1 win over tenth ranked Boston College.
- Gigi Marvin was in her junior season with the Golden Gophers. She played in all 38 games for the Gophers and led the team with 54 points. She was second in WCHA league scoring with 38 points. Her 31 assists ranked first on the team, second in the WCHA and ninth in the nation (0.82 assists per game). She tied for third in the WCHA in goals scored with 23. During the season, she was a three-time WCHA Offensive Player of the Week. In addition, she started the season with a five-game scoring streak.

Marvin tallied two assists in wins over Northeastern (10/5) and against then-No. 1 ranked Minnesota Duluth (10/27). She also had four-point performances against Bemidji State (11/30) and Minnesota State (12/7). On February 8, Marvin scored two goals and two assists in three shots in the 7–3 win over Ohio State. The following day, she had a three-point performance against the Buckeyes for a season-high seven points in the series sweep. In the 5–0 win over Bemidji State on November 30, Marvin established her 100th-career point. At season's end, she had 57 goals and 81 assists for 138 points in 114 games played. From Jan. 18 – Feb 16, she held a 10-game scoring streak from and produced 19 point.

- Dagney Willey was in her junior season and appeared in all 38 games and earned her third letter. Of her nine assists on the season, four came on the power play. She set up a power-play goal and an even strength goal in the 5–0 won over Bemidji State on November 30. She tallied two power-play assists in the 6–3 win against Wayne State on January 5.

=== Roster ===
| No. | Nat. | Player | Class | Pos | Height | DoB | Hometown | Previous team |
|---|---|---|---|---|---|---|---|---|
| 1 | | Jenny Lura | Freshman | G | 5' 8" (1.73 m) | 1989-09-07 | North Vancouver, British Columbia | Sentinel Secondary School |
| 2 | | Whitney Graft | Senior | F | 5' 4" (1.63 m) | | Wayzata, Minnesota | Wayzata High School |
| 3 | | Melanie Gagnon | Junior | D | 5' 5" (1.65 m) | 1986-06-11 | St. Adolphe, Manitoba | St. Norbert Collegiate High School |
| 5 | | Laura May | Freshman | F | 5' 8" (1.73 m) | 1989-08-05 | Dellwood, Minnesota | Mahtomedi High School |
| 6 | | Rachael Drazan | Junior | D | 5' 6" (1.68 m) | 1986-01-11 | Orono, Minnesota | Benilde-St. Margaret's |
| 7 | | Kelli Blankenship | Sophomore | F | 5' 6" (1.68 m) | 1987-06-23 | Lusby, Maryland | North American Hockey Academy |
| 8 | | Bobbi Ross | Senior | F | 5' 7" (1.7 m) | | Verwood, Saskatchewan | Collège Mathieu |
| 9 | | Jaimie Horton | Freshman | F | 5' 7" (1.7 m) | 1988-04-24 | Maple Grove, Minnesota | Maple Grove High School |
| 10 | | Brittany Francis | Sophomore | F | 5' 7" (1.7 m) | 1987-12-02 | Thunder Bay, Ontario | Toronto Jr. Aeros |
| 15 | | Anya Miller | Senior | D | 5' 8" (1.73 m) | | Elk River, Minnesota | Elk River High School |
| 16 | | Jenelle Philipczyk | Senior | F | 5' 5" (1.65 m) | | Woodbury, Minnesota | Eagan High School |
| 17 | | Emily West | Freshman | F | 5' 5" (1.65 m) | 1989-03-22 | Colorado Springs, Colorado | Pine Creek High School |
| 19 | | Gigi Marvin | Junior | F | 5' 8" (1.73 m) | 1987-03-07 | Warroad, Minnesota | Warroad High School |
| 20 | | Alexandra Zebro | Sophomore | D | 6' 0" (1.83 m) | 1988-06-16 | Oak Grove, Minnesota | Faithful Family Academy |
| 22 | | Erica McKenzie | Senior | F | 5' 8" (1.73 m) | | Hastings, Minnesota | Hastings High School |
| 23 | | Dagney Willey | Junior | D | 5' 5" (1.65 m) | | Maple Grove, Minnesota | Osseo Senior High School |
| 24 | | Jen Schoullis | Freshman | F | 5' 9" (1.75 m) | 1989-03-07 | Erie, Pennsylvania | Shattuck-Saint Mary's |
| 25 | | Terra Rasmussen | Freshman | F | 5' 7" (1.7 m) | 1988-09-04 | Coon Rapids, Minnesota | Coon Rapids High School |
| 26 | | Michelle Maunu | Sophomore | D | 5' 6" (1.68 m) | 1987-07-15 | Esko, Minnesota | Esko High School |
| 30 | | Savannah Osborn | Freshman | G | 5' 7" (1.7 m) | | Bemidji, Minnesota | Bemidji High School |
| 39 | | Kim Hanlon | Junior | G | 5' 6" (1.68 m) | | Blaine, Minnesota | Blaine High School |

== Postseason ==
- WCHA First Round playoffs
  - Gigi Marvin contributed five points in the sweep over North Dakota
- WCHA Final Face-off
  - Gigi Marvin scored two goals against Wisconsin
  - Dagney Willey held an assist in the Gophers’ WCHA FINAL FACEOFF game against Wisconsin on March 8

== International competition ==
- Rachael Drazan and Gigi Marvin went on to compete with the United States at the 2008 IIHF World Championships. Both earned a gold medal when the team defeated Canada.
- Melanie Gagnon was a member of the Canadian Under-22 Team for the fifth-straight year.

== Awards and honors ==
- Kelli Blankenship, WCHA All-Academic
- Kelli Blankenship, Academic All-Big Ten
- Rachael Drazan, First Team All-WCHA
- Rachael Drazan, WCHA All-Academic honoree
- Rachael Drazan, Academic All-Big Ten honoree
- Rachael Drazan, ranked second in the WCHA in points by a defensemen with 22 points
- Melanie Gagnon, Third-team All-WCHA honoree
- Melanie Gagnon, Academic All-WCHA
- Melanie Gagnon, Academic Big Ten selection
- Jenny Lura, WCHA All-Rooke Team
- Jenny Lura, WCHA Rookie of the Week (Week of October 28)
- Gigi Marvin led WCHA in power-play points with 24.
- Gigi Marvin, Second-Team All-American
- Gigi Marvin, Patty Kazmaier Top 10 finalist
- Gigi Marvin, First Team All-WCHA for the second straight year
- Gigi Marvin, WCHA Scholar Athlete and WCHA All-Academic selection
- Gigi Marvin, WCHA Final Face-Off All-Tournament Team
- Gigi Marvin, Named the team's most valuable player for the second straight season with teammate Bobbi Ross
- Gigi Marvin, Earned team's Highest GPA award
- Dagney Willey, WCHA All-Academic honoree
- Dagney Willey, Academic All-Big Ten honoree
