= Kerry Weiland =

American ice hockey player

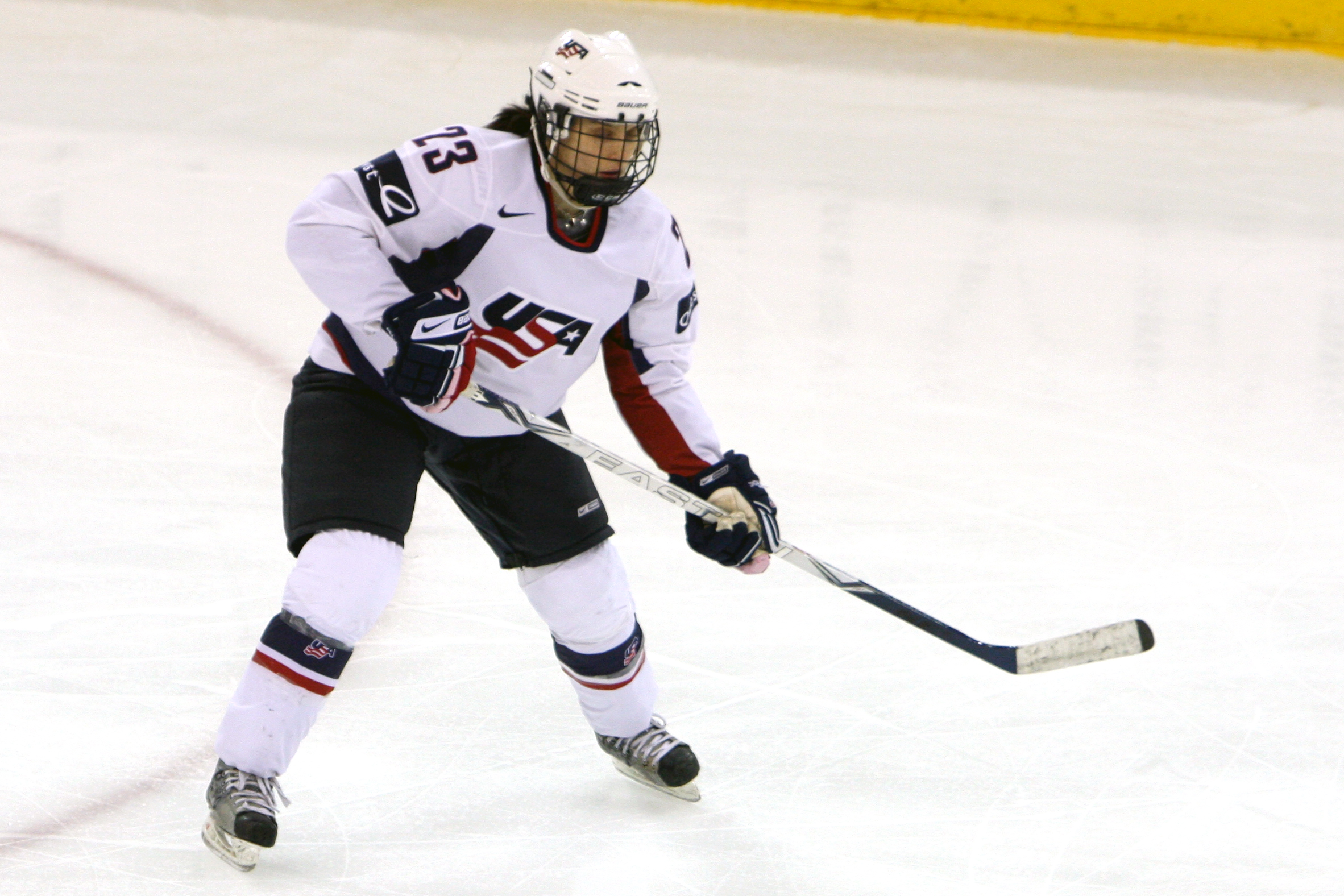
- Weiland with Team USA in 2010
- Born: October 18, 1980 (age 46) Palmer, Alaska, U.S.
- Height: 5 ft 4 in (163 cm)
- Weight: 142 lb (64 kg; 10 st 2 lb)
- Position: Defense
- Shot: Left
- Played for: Wisconsin Badgers; Edmonton Chimos; Brampton Thunder; DHC Lyss; Vaughan Flames
- National team: United States
- Playing career: 1999–2010
Medal record
Women's ice hockey
Olympic Games
Silver medal – second place	2010 Vancouver	Ice hockey
World Championship
Gold medal – first place	2008 China
Gold medal – first place	2009 Finland
Silver medal – second place	2007 Canada
Silver medal – second place	2004 Canada
Representing United States
Women's in-line hockey
World Championship
Gold medal – first place	2003 Czechia
Gold medal – first place	2006 United States
Gold medal – first place	2007 Spain
Silver medal – second place	2004 Canada

Kerry Pauline Weiland Sorbara (née Weiland; born October 18, 1980) is an American former professional ice hockey and inline hockey player, a defenseman. As a member of the United States women's national ice hockey team, she won four IIHF Women's World Championship medals and a silver medal in the 2010 Olympic women's ice hockey tournament.

== Playing career ==
As a child, Weiland began skating and playing pickup games on her family’s farm. At age five, she followed her older brother when he began playing organized ice hockey with the Matanuska Amateur Hockey Association at the local rink in Wasilla, Alaska and played exclusively on boys' teams until she was thirteen. She played on boys' and girls' teams throughout her teens, including four seasons with the boys' varsity team of her high school, Palmer High School. With the Palmer High Moose boys' team, she became the first female player to earn first-team all-region honors in Alaska prep league history.

=== NCAA ===
Her college ice hockey career began in the fall of 1999 with the Wisconsin Badgers women's ice hockey program in the Western Collegiate Hockey Association (WCHA) conference of the NCAA Division I. The 1999–2000 season was the inaugural season of both the WCHA women's conference and the Badgers women's ice hockey program. Over half of the team were first-year players like Weiland and her fellow freshmen included future US national team goaltender Chanda Gunn and defenseman, Sis Paulsen, the future Director of Hockey Operations for the Badgers women's program.

In her first season, Weiland ranked fifth on the team for scoring, tallying 10 goals and 35 points in 33 games, and recorded the best plus–minus of all Badger defensemen, with +7. During the Wisconsin Badgers program’s second game on October 9, 1999, in which they faced the Minnesota Duluth Bulldogs, she set the WCHA all-time records for most penalties and most penalty minutes issued in a single game, with eight penalties and 24 penalty minutes; the records remain untouched as of September 2022. At the end of the season, Weiland was named to the All-WCHA Second Team and was awarded the team’s Most Inspirational Player award and Defensive Player of the Year award.

Named alongside captain Sis Paulsen in their sophomore season, Weiland served as an alternate captain during her last three seasons with the Badgers. The 2000–01 season, the inaugural NCAA Division I women's ice hockey season, was her most offensively productive and she led all defensemen in the country with 49 points (12 goals+37 assists), which set the still-standing Badger program record for most points by a defensive player in a season. Her 37 assists in that season tied for most assists by a defender in a WCHA season with Minnesota Golden Gophers defenseman Winny Brodt’s total from 1999–2000 (their record stood until 2006–07, when it was broken by Meaghan Mikkelson). Her 38 penalties and 76 penalty minutes took second place in the Badger record book behind Sis Paulson’s 40 penalties and 91 penalty minutes from the 1999–2000 season and both currently sit at third, behind Paulson and Lindsay Macy (2003–04). Weiland and Badger teammate Meghan Hunter were both named to the 2001 AHCA All-American Second Team and the 2001 All-WCHA First Team.

The 2001–02 season saw Weiland play a less offensively driven role due to the addition of first-year defensemen Molly Engstrom and Carla MacLeod, who were able to provide additional production from the blue line – though she still recorded 22 points and ranked sixth on the team in scoring. Her junior season featured the highest plus–minus rating (+20) and the fewest penalty minutes (36 PIM) of her college career and was capped by her selection to the 2002 AHCA All-American First Team, becoming the first Badger to earn selection to the top All-American team.

=== Post-collegiate ===
Following her graduation, Weiland joined the Edmonton Chimos of the Canadian National Women's Hockey League (NWHL) for one regular season and two playoff games in the 2003–04 season before playing the full 2004–05 NWHL season with the Brampton Thunder. During that time, she also participated in the Esso Women's Nationals with the Chimos (as Team Alberta) in 2004 and with the Thunder competing as (Team Ontario 2) in 2005.

Weiland chose to go abroad after being cut from the 2006 US Olympic team and signed with the Swiss team DHC Lyss in the Leistungsklasse A (LK A) for the 2005–06 season. She ranked second on the team and ninth in the league for scoring, with 16 goals and 11 assists. In addition to playing in the top Swiss league, she served as an assistant coach to the Switzerland women's national under-18 ice hockey team for the 2005–06 season. During her spare time while living in Europe, she visited fourteen countries.

Returning to North America in 2006, Weiland joined the Etobicoke Dolphins for the 2006–07 NWHL season and remained with the team as it became the Vaughan Flames and joined the Canadian Women's Hockey League (CWHL) in its inaugural season, 2007–08. She participated in the Esso Women's Nationals in 2007 with the Vaughan Flames (as Team Ontario 2) and served as an alternate captain.

== International play ==
Weiland was first invited to participate in the USA Hockey Women's National Festival in 1999 and took part in a total of eight festivals (1999, 2002–2005, and 2007–2009). Her first national team selection was to the United States women's national select team (also known as the national development team) for the 2002 Four Nations Cup in Canada, at which she won a silver medal. She won gold with the national select team at the 2003 Four Nations Cup in Sweden and was named to the United States national team roster for the 2003 IIHF Women's World Championship in Beijing before the tournament was cancelled due to the SARS crisis.

A year later, she made her World Championship debut with the national team playing on the second pair with Molly Engstrom at the 2004 IIHF Women's World Championship in Halifax, Nova Scotia, where she was +8 across five games and won a silver medal, and also took home silver from the 2004 Four Nations Cup in the United States. She was not named to the national team nor the national select team for any tournaments in 2005 and, though she was a prospect for the 2006 United States Olympic team, was cut early in the selection process. Of the conversation when she was cut, she recalled being told that, while she was undeniably skilled, the opportunity was being given to younger players (she was 25 at the time).

After being cut from the Olympic squad, Weiland considered retiring from ice hockey altogether but instead decided to pause her national team aspirations and signed to play in Switzerland for the 2005–06 season. While in Switzerland, she attended various competitions at the 2006 Winter Olympics in Turin, including short track speed skating, curling, biathlon, and several matches of the women's ice hockey tournament.

Upon returning to North America, she caught the 2006 Four Nations Cup on television and realized that she still wanted to pursue her Olympic dreams. Weiland contacted the director of the US national team and was invited to a camp in December 2006, where she was able to try out for the upcoming World Championship team. She made the US roster for the 2007 World Championship and began what she dubbed "a new era and a clean slate" with the national program.

Weiland kicked off her new era at the 2007 IIHF Women's World Championship in Winnipeg, where she played on the third pair with Helen Resor, notched her first World Championship point – the secondary assist on an Engstrom goal against Finland, and won her second World Championship silver medal. Later that year, she won her third Four Nations Cup silver medal at the 2007 Four Nations Cup in Sweden.

In 2008, she relocated to Blaine, Minnesota to participate in the newly established USA Hockey residency program and began renting a flat with forwards Julie Chu and Karen Thatcher. At the 2008 IIHF Women's World Championship, Weiland was on a defensive pair with Chu, who played as a defenseman rather than at forward for the tournament, and took home her first World Championship gold medal. The United States also won gold at the 2008 Four Nations Cup, where Weiland contributed two assists.

She won a second World Championship gold medal as the team’s seventh defenseman at the 2009 IIHF Women's World Championship and notched an assist at the 2009 Four Nations Cup, where the United States took home silver.

Weiland’s Olympic dreams were finally realized in December 2009, when she was announced to the United States' team for the women's ice hockey tournament at the 2010 Winter Olympics in Vancouver. At 29, she was the third-oldest player named to the roster, after 30 year old forward Jenny Potter and 29 year old defenseman Angela Ruggiero (born January 1980). Deployed alongside Kacey Bellamy on the third defensive pair, she earned the secondary assist on a Natalie Darwitz goal against China and scored her first national team goal against Sweden, assisted by Erika Lawler. When the United States fell to Canada in the goal medal game, she became the second Alaskan to win an Olympic ice hockey medal, after goaltender Pam Dreyer won bronze in 2006.

=== Inline hockey ===
Weiland participated in four FIRS Inline Hockey World Championships with the United States women's national inline hockey team. winning gold medals in 2003, 2006, and 2007, and a silver medal in 2004. Several national ice hockey team players were Weiland’s teammates on the national inline hockey team, including Chanda Gunn (2003, 2004), Jess Koizumi (2006, 2007), Julie Chu (2007), and Angela Ruggiero (2007).

== Personal life ==
Weiland was born on October 18, 1980, the second youngest child of Terry and Teri Weiland. She grew up with four older sisters (Annemarie, Amy, Sarah, and Alicia) and two brothers on the family’s hay farm outside of Palmer, Alaska. Her older brother, Andy, was friends with future-NHLer Scott Gomez during the years he lived in Palmer as a youth and Gomez remembered Weiland as "respectful and quiet - but on the ice, she wasn't scared of anything."

She attended the University of Wisconsin–Madison on a full athletic scholarship, double majoring in legal studies and sociology, and graduated in 2003.

Though she played ice hockey in some of the elite women's leagues of the time, Weiland spent years of her playing career living "below the poverty line" and often relied on financial help from her family and intermittent jobs to stay afloat.

Weiland is divorced from Christina Sorbara, a former member of the Canadian women's national inline hockey team, and they have three children; the eldest was born in 2012 and they welcomed twins in December 2013.

A street in Palmer, Alaska is named after her. Called Kerry Weiland Court, the road serves as the address for MTA Events Center (also known as Palmer Ice Arena), the town’s only indoor ice rink.

== Career statistics ==
=== Regular season and playoffs ===
			Regular season					Playoffs
Season	Team	League	GP	G	A	Pts	PIM	GP	G	A	Pts	PIM
1999-2000	Wisconsin Badgers	NCAA	33	10	25	35	72	—	—	—	—	—
2000-01	Wisconsin Badgers	NCAA	35	12	37	49	76	—	—	—	—	—
2001-02	Wisconsin Badgers	NCAA	33	8	14	22	36	—	—	—	—	—
2002-03	Wisconsin Badgers	NCAA	32	4	14	18	65	—	—	—	—	—
2003-04	Edmonton Chimos	NWHL	1					2
2004-05	Brampton Thunder	NWHL	30	6	18	24	32	—	—	—	—	—
2005-06	DHC Lyss	LK A		16	11	27
2006-07	Etobicoke Dolphins	NWHL
2007-08	Vaughan Flames	CWHL	15	8	3	11	20	2	0	1	1	0
NCAA totals			133	34	90	124	249	–	–	–	–	–

=== International ===
Year	Team	Event	Result	GP	G	A	Pts	+/–	PIM
2004	United States	WW	2nd place, silver medalist(s)	5	0	0	0	+8	2
2007	United States	WW	2nd place, silver medalist(s)	5	0	1	1	+5	2
2008	United States	WW	1st place, gold medalist(s)	5	0	0	0	+1	6
2009	United States	WW	1st place, gold medalist(s)	5	0	0	0	+3	2
2010	United States	OG	2nd place, silver medalist(s)	5	1	1	2	+6	4
Totals				25	1	2	3	+23	16

== Awards and honors ==
Award	Year
International
World Championship Silver Medal	2004, 2007
World Championship Gold Medal	2008, 2009
Olympic Silver Medal	2010
Wisconsin Badgers
All-WCHA Second Team	1999–2000, 2002–03
Badgers Most Inspirational Player Award (Note: Renamed the Badger Award in 2001)	1999–2000
AHCA All-American Second Team	2000–01
All-WCHA First Team	2000–01, 2001–02
All-WCHA All-Academic	2000–01, 2001–02, 2002–03
All-Big Ten All-Academic	2000–01, 2001–02
WCHA Player of the Week	Week of February 18, 2001
Badgers Defensive Player of the Year	2000–01, 2001–02 (Note: Co-winner with Carla MacLeod in 2001–02)
WCHA All-Star Team	2001
AHCA All-American First Team	2001–02
CoSIDA Academic All-District 5 First Team	2001–02
UW Athletic Board Scholar	2001–02
WCHA All-Tournament Team	2002
UW Athletic Hall of Fame	2015

== Records ==
=== WCHA ===
Records valid through 2021–22 NCAA season.

Career

- 4th most assists by a defender (90) – tied with Courtney Burke
- 6th most points by a defender (124)
- 9th most goals by a defender (34) – tied with Emma Laaksonen and Rachel Ramsey

Season

- 3rd most assists by a defender (37), 2000–01 season – tied with Winny Brodt (1999–2000), Megan Bozek (2012–13), and Sophie Jaques (2021–22)
- 5th most points by a defender (49), 2000–01 season – tied with Meaghan Mikkelson (2006–07)
- 5th most points per game by a defender (1.40), 2000–01 season; 22nd most points per game by a defender (1.06), 1999–2000 season
- 20th most goals by a defender (12), 2000–01 season – tied with five other players: Bobbi-Jo Slusar (2005–06), Anya Miller (2007–08), Anne Schleper (2009–10), Rachel Ramsey (2013–14), and Sydney Baldwin (2017–18)

Single-game

- Most penalties (8), Wisconsin vs. Minnesota Duluth on October 9, 1999
- Most penalty minutes (24 PIM), Wisconsin vs. Minnesota Duluth on October 9, 1999

=== Wisconsin Badgers ===
Records valid through 2020–21 Wisconsin Badgers women's ice hockey season.

Career

- Most penalties (111) – tied with Sis Paulsen
- Most penalty minutes (249 PIM)
- 2nd most points scored by a defensive player (124)
- 18th most points scored (124)

Season

- Most points scored by a defensive player (49), 2000–01 season – tied with Meaghan Mikkelson (2006–07); 6th most points scored by a defensive player (35), 1999–2000 – tied with Courtney Burke (2015–16)
- 3rd most penalties (38), 2000–01 season; 4th most penalties (32), 1999–2000 season
- 3rd most penalty minutes (76), 2000–01 season; 4th most penalty minutes (72), 1999–2000 season; 7th most penalty minutes (65), 2002–03 season

Single-game

- Most penalties (8), Wisconsin vs. Minnesota Duluth on October 9, 1999
- Most penalty minutes (24 PIM), Wisconsin vs. Minnesota Duluth on October 9, 1999
