= Wisconsin Hockey Hall of Fame =

Hockey museum

Coordinates: 45°54′39″N 089°12′49″W

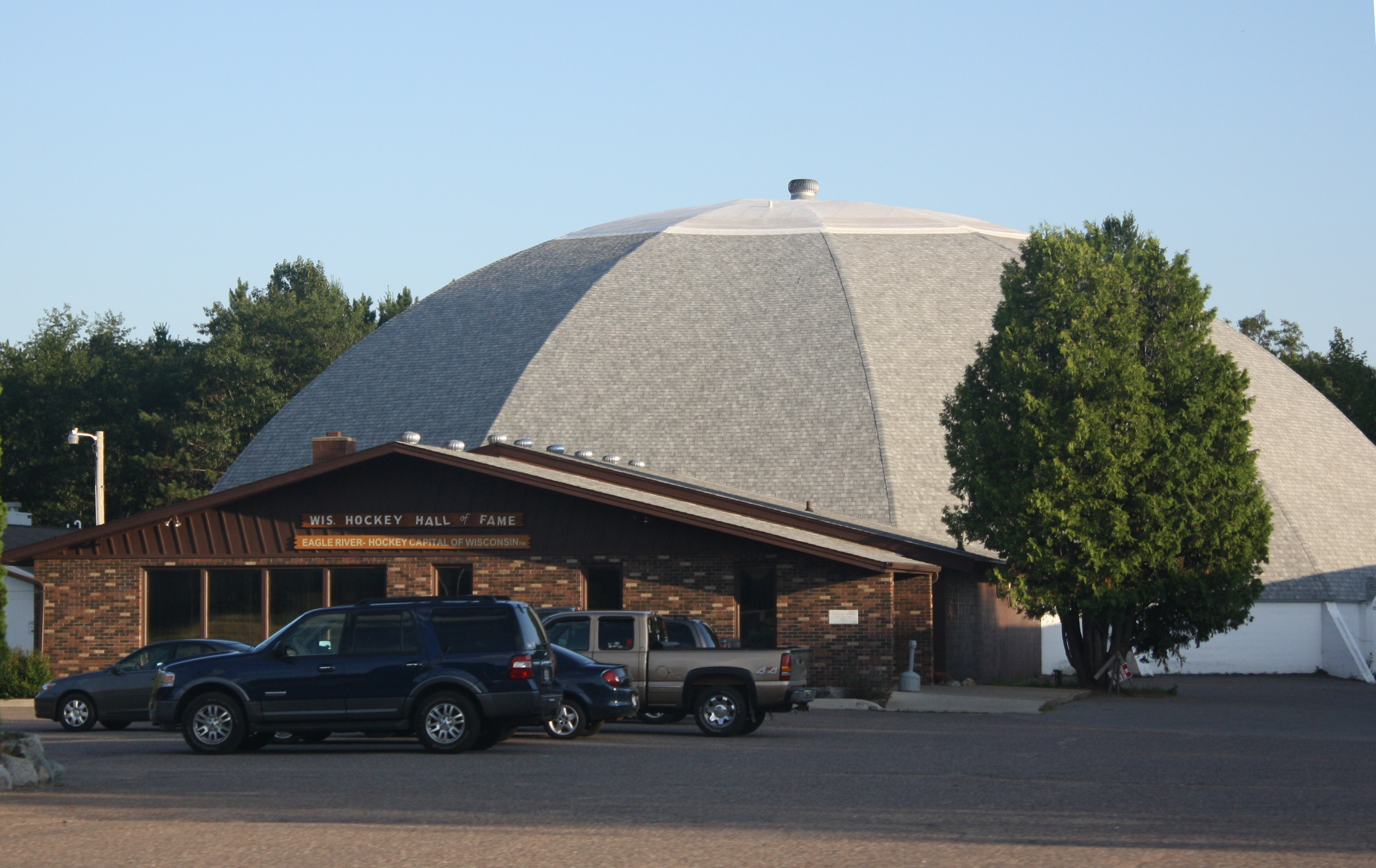
The Wisconsin Hockey Hall of Fame at the Eagle River Stadium.

The Wisconsin Hockey Hall of Fame which is located in Eagle River, Wisconsin, was founded in 1975 and is housed in the Eagle River Sports Arena. The hall was established to honor outstanding individuals responsible for the development, growth and success of amateur ice hockey in the State of Wisconsin.

The Hall is open daily from 9:00 am to 5:00 pm. During the season it opens and closes when the rink does which is usually before 9:00 am and after 5:00 pm.

== Notable Inductees ==
- Jeff Sauer - 2004
- Craig Ludwig - 2002
- Mark Johnson - 2001
- Bob Suter - 2001
- John Mayasich - 1989
- Bob Johnson- 1987

== See also ==
- United States Hockey Hall of Fame
- Wisconsin Athletic Walk of Fame
