= Mark Johnson (ice hockey) =

American ice hockey player and coach (born 1957)

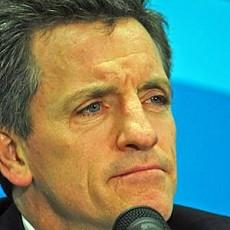
- Johnson at the 2010 Winter Olympics
- Born: September 22, 1957 (age 69) Minneapolis, Minnesota, U.S.
- Height: 5 ft 9 in (175 cm)
- Weight: 170 lb (77 kg; 12 st 2 lb)
- Position: Center
- Shot: Left
- Played for: Pittsburgh Penguins; Minnesota North Stars; Hartford Whalers; St. Louis Blues; New Jersey Devils
- National team: United States
- NHL draft: 66th overall, 1977; Pittsburgh Penguins
- WHA draft: 22nd overall, 1977; Birmingham Bulls
- Playing career: 1979–1992
- Coaching career

Current position
- Title: Head Coach
- Team: Wisconsin
- Conference: WCHA

Biographical details
- Education: University of Wisconsin

Playing career
- 1976–1979: Wisconsin
- Position: Center

Coaching career (HC unless noted)
- 1995–1996: Madison Monsters
- 1996–2002: Wisconsin men's (Asst.)
- 2000: Team USA men's (Asst.)
- 2002: Team USA men's (Asst.)
- 2002–present: Wisconsin women's
- 2010: Team USA women's

Head coaching record
- Overall: 702–124–57 (.827) (College)

Accomplishments and honors

Championships
- 9× National Champion (2006, 2007, 2009, 2011, 2019, 2021, 2023, 2025, 2026); 11× WCHA regular season champion (2006, 2007, 2011, 2012, 2016, 2017, 2018, 2020, 2021, 2025, 2026); 10× WCHA tournament champion (2006, 2007, 2009, 2011, 2015, 2016, 2017, 2019, 2021, 2025)

Awards
- 5× AHCA Coach of the Year (2006, 2007, 2009, 2011, 2025); 11× WCHA Coach of the Year (2003, 2006, 2007, 2009, 2011, 2012, 2016, 2019, 2021, 2025, 2026)
Medal record
Representing the United States
Olympic Games
Men's ice hockey
Gold medal – first place	1980 Lake Placid	Team competition
Coach for women's ice hockey
Silver medal – second place	2010 Vancouver	Team competition

Mark Einar Johnson (born September 22, 1957) is an American ice hockey coach for the University of Wisconsin–Madison women's ice hockey team. He is a former National Hockey League (NHL) player who appeared in 669 NHL regular season games between 1980 and 1990. He also played for the gold medal-winning 1980 U.S. Olympic team, leading the team in points with 11. As head coach of Wisconsin, he has led them to nine National Championships, the most for all NCAA Division I hockey teams (men's or women's teams). He is the son of legendary Wisconsin coach Bob Johnson, under whom he played while winning a national championship at the University of Wisconsin in 1977.

Johnson was inducted into the IIHF Hall of Fame in 1999, the Wisconsin Hockey Hall of Fame in 2001, the Wisconsin Athletic Hall of Fame in 2003, and the United States Hockey Hall of Fame in 2004. He received the Lester Patrick Trophy in 2011, for outstanding service to hockey in the United States.

== Playing career ==
=== Amateur career ===
As a teenager, Johnson attended James Madison Memorial High School in Madison, Wisconsin, where he was on the hockey team. He then played for the University of Wisconsin–Madison ice hockey team for three years under his father, legendary coach Bob Johnson. In 1977, during his first year at the university, he helped the Badgers win the NCAA national championship. He was the first Badger to win the WCHA Rookie of the year. He went on to become the school's leading goal scorer and second all-time scorer. Johnson was also a two time All-American. His younger brother, Peter, also played at the university.

=== International and professional career ===
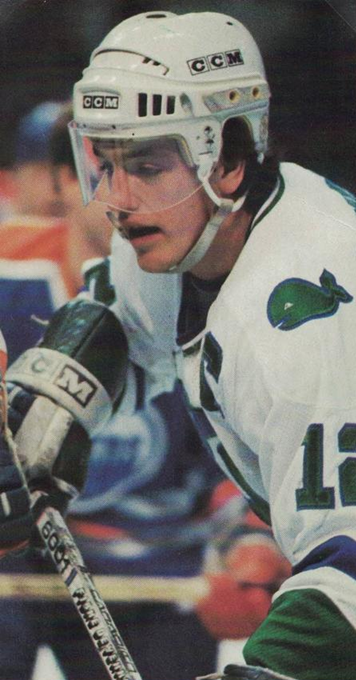
1984 photo of Johnson in action for Hartford Whalers

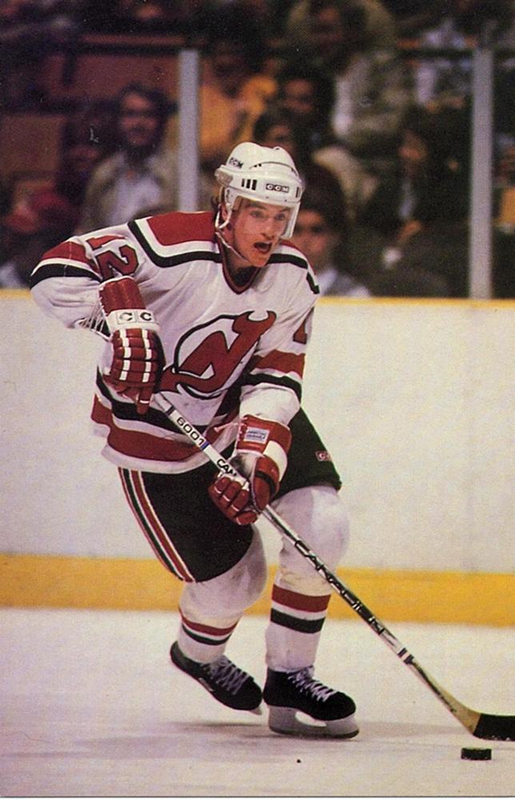
1985 postcard of Johnson for New Jersey Devils

Johnson made his international debut with the United States national team as an 18-year-old in 1976, when he played in 11 training games for the 1976 U.S. Olympic ice hockey team coached by his father. He represented the United States in 13 international tournaments (including the 1978, 1979, 1981, 1982, 1985, 1986, 1987, 1990 Ice Hockey World Championship tournaments and the 1981, 1984 and 1987 Canada Cup). He was a star player on the "Miracle on Ice" U.S. Olympic Hockey team at the 1980 Lake Placid winter games.

Playing for the United States against the Soviet Union, Johnson scored two of the four goals in the Team USA 4–3 victory. His first goal, scored with one second left in the game's first period, led to the Soviet coach taking out his goalie, Vladislav Tretiak, who was considered the best goalie in the world at the time; years later, when Johnson asked Soviet defenseman Slava Fetisov, now an NHL teammate, about the decision, he was simply told, "Coach crazy". He also scored in the third period to tie the game at 3–3. The team then defeated Finland to capture the gold medal, with Johnson assisting on the game-winning goal and scoring the insurance goal with less than four minutes remaining in the game. Johnson was named team MVP.

Johnson went on to play professional hockey in the NHL for the Pittsburgh Penguins, Minnesota North Stars, Hartford Whalers, St. Louis Blues, and New Jersey Devils. He played in the 1984 NHL All Star game as the Whalers representative and served as the Whalers' captain in 1983–85. He also played two seasons with Milan Saima SG in Italy and a final season in Austria before retiring in 1992. He briefly came out of retirement to play two games for Team USA in the 1998 Men's World Ice Hockey Championships qualifying tournament at the age of 41, where he helped Team USA retain its position in the World Championships' Pool A.

In 2010, thirty years after winning the Olympic gold medal as a player, Johnson coached the United States women's national ice hockey team, which won a silver medal in the Vancouver games.

On February 9, 2019, the University of Wisconsin retired #10 during a pre-game presentation at the Kohl Center. Johnson was the first Badgers hockey player to have his number retired.

== Personal life ==
Johnson has completed a B.A. degree in kinesiology at the University of Wisconsin in 1994. Johnson's son, Patrick, played for the men's hockey team at the University of Wisconsin–Madison. He coached his daughter, Mikayla, who played for the women's hockey team at the University of Wisconsin-Madison from 2013 to 2017. His son, Chris Johnson, played for the men's hockey team at Augsburg College, and now serves as an assistant coach on the Augsburg men's ice hockey team. His daughter, Meghan, played hockey for the women's team at Augsburg College from 2015 to 2019.

Michael Cummings played Johnson in the 1981 TV movie Miracle on Ice. Eric Peter-Kaiser portrayed him in the 2004 Disney film Miracle.

== Career statistics ==
=== Regular season and playoffs ===
			Regular season					Playoffs
Season	Team	League	GP	G	A	Pts	PIM	GP	G	A	Pts	PIM
1975–76	Madison Memorial High	HS-WI	30	65	56	121	—	—	—	—	—	—
1975–76	United States	Intl	11	5	6	11	0	—	—	—	—	—
1976–77	University of Wisconsin–Madison	WCHA	43	36	44	80	16	—	—	—	—	—
1977–78	University of Wisconsin–Madison	WCHA	42	48	38	86	24	—	—	—	—	—
1978–79	University of Wisconsin–Madison	WCHA	40	41	49	90	34	—	—	—	—	—
1979–80	United States	Intl	53	33	48	81	25	—	—	—	—	—
1979–80	Pittsburgh Penguins	NHL	17	3	5	8	4	5	2	2	4	0
1980–81	Pittsburgh Penguins	NHL	73	10	23	33	50	5	2	1	3	6
1981–82	Pittsburgh Penguins	NHL	46	10	11	21	30	—	—	—	—	—
1981–82	Minnesota North Stars	NHL	10	2	2	4	10	4	2	0	2	0
1982–83	Hartford Whalers	NHL	73	31	38	69	28	—	—	—	—	—
1983–84	Hartford Whalers	NHL	79	35	52	87	27	—	—	—	—	—
1984–85	Hartford Whalers	NHL	49	19	28	47	21	—	—	—	—	—
1984–85	St. Louis Blues	NHL	17	4	6	10	2	3	0	1	1	0
1985–86	New Jersey Devils	NHL	80	21	41	62	16	—	—	—	—	—
1986–87	New Jersey Devils	NHL	68	25	26	51	22	—	—	—	—	—
1987–88	New Jersey Devils	NHL	54	14	19	33	14	18	10	8	18	4
1988–89	New Jersey Devils	NHL	40	13	25	38	24	—	—	—	—	—
1989–90	New Jersey Devils	NHL	63	16	29	45	12	2	0	0	0	0
1990–91	Milan Saima SG	ITA	36	32	45	77	15	10	7	16	23	6
1991–92	Milan Saima SG	ITA	2	1	3	4	0	—	—	—	—	—
1991–92	Zell am See EK	Alpenliga	18	13	28	41	8	—	—	—	—	—
1991–92	Zell am See EK	AUT	15	10	21	31	6	—	—	—	—	—
NHL totals			669	203	305	508	260	37	16	12	28	10

=== International ===
Year	Team	Event	GP	G	A	Pts	PIM
1978	United States	WC	10	0	2	2	0
1979	United States	WC	2	0	0	0	0
1980	United States	OG	7	5	6	11	6
1981	United States	WC	5	0	2	2	2
1981	United States	CC	6	1	3	4	2
1982	United States	WC	7	1	1	2	6
1984	United States	CC	6	2	3	5	0
1985	United States	WC	10	4	1	5	6
1986	United States	WC	10	5	3	8	10
1987	United States	WC	10	3	6	9	8
1987	United States	CC	5	0	1	1	0
1990	United States	WC	9	2	3	5	2
Senior totals			87	23	31	54	42

== Awards and achievements ==
College

- WCHA Freshman of the Year (1977)
- All-WCHA First Team – 1978, 1979
- AHCA West All-American – 1978, 1979
- WCHA Most Valuable Player (1979)

NHL

- Played in NHL All-Star Game (1984)

Other

- Johnson was inducted into the IIHF Hall of Fame in 1999.
- Johnson was inducted into the Wisconsin Hockey Hall of Fame in 2001
- He was elected to the Wisconsin Athletic Hall of Fame in 2003
- Johnson was inducted into the United States Hockey Hall of Fame in 2004
- 2011 Lester Patrick Trophy for outstanding service to hockey in the United States

== Coaching career ==
Johnson is the head coach of the University of Wisconsin–Madison women's ice hockey team, a position he has held since 2002. The team won its first NCAA national championship on March 26, 2006. They repeated as national champions in 2007, 2009, 2011, 2019, 2021, 2023, 2025, and 2026.

On October 13, 2023, Johnson earned his 600th win as head coach of the Badgers. In a 9-0 win versus the MSU Mavericks, seven different Badgers scored as Johnson became the first coach to achieve 600 wins in NCAA women's ice hockey. Johnson became the first coach in NCAA women's hockey to reach 700 career wins, on March 15, 2026, during the NCAA Regional Final, with a win versus Quinnipiac.

Prior to coaching the women's team, Johnson was an assistant coach for the Wisconsin Badgers men's ice hockey team from 1996 until 2002.

He served as an assistant coach for the American national men's hockey team in 2000 and 2002. On July 6, 2006, he was named head coach of the American women's team as part of a general reorganization of the program, leading the women's hockey team to a silver medal at the 2010 Olympics.

Johnson coached the Madison Monsters minor league hockey team during their inaugural 1995–96 season.

Record table
Season	Team	Overall	Conference	Standing	Postseason
Wisconsin Badgers (WCHA) (2002–present)
2002–03	Wisconsin	22–8–5	14–6–4	3rd	
2003–04	Wisconsin	25–6–3	18–5–1	2nd	
2004–05	Wisconsin	28–9–1	20–7–1	3rd	NCAA Quarterfinals
2005–06	Wisconsin	36–4–1	24–3–1	1st	NCAA Champion
2006–07	Wisconsin	36–1–4	23–1–4	1st	NCAA Champion
2007–08	Wisconsin	29–9–3	20–5–3	3rd	NCAA Runner-up
2008–09	Wisconsin	34–2–5	21–2–5	2nd	NCAA Champion
2010–11	Wisconsin	37–2–2	24–2–2	1st	NCAA Champion
2011–12	Wisconsin	33–5–2	23–3–2	1st	NCAA Runner-up
2012–13	Wisconsin	23–10–2	17–9–2	3rd	
2013–14	Wisconsin	28–8–2	21–5–2	2nd	NCAA Frozen Four
2014–15	Wisconsin	29–7–4	19–6–3	2nd	NCAA Frozen Four
2015–16	Wisconsin	35–4–1	24–3–1	1st	NCAA Frozen Four
2016–17	Wisconsin	33–3–4	22–2–4	1st	NCAA Runner-up
2017–18	Wisconsin	31–5–2	20–2–2	1st	NCAA Frozen Four
2018–19	Wisconsin	35–4–2	18–4–2	2nd	NCAA Champion
2019–20	Wisconsin	28–5–3	17–4–3	1st	Cancelled due to pandemic
2020–21	Wisconsin	17–3–1	12–3–1	1st	NCAA Champion
2021–22	Wisconsin	26–8–4	18–6–3	3rd	NCAA Quarterfinals
2022–23	Wisconsin	29–10–2	19–7–2	3rd	NCAA Champion
2023–24	Wisconsin	35–6–0	23–5–0	2nd	NCAA Runner-up
2024–25	Wisconsin	38–1–2	25–1–2	1st	NCAA Champion
2025–26	Wisconsin	35–4–2	24–3–2	1st	NCAA Champion
Wisconsin:		702–124–57	466–94–52		
Total:		702–124–57			
National champion Postseason invitational champion Conference regular season champion Conference regular season and conference tournament champion Division regular season champion Division regular season and conference tournament champion Conference tournament champion

- Tracey DeKeyser served as interim head coach for the 2009–10 season, while Johnson coached the US Olympic Women's Ice Hockey Team to a silver medal at the XXI Winter Games.

== See also ==
- List of family relations in the NHL
- List of college women's ice hockey career coaching wins leaders

Awards and achievements
Preceded by Dave Delich	WCHA Freshman of the Year; 1976–77	Succeeded by Greg Whyte
Preceded by Mike Eaves	WCHA Most Valuable Player; 1978–79	Succeeded by Tim Harrer
Preceded by Mike Eaves	NCAA Ice Hockey Scoring Champion; 1978–79	Succeeded by Bill Joyce
Sporting positions
Preceded by Russ Anderson	Hartford Whalers captain 1983–85	Succeeded by Ron Francis
Preceded by Ben Smith	American women's hockey team head coach 2006–2010	Succeeded by Katey Stone
