= Eagle River Stadium =

- U.S. National Register of Historic Places
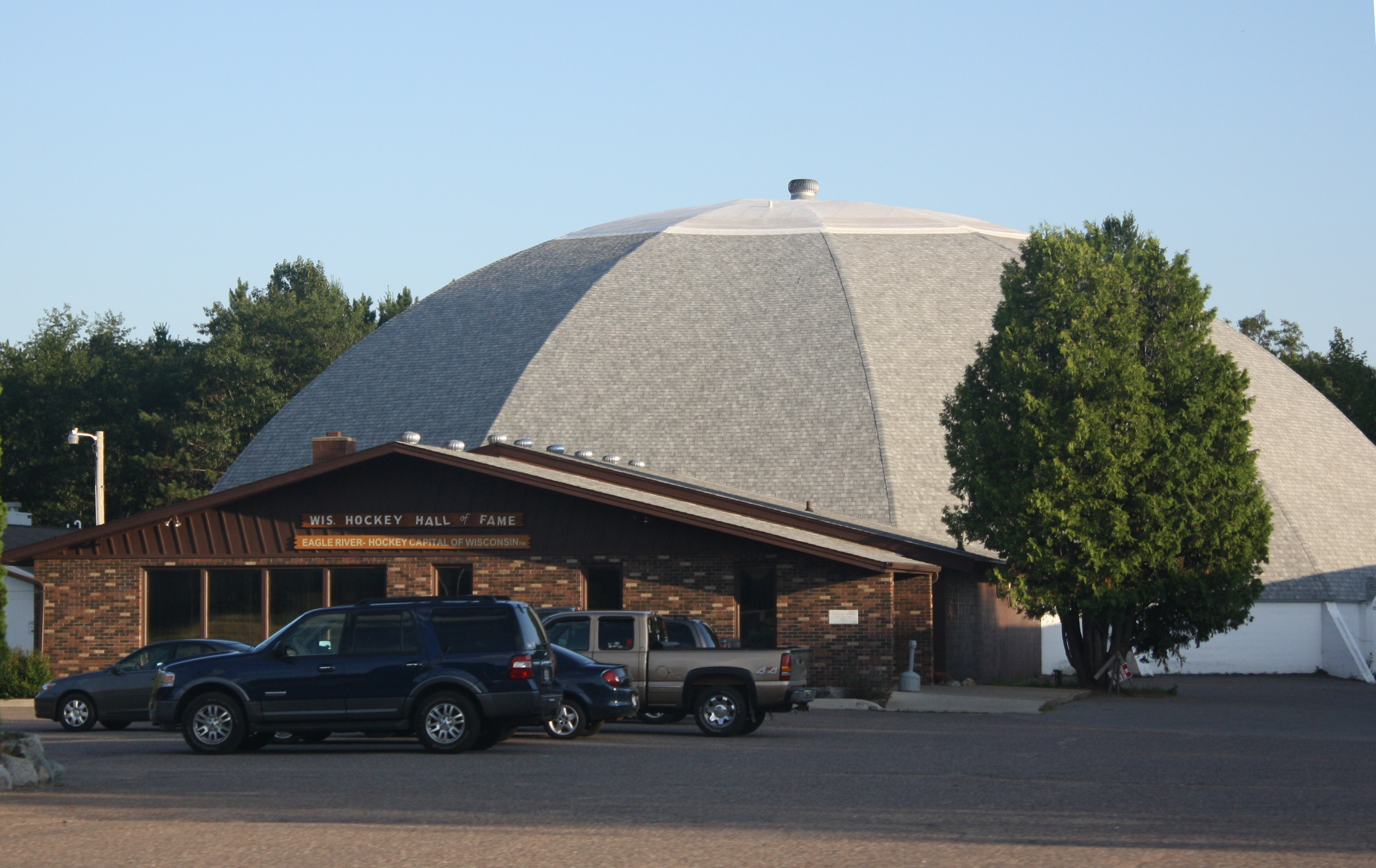
- The Wisconsin Hockey Hall of Fame at Eagle River Stadium

- Location within Wisconsin Location within the United States
- Location: 4149 Wisconsin Highway 70; Eagle River, Wisconsin
- Coordinates: 45°54′39″N 89°12′49″W
- Architect: Max Hanisch
- NRHP reference No.: 94000650
- Added to NRHP: June 24, 1994

The Eagle River Stadium is an ice rink and arena located in Eagle River, Wisconsin.

== History ==
The Eagle River Stadium, which seats roughly 2,000 people, was designed by German immigrant architect and engineer Max Hanisch, Sr. and constructed by local volunteers and community residents. Constructed mainly of wood in 1933, it is the first indoor hockey arena built in the state of Wisconsin. The roof framing is a wooden lamella design, using solid-sawn timbers interconnected in a unique honeycomb pattern. The facility is affectionately referred to as "The Dome" because of its dome-like shape. It has received major renovations once, in 1963–1964, when new locker rooms, indoor plumbing, and a concession stand were added.

The arena is home to the local high school hockey team, the Northland Pines Eagles; the ERRA Youth Hockey Association; a senior league team, the Eagle River Falcons; and formerly a tier II junior ice hockey team, the Wisconsin Windigo which changed ownership following the 2024-25 season and was moved to Brookfield Wisconsin; and the Wisconsin Hockey Hall of Fame.
