= 2009–10 Wisconsin Badgers women's ice hockey season =

Camp Randall Hockey Classic champions
- Conference: 4th WCHA
- Home ice: Kohl Center

Rankings
- USA Today/USA Hockey Magazine: —
- USCHO.com/CBS College Sports: —

Record
- Overall: 18-15-3
- Conference: 12-9-1
- Home: 10-8-2
- Road: 8-6-1
- Neutral: 0-1-0

Coaches and captains
- Head coach: Tracey DeKeyser (interim)
- Assistant coaches: Peter Johnson; Jackie Friesen
- Captain: Jasmine Giles

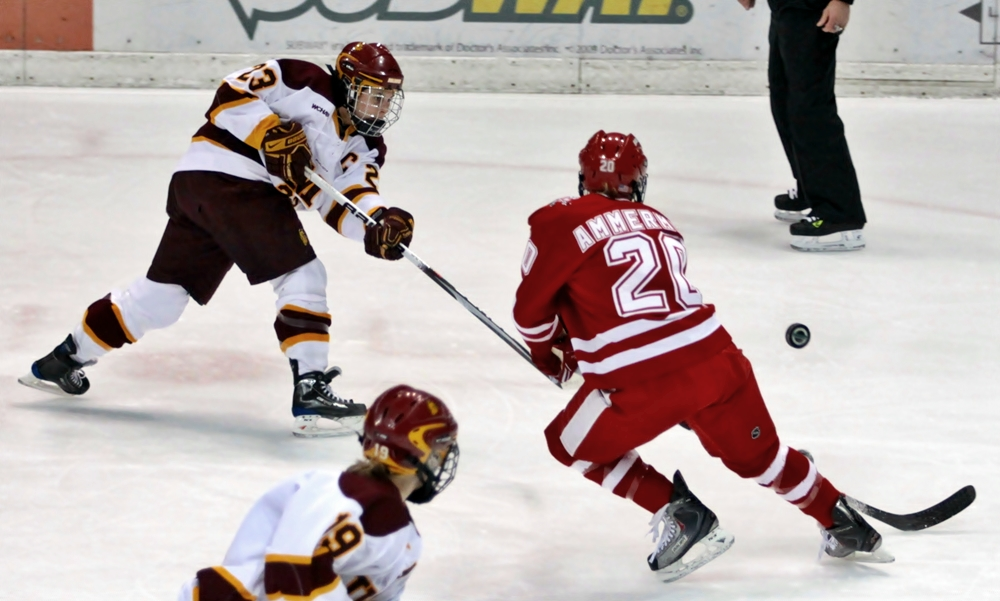
Wisconsin Badgers playing against Minnesota Duluth at the DECC arena in Duluth, MN on Sunday, January 17, 2010.

== Offseason ==
- July 31: The school hired two assistant coaches for the 2009–10 season. Tracey DeKeyser will act as the interim head coach while Peter Johnson and Jackie Friesen will fill in as short term assistants. Actual head coach Mark Johnson takes a one-year leave of absence to coach the U.S. women's team in the 2010 Winter Olympics in Vancouver.
- August 1: Former Wisconsin goaltender, Jessie Vetter has been named a finalist for the Women's Sports Foundation's Sportswoman of the Year award. Vetter is one of ten finalists selected for the 2009 honor which fans can vote for to determine the ultimate winner.
- August 15: Hockey Canada announced that Badgers players Mallory Deluce and Stefanie McKeough have been selected for Canada's National Women's Under-22 Team. The club will take part in a three-game series against Canada's National Women's Team from August 17–20 at Father David Bauer Olympic Arena in Calgary. Deluce was a member of Canada's National Women's Under-22 Team during the 2008–09 season. McKeough won a silver medal with Canada's National Women's Under-18 Team at the 2009 IIHF World Women's Under-18 Championship in Fussen, Germany.
- August 24: Two current and six former Badgers were selected to the 23-player roster for the U.S. Women's National Team. Five of the Badgers were part of the 2009 NCAA championship team, which includes Patty Kazmaier Award winner Jessie Vetter, Erika Lawler, Meghan Duggan, Hilary Knight and Angie Keseley. Former Badgers Kerry Weiland and Molly Engstrom were named to the squad. Engstrom is the only Badger with Olympic experience representing Team USA. Knight and Duggan will redshirt the 2009–10 season at Wisconsin to train with the U.S. National Team. Keseley is one of two players selected who has not played on a U.S. National Team prior to the selection.
- September 9: The WCHA announced that Wisconsin defenseman Brittany Haverstock and forwards Brooke Ammerman, Mallory Deluce and Jasmine Giles have been named as WCHA All-Stars. The three players are among 22 players from the conference to face the 2009-10 U.S Women's National Team in St. Paul, Minn. on September 25.
- September 24: The Badgers are the preseason pick to win the Western Collegiate Hockey Association women's title, according to a poll of league coaches. The Badgers collected six first-place votes and 48 points in a poll of the eight coaches.

== Regular season ==
- October 5: The Wisconsin Badgers women's hockey team was ranked No. 4 in the country. The USCHO.com officials revealed it in their first Top-10 Women's Hockey Poll of the season. Wisconsin accumulated 112 points and one first place vote.
- January 5: In an exhibition game against Wisconsin, former Wisconsin player Jinelle Zaugg-Siergiej netted a goal and had an assist as the American Olympic Hockey Team won by a score of 9–0.
- The Wisconsin women's played host to the Camp Randall Hockey Classic on February 6, 2010 at Camp Randall Stadium. The Wisconsin women's hockey program played the Bemidji State Beavers outdoors at the stadium as part of their weekend series, while the men's program followed by playing against the Michigan Wolverines in what will serve as the United States Hockey Hall of Fame Game. The No. 9 Wisconsin women's hockey team (16-10-3, 13-9-1 WCHA) defeated the Bemidji State Beavers (8-14-7, 7-9-7 WCHA), 6–1, in the first ever Culver's Camp Randall Hockey Classic at Camp Randall Stadium. The Badgers played in front of an NCAA-record crowd of 8,263 fans in the second-ever women's hockey outdoor showdown. Sophomore Carolyne Prevost scored the first goal in Camp Randall history at the 16:53 mark and backhanded it in to put the Badgers up 1–0. The Badgers dominated offensively, outshooting the Beavers 42–13. Freshman Becca Ruegsegger (Lakewood, Colo.) finished with 13 saves in net for Wisconsin,

=== Standings ===
2009–10 Western Collegiate Hockey Association standings
	Conference								Overall					
	GP	W	L	T	SOW	PTS	GF	GA	GP	W	L	T	GF	GA
Minnesota Duluth†*	28	20	6	2	1	43	90	55	41	31	8	2	138	83
Minnesota†	28	18	6	4	3	43	91	49	40	26	9	5	129	74
St. Cloud State	28	11	11	6	4	32	70	77	37	15	14	8	96	103
Wisconsin	28	15	12	1	0	31	84	63	36	18	15	3	107	82
Ohio State	28	12	13	3	1	28	90	94	37	17	15	5	122	117
Bemidji State	28	9	12	7	3	28	47	64	38	12	19	7	65	98
Minnesota State	28	5	18	5	3	18	49	92	34	7	22	5	66	117
North Dakota	28	7	19	2	0	16	44	71	34	8	22	4	61	92
Championship: † indicates conference regular season champion; * indicates conference tournament champion Updated July 21, 2024

=== Roster ===
- Brianna Decker was named WCHA Rookie of the Week after a two-goal game against North Dakota and a series against Ohio State. Against the Buckeyes, she recorded a five-point series and her first collegiate hat trick as the Badgers split with Ohio State from Jan. 29–30.
- Jasmine Giles recorded eight points in three games from Feb. 14-20 (five goals, three assists)
- Caroline Prevost recorded her first career hat trick against St. Cloud on Jan. 22 had a three-game assist and career-high three-game point streak from 10/11-24

Number	Player	Position	Class	Height
20	Brooke Ammerman	F	So	5-8
9	Mallory Deluce	F	Jr	5-7
26	Anne Dronen	D	Jr	5-3
7	Meghan Duggan	F	Jr	5-9
14	Maria Evans	F	Jr	5-4
12	Jasmine Giles	F	Sr	5-7
4	Brittany Haverstock	D	So	5-6
3	Olivia Jakiel	D	Jr	5-10
29	Nikki Kaasa	G	So	5-10
23	Hilary Knight	F	Jr	5-11
17	Emily Kranz	F	Sr	5-7
35	Alannah McCready	G	Sr	5-6
2	Kelly Nash	F	Jr	5-6
27	Carolyne Prévost	F	So	
11	Kyla Sanders	F	Sr	5-6
22	Malee Windmeier	D	Jr	5-9

=== Schedule ===
Date	Time	Opponent	Score	Record
10/2/2009	7:07 PM	vs North Dakota	Loss, 2-0	0-1-0
10/3/2009	7:07 PM	vs North Dakota	Win, 3-0	1-1-0
10/10/2009	7:00 PM	at Bemidji State	Loss, 1-0	1-2-0
10/11/2009	4:00 PM	at Bemidji State	Win, 3-1	2-2-0
10/23/2009	7:07 PM	vs Ohio State	Loss, 4-3	2-3-0
10/24/2009	7:07 PM	vs Ohio State	Win, 5-3	3-3-0
10/30/2009	2:07 PM	vs Minnesota	Win, 4-2	4-3-0
11/1/2009	2:00 PM	vs Minnesota	Win, 5-2	5-3-0
11/6/2009	2:00 AM	vs Robert Morris	Loss, 3-1	5-4-0
11/7/2009	2:07 PM	Robert Morris	Win, 3-2 (OT)	6-4-0
11/12/2009	7:07 PM	Wayne State	Tie, 2-2	6-4-1
11/13/2009	2:07 PM	Wayne State	Win, 6-2	7-4-1
11/20/2009	2:07 PM	at St. Cloud State	Win, 2-1	8-4-1
11/21/2009	2:07 PM	at St. Cloud State	Loss, 4-2	8-5-1
11/27/2009	7:00 PM	at Providence	Tie, 2-2	8-5-2
11/28/2009	7:00 PM	at Providence	Win, 4-1	9-5-2
12/4/2009	2:07 PM	vs Minnesota Duluth	Win, 3-1	10-5-2
12/6/2009	2:07 PM	vs Minnesota Duluth	Tie, 2-2	10-5-3
12/11/2009	7:07 PM	at Minnesota State	Win, 3-0	11-5-3
12/12/2009	3:07 PM	at Minnesota State	Win, 6-2	12-5-3
1/5/2010	7:07 PM	vs U.S. Select Team	Loss, 9-0	12-6-3
1/8/2010	7:07 PM	at North Dakota	Loss, 3-1	12-7-3
1/9/2010	7:37 PM	at North Dakota	Win, 2-0	13-7-3
1/16/2010	7:07 PM	at Minnesota Duluth	Loss, 5-3	13-8-3
1/17/2010	4:07 PM	at Minnesota Duluth	Loss, 2-1	13-9-3
1/22/2010	2:07 PM	vs St. Cloud State	Win, 5-3	14-9-3
1/23/2010	2:07 PM	vs St. Cloud State	Loss, 4-3	14-10-3
1/29/2010	6:00 PM	at Ohio State	Loss, 5-4	14-11-3
1/30/2010	3:00 PM	at Ohio State	Win, 3-2	15-11-3
2/6/2010	TBA	vs Bemidji State	Win, 6-1	16-11-3
2/7/2010	2:07 PM	vs Bemidji State	Loss, 2-0	16-12-3
2/12/2010	2:07 PM	vs Minnesota State	Loss, 5-3	16-13-3
2/14/2010	12:00 PM	vs Minnesota State	Win, 6-0	17-13-3
2/19/2010	6:07 PM	at Minnesota	Win, 4-3	18-13-3
2/20/2010	6:07 PM	at Minnesota	Loss, 3-2	18-14-3

== Home attendance ==
Wisconsin led all Division I women's ice hockey programs in both average and total attendance, averaging 2,227 spectators and totaling 44,537 spectators. This marked the fourth consecutive season in which the program led in these measurements of attendance.

8,263 spectators attended the February 6 Camp Randall Hockey Classic home game at Camp Randall Stadium against Bemidji State, setting a new (since surpassed) record for single-game attendance attendance in NCAA Division I women's ice hockey, surpassing the 6,889 crowd that had attended a game between New Hampshire and Northeastern during Frozen Fenway 2010 at Fenway Park in Boston the previous month.

== Player stats ==
= Indicates team leader

=== Skaters ===
Player	Games	Goals	Assists	Points	Points/game	PIM	GWG	PPG	SHG
Brooke Ammerman	35	20	18	38	1.0857	44	6	4	0
Mallory Deluce	32	13	19	32	1.0000	26	2	3	0
Brianna Decker	27	15	12	27	1.0000	20	3	4	1
Carolyne Prévost	32	11	15	26	0.8125	0	3	2	1
Jasmine Giles	36	12	13	25	0.6944	56	0	4	1
Kelly Nash	35	5	18	23	0.6571	40	1	3	0
Geena Prough	33	8	9	17	0.5152	4	0	2	0
Saige Pacholok	36	3	13	16	0.4444	38	0	1	0
Stefanie McKeough	36	1	14	15	0.4167	37	0	0	0
Kyla Sanders	34	5	6	11	0.3235	22	0	0	0
Breann Frykas	36	7	1	8	0.2222	20	1	0	0
Anne Dronen	36	1	6	7	0.1944	42	1	0	0
Brittany Haverstock	36	0	7	7	0.1944	28	0	0	0
Alev Kelter	22	1	5	6	0.2727	20	1	1	0
Emily Kranz	36	2	3	5	0.1389	4	0	0	0
Malee Windmeier	12	2	2	4	0.3333	14	0	0	1
Maria Evans	34	0	2	2	0.0588	0	0	0	0
Lauren Unser	27	1	0	1	0.0370	0	0	0	0
Olivia Jakiel	9	0	1	1	0.1111	0	0	0	0
Carla Pentimone	17	0	0	0	0.0000	0	0	0	0
Becca Ruegsegger	21	0	0	0	0.0000	0	0	0	0
Derya Kelter	20	0	0	0	0.0000	2	0	0	0
Alannah McCready	17	0	0	0	0.0000	0	0	0	0

=== Goaltenders ===
Player	Games	Wins	Losses	Ties	Goals against	Minutes	GAA	Shutouts	Saves	Save %
Alannah McCready	17	9	8	0	36	998	2.1647	2	375	.912
Becca Ruegsegger	21	9	7	3	45	1179	2.2899	2	439	.907

== Postseason ==
=== WCHA playoffs ===
Date	Time	Opponent	Score	Notes
02/26/2010	7:00 PM	vs Ohio State	1-3	Natalie Spooner gets a hat trick
02/27/2010	7:00 PM	vs Ohio State	3-4 (OT)	Ohio State sweeps series

== Awards and honors ==
- Brianna Decker, WCHA Rookie of the Week (Week of October 5)
- Brianna Decker, Badgers Rookie of the Year (2009–10)
- Carolyne Prevost, WCHA Offensive Player of the Week (Week of January 25)
- Becca Ruegsegger, WCHA Defensive Player of the Week (Week of November 2)
- Becca Ruegsegger, Wisconsin, WCHA Defensive Player of the Week (Week of January 11)
- Kyla Sanders, Frozen Four Skills Competition participant
- Jessie Vetter, Sportswoman of the Year by Women's Sports Foundation

=== Preseason honors ===
- WCHA Preseason Player of the year: Brooke Ammerman
- WCHA Preseason Rookie of the year: Brianna Decker
