= 2001–02 Wisconsin Badgers women's ice hockey season =

- Conference: 2nd (t) WCHA
- Home ice: Kohl Center

Rankings
- USA Today/USA Hockey Magazine: #7
- USCHO.com/CBS College Sports: #7

Record
- Overall: 22–11–2

Coaches and captains
- Head coach: Trina Bourget
- Assistant coaches: Tracey Cornell; Dan Koch; Forrest Kerr
- Captain: Sis Paulsen
- Alternate captain: Kerry Weiland

The 2001–02 Wisconsin Badgers women's ice hockey team was the Badgers' 3rd season. Head coach Trina Bourget was in her final season as Badgers head coach. The Badgers record in the WCHA was 17–6–1 with a second-place ranking.

== Regular season ==
=== Schedule ===
Date	Result	Opponent	Score
10/12	W	at St. Cloud State	5–1
10/13	W	at St. Cloud State	4–2
10/20	W	CONNECTICUT$	10–1
10/21	T	CONNECTICUT$	1–1
10/26	W	at Ohio State (10)	6–0
10/27	T	at Ohio State (10)	3–3
11/2	L	MINNESOTA DULUTH (1)	0–1
11/3	L	MINNESOTA DULUTH (1)	1–2 OT
11/9	W	MINNESOTA STATE	4–1
11/10	W	MINNESOTA STATE	3–0
11/16	L	at New Hampshire (5)	0–3
11/17	L	at New Hampshire (5)	0–2
11/23	L	vs. St. Lawrence (7)	0–1
11/24	T	vs. Toronto Jr. Aeros	1–1
11/30	L	MINNESOTA (4)	1–4
12/1	L	MINNESOTA (4)^	3–4 OT
12/8	W	BEMIDJI STATE	3–1
12/9	L	BEMIDJI STATE	1–5
1/6	W	at Minnesota Duluth (1)	3–1
1/7	W	at Minnesota Duluth (1	) 3–2
1/12	W	FINDLAY	5–1
1/13	W	FINDLAY	4–0
1/18	W	at Minnesota State	4–0
1/19	W	at Minnesota State	3–0
1/26	W	at Boston College	7–0
1/27	L	at Providence	1–2
2/2	W	ST. CLOUD STATE	4–1
2/3	W	ST. CLOUD STATE	7–2
2/16	W	at Minnesota (1)	2–0
2/17	L	at Minnesota (1)	2–3
2/22	W	OHIO STATE (10)	1–0
2/23	W	OHIO STATE (10)	3–0
3/1	W	at Bemidji State	6–2
3/2	W	at Bemidji State	4–1
3/7	W	vs. Minnesota Duluth (3)	4–1
3/9	L	vs. Minnesota (1)	2–3

== Awards and honors ==
- Meghan Hunter, AHCA All-American, Second Team
- Meghan Hunter, All-WCHA, First Team
- Kerry Weiland, AHCA All-American, First Team
- Kerry Weiland, All-WCHA, First Team
- Kerry Weiland, CoSIDA Academic All-District V

=== Team awards ===
- Kendra Anthony, Offensive Player of the Year award
- Kathy Devereaux, Badger Award
- Kathryn Greaves, W Club Community Service Award
- Carla MacLeod and Kerry Weiland, Defensive Player of the Year award
- Carla MacLeod, Rookie of the Year
- Sis Paulsen, Jeff Sauer Award
- Kerry Weiland, UW Athletic Board scholars
