= 2005–06 Wisconsin Badgers women's ice hockey season =

NCAA Division I National Champions WCHA Regular Season Champions WCHA Tournament Champions NCAA Championship Game, W 3–0 vs. Minnesota
- Conference: 1st WCHA
- Home ice: Kohl Center

Rankings
- USA Today/USA Hockey Magazine: #1
- USCHO.com/CBS College Sports: #2

Record
- Overall: 36–4–1
- Home: 17–2–0
- Road: 12–1–1
- Neutral: 7–1–0

Coaches and captains
- Head coach: Mark Johnson
- Assistant coaches: Tracey Cornell; Dan Koch; Jackie Friesen
- Captain: Sharon Cole
- Alternate captain(s): Sara Bauer; Nikki Burish

The 2005–06 Wisconsin Badgers women's ice hockey team was the Badgers' 6th season. Led by head coach Mark Johnson, the Badgers won their first NCAA championship.

== Regular season ==
=== Schedule ===
Date	Result	Opponent	Score
10/8	L	Minnesota Duluth	2–5
10/9	W	MINNESOTA DULUTH (4)	4–3 OT
10/15	W	VERMONT	5–0
10/16	W	VERMONT	5–0
10/21	W	at Minnesota State	4–1
10/28	W	NORTH DAKOTA	3–2
10/29	W	NORTH DAKOTA	8–0
11/4	W	ST. CLOUD STATE	5–2
11/5	W	ST. CLOUD STATE	3–1
11/9	W	vs Minnesota State	7–1
11/18	W	at Minnesota (4)	2–0
11/19	W	at Minnesota (4)	6–2
11/26	W	at Dartmouth	4–3
11/27	L	vs New Hampshire (4)	1–2
12/3	W	at Bemidji State	10–3
12/4	W	at Bemidji State	4–1
12/9	T	at Minnesota Duluth (1)	2–2 OT
12/10	W	at Minnesota Duluth (1)	2–1
1/6	W	at Wayne State	5–3
1/7	W	at Wayne State	3–0
1/13	W	at North Dakota	2–1 OT
1/14	W	at North Dakota	4–0
1/20	W	OHIO STATE	4–3 OT
1/22	W	OHIO STATE	5–1
1/28	W	BEMIDJI STATE	4–2
1/29	W	BEMIDJI STATE	3–1
2/3	W	at St. Cloud State	3–1
2/4	L	at St. Cloud State	0–1
2/10	L	MINNESOTA (5)	1–3
2/11	W	MINNESOTA (5)	3–1
2/17	W	MINNESOTA STATE	3–2
2/18	W	MINNESOTA STATE	5–0
2/24	W	at Ohio State	3–0
2/25	W	at Ohio State	1–0
3/3	W	NORTH DAKOTA	4–1
3/4	W	NORTH DAKOTA	6–0
3/11	W	vs. St. Cloud State	9–0
3/12	W	vs. Minnesota (4)	4–1
3/18	W	vs. Mercyhurst (7)	2–1 Double OT
3/24	W	vs. St. Lawrence (3)	1–0
3/26	W	vs Minnesota (4)	3–0

== Awards and honors ==
- Sara Bauer, Patty Kazmaier Award winner
- Sara Bauer, CoSIDA Academic All-District V
- Sara Bauer, ESPN The Magazine At-Large Academic All-American of the Year
- Sara Bauer, WCHA Player of the Year
- Mark Johnson, AHCA Division I Coach of the Year
- Mark Johnson, WCHA Coach of the Year
- Bobbi Jo Slusar, AHCA All-Americans First Team
- Bobbi Jo Slusar, Patty Kazmaier Award Top-10 Finalist
- Bobbi Jo Slusar, WCHA Defensive Player of the Year

=== All-WCHA honors ===
- Sara Bauer, First Team
- Sharon Cole, Second Team
- Meaghan Mikkelson, Second Team
- Bobbi Jo Slusar, First Team

=== Team honors ===
- Nicki Burish, W Club Community Service Award
- Sara Bauer, Offensive Player of the Year
- Sara Bauer, UW Athletic Board Scholars (letterwinners who have the highest cumulative grade point average in their respective sport)
- Sharon Cole, Badger Award
- Phoebe Monteleone Jeff Sauer Award
- Bobbi Jo Slusar, Defensive Player of the Year
- Jessie Vetter, Rookie of the Year
