= 2004–05 Wisconsin Badgers women's ice hockey season =

NCAA Quarterfinals, L 3–4 vs. Dartmouth
- Conference: 3rd WCHA
- Home ice: Kohl Center

Rankings
- USA Today/USA Hockey Magazine: #3
- USCHO.com/CBS College Sports: #6

Record
- Overall: 28–9–1

Coaches and captains
- Head coach: Mark Johnson
- Assistant coaches: Tracey Cornell; Dan Koch
- Captain: Carla MacLeod
- Alternate captain(s): Molly Engstrom; Jackie Friesen

The 2004–05 Wisconsin Badgers women's ice hockey team was the Badgers' 5th season. Their record in the WCHA was 20–7–1.

== Regular season ==
=== Schedule ===
| Date | Result | Opponent | Score |
| 10/8 | W | WAYNE STATE | 8–1 |
| 10/9 | W | WAYNE STATE | 11–0 |
| 10/16 | W | BEMIDJI STATE | 8–2 |
| 10/17 | W | BEMIDJI STATE | 4–0 |
| 10/22 | W | at Ohio State | 2–0 |
| 10/23 | L | at Ohio State | 1–3 |
| 10/29 | W | ST. CLOUD STATE | 7–0 |
| 10/30 | W | ST. CLOUD STATE | 7–1 |
| 11/5 | L | at Minnesota Duluth (4) | 3–4 |
| 11/6 | L | at Minnesota Duluth (4) | 1–2 |
| 11/20 | W | at North Dakota | 5–1 |
| 11/21 | W | at North Dakota | 7–2 |
| 11/26 | W | at Harvard (4) | 6–4 |
| 11/27 | W | vs Northeastern | 4–0 |
| 12/4 | L | MINNESOTA (1) | 0–2 |
| 12/5 | T | MINNESOTA (1) | 3–3 (OT) |
| 12/10 | W | at Minnesota State | 4–0 |
| 12/11 | W | at Minnesota State | 4–1 |
| 1/7 | W | at Quinnipiac | 7–0 |
| 1/8 | W | at Quinnipiac | 4–0 |
| 1/14 | W | MINNESOTA DULUTH (3) | 3–0 |
| 1/15 | L | MINNESOTA DULUTH (3) | 2–3 (OT) |
| 1/21 | W | NORTH DAKOTA | 8–0 |
| 1/22 | W | NORTH DAKOTA | 6–2 |
| 1/29 | L | at Minnesota (1) | 1–4 |
| 1/30 | L | at Minnesota (1) | 1–2 |
| 2/5 | W | MINNESOTA STATE | 3–0 |
| 2/6 | W | MINNESOTA STATE | 7–2 |
| 2/11 | W | OHIO STATE | 6–3 |
| 2/12 | W | OHIO STATE | 7–2 |
| 2/18 | W | at Bemidji State | 7–0 |
| 2/19 | W | at Bemidji State | 1–0 |
| 2/25 | W | at St. Cloud State | 5–2 |
| 2/26 | W | at St. Cloud State | 6–3 |
| 3/4 | W | vs. St. Cloud State | 3–1 |
| 3/5 | W | vs. Minnesota Duluth (2) | 3–2 OT |
| 3/6 | L | vs. Minnesota (1) | 2–3 OT |
| 3/19 | L | vs. Dartmouth (5) | 3–4 |

== Awards and honors ==
- Molly Engstrom, AHCA All-Americans (First Team)
- Molly Engstrom, Patty Kazmaier Award Top-10 Finalist
- Molly Engstrom, WCHA Defensive Player of the Year
- Carla MacLeod, AHCA All-Americans (Second Team)
- Carla MacLeod, Big Ten Medal of Honor
- Carla MacLeod, Patty Kazmaier Award Top-10 Finalist
- Carla MacLeod, 2004–05 USCHO.com Defensive Player of the Year

=== All-WCHA honors ===
- Sara Bauer, F, Second team
- Molly Engstrom, D, First Team
- Carla MacLeod, F, Second team
- Jinelle Zaugg, F, WCHA All–Rookie team

=== WCHA Player of the Week ===
- Sara Bauer, Week of Feb. 7, 2005
- Carla MacLeod, Week of Dec. 13, 2004
- Lindsay Macy, Week of Oct. 11, 2004
- Nicole Uliasz, Week of Nov. 22, 2004

=== Team awards ===
- Sara Bauer, Offensive Player of the Year Award
- Sharon Cole, Badger Award (Most Inspirational Player award)
- Molly Engstrom and Carla MacLeod, Defensive Player of the Year Award
- Carla MacLeod, W Club Community Service Award
- Phoebe Monteleone, Jeff Sauer Award (the player who consistently demonstrates dedication to her teammates)
- Emily Morris and Jinelle Zaugg, Rookie of the Year
