= Tracey DeKeyser =

Canadian ice hockey coach

Tracey DeKeyser (née Cornell) is a Canadian retired ice hockey player and a former coach with the Wisconsin Badgers women's ice hockey program.

== Biography ==
A native of Ashton, Ontario, DeKeyser and her husband, Darren, were married in 2008. She attended Cornell University, where she was a co-captain on the women's ice hockey team and a member of the Quill and Dagger society. In 1998, she played in Switzerland for SC Reinach Lions and helped them become Zurich Cup Tournament Champions. Later she also graduated from the University of Wisconsin-Madison in 2007. She resides in Middleton, Wisconsin.

== Coaching career ==
DeKeyser's first coaching experience was serving in the head coaching position of the girls' hockey team at Cushing Academy in Ashburnham, Massachusetts. She joined the Badgers in 1999. During the 2009–2010 season she was appointed as interim head coach while Mark Johnson took a leave of absence in order to coach the United States women's national ice hockey team in the 2010 Winter Olympics.

Statistics overview
Season	Team	Overall	Conference	Standing	Postseason
Wisconsin Badgers (WCHA) (2002–present)
2009–10	Wisconsin	18–15–3	12–9–1	3rd	
Wisconsin:		18–15–3	12–9–1		
Total:		18–15–3			

== Awards and honors ==
- Four-year letterwinner, Cornell
- Academic All-Ivy honoree
