= 2007–08 Wisconsin Badgers women's ice hockey season =

NCAA Division I National Runner-up NCAA Championship Game, L 0–4 vs. Minnesota–Duluth
- Conference: 3rd WCHA
- Home ice: Kohl Center

Rankings
- USA Today/USA Hockey Magazine: #2
- USCHO.com/CBS College Sports: #4

Record
- Overall: 29-9-3
- Home: 14-3-1
- Road: 12-6-2
- Neutral: 3-0-0

Coaches and captains
- Head coach: Mark Johnson
- Assistant coaches: Tracey Cornell; Dan Koch; Sara Bauer; Bobbi Jo Slusar; Phoebe Turner
- Captain: Emily Morris
- Alternate captain(s): Jessie Vetter; Jinelle Zaugg

The 2007–08 Wisconsin Badgers women's ice hockey team was the Badgers' 8th season. Led by head coach Mark Johnson, the Badgers went 20-5-3 in the WCHA.

== Regular season ==
=== Schedule ===
Date	Opponent	Result	Goal Scorers (Season Goals)	Goalie Saves	Attendance
Sept. 28	Union	W, 5-0	Matthews (1)-PP, Keseley (1), Kranz (1), Sanders (1)-PP, Deluce (1)	Vetter, 5	463
Sept. 29	Union	W, 11-0	Duggan (1), Keseley (2)-PP, Sanders (2), Sanders (3), Knight (1), Morris (1)-PP, Deluce (2), Knight (2)-PP, Duggan (2), Nash (1), Keseley (3)	McCready, 14	326
Oct. 5	ROBERT MORRIS	W, 3-0	Lawler (1), Zaugg (1)-PP, Deluce (3)	Vetter, 11	1,912
Oct. 6	ROBERT MORRIS	W, 3-1	Windmeier (1)-PP, Lawler (2), Keseley (4)	Vetter, 13	2,043
Oct. 13	OHIO STATE* (10/10)	W, 4-0	Deluce (4)-PP, Nash (2), Giles (1), Hagen (1)	Vetter, 12	1,434
Oct. 14	OHIO STATE* (10/10)	T, 2-2	Zaugg (2)-PP, Deluce (5)-GT	Vetter, 17	1,461
Oct. 19	St. Cloud State*	L, 2-1	Sanders (4) St. Cloud, Minn.	Vetter, 17	402
Oct. 20	St. Cloud State*	W, 5-0	Deluce (6)-PP, Zaugg (3), Deluce (7), Zaugg (4), Deluce (8)-PP-HT	Vetter, 12	287
Oct. 26	MINNESOTA STATE*	W, 4-2	Zaugg (5), Giles (2)-PP, Matthews (2), Knight (3)	Vetter, 12	2,137
Oct. 27	MINNESOTA STATE*	W, 4-2	Zaugg (6)-PP, Sanders (5), Knight (4), Jakiel (1)	Vetter, 16	1,538
Nov. 2	MINNESOTA* (6/7)	W, 3-0	Sanders (6), Sanders (7), Keseley (5)	Vetter, 22	1.389
Nov. 3	MINNESOTA* (6/7)	L, 3-2	Duggan (3)-PP, Lawler (3)-PP	Vetter, 15	2,404
Nov. 17	New Hampshire (2/3)	L, 2-1	Knight (5)-PP	Vetter, 24	1,196
Nov. 18	New Hampshire (2/3)	L, 2-1	Sanders (8)	Vetter, 20	1,226
Nov. 23	BemIdji State*	W, 7-0	Zaugg (7), Matthews (3)-PP, Knight (6)-PP, Zaugg (8)-PP, Lawler (4), Nash (3), Duggan (4)	Vetter, 13	121
Nov. 24	BemIdji State*	T, 0-0	None	McCready, 14	125
Nov. 30	MINNESOTA DULUTH* (3/3)	L, 3-1	Hanson (1) Kohl Center	Vetter, 19	1,342
Dec. 1	MINNESOTA DULUTH* (3/3)	L, 3-2 (OT)	Lawler (5)-PP, Duggan (5)-PP	Vetter, 22	1,638
Dec. 8	North Dakota*	W, 3-2	Knight (7), Giles (3), Lawler (6)	Vetter, 12	425
Dec. 9	North Dakota*	W, 4-0	Knight (8), Nash (4), Deluce (9), Lawler (7)	Vetter, 5	221
Jan. 4	MINNESOTA State*	W, 4-1	Kranz (2), Kranz (3), Sanders (9)-PP, Lawler (8)	Vetter, 17	304
Jan. 5	MINNESOTA State*	W, 3-1	Keseley (6), Lawler (9)-PP, Knight (9)	Vetter, 20	225
Jan. 18	OHIO State*	W, 3-2	Duggan (6), Zaugg (9), Duggan (7)-PP	Vetter, 25	231
Jan. 19	OHIO State*	W, 4-1	Zaugg (10)-PP, Knight (10), Keseley (7)-PP,	Vetter, 20	514 Duggan (7)
Jan. 25	ST. CLOUD STATE* (9/9)	W, 4-1	Sanders (10), Deluce (10), Zaugg (11), Nash (5)	Vetter, 22	1,494
Jan. 26	ST. CLOUD STATE* (9/9)	W, 4-0	Zaugg (12)-PP, Knight (11), Zaugg (13), Deluce (11)	Vetter, 18	5,377
Feb. 2	NORTH DAKOTA*	W, 6-1	Sanders (11), Knight (12)-PP, Knight (13)-PP,	Vetter, 16	2,219 Knight (14)-PP-HT, Sanders (12), Keseley (8)
Feb. 3	NORTH DAKOTA*	W, 5-2	Duggan (9)-PP, Duggan (10), Windmerier (2)-SH-EN	Vetter, 12	1,776 Duggan (11)-HT, Knight (15)
Feb. 8	MINNESOTA Duluth* (3/3)	W, 3-2	Sanders (13), Duggan (12), Hagen (2)	Vetter, 27	904
Feb. 9	MINNESOTA Duluth* (3/3)	L, 3-2	Duggan (13)-PP, Duggan (14)	Vetter, 27	891
Feb. 15	BEMIDJI STATE*	W, 4-0	Sanders (14), Keseley (9)-PP, Hagen (3), Zaugg (14)	Vetter, 11	1,318
Feb. 16	BEMIDJI STATE*	W, 3-0	Zaugg (15), Nordby (1), Duggan (15)	McCready, 12	790
Feb. 23	MINNESOTA* (4/4)	W, 5-1	Knight (16), Dronen (1), Zaugg (16), Duggan (16)-SH,	Vetter, 32	2,823 Duggan (17)
Feb. 24	MINNESOTA* (4/4)	T, 2-2	Matthews (4), Knight (17)-GT	Vetter, 22	2,130

== Home attendance ==
Wisconsin led all Division I women's ice hockey programs in both average and total attendance, averaging 1,861 spectators and totaling 33,502 spectators.

The 5,377 spectators at the January 26 home game against St. Cloud State set a new record for single-game attendance attendance in NCAA Division I women's ice hockey, surpassing the previous record of 5,167 spectators at the 2003 national championship game.

== Awards and honors ==
- Erika Lawler, Badger Award (known as Most Inspirational Player award)
- Jesse Vetter, WCHA Goaltending Champion (Lowest league goals-against

average)

=== All-WCHA ===
- Mallory Deluce, F, All-WCHA Rookie Team
- Meghan Duggan, F, First Team
- Hilary Knight, F, All-WCHA Rookie Team
- Erika Lawler, F, Second Team
- Jessie Vetter, G, First Team
- Jinelle Zaugg, F, Third Team

=== WCHA All-Tournament team ===
- Jinelle Zaugg, Forward

=== WCHA Player of the Week ===
- Alycia Matthews: Week of Oct. 29, 2007
- Jessie Vetter, Week of January 21, 2008
- Jessie Vetter, Week of January 28, 2008

=== WCHA Rookie of the Week ===
- Mallory Deluce, Week of Oct.15, 2007
- Mallory Deluce, Week of Oct. 22, 2007
- Mallory Deluce, Week of Feb. 18, 2008
- Hilary Knight, Week of Jan. 7, 2008
- Hilary Knight, Week of Feb. 4, 2008
