= Sis Paulsen =

American ice hockey and softball coach

Personal information
- Born: July 25, 1980 (age 45) Eau Claire, Wisconsin
- Height: 160 cm (5 ft 3 in)

Sport
- Sport: Ice Hockey
- Position: Defence
- University team: Wisconsin Badgers

Sis Paulsen (born July 25, 1980) is an American ice hockey and softball coach. She is the director of hockey operations and equipment manager for the Wisconsin Badgers women's ice hockey team and the equipment manager for the United States women's national ice hockey team.

== Playing career ==
Paulsen studied at the University of Wisconsin-Madison, where she played for the Wisconsin Badgers women's ice hockey team from 1999 to 2003. She served as team captain for three seasons. Over her four-year college career, she tallied 130 points, setting a school record for points by a defenseman. She graduated with a degree in human development and family studies.

== Coaching career ==
Following her playing career, Paulsen spent three seasons as an assistant coach for the Bemidji State Beavers women's ice hockey team, while also taking on the role of head coach for the Beavers softball team. She later served as an assistant coach for the Minnesota State Mavericks women's hockey team before earning her first head coaching role with New England College, where she led the program from 2009 to 2013. During the 2016–2017 season, she worked as an assistant coach for the New York Riveters. In addition, she served as the director of girls' hockey for the New Jersey Colonials in Morristown, New Jersey. Currently, she holds the position of director of hockey operations and equipment manager for the Wisconsin Badgers women's ice hockey team. She also served as the equipment manager for the United States women's national ice hockey team during the 2022 Winter Olympics in Beijing.
