= List of 2006 Winter Olympics medal winners =

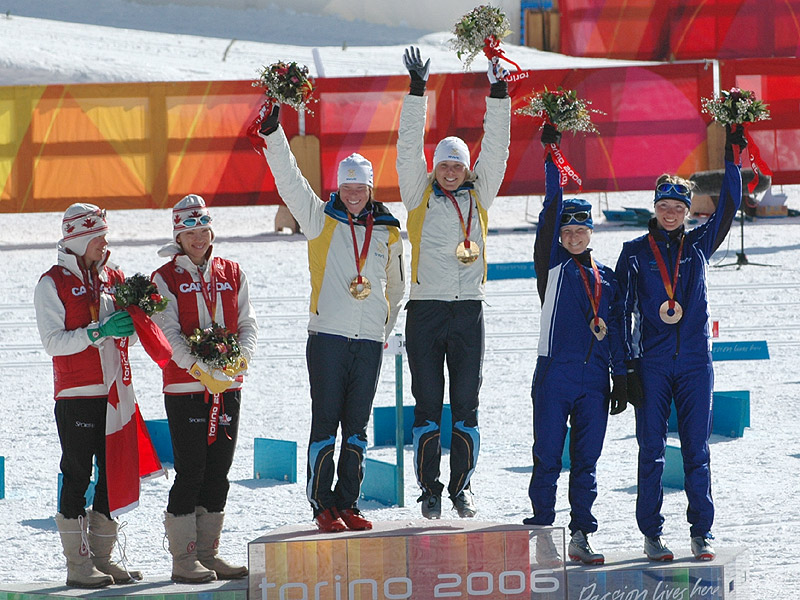
The medal ceremony for the women's team sprint in cross-country skiing. Left to right: Sara Renner and Beckie Scott (silver); Lina Andersson and Anna Dahlberg (gold); and Aino-Kaisa Saarinen and Virpi Kuitunen (bronze).

The 2006 Winter Olympics were held in Turin, Italy, from 10 to 26 February 2006. Approximately 2,508 athletes from 80 National Olympic Committees (NOCs) participated in these Games. Overall, 84 events in 15 disciplines were contested; 45 events were opened to men, 37 to women and 2 were mixed pairs events. Two disciplines were open only to men: Nordic combined and ski jumping, while figure skating was the only one in which men and women competed together in teams. Eight new events were introduced: snowboard cross, team pursuit (speed skating), team sprint (cross-country skiing), and the mass-start race (biathlon). The team sprint events replaced the classical men's 30 kilometers (km) and women's 15 km cross-country distances, held at the previous Winter Games in 2002. In total, there were six more events than in the 2002 Winter Olympics in Salt Lake City, United States.

A total of 451 individual athletes won medals. Germany won the highest number of gold medals (11) and led in overall medals (29) for the third consecutive Games. Athletes from 26 NOCs won at least one medal; of these, 18 won at least one gold medal. Latvia (Mārtiņš Rubenis – luge, men's singles) and Slovakia (Radoslav Židek – snowboarding, men's snowboard cross) won the first medals in their Winter Olympic history. Korean short-track speed skater Ahn Hyun-Soo was the most successful athlete, winning three gold medals and a bronze medal. His compatriot Jin Sun-Yu and Germany's Michael Greis also won three gold medals in short-track speed skating and biathlon respectively. Canadian speed skater Cindy Klassen won five medals (one gold, two silver, two bronze) and became the eighth Winter Olympian to win five medals at one edition of the Games. German Claudia Pechstein won two medals and became the fourth Winter Olympian to win at least one medal at five editions of the Games. Canadian Duff Gibson won a gold medal in the men's skeleton and, at age 39, became the oldest athlete to win a gold medal in an individual event at the Winter Olympics.

Several records for career medals in a sport were tied or surpassed, including alpine skiing (Norwegian Kjetil André Aamodt won a gold medal to extend his career record to eight medals), biathlon (Germany's Uschi Disl won a bronze, further extending her lead in this sport with nine medals; Norwegian Ole Einar Bjørndalen's three medals raised his career medal tally to nine), freestyle skiing (Norwegian Kari Traa won a silver for a career total of three medals), Nordic combined (Austrian Felix Gottwald won three medals, and tied the record with a career total of six), short track speed skating (American Apolo Anton Ohno and Chinese athletes Yang Yang (A) and Li Jiajun have all won five medals in total), and speed skating (Claudia Pechstein won two medals to extend her career record to nine medals).

== Alpine skiing ==
Event	Gold	Silver	Bronze
Men's downhill	Antoine Dénériaz; France	Michael Walchhofer; Austria	Bruno Kernen; Switzerland
Men's slalom	Benjamin Raich; Austria	Reinfried Herbst; Austria	Rainer Schönfelder; Austria
Men's giant slalom	Benjamin Raich; Austria	Joël Chenal; France	Hermann Maier; Austria
Men's super-G	Kjetil André Aamodt; Norway	Hermann Maier; Austria	Ambrosi Hoffmann; Switzerland
Men's combined	Ted Ligety; United States	Ivica Kostelić; Croatia	Rainer Schönfelder; Austria
Women's downhill	Michaela Dorfmeister; Austria	Martina Schild; Switzerland	Anja Pärson; Sweden
Women's slalom	Anja Pärson; Sweden	Nicole Hosp; Austria	Marlies Schild; Austria
Women's giant slalom	Julia Mancuso; United States	Tanja Poutiainen; Finland	Anna Ottosson; Sweden
Women's super-G	Michaela Dorfmeister; Austria	Janica Kostelić; Croatia	Alexandra Meissnitzer; Austria
Women's combined	Janica Kostelić; Croatia	Marlies Schild; Austria	Anja Pärson; Sweden

== Biathlon ==
Event	Gold	Silver	Bronze
Men's individual	Michael Greis; Germany	Ole Einar Bjørndalen; Norway	Halvard Hanevold; Norway
Men's sprint	Sven Fischer; Germany	Halvard Hanevold; Norway	Frode Andresen; Norway
Men's pursuit	Vincent Defrasne; France	Ole Einar Bjørndalen; Norway	Sven Fischer; Germany
Men's mass start	Michael Greis; Germany	Tomasz Sikora; Poland	Ole Einar Bjørndalen; Norway
Men's 4 × 7.5 km relay	Germany; Ricco Groß; Michael Rösch; Sven Fischer; Michael Greis	Russia; Ivan Tcherezov; Sergei Tchepikov; Pavel Rostovtsev; Nikolay Kruglov, Jr.	France; Julien Robert; Vincent Defrasne; Ferréol Cannard; Raphaël Poirée
Women's individual	Svetlana Ishmouratova; Russia	Martina Glagow; Germany^{[A]}	Albina Akhatova; Russia^{[A]}
Women's sprint	Florence Baverel-Robert; France	Anna Carin Olofsson; Sweden	Lilia Efremova; Ukraine
Women's pursuit	Kati Wilhelm; Germany	Martina Glagow; Germany	Albina Akhatova; Russia
Women's mass start	Anna Carin Olofsson; Sweden	Kati Wilhelm; Germany	Uschi Disl; Germany
Women's 4 × 6 km relay	Russia; Anna Bogaliy-Titovets; Svetlana Ishmouratova; Olga Zaitseva; Albina Akhatova	Germany; Martina Glagow; Andrea Henkel; Katrin Apel; Kati Wilhelm	France; Delphyne Peretto; Florence Baverel-Robert; Sylvie Becaert; Sandrine Bailly

== Bobsleigh ==
Event	Gold	Silver	Bronze
Men's two-man	Germany; Kevin Kuske; André Lange	Canada; Pierre Lueders; Lascelles Brown	Switzerland; Martin Annen; Beat Hefti
Women's two-man	Germany; Sandra Kiriasis; Anja Schneiderheinze	United States; Shauna Rohbock; Valerie Fleming	Italy; Gerda Weissensteiner; Jennifer Isacco
Men's four-man	Germany; Kevin Kuske; René Hoppe; Martin Putze; André Lange	Russia; Alexey Voyevoda; Alexei Seliverstov; Filipp Yegorov; Alexandr Zubkov	Switzerland; Martin Annen; Cédric Grand; Thomas Lamparter; Beat Hefti

== Cross-country skiing ==
Event	Gold	Silver	Bronze
Men's sprint	Björn Lind; Sweden	Roddy Darragon; France	Thobias Fredriksson; Sweden
Men's 15 km	Andrus Veerpalu; Estonia	Lukáš Bauer; Czech Republic	Tobias Angerer; Germany
Men's 30 km pursuit	Yevgeny Dementyev; Russia	Frode Estil; Norway	Pietro Piller Cottrer; Italy
Men's 50 km	Giorgio Di Centa; Italy	Yevgeny Dementyev; Russia	Mikhail Botvinov; Austria
Men's team sprint	Sweden; Thobias Fredriksson; Björn Lind	Norway; Jens Arne Svartedal; Tor Arne Hetland	Russia; Ivan Alypov; Vasily Rochev
Men's 4 x 10 km relay	Italy; Fulvio Valbusa; Giorgio Di Centa; Pietro Piller Cottrer; Cristian Zorzi	Germany; Andreas Schlütter; Jens Filbrich; René Sommerfeldt; Tobias Angerer	Sweden; Mats Larsson; Johan Olsson; Anders Södergren; Mathias Fredriksson
Women's sprint	Chandra Crawford; Canada	Claudia Künzel; Germany	Alyona Sidko; Russia
Women's 10 km	Kristina Šmigun; Estonia	Marit Bjørgen; Norway	Hilde G. Pedersen; Norway
Women's 15 km pursuit	Kristina Šmigun; Estonia	Kateřina Neumannová; Czech Republic	Yevgeniya Medvedeva; Russia
Women's 30 km	Kateřina Neumannová; Czech Republic	Yuliya Chepalova; Russia	Justyna Kowalczyk; Poland
Women's team sprint	Sweden; Lina Andersson; Anna Dahlberg	Canada; Sara Renner; Beckie Scott	Finland; Aino-Kaisa Saarinen; Virpi Kuitunen
Women's 4 x 5 km relay	Russia; Natalia Baranova-Masolkina; Larisa Kurkina; Yuliya Chepalova; Yevgeniya Medvedeva	Germany; Stefanie Böhler; Viola Bauer; Evi Sachenbacher-Stehle; Claudia Künzel	Italy; Arianna Follis; Gabriella Paruzzi; Antonella Confortola; Sabina Valbusa

== Curling ==
Event	Gold	Silver	Bronze
Men's team	Canada; Brad Gushue; Mark Nichols; Russ Howard; Jamie Korab; Mike Adam	Finland; Markku Uusipaavalniemi; Wille Mäkelä; Kalle Kiiskinen; Teemu Salo; Jani Sullanmaa	United States; Pete Fenson; Shawn Rojeski; Joseph Polo; John Shuster; Scott Baird
Women's team	Sweden; Anette Norberg; Eva Lund; Cathrine Lindahl; Anna Svärd; Ulrika Bergman	Switzerland; Mirjam Ott; Binia Beeli; Valeria Spälty; Michèle Moser; Manuela Kormann	Canada; Shannon Kleibrink; Amy Nixon; Glenys Bakker; Christine Keshen; Sandra Jenkins

== Figure skating ==
Event	Gold	Silver	Bronze
Men's singles	Evgeni Plushenko; Russia	Stéphane Lambiel; Switzerland	Jeffrey Buttle; Canada
Women's singles	Shizuka Arakawa; Japan	Sasha Cohen; United States	Irina Slutskaya; Russia
Pairs	Russia; Tatiana Totmianina; Maxim Marinin	China; Zhang Dan; Zhang Hao	China; Shen Xue; Zhao Hongbo
Ice dancing	Russia; Tatiana Navka; Roman Kostomarov	United States; Tanith Belbin; Benjamin Agosto	Ukraine; Elena Grushina; Ruslan Goncharov

== Freestyle skiing ==
Event	Gold	Silver	Bronze
Men's moguls	Dale Begg-Smith; Australia	Mikko Ronkainen; Finland	Toby Dawson; United States
Women's moguls	Jennifer Heil; Canada	Kari Traa; Norway	Sandra Laoura; France
Men's aerials	Han Xiaopeng; China	Dmitri Dashinski; Belarus	Vladimir Lebedev; Russia
Women's aerials	Evelyne Leu; Switzerland	Li Nina; China	Alisa Camplin; Australia

== Ice hockey ==
Event	Gold	Silver	Bronze
Men's team	Sweden; Daniel Alfredsson; P. J. Axelsson; Christian Bäckman; Peter Forsberg; Mika Hannula; Niclas Hävelid; Tomas Holmström; Jörgen Jönsson; Kenny Jönsson; Niklas Kronwall; Nicklas Lidström; Stefan Liv; Henrik Lundqvist; Fredrik Modin; Mattias Öhlund; Samuel Påhlsson; Mikael Samuelsson; Daniel Sedin; Henrik Sedin; Mats Sundin; Ronnie Sundin; Mikael Tellqvist; Daniel Tjärnqvist; Henrik Zetterberg	Finland; Niklas Bäckström; Aki-Petteri Berg; Niklas Hagman; Jukka Hentunen; Jussi Jokinen; Olli Jokinen; Niko Kapanen; Mikko Koivu; Saku Koivu; Lasse Kukkonen; Antti Laaksonen; Jere Lehtinen; Toni Lydman; Antti-Jussi Niemi; Ville Nieminen; Antero Niittymäki; Fredrik Norrena; Petteri Nummelin; Teppo Numminen; Ville Peltonen; Jarkko Ruutu; Sami Salo; Teemu Selänne; Kimmo Timonen	Czech Republic; Jan Bulis; Petr Čajánek; Patrik Eliáš; Martin Erat; Dominik Hašek; Milan Hejduk; Aleš Hemský; Milan Hnilička; Jaromír Jágr; František Kaberle; Tomáš Kaberle; Aleš Kotalík; Filip Kuba; Pavel Kubina; Robert Lang; Marek Malík; Rostislav Olesz; Václav Prospal; Martin Ručinský; Dušan Salfický; Jaroslav Špaček; Martin Straka; Tomáš Vokoun; David Výborný; Marek Židlický
Women's team	Canada; Meghan Agosta; Gillian Apps; Jennifer Botterill; Cassie Campbell; Gillian Ferrari; Danielle Goyette; Jayna Hefford; Becky Kellar; Gina Kingsbury; Charline Labonté; Carla MacLeod; Caroline Ouellette; Cherie Piper; Cheryl Pounder; Colleen Sostorics; Kim St-Pierre; Vicky Sunohara; Sarah Vaillancourt; Katie Weatherston; Hayley Wickenheiser	Sweden; Cecilia Andersson; Gunilla Andersson; Jenni Asserholt; Ann-Louise Edstrand; Joa Elfsberg; Emma Eliasson; Erika Holst; Nanna Jansson; Ylva Lindberg; Jenny Lindqvist; Kristina Lundberg; Kim Martin; Frida Nevalainen; Emilie O'Konor; Maria Rooth; Danijela Rundqvist; Therese Sjölander; Katarina Timglas; Anna Vikman; Pernilla Winberg	United States; Caitlin Cahow; Julie Chu; Natalie Darwitz; Pam Dreyer; Tricia Dunn-Luoma; Molly Engstrom; Chanda Gunn; Jamie Hagerman; Kim Insalaco; Kathleen Kauth; Courtney Kennedy; Katie King; Kristin King; Sarah Parsons; Jenny Potter; Helen Resor; Angela Ruggiero; Kelly Stephens; Lyndsay Wall; Krissy Wendell

== Luge ==
Event	Gold	Silver	Bronze
Men's singles	Armin Zöggeler; Italy	Albert Demtschenko; Russia	Mārtiņš Rubenis; Latvia
Men's doubles	Austria; Andreas Linger; Wolfgang Linger	Germany; André Florschütz; Torsten Wustlich	Italy; Gerhard Plankensteiner; Oswald Haselrieder
Women's singles	Sylke Otto; Germany	Silke Kraushaar; Germany	Tatjana Hüfner; Germany

== Nordic combined ==
Event	Gold	Silver	Bronze
Men's sprint	Felix Gottwald; Austria	Magnus Moan; Norway	Georg Hettich; Germany
Men's individual Gundersen	Georg Hettich; Germany	Felix Gottwald; Austria	Magnus Moan; Norway
Men's team	Austria; Michael Gruber; Christoph Bieler; Felix Gottwald; Mario Stecher	Germany; Björn Kircheisen; Georg Hettich; Ronny Ackermann; Jens Gaiser	Finland; Antti Kuisma; Anssi Koivuranta; Jaakko Tallus; Hannu Manninen

== Short track speed skating ==
Event	Gold	Silver	Bronze
Men's 500 m	Apolo Anton Ohno; United States	François-Louis Tremblay; Canada	Ahn Hyun-Soo; South Korea
Men's 1000 m	Ahn Hyun-Soo; South Korea	Lee Ho-Suk; South Korea	Apolo Anton Ohno; United States
Men's 1500 m	Ahn Hyun-Soo; South Korea	Lee Ho-Suk; South Korea	Li Jiajun; China
Men's 5000 m relay	South Korea; Ahn Hyun-Soo; Lee Ho-Suk; Oh Se-Jong; Seo Ho-Jin; Song Suk-Woo	Canada; Éric Bédard; Jonathan Guilmette; Charles Hamelin; François-Louis Tremblay; Mathieu Turcotte	United States; Alex Izykowski; J. P. Kepka; Apolo Anton Ohno; Rusty Smith
Women's 500 m	Wang Meng; China	Evgenia Radanova; Bulgaria	Anouk Leblanc-Boucher; Canada
Women's 1000 m	Jin Sun-Yu; South Korea	Wang Meng; China	Yang Yang (A); China
Women's 1500 m	Jin Sun-Yu; South Korea	Choi Eun-Kyung; South Korea	Wang Meng; China
Women's 3000 m relay	South Korea; Byun Chun-Sa; Choi Eun-Kyung; Jeon Da-Hye; Jin Sun-Yu; Kang Yun-Mi	Canada; Alanna Kraus; Anouk Leblanc-Boucher; Amanda Overland; Kalyna Roberge; Tania Vicent	Italy; Arianna Fontana; Marta Capurso; Katia Zini; Mara Zini

== Skeleton ==
Event	Gold	Silver	Bronze
Men's	Duff Gibson; Canada	Jeff Pain; Canada	Gregor Stähli; Switzerland
Women's	Maya Pedersen-Bieri; Switzerland	Shelley Rudman; Great Britain	Mellisa Hollingsworth-Richards; Canada

== Ski jumping ==
Event	Gold	Silver	Bronze
Men's normal hill individual	Lars Bystøl; Norway	Matti Hautamäki; Finland	Roar Ljøkelsøy; Norway
Men's large hill individual	Thomas Morgenstern; Austria	Andreas Kofler; Austria	Lars Bystøl; Norway
Men's large hill team	Austria; Andreas Widhölzl; Andreas Kofler; Martin Koch; Thomas Morgenstern	Finland; Tami Kiuru; Janne Happonen; Janne Ahonen; Matti Hautamäki	Norway; Lars Bystøl; Bjørn Einar Romøren; Tommy Ingebrigtsen; Roar Ljøkelsøy

== Snowboarding ==
Event	Gold	Silver	Bronze
Men's Halfpipe	Shaun White; United States	Danny Kass; United States	Markku Koski; Finland
Men's parallel giant slalom	Philipp Schoch; Switzerland	Simon Schoch; Switzerland	Siegfried Grabner; Austria
Men's snowboard cross	Seth Wescott; United States	Radoslav Židek; Slovakia	Paul-Henri de Le Rue; France
Women's Halfpipe	Hannah Teter; United States	Gretchen Bleiler; United States	Kjersti Buaas; Norway
Women's parallel giant slalom	Daniela Meuli; Switzerland	Amelie Kober; Germany	Rosey Fletcher; United States
Women's snowboard cross	Tanja Frieden; Switzerland	Lindsey Jacobellis; United States	Dominique Maltais; Canada

== Speed skating ==
Event	Gold	Silver	Bronze
Men's 500 m	Joey Cheek; United States	Dmitry Dorofeyev; Russia	Lee Kang-Seok; South Korea
Men's 1000 m	Shani Davis; United States	Joey Cheek; United States	Erben Wennemars; Netherlands
Men's 1500 m	Enrico Fabris; Italy	Shani Davis; United States	Chad Hedrick; United States
Men's 5000 m	Chad Hedrick; United States	Sven Kramer; Netherlands	Enrico Fabris; Italy
Men's 10000 m	Bob de Jong; Netherlands	Chad Hedrick; United States	Carl Verheijen; Netherlands
Men's team pursuit	Italy; Matteo Anesi; Stefano Donagrandi; Enrico Fabris; Ippolito Sanfratello	Canada; Arne Dankers; Steven Elm; Denny Morrison; Jason Parker; Justin Warsylewicz	Netherlands; Sven Kramer; Rintje Ritsma; Mark Tuitert; Carl Verheijen; Erben Wennemars
Women's 500 m	Svetlana Zhurova; Russia	Wang Manli; China	Ren Hui; China
Women's 1000 m	Marianne Timmer; Netherlands	Cindy Klassen; Canada	Anni Friesinger; Germany
Women's 1500 m	Cindy Klassen; Canada	Kristina Groves; Canada	Ireen Wüst; Netherlands
Women's 3000 m	Ireen Wüst; Netherlands	Renate Groenewold; Netherlands	Cindy Klassen; Canada
Women's 5000 m	Clara Hughes; Canada	Claudia Pechstein; Germany	Cindy Klassen; Canada
Women's team pursuit	Germany; Daniela Anschütz-Thoms; Anni Friesinger; Lucille Opitz; Claudia Pechstein; Sabine Völker	Canada; Kristina Groves; Clara Hughes; Cindy Klassen; Christine Nesbitt; Shannon Rempel	Russia; Yekaterina Abramova; Varvara Barysheva; Galina Likhachova; Yekaterina Lobysheva; Svetlana Vysokova

== Medal winner changes ==
A. Russian biathlete Olga Pyleva was the only 2006 Winter Olympics medalist to be stripped of their medal. She won a silver medal in the 15 km race, but tested positive for carphedon and was thus stripped of her medal. Germany's Martina Glagow was given the silver medal and fellow Russian Albina Akhatova won the bronze.

== Statistics ==
=== Medal leaders ===
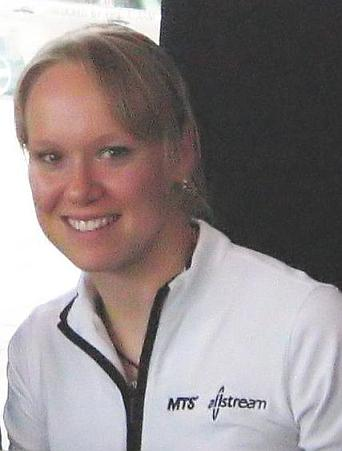
Canadian speed skater Cindy Klassen became the eighth Winter Olympian to win five medals at one edition of the Games.

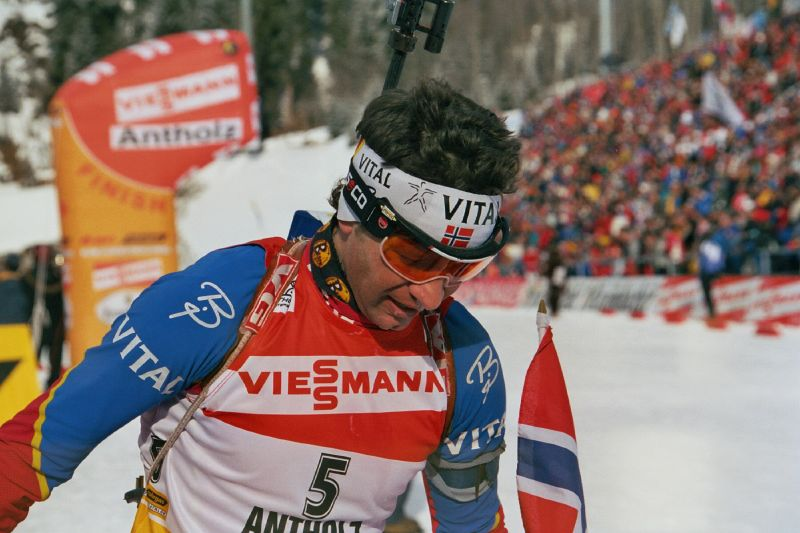
Norwegian Ole Einar Bjørndalen won three medals in 2006, tying the record for most career biathlon medals (9) set by Uschi Disl.

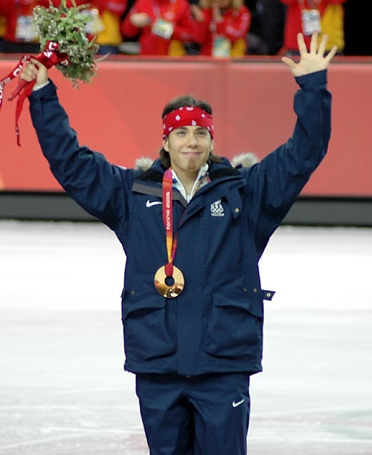
American Apolo Anton Ohno won three medals in Turin, becoming one of six short track speed skaters to win five career medals.

Athletes who won at least two gold medals or three total medals are listed below.

Athlete	Nation	Sport	Gold	Silver	Bronze	Total
Ahn Hyun-Soo	South Korea	Short track speed skating	3	0	1	4
Michael Greis	Germany	Biathlon	3	0	0	3
Jin Sun-Yu	South Korea	Short track speed skating	3	0	0	3
Felix Gottwald	Austria	Nordic combined	2	1	0	3
Enrico Fabris	Italy	Speed skating	2	0	1	3
Sven Fischer	Germany	Biathlon	2	0	1	3
Giorgio Di Centa	Italy	Cross-country skiing	2	0	0	2
Michaela Dorfmeister	Austria	Alpine skiing	2	0	0	2
Svetlana Ishmouratova	Russia	Biathlon	2	0	0	2
Kevin Kuske	Germany	Bobsleigh	2	0	0	2
André Lange	Germany	Bobsleigh	2	0	0	2
Björn Lind	Sweden	Cross-country skiing	2	0	0	2
Thomas Morgenstern	Austria	Ski jumping	2	0	0	2
Benjamin Raich	Austria	Alpine skiing	2	0	0	2
Kristina Šmigun	Estonia	Cross-country skiing	2	0	0	2
Cindy Klassen	Canada	Speed skating	1	2	2	5
Lee Ho-Suk	South Korea	Short track speed skating	1	2	0	3
Kati Wilhelm	Germany	Biathlon	1	2	0	3
Chad Hedrick	United States	Speed skating	1	1	1	3
Georg Hettich	Germany	Nordic combined	1	1	1	3
Wang Meng	China	Short track speed skating	1	1	1	3
Albina Akhatova	Russia	Biathlon	1	0	2	3
Lars Bystøl	Norway	Ski jumping	1	0	2	3
Apolo Anton Ohno	United States	Short track speed skating	1	0	2	3
Anja Pärson	Sweden	Alpine skiing	1	0	2	3
Martina Glagow	Germany	Biathlon	0	3	0	3
Ole Einar Bjørndalen	Norway	Biathlon	0	2	1	3

== See also ==
- 2006 Winter Olympics medal table
- List of 2006 Winter Paralympics medal winners
