= Sweden at the 2006 Winter Olympics =

- IOC code: SWE
- NOC: Swedish Olympic Committee
- Website: www.sok.se (in Swedish and English)

in Turin
- Competitors: 106 (63 men, 43 women) in 9 sports
- Flag bearers: Anja Pärson (opening); Anette Norberg (closing)
- Medals Ranked 6th: Gold 7 Silver 2 Bronze 5 Total 14

Winter Olympics appearances (overview)
- 1924; 1928; 1932; 1936; 1948; 1952; 1956; 1960; 1964; 1968; 1972; 1976; 1980; 1984; 1988; 1992; 1994; 1998; 2002; 2006; 2010; 2014; 2018; 2022; 2026

Sweden sent 112 athletes to the 2006 Winter Olympics in Turin trying to win their first gold medal since the 1994 Olympics in Lillehammer. A total of 99 athletes were selected, and they competed in nine of the fifteen Winter Olympic sports. When the medals were summed up, Sweden had managed seven gold medals, two silver and five bronze, making it Sweden's best result ever in the Winter Olympics in terms of both medals and gold medals earned, and gave Sweden a 6th place in the medal table.

Sweden won gold medals in five different Winter Olympic sports, shattering the previous record of two.

== Medalists ==
The following Swedish athletes won medals at the games:

| Medal | Name | Sport | Event | Date |
|---|---|---|---|---|
| Gold | Thobias Fredriksson; Björn Lind | Cross-country skiing | Men's team sprint | 14 February |
| Gold | Lina Andersson; Anna Dahlberg | Cross-country skiing | Women's team sprint | 14 February |
| Gold | Anja Pärson | Alpine skiing | Women's slalom | 22 February |
| Gold | Björn Lind | Cross-country skiing | Men's individual sprint | 22 February |
| Gold | Ulrika Bergman; Cathrine Lindahl; Eva Lund; Anette Norberg; Anna Svärd | Curling | Women's tournament | 23 February |
| Gold | Anna Carin Olofsson | Biathlon | Women's mass start | 25 February |
| Gold | Sweden men's national ice hockey team: Daniel Alfredsson; P. J. Axelsson; Christian Bäckman; Peter Forsberg; Mika Hannula; Niclas Hävelid; Tomas Holmström; Jörgen Jönsson; Kenny Jönsson; Niklas Kronwall; Nicklas Lidström; Stefan Liv; Henrik Lundqvist; Fredrik Modin; Mattias Öhlund; Samuel Påhlsson; Mikael Samuelsson; Daniel Sedin; Henrik Sedin; Mats Sundin; Ronnie Sundin; Mikael Tellqvist; Daniel Tjärnqvist; Henrik Zetterberg | Ice hockey | Men's tournament | 26 February |
| Silver | Anna Carin Olofsson | Biathlon | Women's sprint | 16 February |
| Silver | Sweden women's national ice hockey team: Cecilia Andersson; Gunilla Andersson; Jenni Asserholt; Ann-Louise Edstrand; Joa Elfsberg; Emma Eliasson; Erika Holst; Nanna Jansson; Jenny Lindqvist; Kristina Lundberg; Kim Martin; Frida Nevalainen; Emilie O'Konor; Maria Rooth; Danijela Rundqvist; Therese Sjölander; Katarina Timglas; Anna Vikman; Pernilla Winberg | Ice hockey | Women's tournament | 20 February |
| Bronze | Anja Pärson | Alpine skiing | Women's downhill | 15 February |
| Bronze | Anja Pärson | Alpine skiing | Women's combined | 18 February |
| Bronze | Mathias Fredriksson; Mats Larsson; Johan Olsson; Anders Södergren | Cross-country skiing | Men's 4 × 10 km relay | 19 February |
| Bronze | Thobias Fredriksson | Cross-country skiing | Men's individual sprint | 22 February |
| Bronze | Anna Ottosson | Alpine skiing | Women's giant slalom | 24 February |

== Alpine skiing ==
2004 and 2005 World Cup overall champion Anja Pärson won bronze medals in the women's combined and downhill, before claiming her first Olympic gold medal in the slalom. Anna Ottosson also earned a medal, winning the second run in the women's giant slalom to claim bronze.

Men

| Athlete | Event | Final | | | | |
| Athlete | Event | Run 1 | Run 2 | Run 3 | Total | Rank |
|---|---|---|---|---|---|---|
| Johan Brolenius | Slalom | 54.37 | 50.44 | n/a | 1:44.81 | 8 |
| Johan Brolenius | Combined | 1:43.56 | 45.20 | 44.51 | 3:13.27 | 18 |
| Martin Hansson | Slalom | 54.50 | 50.74 | n/a | 1:45.24 | 10 |
| Patrik Järbyn | Downhill | n/a | | | 1:52.87 | 33 |
| Patrik Järbyn | Super-G | n/a | | | 1:32.21 | 24 |
| Markus Larsson | Slalom | did not finish | | | | |
| Markus Larsson | Combined | 1:41.22 | 46.38 | 44.74 | 3:12.34 | 11 |
| André Myhrer | Slalom | 53.95 | 50.23 | n/a | 1:44.18 | 4 |
| Fredrik Nyberg | Giant slalom | 1:16.83 | 1:19.22 | n/a | 2:36.05 | 5 |

Women

| Athlete | Event | Final | | | | |
| Athlete | Event | Run 1 | Run 2 | Run 3 | Total | Rank |
|---|---|---|---|---|---|---|
| Nike Bent | Downhill | n/a | | | 1:59.17 | 22 |
| Nike Bent | Super-G | n/a | | | 1:34.41 | 21 |
| Nike Bent | Combined | 40.66 | 45.83 | 1:30.13 | 2:56.62 | 14 |
| Therese Borssén | Slalom | 43.21 | 47.87 | n/a | 1:31.08 | 8 |
| Janette Hargin | Downhill | n/a | | | 1:58.53 | 17 |
| Janette Hargin | Super-G | n/a | | | 1:34.48 | 22 |
| Janette Hargin | Combined | 40.06 | 44.78 | 1:31.29 | 2:56.13 | 12 |
| Jessica Lindell-Vikarby | Downhill | n/a | | | 1:58.56 | 18 |
| Jessica Lindell-Vikarby | Super-G | n/a | | | 1:34.78 | 24 |
| Jessica Lindell-Vikarby | Giant slalom | 1:02.12 | 1:11.24 | n/a | 2:13.36 | 18 |
| Jessica Lindell-Vikarby | Combined | 40.04 | 44.96 | 1:30.19 | 2:55.19 | 8 |
| Anna Ottosson | Giant slalom | 1:02.04 | 1:08.29 | n/a | 2:10.33 | Bronze medal |
| Anna Ottosson | Slalom | 44.09 | 47.99 | n/a | 1:32.08 | 18 |
| Anja Pärson | Downhill | n/a | | | 1:57.13 | Bronze medal |
| Anja Pärson | Super-G | n/a | | | 1:33.88 | 12 |
| Anja Pärson | Giant slalom | 1:01.07 | 1:09.89 | n/a | 2:10.96 | 6 |
| Anja Pärson | Slalom | 42.38 | 46.66 | n/a | 1:29.04 | Gold medal |
| Anja Pärson | Combined | 38.75 | 43.31 | 1:29.57 | 2:51.63 | Bronze medal |
| Maria Pietilä-Holmner | Giant slalom | 1:02.00 | 1:09.69 | n/a | 2:11.69 | 10 |
| Maria Pietilä-Holmner | Slalom | 44.16 | 48.31 | n/a | 1:32.47 | 21 |

Note: In the men's combined, run 1 is the downhill, and runs 2 and 3 are the slalom. In the women's combined, run 1 and 2 are the slalom, and run 3 the downhill.

== Biathlon ==
Anna Carin Olofsson, who had switched from cross-country skiing to biathlon just four years earlier, became the first Swedish woman to win a gold medal in biathlon. Olofsson also won a silver in the sprint event. The men's relay team fell short of a medal in a photo finish, having greatly hurt their chances by missing 12 shots.

| Athlete | Event | Final | | |
| Athlete | Event | Time | Misses | Rank |
|---|---|---|---|---|
| Carl Johan Bergman | Men's sprint | 29:21.5 | 0 | 54 |
| Carl Johan Bergman | Men's pursuit | did not start | | |
| Carl Johan Bergman | Men's mass start | 50:54.4 | 4 | 29 |
| Carl Johan Bergman | Men's individual | 57:30.9 | 3 | 23 |
| David Ekholm | Men's sprint | 28:33.2 | 2 | 38 |
| David Ekholm | Men's pursuit | 39:43.86 | 5 | 38 |
| David Ekholm | Men's individual | 59:18.2 | 2 | 35 |
| Björn Ferry | Men's sprint | 27:31.1 | 2 | 13 |
| Björn Ferry | Men's pursuit | 38:25.52 | 6 | 25 |
| Björn Ferry | Men's mass start | 48:56.4 | 2 | 18 |
| Björn Ferry | Men's individual | 58:49.0 | 4 | 28 |
| Mattias Nilsson | Men's sprint | 27:18.5 | 0 | 7 |
| Mattias Nilsson | Men's pursuit | 37:47.45 | 3 | 20 |
| Mattias Nilsson | Men's mass start | 48:37.7 | 1 | 14 |
| Mattias Nilsson | Men's individual | 1:00:01.1 | 5 | 44 |
| Anna Carin Olofsson | Women's sprint | 22:33.8 | 1 | Silver medal |
| Anna Carin Olofsson | Women's pursuit | 40:06.19 | 8 | 14 |
| Anna Carin Olofsson | Women's mass start | 40:36.5 | 1 | Gold medal |
| Anna Carin Olofsson | Women's individual | 52:55.8 | 5 | 15 |
| Jakob Börjesson; Björn Ferry; Mattias Nilsson; Carl Johan Bergman | Men's relay | 1:22:35.1 | 12 | 4 |

== Cross-country skiing ==
A total of fifteen athletes – ten men and five women – were selected, making the cross-country squad the largest excluding the ice hockey teams.

Emelie Öhrstig was the defending World Champion at the women's sprint event, but that was in classical style, and she failed to make the final in Turin. Björn Lind, leader of the men's cross-country World Cup in sprint, was more successful, winning the gold medal and then pairing with bronze medalist Thobias Fredriksson to win the team sprint event as well.

The women's sprint team of Lina Andersson and Anna Dahlberg joined their male counterparts in winning gold, while the men's 4 × 10 km relay claimed the only Swedish medal from a distance event, a bronze.

Distance

Men

| Athlete | Event | Final | |
| Athlete | Event | Total | Rank |
|---|---|---|---|
| Jörgen Brink | 30 km pursuit | 1:19:35.3 | 30 |
| Jörgen Brink | 50 km freestyle | 2:11:19.2 | 51 |
| Mathias Fredriksson | 15 km classical | 39:19.1 | 13 |
| Mathias Fredriksson | 30 km pursuit | 1:17:23.1 | 15 |
| Mathias Fredriksson | 50 km freestyle | 2:06:17.1 | 10 |
| Mats Larsson | 15 km classical | 39:51.7 | 19 |
| Johan Olsson | 15 km classical | 38:38.8 | 6 |
| Johan Olsson | 30 km pursuit | 1:18:47.9 | 23 |
| Johan Olsson | 50 km freestyle | 2:07:00.9 | 25 |
| Anders Södergren | 15 km classical | 39:17.1 | 10 |
| Anders Södergren | 30 km pursuit | 1:17:04.3 | 5 |
| Anders Södergren | 50 km freestyle | 2:06:14.1 | 6 |
| Mats Larsson; Johan Olsson; Anders Södergren; Mathias Fredriksson | 4 x 10 km relay | 1:44:01.7 | Bronze medal |

Women

| Athlete | Event | Final | |
| Athlete | Event | Total | Rank |
|---|---|---|---|
| Lina Andersson | 10 km classical | 30:25.53 | 33 |
| Lina Andersson | 30 km freestyle | Did not finish | |
| Elin Ek | 10 km classical | 29:40.9 | 23 |
| Elin Ek | 15 km pursuit | 46:02.7 | 31 |
| Britta Norgren | 10 km classical | 29:07.1 | 11 |
| Britta Norgren | 15 km pursuit | 44:18.0 | 15 |
| Britta Norgren | 30 km freestyle | 1:28:21.9 | 28 |
| Emelie Öhrstig | 10 km classical | 31:31.6 | 47 |
| Anna-Carin Strömstedt | 15 km pursuit | 47:51.3 | 47 |
| Anna-Carin Strömstedt | 30 km freestyle | 1:28:29.4 | 30 |
| Anna Dahlberg; Elin Ek; Britta Norgren; Anna-Carin Strömstedt | 4 x 5 km relay | 55:00.3 | 4 |

Sprint

| Athlete | Event | Qualifying | | Quarterfinal | | Semifinal | | Final | |
| Athlete | Event | Total | Rank | Total | Rank | Total | Rank | Total | Rank |
|---|---|---|---|---|---|---|---|---|---|
| Lina Andersson | Women's sprint | 2:13.29 | 3 Q | 2:16.0 | 3 | Did not advance | | | 11 |
| Anna Dahlberg | Women's sprint | 2:15.91 | 12 Q | 2:14.3 | 1 Q | 2:18.9 | 5 | Did not advance | 10 |
| Thobias Fredriksson | Men's sprint | 2:18.90 | 19 Q | 2:23.2 | 2 Q | 2:25.9 | 1 Q | 2:27.8 | Bronze medal |
| Peter Larsson | Men's sprint | 2:16.62 | 9 Q | 2:23.3 | 3 | Did not advance | | | 13 |
| Björn Lind | Men's sprint | 2:13.53 | 1 Q | 2:21.5 | 1 Q | 2:19.6 | 1 Q | 2:26.5 | Gold medal |
| Britta Norgren | Women's sprint | 2:16.43 | 19 Q | 2:15.0 | 3 | Did not advance | | | 13 |
| Emelie Öhrstig | Women's sprint | 2:16.75 | 21 Q | 2:19.9 | 5 | Did not advance | | | 22 |
| Mikael Östberg | Men's sprint | 2:16.24 | 6 Q | 2:26.7 | 3 | Did not advance | | | 12 |
| Thobias Fredriksson; Björn Lind | Men's team sprint | n/a | | | | 17:34.0 | 1 Q | 17:02.9 | Gold medal |
| Lina Andersson; Anna Dahlberg | Women's team sprint | n/a | | | | 17:33.5 | 3 Q | 16:36.9 | Gold medal |

== Curling ==
Summary

| Team | Event | Group stage | | | | | | | | | | Tiebreaker | Semifinal | Final / BM | |
| Team | Event | Opposition Score | Opposition Score | Opposition Score | Opposition Score | Opposition Score | Opposition Score | Opposition Score | Opposition Score | Opposition Score | Rank | Opposition Score | Opposition Score | Opposition Score | Rank |
|---|---|---|---|---|---|---|---|---|---|---|---|---|---|---|---|
| Peja Lindholm; Tomas Nordin; Magnus Swartling; Peter Narup; Anders Kraupp | Men's tournament | NZL; W 6–3 | ITA; W 7–5 | CAN; W 8–7 | NOR; L 4–9 | USA; L 6–10 | FIN; L 4–11 | GBR; L 2–8 | GER; L 5–7 | SUI; L 3–8 | 9 | did not advance | | | 9 |
| Anette Norberg; Eva Lund; Cathrine Lindahl; Anna Svärd; Ulrika Bergman | Women's tournament | CAN; W 7–5 | NOR; L 3–10 | GBR; W 8–6 | ITA; W 8–4 | USA; W 5–4 | SUI; W 9–7 | DEN; W 10–5 | JPN; W 8–7 | RUS; L 4–6 | 1 Q | BYE | NOR; W 5–4 | SUI; W 7–6 | 1st place, gold medalist(s) |

In the men's event, three-time World champion Peja Lindholm had a strong start, opening the tournament 3–0, including a win over eventual gold-medalists Canada, but fell off as the week continued, losing six consecutive games to finish out of the medal round.

On the women's side, Anette Norberg, the 2005 World champion, and a six-time European champion, led her team to the top spot in the round robin. The Swedes then survived a close game with Norway in the semifinal, winning with a single point in the final end. In the gold medal game, Norberg's rink had a comfortable lead, but saw Switzerland storm back to tie and force an extra end. In that extra, Norberg converted a difficult double takeout to win the gold medal.

=== Men's ===
Team: Peja Lindholm (skip), Tomas Nordin, Magnus Swartling, Peter Narup, Anders Kraupp (alternate)

Round-robin
Draw 1

| Team | 1 | 2 | 3 | 4 | 5 | 6 | 7 | 8 | 9 | 10 | Final |
|---|---|---|---|---|---|---|---|---|---|---|---|
| New Zealand (Becker) | 0 | 0 | 0 | 1 | 0 | 1 | 0 | 1 | 0 | 0 | 3 |
| Sweden (Lindholm) 🔨 | 0 | 0 | 1 | 0 | 3 | 0 | 1 | 0 | 1 | 0 | 6 |

Draw 2

| Team | 1 | 2 | 3 | 4 | 5 | 6 | 7 | 8 | 9 | 10 | Final |
|---|---|---|---|---|---|---|---|---|---|---|---|
| Italy (Retornaz) | 0 | 0 | 1 | 0 | 0 | 1 | 0 | 2 | 0 | 1 | 5 |
| Sweden (Lindholm) 🔨 | 0 | 2 | 0 | 1 | 0 | 0 | 2 | 0 | 2 | 0 | 7 |

Draw 3

| Team | 1 | 2 | 3 | 4 | 5 | 6 | 7 | 8 | 9 | 10 | 11 | Final |
|---|---|---|---|---|---|---|---|---|---|---|---|---|
| Canada (Gushue) 🔨 | 1 | 0 | 1 | 0 | 1 | 0 | 1 | 0 | 3 | 0 | 0 | 7 |
| Sweden (Lindholm) | 0 | 2 | 0 | 1 | 0 | 1 | 0 | 1 | 0 | 2 | 1 | 8 |

Draw 4

| Team | 1 | 2 | 3 | 4 | 5 | 6 | 7 | 8 | 9 | 10 | Final |
|---|---|---|---|---|---|---|---|---|---|---|---|
| Sweden (Lindholm) | 1 | 0 | 1 | 1 | 0 | 1 | 0 | 0 | X | X | 4 |
| Norway (Trulsen) 🔨 | 0 | 4 | 0 | 0 | 2 | 0 | 2 | 1 | X | X | 9 |

Draw 6

| Team | 1 | 2 | 3 | 4 | 5 | 6 | 7 | 8 | 9 | 10 | Final |
|---|---|---|---|---|---|---|---|---|---|---|---|
| United States (Fenson) | 0 | 2 | 0 | 2 | 0 | 1 | 0 | 1 | 2 | 2 | 10 |
| Sweden (Lindholm) 🔨 | 2 | 0 | 2 | 0 | 1 | 0 | 1 | 0 | 0 | 0 | 6 |

Draw 7

| Team | 1 | 2 | 3 | 4 | 5 | 6 | 7 | 8 | 9 | 10 | Final |
|---|---|---|---|---|---|---|---|---|---|---|---|
| Sweden (Lindholm) | 0 | 2 | 0 | 2 | 0 | 0 | 0 | 0 | X | X | 4 |
| Finland (Uusipaavalniemi) | 3 | 0 | 2 | 0 | 0 | 1 | 3 | 2 | X | X | 11 |

Draw 8

| Team | 1 | 2 | 3 | 4 | 5 | 6 | 7 | 8 | 9 | 10 | Final |
|---|---|---|---|---|---|---|---|---|---|---|---|
| Sweden (Lindholm) | 0 | 0 | 2 | 0 | 0 | 0 | 0 | X | X | X | 2 |
| Great Britain (Murdoch) 🔨 | 2 | 2 | 0 | 3 | 0 | 0 | 1 | X | X | X | 8 |

Draw 10

| Team | 1 | 2 | 3 | 4 | 5 | 6 | 7 | 8 | 9 | 10 | Final |
|---|---|---|---|---|---|---|---|---|---|---|---|
| Germany (Kapp) | 0 | 0 | 0 | 1 | 0 | 4 | 1 | 0 | 0 | 1 | 7 |
| Sweden (Lindholm) 🔨 | 0 | 1 | 0 | 0 | 2 | 0 | 0 | 1 | 1 | 0 | 5 |

Draw 11

| Team | 1 | 2 | 3 | 4 | 5 | 6 | 7 | 8 | 9 | 10 | Final |
|---|---|---|---|---|---|---|---|---|---|---|---|
| Sweden (Lindholm) 🔨 | 0 | 0 | 2 | 0 | 0 | 1 | 0 | 0 | 0 | X | 3 |
| Switzerland (Stöckli) | 0 | 1 | 0 | 0 | 2 | 0 | 1 | 3 | 1 | X | 8 |

Standings

| Rank | Team | Skip | Won | Lost |
|---|---|---|---|---|
| 1 | Finland | Markku Uusipaavalniemi | 7 | 2 |
| 2 | Canada | Brad Gushue | 6 | 3 |
| 3 | United States | Pete Fenson | 6 | 3 |
| 4 | Great Britain | David Murdoch | 6 | 3 |
| 5 | Norway | Pål Trulsen | 5 | 4 |
| 6 | Switzerland | Ralph Stöckli | 5 | 4 |
| 7 | Italy | Joel Retornaz | 4 | 5 |
| 8 | Sweden | Peter Lindholm | 3 | 6 |
| 9 | Germany | Andy Kapp | 3 | 6 |
| 10 | New Zealand | Sean Becker | 0 | 9 |

=== Women's ===
: Anette Norberg (skip), Eva Lund, Cathrine Lindahl, Anna Svärd, Ulrika Bergman (alternate)

Round-robin
Draw 1

| Team | 1 | 2 | 3 | 4 | 5 | 6 | 7 | 8 | 9 | 10 | Final |
|---|---|---|---|---|---|---|---|---|---|---|---|
| Canada (Kleibrink) | 0 | 0 | 0 | 2 | 0 | 0 | 2 | 0 | 1 | 0 | 5 |
| Sweden (Norberg) 🔨 | 0 | 0 | 2 | 0 | 2 | 0 | 0 | 2 | 0 | 1 | 7 |

Draw 2

| Team | 1 | 2 | 3 | 4 | 5 | 6 | 7 | 8 | 9 | 10 | Final |
|---|---|---|---|---|---|---|---|---|---|---|---|
| Norway (Nordby) 🔨 | 0 | 0 | 0 | 2 | 1 | 1 | 0 | 0 | 2 | 4 | 10 |
| Sweden (Norberg) | 0 | 0 | 1 | 0 | 0 | 0 | 1 | 1 | 0 | 0 | 3 |

Draw 4

| Team | 1 | 2 | 3 | 4 | 5 | 6 | 7 | 8 | 9 | 10 | Final |
|---|---|---|---|---|---|---|---|---|---|---|---|
| Sweden (Norberg) 🔨 | 1 | 2 | 2 | 0 | 1 | 0 | 0 | 1 | 0 | 1 | 8 |
| Great Britain (Martin) | 0 | 0 | 0 | 2 | 0 | 2 | 0 | 0 | 2 | 0 | 6 |

Draw 5

| Team | 1 | 2 | 3 | 4 | 5 | 6 | 7 | 8 | 9 | 10 | Final |
|---|---|---|---|---|---|---|---|---|---|---|---|
| Sweden (Norberg) | 0 | 0 | 2 | 0 | 3 | 0 | 1 | 0 | 1 | 1 | 8 |
| Italy (Gaspari) 🔨 | 0 | 1 | 0 | 1 | 0 | 1 | 0 | 1 | 0 | 0 | 4 |

Draw 6

| Team | 1 | 2 | 3 | 4 | 5 | 6 | 7 | 8 | 9 | 10 | 11 | Final |
|---|---|---|---|---|---|---|---|---|---|---|---|---|
| Sweden (Norberg) 🔨 | 0 | 1 | 0 | 0 | 0 | 0 | 1 | 1 | 0 | 1 | 1 | 5 |
| United States (Johnson) | 0 | 0 | 1 | 0 | 1 | 0 | 0 | 0 | 2 | 0 | 0 | 4 |

Draw 7

| Team | 1 | 2 | 3 | 4 | 5 | 6 | 7 | 8 | 9 | 10 | Final |
|---|---|---|---|---|---|---|---|---|---|---|---|
| Switzerland (Ott) | 2 | 0 | 1 | 0 | 0 | 1 | 0 | 2 | 0 | 1 | 7 |
| Sweden (Norberg) 🔨 | 0 | 1 | 0 | 2 | 0 | 0 | 2 | 0 | 4 | 0 | 9 |

Draw 8

| Team | 1 | 2 | 3 | 4 | 5 | 6 | 7 | 8 | 9 | 10 | Final |
|---|---|---|---|---|---|---|---|---|---|---|---|
| Sweden (Norberg) | 0 | 2 | 0 | 0 | 2 | 2 | 4 | 0 | X | X | 10 |
| Denmark (Holm) 🔨 | 1 | 0 | 3 | 0 | 0 | 0 | 0 | 1 | X | X | 5 |

Draw 9

| Team | 1 | 2 | 3 | 4 | 5 | 6 | 7 | 8 | 9 | 10 | 11 | Final |
|---|---|---|---|---|---|---|---|---|---|---|---|---|
| Japan (Onodera) 🔨 | 1 | 2 | 0 | 0 | 2 | 0 | 0 | 1 | 0 | 1 | 0 | 7 |
| Sweden (Norberg) | 0 | 0 | 0 | 2 | 0 | 2 | 1 | 0 | 2 | 0 | 1 | 8 |

Draw 11

| Team | 1 | 2 | 3 | 4 | 5 | 6 | 7 | 8 | 9 | 10 | Final |
|---|---|---|---|---|---|---|---|---|---|---|---|
| Sweden (Norberg) 🔨 | 0 | 0 | 0 | 2 | 0 | 0 | 0 | 1 | 0 | 1 | 4 |
| Russia (Privivkova) | 0 | 1 | 0 | 0 | 1 | 1 | 1 | 0 | 2 | 0 | 6 |

Standings

| Rank | Team | Skip | Won | Lost |
|---|---|---|---|---|
| 1 | Sweden | Anette Norberg | 7 | 2 |
| 2 | Switzerland | Mirjam Ott | 7 | 2 |
| 3 | Canada | Shannon Kleibrink | 6 | 3 |
| 4 | Norway | Dordi Nordby | 6 | 3 |
| 5 | Great Britain | Rhona Martin | 5 | 4 |
| 6 | Russia | Ludmila Privivkova | 5 | 4 |
| 7 | Japan | Ayumi Onodera | 4 | 5 |
| 8 | Denmark | Dorthe Holm | 2 | 7 |
| 9 | United States | Cassandra Johnson | 2 | 7 |
| 10 | Italy | Diana Gaspari | 1 | 8 |

Playoffs
Semifinal

| Team | 1 | 2 | 3 | 4 | 5 | 6 | 7 | 8 | 9 | 10 | Final |
|---|---|---|---|---|---|---|---|---|---|---|---|
| Sweden (Norberg) | 0 | 0 | 1 | 0 | 1 | 0 | 1 | 1 | 0 | 1 | 5 |
| Norway (Nordby) 🔨 | 1 | 0 | 0 | 1 | 0 | 1 | 0 | 0 | 1 | 0 | 4 |

Final

| Team | 1 | 2 | 3 | 4 | 5 | 6 | 7 | 8 | 9 | 10 | 11 | Final |
|---|---|---|---|---|---|---|---|---|---|---|---|---|
| Sweden (Norberg) 🔨 | 0 | 2 | 0 | 1 | 0 | 1 | 1 | 0 | 1 | 0 | 1 | 7 |
| Switzerland (Ott) | 0 | 0 | 2 | 0 | 0 | 0 | 0 | 2 | 0 | 2 | 0 | 6 |

Key: The hammer indicates which team had the last stone in the first end.

== Figure skating ==
Kristoffer Berntsson, the lone Swedish figure skater in Turin, finished 23rd in the men's event.

| Athlete | Event | CD | | SP/OD | | FS/FD | | Total | |
| Athlete | Event | Points | Rank | Points | Rank | Points | Rank | Points | Rank |
|---|---|---|---|---|---|---|---|---|---|
| Kristoffer Berntsson | Men's | n/a | | 59.55 | 23 Q | 102.40 | 22 | 161.95 | 23 |

Key: CD = Compulsory Dance, FD = Free Dance, FS = Free Skate, OD = Original Dance, SP = Short Program

== Freestyle skiing ==
Four moguls skiers represented Sweden in the freestyle disciplines, with the best finish coming from Sara Kjellin in the women's event. Kjellin sat in bronze medal position with only a single skier to come, but that skier was eventual winner Jennifer Heil, leaving Kjellin just short of a medal.

| Athlete | Event | Qualifying | | Final | |
| Athlete | Event | Points | Rank | Points | Rank |
|---|---|---|---|---|---|
| Jesper Björnlund | Men's moguls | 23.97 | 8 Q | 25.21 | 5 |
| Fredrik Fortkord | Men's moguls | 22.87 | 17 Q | 20.58 | 19 |
| Sara Kjellin | Women's moguls | 24.85 | 3 Q | 24.74 | 4 |
| Per Spett | Men's moguls | 21.53 | 23 | did not advance | 23 |

== Ice hockey ==
Summary

Key:

- OT – Overtime
- GWS – Match decided by penalty-shootout

| Team | Event | Group stage | | | | | | Quarterfinal | Semifinal / Pl. | Final / BM / Pl. | |
| Team | Event | Opposition Score | Opposition Score | Opposition Score | Opposition Score | Opposition Score | Rank | Opposition Score | Opposition Score | Opposition Score | Rank |
|---|---|---|---|---|---|---|---|---|---|---|---|
| Sweden men's | Men's tournament | Kazakhstan; W 7–2 | Russia; L 0–5 | Latvia; W 6–1 | United States; W 2–1 | Slovakia; L 0–3 | 3 Q | Switzerland; W 6–2 | Czech Republic; W 7–3 | Finland; W 3–2 | 1st place, gold medalist(s) |
| Sweden women's | Women's tournament | Russia; W 3–1 | Italy; W 11–0 | Canada; L 1–8 | —N/a | | 2 Q | —N/a | United States; W 3–2 SO | Canada; L 1–4 | 2nd place, silver medalist(s) |

The Swedish men's team suffered an early setback when it lost 5–0 to Russia, but wins over Kazakhstan, Latvia and the United States meant that the team was guaranteed a quarterfinal spot entering the final round-robin game with Slovakia. This game stirred up controversy, with head coach Bengt-Åke Gustafsson suggesting that the team might not play for a win, in order to set up a quarterfinal matchup with underdog Switzerland. Ultimately, the Swedes did lose the game, though the IIHF supervisor "didn't see anything special". The team then picked up comfortable wins in the medal round, beating the Swiss 5–2 and the Czech Republic 7–3, setting up a gold medal final with local rivals Finland. The Swedes fell behind after the first period, but a pair of goals in the second left the game tied going into the final 20 minutes. Nicklas Lidström then scored early in the third, giving the Swedes a 3–2 lead that would hold, and giving the country its first Olympic hockey title since 1994. Thousands of fans greeted the victorious team upon their return from Turin, with many of the NHL players stopping in Stockholm before returning to their club teams.

The women's team managed to advance to the medal round in the Olympic tournament, but an 8–1 loss to Canada only seemed to enhance the perception that women's hockey had few competitive teams. In the semifinals, the Swedes faced the United States, and fell behind 2–0 early in the second period. However, the Swedes then rallied, scoring twice to tie the game, and shut down the favoured Americans, forcing a shootout to decide the game. Swedish goaltender Kim Martin stopped four American shooters, while Pernilla Winberg and Maria Rooth scored for Sweden. This was the first game in which any team other than Canada had beaten the United States, and made Sweden the first team outside the top two to advance to a major final. The final was not as close, with Canada pulling out to a 4–0 lead by the halfway mark. Still, earning silver medal was a significant accomplishment for the Swedish women.

=== Men's ===
Roster

The following is the Swedish roster for the men's ice hockey tournament at the 2006 Winter Olympics.

Head coach: Bengt-Åke Gustafsson

Assistant coaches: Anders Eldebrink, Janne Karlsson

| No. | Pos. | Name | Height | Weight | Birthdate | Birthplace | 2005–06 team |
|---|---|---|---|---|---|---|---|
| 1 | G | Stefan Liv | 184 cm (6 ft 0 in) | 84 kg (185 lb) | 21 December 1980 | Gdynia, Poland | (Sweden) HV71 |
| 35 | G | Henrik Lundqvist | 185 cm (6 ft 1 in) | 87 kg (192 lb) | 2 March 1982 | Åre | (United States) New York Rangers |
| 32 | G | Mikael Tellqvist | 182 cm (6 ft 0 in) | 84 kg (185 lb) | 19 September 1979 | Sundbyberg | (Canada) Toronto Maple Leafs |
| 8 | D | Christian Bäckman | 191 cm (6 ft 3 in) | 93 kg (205 lb) | 28 April 1980 | Alingsås | (United States) St. Louis Blues |
| 15 | D | Niclas Hävelid | 182 cm (6 ft 0 in) | 90 kg (200 lb) | 12 April 1973 | Stockholm | (United States) Atlanta Thrashers |
| 29 | D | Kenny Jönsson | 191 cm (6 ft 3 in) | 93 kg (205 lb) | 6 October 1974 | Ängelholm | (Sweden) Rögle BK |
| 7 | D | Niklas Kronwall | 183 cm (6 ft 0 in) | 86 kg (190 lb) | 12 January 1981 | Järfälla | (United States) Detroit Red Wings |
| 5 | D | Nicklas Lidström – A | 188 cm (6 ft 2 in) | 84 kg (185 lb) | 28 April 1970 | Avesta | (United States) Detroit Red Wings |
| 2 | D | Mattias Öhlund | 191 cm (6 ft 3 in) | 100 kg (220 lb) | 9 September 1976 | Piteå | (Canada) Vancouver Canucks |
| 23 | D | Ronnie Sundin | 186 cm (6 ft 1 in) | 98 kg (216 lb) | 3 October 1970 | Ludvika | (Sweden) Frölunda Indians |
| 34 | D | Daniel Tjärnqvist | 188 cm (6 ft 2 in) | 91 kg (201 lb) | 14 October 1976 | Umeå | (United States) Minnesota Wild |
| 11 | F | Daniel Alfredsson – A | 182 cm (6 ft 0 in) | 90 kg (200 lb) | 11 December 1972 | Gothenburg | (Canada) Ottawa Senators |
| 22 | F | P. J. Axelsson | 185 cm (6 ft 1 in) | 86 kg (190 lb) | 26 February 1975 | Kungälv | (United States) Boston Bruins |
| 21 | F | Peter Forsberg | 183 cm (6 ft 0 in) | 93 kg (205 lb) | 20 July 1973 | Örnsköldsvik | (United States) Philadelphia Flyers |
| 51 | F | Mika Hannula | 179 cm (5 ft 10 in) | 84 kg (185 lb) | 2 April 1979 | Huddinge | (Sweden) HV71 |
| 96 | F | Tomas Holmström | 183 cm (6 ft 0 in) | 94 kg (207 lb) | 23 January 1973 | Piteå | (United States) Detroit Red Wings |
| 72 | F | Jörgen Jönsson | 184 cm (6 ft 0 in) | 89 kg (196 lb) | 29 September 1972 | Ängelholm | (Sweden) Färjestads BK |
| 33 | F | Fredrik Modin | 193 cm (6 ft 4 in) | 100 kg (220 lb) | 8 October 1974 | Sundsvall | (United States) Tampa Bay Lightning |
| 26 | F | Samuel Påhlsson | 181 cm (5 ft 11 in) | 94 kg (207 lb) | 17 December 1977 | Ånge | (United States) Mighty Ducks of Anaheim |
| 37 | F | Mikael Samuelsson | 186 cm (6 ft 1 in) | 94 kg (207 lb) | 23 December 1976 | Mariefred | (United States) Detroit Red Wings |
| 12 | F | Daniel Sedin | 186 cm (6 ft 1 in) | 90 kg (200 lb) | 26 September 1980 | Örnsköldsvik | (Canada) Vancouver Canucks |
| 20 | F | Henrik Sedin | 188 cm (6 ft 2 in) | 91 kg (201 lb) | 26 September 1980 | Örnsköldsvik | (Canada) Vancouver Canucks |
| 13 | F | Mats Sundin – C | 193 cm (6 ft 4 in) | 100 kg (220 lb) | 13 February 1971 | Bromma | (Canada) Toronto Maple Leafs |
| 40 | F | Henrik Zetterberg | 180 cm (5 ft 11 in) | 86 kg (190 lb) | 9 October 1980 | Njurunda | (United States) Detroit Red Wings |

Forward Markus Näslund was initially selected, but due to a groin injury he was replaced by Tomas Holmstrom

Round-robin

| Pos | Team | Pld | W | D | L | GF | GA | GD | Pts | Qualification |
|---|---|---|---|---|---|---|---|---|---|---|
| 1 | Slovakia | 5 | 5 | 0 | 0 | 18 | 8 | +10 | 10 | Quarterfinals |
| 2 | Russia | 5 | 4 | 0 | 1 | 23 | 11 | +12 | 8 | Quarterfinals |
| 3 | Sweden | 5 | 3 | 0 | 2 | 15 | 12 | +3 | 6 | Quarterfinals |
| 4 | United States | 5 | 1 | 1 | 3 | 13 | 13 | 0 | 3 | Quarterfinals |
| 5 | Kazakhstan | 5 | 1 | 0 | 4 | 9 | 16 | −7 | 2 | |
| 6 | Latvia | 5 | 0 | 1 | 4 | 11 | 29 | −18 | 1 | |

Source: IIHF

| 15 February 2006; 11:35 | Kazakhstan | 2–7 (0–3, 1–4, 1–0) | Sweden | Torino Esposizioni, Turin; Attendance: 2,200 |

Game reference

Vitali Yeremeyev
Goalies
Stefan Liv
Referee:
(Czech Republic) Vladimír Šindler
Linesmen:
(Finland) Stefan Fonselius
(Canada) Pierre Racicot

| | 0–1 | 7:45 – D. Tjärnqvist (J. Jönsson, T. Holmström) |
| | 0–2 | 10:46 – D. Alfredsson (PP) |
| | 0–3 | 16:06 – H. Sedin (M. Samuelsson, D. Sedin) |
| E. Koreshkov (SH) – 20:17 | 1–3 |
| | 1–4 | 28:47 – P. Axelsson (S. Påhlsson, M. Öhlund) |
| | 1–5 | 31:08 – M. Sundin (C. Bäckman, F. Modin) (PP) |
| | 1–6 | 35:31 – D. Sedin (M. Öhlund, H. Sedin) |
| | 1–7 | 36:21 – D. Tjärnqvist (P. Axelsson, S. Påhlsson) |
| V. Antipin (D. Upper) – 48:33 | 2–7 |

18 min
Penalties
6 min
14
Shots
34

| 16 February 2006; 16:05 | Sweden | 0–5 (0–0, 0–3, 0–2) | Russia | Palasport Olimpico, Turin; Attendance: 8,545 |

Game reference

Henrik Lundqvist
Goalies
Evgeni Nabokov
Referee:
(Canada) Don Van Massenhoven
Linesmen:
(Czech Republic) Petr Blümel
(Canada) Steve Miller

| 0–1 | 27:13 – A. Kovalev (A. Markov) (PP) |
| 0–2 | 28:05 – A. Ovechkin (A. Yashin) |
| 0–3 | 38:58 – M. Sushinsky (E. Malkin, S. Zhukov) |
| 0–4 | 50:31 – V. Kozlov (A. Frolov, A. Korolyuk) |
| 0–5 | 54:04 – M. Afinogenov (P. Datsyuk) |

20 min
Penalties
16 min
24
Shots
32

| 18 February 2006; 17:05 | Sweden | 6–1 (1–0, 4–0, 1–1) | Latvia | Palasport Olimpico, Turin; Attendance: 8,795 |

Game reference

Henrik Lundqvist
Goalies
Sergejs Naumovs
Referee:
(Canada) Paul Devorski
Linesmen:
(Canada) Derek Doucette
(Finland) Antti Hämäläinen

| S. Påhlsson (P. Forsberg) – 14:20 | 1–0 |
| N. Lidström (H. Zetterberg) (PP) – 22:22 | 2–0 |
| D. Alfredsson (K. Jönsson) (PP) – 24:59 | 3–0 |
| P. Axelsson (P. Forsberg) (PP) – 25:17 | 4–0 |
| H. Zetterberg (T. Holmström) – 27:58 | 5–0 |
| D. Alfredsson (M. Sundin, N. Lidström) – 44:48 | 6–0 |
| | 6–1 | 49:10 – M. Ziediņš (A. Ņiživijs, S. Ozoliņš) |

6 min
Penalties
14 min
40
Shots
14

| 19 February 2006; 17:05 | United States | 1–2 (1–1, 0–0, 0–1) | Sweden | Torino Esposizioni, Turin; Attendance: 4,450 |

Game reference

Rick DiPietro
Goalies
Henrik Lundqvist
Referee:
(Canada) Dan Marouelli
Linesmen:
(Germany) Thomas Gemeinhardt
(Canada) Steve Miller

| | 0–1 | 7:05 – D. Alfredsson (K. Jönsson, M. Sundin) |
| M. Modano (C. Conroy, C. Chelios) – 17:31 | 1–1 |
| | 1–2 | 44:22 – M. Samuelsson (D. Alfredsson, M. Sundin) (PP) |

14 min
Penalties
12 min
25
Shots
26

| 21 February 2006; 20:05 | Sweden | 0–3 (0–1, 0–0, 0–2) | Slovakia | Torino Esposizioni, Turin; Attendance: 4,250 |

Game reference

Mikael Tellqvist
Goalies
Karol Križan
Referee:
(Finland) Timo Favorin
Linesmen:
(Czech Republic) Petr Blümel
(Canada) Pierre Racicot

| 0–1 | 15:51 – P. Bondra (M. Šatan) |
| 0–2 | 46:16 – Mari. Hossa (P. Demitra, M. Gáborík) |
| 0–3 | 58:58 – R. Suchý (P. Demitra, Mari. Hossa) |

14 min
Penalties
10 min
17
Shots
31

Medal round

Quarterfinal

| 22 February 2006; 16:35 | Switzerland | 2–6 (1–2, 0–3, 1–1) | Sweden | Torino Esposizioni, Turin; Attendance: 2,970 |

Game reference

Martin Gerber
Goalies
Henrik Lundqvist
Referee:
(Canada) Dan Marouelli
Linesmen:
(United States) Thor Nelson
(Russia) Sergei Shelyanin

| | 0–1 | 3:05 – H. Sedin (D. Sedin, N. Lidström) |
| M. Streit (P. Della Rossa, M. Plüss) – 8:37 | 1–1 |
| | 1–2 | 13:49 – F. Modin (P. Forsberg, D. Alfredsson) (PP) |
| | 1–3 | 22:17 – H. Zetterberg (T. Holmström, K. Jönsson) |
| | 1–4 | 29:07 – M. Sundin (N. Lidström, D. Alfredsson) (PP) |
| | 1–5 | 32:52 – M. Sundin (P. Forsberg, D. Tjärnqvist) |
| R. Lemm (I. Rüthemann) – 40:49 | 2–5 |
| | 2–6 | 48:36 − S. Påhlsson (D. Alfredsson, P. Axelsson) |

8 min
Penalties
2 min
29
Shots
27

Semifinal

| 24 February 2006; 16:35 | Sweden | 7–3 (2–1, 4–2, 1–0) | Czech Republic | Palasport Olimpico, Turin; Attendance: 8,071 |

Game reference

Henrik Lundqvist
Goalies
Milan Hnilička (out 27:54)
Tomáš Vokoun (in 27:54)
Referee:
(Canada) Dan Marouelli
Linesmen:
(Finland) Antti Hämäläinen
(Canada) Pierre Racicot

| F. Modin (M. Sundin, P. Forsberg) – 0:34 | 1–0 |
| | 1–1 | 3:11 – F. Kuba (M. Straka, V. Prospal) |
| P. Axelsson (N. Lidström, N. Kronwall) – 13:37 | 2–1 |
| H. Sedin (D. Sedin) – 21:16 | 3–1 |
| C. Bäckman (D. Alfredsson) – 23:54 | 4–1 |
| J. Jönsson (K. Jönsson, M. Samuelsson) (PP) – 27:54 | 5–1 |
| | 5–2 | 30:40 – A. Hemský (J. Jágr, M. Židlický) (PP) |
| | 5–3 | 31:25 – V. Prospal (D. Výborný) |
| D. Alfredsson (P. Axelsson) – 39:00 | 6–3 |
| T. Holmström (H. Zetterberg) – 56:05 | 7–3 |

8 min
Penalties
6 min
32
Shots
24

Final

| 26 February 2006; 14:05 | Finland | 2–3 (1–0, 1–2, 0–1) | Sweden | Palasport Olimpico, Turin; Attendance: 8,274 |

Game reference

Antero Niittymäki
Goalies
Henrik Lundqvist
Referee:
(Canada) Paul Devorski
Linesmen:
(Slovakia) Milan Mášik
(United States) Thor Nelson

| K. Timonen (T. Selänne) (PP) – 14:45 | 1–0 |
| | 1–1 | 24:42 – H. Zetterberg (M. Samuelsson, C. Bäckman) (PP) |
| | 1–2 | 33:24 – N. Kronwall (H. Zetterberg) (PP) |
| V. Peltonen (J. Jokinen, O. Jokinen) – 35:00 | 2–2 |
| | 2–3 | 40:10 – N. Lidström (M. Sundin, P. Forsberg) |

14 min
Penalties
14 min
27
Shots
28

=== Women's ===
Roster

| Position | Name | Height | Weight | Birthdate | Birthplace | 2005–06 team |
|---|---|---|---|---|---|---|
| G | Cecilia Andersson | 179 cm (5 ft 10 1/2 in) | 74 kg (163 lb) | 4 October 1982 | Väddö | Concordia Stingers |
| G | Kim Martin | 167 cm (5 ft 5 1/2 in) | 71 kg (157 lb) | 28 February 1986 | Stockholm | AIK |
| D | Gunilla Andersson – A | 170 cm (5 ft 7 in) | 69 kg (152 lb) | 26 April 1975 | Skutskär | Mälarhöjden/Bredäng Hockey |
| D | Jenni Asserholt | 172 cm (5 ft 7 1/2 in) | 74 kg (163 lb) | 8 April 1988 | Örebro | Örebro HK |
| D | Joa Elfsberg | 177 cm (5 ft 9 1/2 in) | 73 kg (161 lb) | 30 July 1979 | Valbo | Brynäs IF |
| D | Emma Eliasson | 166 cm (5 ft 5 1/2 in) | 70 kg (150 lb) | 12 June 1989 | Kiruna | Modo Hockey |
| D | Ylva Lindberg | 166 cm (5 ft 5 1/2 in) | 67 kg (148 lb) | 29 June 1976 | Umeå | Mälarhöjden/Bredäng Hockey |
| F | Ann-Louise Edstrand | 178 cm (5 ft 10 in) | 67 kg (148 lb) | 25 April 1975 | Örnsköldsvik | Mälarhöjden/Bredäng Hockey |
| F | Erika Holst – C | 179 cm (5 ft 10 1/2 in) | 80 kg (180 lb) | 8 April 1979 | Varberg | Mälarhöjden/Bredäng Hockey |
| F | Nanna Jansson | 172 cm (5 ft 7 1/2 in) | 67 kg (148 lb) | 7 July 1983 | Gävle | Brynäs IF |
| F | Jenny Lindqvist | 169 cm (5 ft 6 1/2 in) | 70 kg (150 lb) | 21 July 1978 | Stockholm | Mälarhöjden/Bredäng Hockey |
| F | Kristina Lundberg | 172 cm (5 ft 7 1/2 in) | 86 kg (190 lb) | 10 June 1985 | Husum | Modo Hockey |
| D | Frida Nevalainen | 164 cm (5 ft 4 1/2 in) | 65 kg (143 lb) | 27 January 1987 | Umeå | Modo Hockey |
| F | Emilie O'Konor | 170 cm (5 ft 7 in) | 70 kg (150 lb) | 21 February 1983 | Danderyd | AIK |
| F | Maria Rooth – A | 175 cm (5 ft 9 in) | 75 kg (165 lb) | 2 November 1979 | Ängelholm | Mälarhöjden/Bredäng Hockey |
| F | Danijela Rundqvist | 176 cm (5 ft 9 1/2 in) | 71 kg (157 lb) | 26 September 1984 | Stockholm | AIK |
| F | Therése Sjölander | 173 cm (5 ft 8 in) | 69 kg (152 lb) | 4 May 1981 | Sollefteå | Modo Hockey |
| F | Katarina Timglas | 168 cm (5 ft 6 in) | 64 kg (141 lb) | 24 November 1985 | Malmö | AIK |
| F | Anna Vikman | 168 cm (5 ft 6 in) | 74 kg (163 lb) | 13 January 1981 | Överkalix | Modo Hockey |
| F | Pernilla Winberg | 164 cm (5 ft 4 1/2 in) | 60 kg (130 lb) | 24 February 1989 | Limhamn | AIK |

Results

Round-robin

| Pos | Team | Pld | W | D | L | GF | GA | GD | Pts | Qualification |
|---|---|---|---|---|---|---|---|---|---|---|
| 1 | Canada | 3 | 3 | 0 | 0 | 36 | 1 | +35 | 6 | Semifinals |
| 2 | Sweden | 3 | 2 | 0 | 1 | 15 | 9 | +6 | 4 | Semifinals |
| 3 | Russia | 3 | 1 | 0 | 2 | 6 | 16 | −10 | 2 | 5–8th place semifinals |
| 4 | Italy (H) | 3 | 0 | 0 | 3 | 1 | 32 | −31 | 0 | 5–8th place semifinals |

(H) Hosts

| 11 February 2006; 15:35 | Sweden | 3–1 (0–0, 2–1, 1–0) | Russia | Palasport Olimpico, Turin; Attendance: 6,500 |

Game reference

Kim Martin
Goalies
Irina Gashennikova
Referee:
(Canada) Stephanie Normand
Linesmen:
(Germany) Michaela Kiefer
(United States) Julie Piacentini

| Jansson (Lindberg, Winberg) (PP) – 23:26 | 1–0 |
| Timglas (Rooth, O'Konor) (PP) – 25:14 | 2–0 |
| | 2–1 | 39:21 – Trefilova |
| Rooth (G. Andersson) (PP) – 40:32 | 3–1 |

14 min
Penalties
14 min
24
Shots
31

| 13 February 2006; 15:05 | Sweden | 11–0 (3–0, 5–0, 3–0) | Italy | Torino Esposizioni, Turin; Attendance: 2,156 |

Game reference

Cecilia Andersson
Goalies
Debora Montanari
Luana Frasnelli
Referee:
(Czech Republic) Kateřina Ivičičová
Linesmen:
(Norway) Marte Hove
(Finland) Johanna Suban

| Sjolander (Winberg) (PP) – 07:09 | 1–0 |
| Sjolander (Lindberg, Asserholt) (PP) – 15:45 | 2–0 |
| G. Andersson (Holst) – 18:15 | 3–0 |
| Jansson (Eliasson) – 20:59 | 4–0 |
| Holst (Rooth) – 25:05 | 5–0 |
| Edstrand (Sjolander) – 31:45 | 6–0 |
| Rooth (Holst) (SH) – 32:37 | 7–0 |
| G. Andersson (Nevalainen) – 34:16 | 8–0 |
| Sjolander (Nevalainen, Asserholt) – 49:31 | 9–0 |
| Rooth (G. Andersson) (PP) – 50:55 | 10–0 |
| Edstrand (Rooth, G. Andersson) (PP) – 58:08 | 11–0 |

16 min
Penalties
22 min
52
Shots
4

| 14 February 2006; 15:35 | Canada | 8–1 (2–0, 5–1, 1–0) | Sweden | Palasport Olimpico, Turin; Attendance: 6,850 |

Game reference

Kim St-Pierre
Goalies
Cecilia Andersson
Referee:
(Finland) Anu Hirvonen
Linesmen:
(Finland) Sanna Mattila
(United States) Julie Piacentini

| Apps – 04:36 | 1–0 |
| Wickenheiser (Pounder) – 12:28 | 2–0 |
| Apps (PP) – 23:53 | 3–0 |
| Apps (Wickenheiser, Piper) – 30:58 | 4–0 |
| Goyette (Piper, Campbell) (PP) – 34:02 | 5–0 |
| | 5–1 | 36:12 – Lindberg (Jansson, Winberg) (PP) |
| Weatherston (Kingsbury) – 37:25 | 6–1 |
| Hefford (PP) – 38:53 | 7–1 |
| Goyette (Piper, Wickenheiser) (PP) – 46:02 | 8–1 |

14 min
Penalties
16 min
47
Shots
8

Medal round

Semifinal

| 17 February 2006; 17:05 | United States | 2–3 GWS (1–0, 1–2, 0–0) (OT: 0–0) (SO: 0–1) | Sweden | Palasport Olimpico, Turin; Attendance: 5,654 |

Game reference

Chanda Gunn
Goalies
Kim Martin
Referee:
(United Kingdom) Joy Tottman
Linesmen:
(Finland) Sanna Mattila
(Finland) Johanna Suban

| Kr. King (Potter, Chu) (PP) – 11:55 | 1–0 |
| Stephens (Wall, Darwitz) (PP) – 21:04 | 2–0 |
| | 2–1 | 26:17 – Rooth (O'Konor) |
| | 2–2 | 29:40 – Rooth (Holst) (SH) |

Darwitz (miss)
Potter (miss)
Ruggiero (miss)
Wendell (miss)
Shootout
(miss) Holst
(miss) Jansson
Winberg
Rooth
12 min
Penalties
22 min
39
Shots
18

Final

| 20 February 2006; 20:35 | (silver) Sweden | 1–4 (0–2, 0–2, 1–0) | Canada (gold) | Palasport Olimpico, Turin; Attendance: 6,664 |

Game reference

Kim Martin
Goalies
Charline Labonté
Referee:
(Finland) Anu Hirvonen
Linesmen:
(Czech Republic) Klára Quagliato
(Finland) Johanna Suban

| | 0–1 | 03:15 – Apps (Wickenheiser) |
| | 0–2 | 12:13 – Ouellette (Hefford, Botterill) |
| | 0–3 | 28:58 – Piper (Wickenheiser, Pounder) |
| | 0–4 | 30:27 – Hefford (Botterill, Vaillancourt) |
| G. Andersson (Holst, Rooth) (PP) – 45:24 | 1–4 |

6 min
Penalties
12 min
8
Shots
26

== Snowboarding ==
Thirteen snowboarders represented Sweden across the three events, but only one, Maria Danielsson, earned a top-ten finish, which Danielsson did in the women's snowboard cross.

Halfpipe

| Athlete | Event | Qualifying run 1 | | Qualifying run 2 | | Final | | |
| Athlete | Event | Points | Rank | Points | Rank | Run 1 | Run 2 | Rank |
|---|---|---|---|---|---|---|---|---|
| Stefan Karlsson | Men's halfpipe | 11.5 | 39 | 8.7 | 34 | did not advance | | 40 |
| Micael Lundmark | Men's halfpipe | 32.5 | 13 | 27.2 | 21 | did not advance | | 27 |
| Anna Olofsson | Women's halfpipe | 27.4 | 15 | 24.4 | 16 | did not advance | | 22 |
| Mikael Sandy | Men's halfpipe | 19.7 | 29 | 14.0 | 30 | did not advance | | 36 |

Note: In the final, the single best score from two runs is used to determine the ranking. A bracketed score indicates a run that wasn't counted.

Parallel GS

| Athlete | Event | Qualification | | Round of 16 | Quarterfinals | Semifinals | Finals | |
| Athlete | Event | Time | Rank | Opposition time | Opposition time | Opposition time | Opposition time | Rank |
|---|---|---|---|---|---|---|---|---|
| Daniel Biveson | Men's parallel giant slalom | 1:12.15 | 16 Q | Schoch (SUI) (1); L +0.52 (+0.14 +0.38) | did not advance | | | 16 |
| Filip Fischer | Men's parallel giant slalom | 1:13.43 | 23 | did not advance | | | | 23 |
| Sara Fischer | Women's parallel giant slalom | did not finish | | | | | | 30 |
| Aprilia Hägglöf | Women's parallel giant slalom | 1:12.15 | 16 Q | Tudigescheva (RUS) (1); L +1.13 (+0.34 +0.79) | did not advance | | | 16 |
| Richard Richardsson | Men's parallel giant slalom | 1:11.46 | 11 Q | Grabner (AUT) (6); L +1.44 (+0.37 +1.07) | did not advance | | | 12 |

Key: '+ Time' represents a deficit; the brackets indicate the results of each run.

Snowboard Cross

| Athlete | Event | Qualifying | | 1/8 finals | Quarterfinals | Semifinals | Finals | |
| Athlete | Event | Time | Rank | Position | Position | Position | Position | Rank |
|---|---|---|---|---|---|---|---|---|
| Mattias Blomberg | Men's snowboard cross | 1:22.48 | 24 Q | 3 | did not advance | | | 28 |
| Maria Danielsson | Women's snowboard cross | 1:30.01 | 5 Q | n/a | 2 Q | 4 | Classification 5-8; 2 | 6 |
| Jonte Grundelius | Men's snowboard cross | 1:21.85 | 14 Q | 4 | did not advance | | | 21 |
| Jonatan Johansson | Men's snowboard cross | 1:23.38 | 31 Q | 2 | 3 | did not advance | Classification 9-12; 4 | 12 |

== Speed skating ==
In the 1000 metres, Erik Zachrisson blocked Russia's Dmitry Dorofeyev, who was ahead of the pace of gold medalist Shani Davis at the time. Zachrisson ended up being disqualified.

| Athlete | Event | Race 1 | | Final | |
| Athlete | Event | Time | Rank | Time | Rank |
|---|---|---|---|---|---|
| Johan Röjler | Men's 1500 m | n/a | | 1:50.50 | 33 |
| Johan Röjler | Men's 5000 m | n/a | | 6:29.24 | 12 |
| Johan Röjler | Men's 10000 m | n/a | | 13:29.50 | 10 |
| Erik Zachrisson | Men's 500 m | 35.80 | 35.81 | 1:11.61 | 20 |
| Erik Zachrisson | Men's 1000 m | disqualified | | | |

== Further reference ==
- 2006 Team Book Sweden from the Swedish Olympic Committee, retrieved 22 January 2006.
