= Ice hockey at the 2006 Winter Olympics =

Ice hockey at the XX Olympic Winter Games
- Venues: Torino Palasport Olimpico; Torino Esposizioni
- Dates: 11–26 February 2006

Men's ice hockey at the XX Olympic Winter Games

Medalists
1st place, gold medalist(s)		Sweden
2nd place, silver medalist(s)		Finland
3rd place, bronze medalist(s)		Czech Republic

Women's ice hockey at the XX Olympic Winter Games

Medalists
1st place, gold medalist(s)		Canada
2nd place, silver medalist(s)		Sweden
3rd place, bronze medalist(s)		United States

Ice hockey at the 2006 Winter Olympics was held at the Torino Palasport Olimpico and the Torino Esposizioni in Turin, Italy. The men's competition, held from 15 to 26 February, was won by Sweden, and the women's competition, held from 11 to 20 February, was won by Canada.

== Medal summary ==
=== Medal table ===
Rank	Nation	Gold	Silver	Bronze	Total
1	Sweden	1	1	0	2
2	Canada	1	0	0	1
3	Finland	0	1	0	1
4	Czech Republic	0	0	1	1
4	United States	0	0	1	1
Totals (5 entries)		2	2	2	6

=== Medalists ===
Event	Gold	Silver	Bronze
Men's	Sweden; Daniel Alfredsson; Per-Johan Axelsson; Christian Bäckman; Peter Forsberg; Mika Hannula; Niclas Hävelid; Tomas Holmström; Jörgen Jönsson; Kenny Jönsson; Niklas Kronwall; Nicklas Lidström; Stefan Liv; Henrik Lundqvist; Fredrik Modin; Mattias Öhlund; Samuel Påhlsson; Mikael Samuelsson; Daniel Sedin; Henrik Sedin; Mats Sundin; Ronnie Sundin; Mikael Tellqvist; Daniel Tjärnqvist; Henrik Zetterberg	Finland; Niklas Bäckström; Aki Berg; Niklas Hagman; Jukka Hentunen; Jussi Jokinen; Olli Jokinen; Niko Kapanen; Mikko Koivu; Saku Koivu; Lasse Kukkonen; Antti Laaksonen; Jere Lehtinen; Toni Lydman; Antti-Jussi Niemi; Ville Nieminen; Antero Niittymäki; Petteri Nummelin; Teppo Numminen; Fredrik Norrena; Ville Peltonen; Jarkko Ruutu; Sami Salo; Teemu Selänne; Kimmo Timonen	Czech Republic; Jan Bulis; Petr Čajánek; Patrik Eliáš; Martin Erat; Dominik Hašek; Milan Hejduk; Aleš Hemský; Milan Hnilička; Jaromír Jágr; František Kaberle; Tomáš Kaberle; Filip Kuba; Pavel Kubina; Aleš Kotalík; Robert Lang; Marek Malík; Rostislav Olesz; Václav Prospal; Martin Ručinský; Dušan Salfický; Jaroslav Špaček; Martin Straka; Tomáš Vokoun; David Výborný; Marek Židlický
Women's	Canada; Meghan Agosta; Gillian Apps; Jennifer Botterill; Cassie Campbell; Gillian Ferrari; Danielle Goyette; Jayna Hefford; Becky Kellar; Gina Kingsbury; Charline Labonté; Carla MacLeod; Caroline Ouellette; Cherie Piper; Cheryl Pounder; Colleen Sostorics; Kim St-Pierre; Vicky Sunohara; Sarah Vaillancourt; Katie Weatherston; Hayley Wickenheiser	Sweden; Cecilia Andersson; Gunilla Andersson; Jenni Asserholt; Ann-Louise Edstrand; Joa Elfsberg; Emma Eliasson; Erika Holst; Nanna Jansson; Ylva Lindberg; Jenny Lindqvist; Kristina Lundberg; Kim Martin; Frida Nevalainen; Emilie O'Konor; Maria Rooth; Danijela Rundqvist; Therese Sjölander; Katarina Timglas; Anna Vikman; Pernilla Winberg	United States; Caitlin Cahow; Julie Chu; Natalie Darwitz; Pam Dreyer; Tricia Dunn-Luoma; Molly Engstrom; Chanda Gunn; Jamie Hagerman; Kim Insalaco; Kathleen Kauth; Courtney Kennedy; Katie King; Kristin King; Sarah Parsons; Jenny Potter; Helen Resor; Angela Ruggiero; Kelly Stephens; Lyndsay Wall; Krissy Wendell

== Men's competition ==
The format was changed from the version used in the 1998 and 2002 tournaments. This format was used in 1992 and 1994, the number of teams was reduced from 14 to 12 and the preliminary and final group stages were combined to form two six-team groups with the top four from each group advancing to the quarterfinals.

These changes had the following effects:

- They increased the number of group games played by the "Super Six", who previously automatically qualified for the final group stage, from three to five.
- They ensured that only four teams from each group would advance to the knock-out stage. This would give the games more meaning.

=== Qualification ===
Twelve places were allotted for the men's ice hockey tournament. The first eight were awarded to the top eight teams in the International Ice Hockey Federation ranking following the 2004 Men's World Ice Hockey Championships. Those teams were:

1. Canada
2. Sweden
3. Slovakia
4. Czech Republic
5. Finland
6. United States
7. Russia
8. Germany

== Women's competition ==
=== Qualification ===
The top four teams from the International Ice Hockey Federation world rankings following the 2004 Women's World Ice Hockey Championships qualified automatically. These teams were Canada, the United States, Finland and Sweden. Italy also gained a place as it was the host nation. Russia, Germany, and Switzerland qualified for the last three places through qualification tournaments.
