= Mälarhöjden/Bredäng Hockey =

Ice hockey club in Sweden

- City: Stockholm
- League: Women's Division 1 East
- Founded: 1988; 38 years ago
- Home arena: SDC-hallen (capacity 850)
- Colours: Red, white
- General manager: Mikael Svensson
- Head coach: Leif Åhs

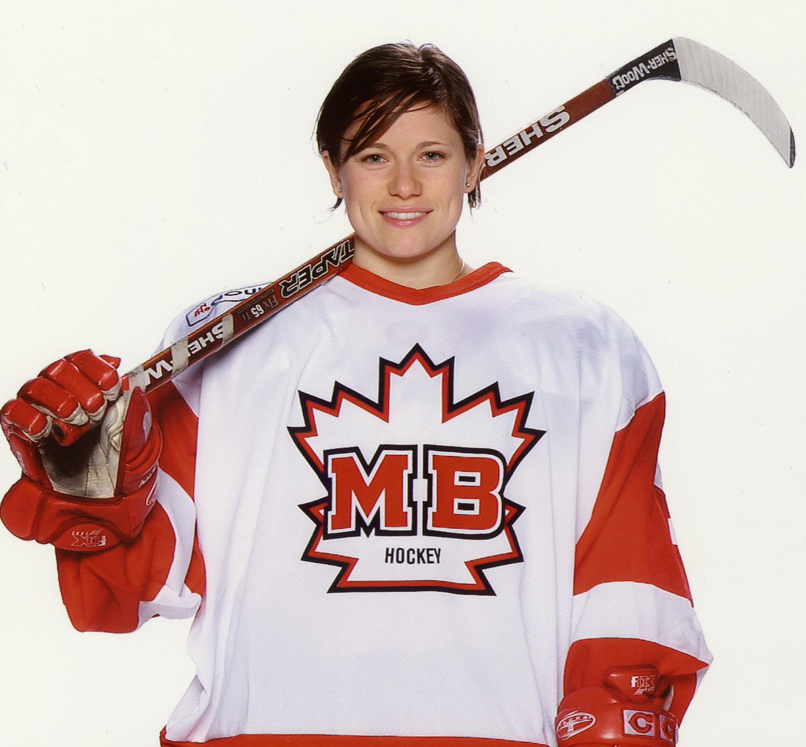
Mia Larsson of Mälarhöjden/Bredäng Hockey

Mälarhöjden/Bredäng Hockey, often referred to as MB Hockey or MB, is an ice hockey club based in Stockholm, Sweden, founded in 1988. The women's team has won the Swedish women's championship on seven occasions, in 1999, 2000, 2001, 2002, 2003, 2005, and 2006.

== History ==
Named after the districts where it is located, the club was founded in 1988 through a merger between Mälarhöjden/Västertorp and Bredäng/Östberga hockey clubs.

Until the 2006–07 season MB Hockey had sections for both men's and women's ice hockey, and while the men's team has never reached higher than the 3rd tier league, the women's team playing in the top level league established itself as one of the most successful in the nation, winning seven Swedish championships in eight years.

Before the start of the 2006–07 season the club decided to cancel their programme for women's hockey and a majority of the players went on to play for neighbouring Segeltorps IF.

== Notable players ==
The most notable players on MB Hockey's women's team included six on the Swedish national women's ice hockey team that participated in the Turin 2006 Winter Olympic Games:

- Erika Holst – C
- Maria Rooth – A
- Gunilla Andersson – A
- Ann-Louise Edstrand
- Ylva Lindberg
- Jenny Lindqvist
