= Rinor Nushi =

Association football player

Personal information
- Date of birth: 11 January 1996 (age 30)
- Height: 1.75 m (5 ft 9 in)
- Position: Forward

Team information
- Current team: Segeltorps IF

Youth career
- 2013: West Ham

Senior career*
Years	Team	Apps	(Gls)
2011–2012	AFC Eskilstuna	6+	(1+)
2013–2017	AFC Eskilstuna	44	(7)
2017–2018	VSK	26	(7)
2019	Sollentuna FK	13	(0)
2019	Newroz FC	9	(2)
2020-	Segeltorps IF	28	(12)
- * Club domestic league appearances and goals

Rinor Nushi (born 11 January 1996) is a Swedish footballer who plays as a forward for Segeltorps IF.

== Career ==
At the age of 14, Nushi trained with the youth academy of Spanish La Liga side Barcelona. He started his career with AFC Eskilstuna in the Swedish sixth division. Before the second half of 2012–13, Nushi signed for the reserves of English Premier League club West Ham after training with Juventus in the Italian Serie A and Dutch team FC Twente.

In 2013, he returned to AFC Eskilstuna in the Swedish third division, helping them earn promotion to the Swedish top flight within four seasons. In 2019, he signed for Swedish fourth division outfit Newroz FC. Before the 2020 season, Nushi signed for Segeltorps IF in the Swedish fifth division.
