= Erika Holst =

Swedish ice hockey player (born 1979)

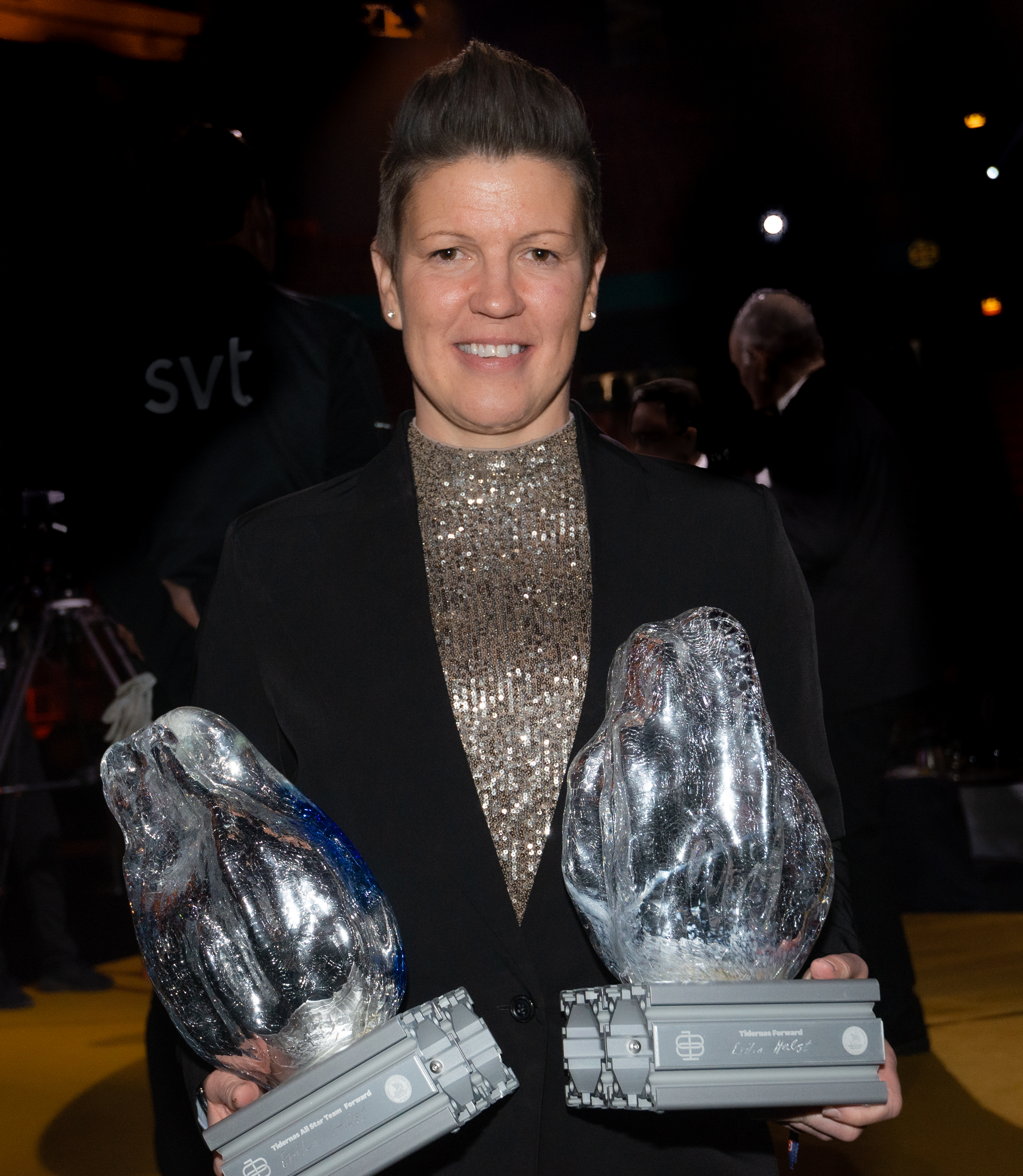
- Born: 8 April 1979 (age 47) Varberg, Sweden
- Height: 5 ft 10 in (178 cm)
- Weight: 159 lb (72 kg; 11 st 5 lb)
- Position: Centre
- Shot: Left
- Played for: Minnesota Duluth Bulldogs; Linhamn BK; M/B Hockey; Segeltorps IF
- National team: Sweden
- Playing career: 1994–2013
Medal record
Women's ice hockey
Representing Sweden
Olympic Games
Silver medal – second place	2006 Turin	Team
Bronze medal – third place	2002 Salt Lake City	Team
World Championships
Bronze medal – third place	2005 Sweden
Bronze medal – third place	2007 Canada

Ylva Erika Holst (born 8 April 1979) is a Swedish former ice hockey player. She was a member of the Sweden women's national ice hockey team. She won a silver medal at the 2006 Winter Olympics and a bronze medal at the 2002 Winter Olympics.

== Playing career ==
=== Minnesota Duluth ===
Born in Varberg, Sweden, Holst played for the Minnesota Duluth Bulldogs women's ice hockey program. She was part of the Bulldogs team that won the first three NCAA women's championships in 2001, 2002 and 2003.

=== Sweden ===
She played with the Segeltorps IF in the Riksserien (Sweden league elite). She has represented Sweden in nine Women's World Ice Hockey Championships. In ice hockey at the 2002 Winter Olympics, Holst led the Swedish team with five points in five games. This marked the second Olympics in which she was the team leader in scoring. Four years later, in the win over the United States in the semifinal game in Turin, Holst had one assist.

== Personal ==
Holst came out as lesbian in 2006, along with fellow hockey player Ylva Lindberg.
