= Women's ice hockey in Sweden =

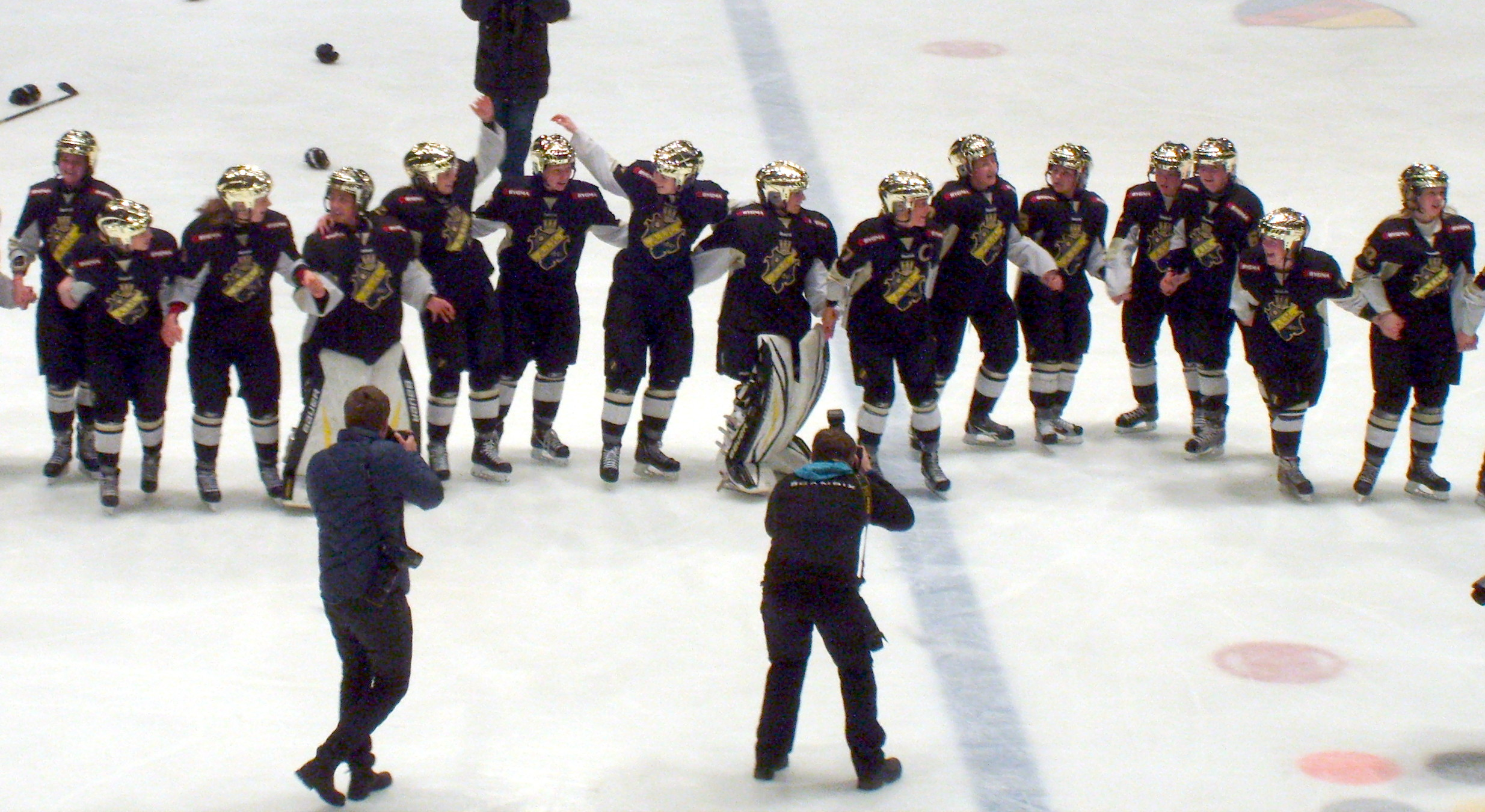
- 2013 Swedish Championship winners AIK IF Dam
- Country: Sweden
- Governing body: Swedish Ice Hockey Association
- National teams: Women (Damkronorna); Women under-18
- First played: Organized game, 1969; National Championship (unofficial), 1984–85; National team game, 1987; Swedish Championship, 1987–88
- Registered players: 5,973 (2020)

National competitions
- Swedish Women's Hockey League; Nationella Damhockeyligan; DamTvåan

International competitions
- Olympic Games; IIHF World Women's Championships; 4 Nations Cup; IIHF World Women's U18 Championships; IIHF European Women Championships

Ice hockey is one of Sweden's most popular sports and participation in women's ice hockey is increasing; the number of registered women's ice hockey players in Sweden increased from 3,425 in 2011 to 5,973 in 2020.

== History ==
The first organized women's ice hockey game in Sweden was played in 1969 between Modo AIK and Timrå IK. The Swedish women's national team played its first games in April 1987, during the 1987 Women's World Tournament in Ontario, Canada.

The first, unofficial National Championship was played in 1985. Three unofficial championships were held, in 1984–85, 1985–86, and 1986–87. The championships were played with round-robin tournament structure. Nacka HK won the National Championship title in all three seasons.

The Swedish Ice Hockey Association (SIF) established the first, official Swedish Championship for the 1987–88 season. Division 1 served as the qualifying league for the Swedish Championship. This league had a variable number of teams distributed into some small regional leagues, followed by a national playoff.

During the 2007–08 season, the best Division 1 teams qualified for a new league, the Riksserien (‘National Series’), which became the top-tier league. Division 1 became the second level of women's hockey in Sweden. The Riksserien comprised eight teams. Each team would face the seven opposing teams in four games, two at home and two away. The top two teams at the end of the regular season would qualify for the semi-finals. The teams classified in third to sixth place would each play a three-game playoff qualifying series. In the semifinals, the match for the third place and final depend on a simple match. The teams ranked seventh and eighth at the end of the regular season would face the top two from Division 1 in a promotion/relegation series to remain in the Swedish Women's Hockey League or be relegated Division 1

The Riksserien was reorganized and rebranded as the Svenska damhockeyligan (SDHL, lit. 'Swedish Women's Hockey League') prior to the 2016–17 season. The change was meant to increase public interest and sponsorship of the teams by branding the league in the style of the Swedish Hockey League (SHL) and to encourage SHL teams to promote their sister teams.

== Domestic league structure ==
1. Swedish Women's Hockey League (SDHL; Swedish: Svenska damhockeyligan), organized by the Swedish Ice Hockey Association
  - 10 teams
  - 36 games in regular season
  - Playoffs for top eight teams, winner is named Swedish Ice Hockey Champion
  - Bottom two teams progress to qualifiers against top teams from Nationella Damhockeyligan, relegation to NDHL DamEttan is possible
2. Nationella Damhockeyligan (NDHL; lit. 'National Women's Hockey League'), comprises multiple stages of play that are organized by regional organs of the SIF (NDHL DamEttan) or by the Swedish Ice Hockey Association itself (Dam HockeyAllsvenskan)
  - 25 teams began the 2022–23 season in the NDHL DamEttan regional series, split into four geographic divisions: Norra (North), Östra (East), Södra (South), and Västra (West)
    - NDHL DamEttan Norra: 5 teams (30 games per team)
    - NDHL DamEttan Östra: 6 teams (14 games per team)
    - NDHL DamEttan Södra: 8 teams (21 games per team)
    - NDHL DamEttan Västra: 7 teams (20 games per team)
  - Two teams from the top of each division move on to the Dam HockeyAllsvenskan, and are grouped geographically in two divisions: Norra and Södra
    - Dam HockeyAllsvenskan Norra: 4 teams (6 games per team)
    - Dam HockeyAllsvenskan Södra: 4 teams (6 games per team)
  - Playoffs for top-three teams from each Dam HockeyAllsvenskan division, plus the top-two teams from regional qualification (Swedish: regionalt förkval); uses the Dam HockeyAllsvenskan two-division structure and two league champions are named each season
  - Dam HockeyAllsvenskan champions proceed to qualifiers against the bottom teams from SDHL, in which promotion to SDHL is possible
  - Team finishing the regular season with the fewest points of any team in the league is relegated to DamTvåan
3. DamTvåan, organized by regional organs of the Swedish Ice Hockey Association
  - 15 teams in the 2019–20 season, split into three geographic regions: Södra (South), Västra (West), and Norra (North)
    - DamTvåan Södra: 4 teams
    - DamTvåan Västra: 7 teams
    - DamTvåan Norra: 4 teams
  - Number of games in regular season varies by region, from 6–12 games in 2019–20 regular season
    - DamTvåan, Region Norr: 6 games
    - DamTvåan Västra: 12 games
    - DamTvåan, Region Syd: 9 games
  - Team finishing the regular season with the most points of any team in the league gains promotion to NDHL DamEttan
4. Various local and district-level recreational leagues, regulated by the Swedish Ice Hockey Association but generally overseen by constituent entities

== Swedish Championship ==
=== Results ===
Season	Champion	Runner-up	Score	Bronze
National Championship (Riksmästerskapet) (Note: The National Championship (Riksmästerskapet) was played for three seasons before the introduction of the Swedish Championship by the Swedish Ice Hockey Association in 1987. The National Championships are widely regarded as unofficial Swedish Championships.)
1984–85	Nacka HK	Modo AIK	round-robin	Diö GoIF
1985–86	Nacka HK	Danderyds SK	round-robin	Modo AIK
1986–87	Nacka HK	Modo AIK	round-robin	Diö GoIF
Swedish Championship (Svenska mästerskapet)
1987–88	Nacka HK	FoC Farsta	11–0	Modo Hockey
1988–89	Nacka HK	Modo Hockey	3–2	Alvesta SK
1989–90	Nacka HK	Alvesta SK	7–0	FoC Farsta
1990–91	Nacka HK	Alvesta SK	9–0	FoC Farsta
1991–92	Nacka HK	FoC Farsta	3–1	Brynäs IF
1992–93	Nacka HK	FoC Farsta	4–3	Vallentuna BK
1993–94	Nacka HK	FoC Farsta	3–0	Brynäs IF
1994–95	Foc Farsta	Nacka HK	5–1	Västerhaninge IF
1995–96	Nacka HK	FoC Farsta	6–5	Västerhaninge IF
1996–97	Foc Farsta	Västerhaninge IF	4–3	Nacka HK
1997–98	Nacka HK	FoC Farsta	3–0	Veddige HK
1998–99	M/B Hockey	AIK IF	8–1	Modo Hockey
1999–00	M/B Hockey	AIK IF	4–3	Veddige HK
2000–01	M/B Hockey	AIK IF	6–3	Modo Hockey
2001–02	M/B Hockey	Modo Hockey	9–1	AIK IF
2002–03	M/B Hockey	AIK IF	7–3	Modo Hockey
2003–04	AIK IF	Limhamn Limeburners HC	5–2	M/B Hockey
2004–05	M/B Hockey	AIK IF	4–3	Modo Hockey
2005–06	M/B Hockey	Modo Hockey	2–1	Örebro HK
2006–07	AIK IF	Segeltorps IF	2–1 OT	Modo Hockey
Riksserien
2007–08	Segeltorps IF	AIK IF	5–2	Modo Hockey
2008–09	AIK IF	Segeltorps IF	5–0	Modo Hockey
2009–10	Segeltorps IF	Brynäs IF	6–0	Modo Hockey
2010–11	Segeltorps IF	Brynäs IF	2–1 OT	Modo Hockey
2011–12	Modo Hockey	Brynäs IF	1–0	Segeltorps IF
2012–13	AIK IF	Brynäs IF	2–1	(Note: Bronze medals were officially awarded from 1988 until 2012, at which time the playoff system was restructured. Since the 2012–13 season, no bronze medals have been awarded.)
2013–14	Linköpings HC	Modo HK	3–2 OT	–
2014–15	Linköpings HC	AIK IF	5–0	–
2015–16	Luleå HF	Linköpings HC	4–1	–
Swedish Women's Hockey League (Svenska damhockeyligan)
2016–17	Djurgårdens IF	HV71	2–0	–
2017–18	Luleå HF	Linköpings HC	2–0	–
2018–19	Luleå HF	Linköpings HC	3–2	–
2019–20	Playoffs cancelled due to the COVID-19 pandemic in Sweden			

=== All-time medal count ===
Updated 1 August 2020

	Team	1st place, gold medalist(s)	2nd place, silver medalist(s)	3rd place, bronze medalist(s)	Total
1	Nacka HK	9	1	1	11
2	M/B Hockey	7	0	1	8
3	AIK IF	4	6	1	11
4	Segeltorps IF	3	2	0	5
5	Luleå HF/MSSK	3	0	0	3
6	FOC Farsta	2	6	2	10
7	MODO Hockey	1	4	9	14
8	Linköpings HC	1	2	1	4
9	Djurgården IF	1	0	0	1
10	Brynäs IF	0	4	2	6
11	Alvesta SK	0	2	1	3
12	Västerhaninge IF	0	1	2	3
13	Limhamn HC	0	1	0	1
13	HV71	0	1	0	1
15	Veddige HK	0	0	2	2
16	Vallentuna BK	0	0	1	1
16	Örebro HUF	0	0	1	1

== Teams 2010–11 ==
=== Riksserien ===
- AIK IF
- Brynäs IF
- Leksands IF
- Linköpings HC
- MODO Hockey
- Munksund-Skuthamns SK
- Ormsta HC
- Segeltorps IF

=== Division I Region South A ===
- Grästorp IK
- Hisingen IK
- Hovås HC/Järnbrott
- Lerums BK
- Munkedal/Stenungsund
- Trollhättan HC
- Vårgårda HC

=== Division I Region South B ===
- Borås HC
- HV71 Queens
- IF Malmö Redhawks
- Karlskrona HK
- Motala AIF Hockey
- Rögle BK
- Växjö Lakers

=== Division I Region West ===
- Skogsbo SK
- Hällefors/Lindlöven
- Sandviken IK
- Malungs IF
- VIK Västerås HK Ungdom
- Leksands IF 2
- Kristinehamns HT

=== Division I Region East ===
- AIK 2
- Almtuna IS
- Järfälla HC
- Ormsta Hockey 2
- Tullinge TP
- Södertälje SK
- Segeltorps IF 2
- Västerhaninge IF

=== Division I Region North ===
- Modo Hockey Junior
- Clemnsnäs HC
- Luleå HF
- Sundsvall Wildcats
- IF Björklöven

== Tournaments ==
The following are IIHF tournaments that were hosted in Sweden.

Event	Location	Finish
2003 4 Nations Cup	Skövde	Fourth
2004–05 IIHF European Women's Champions Cup	Solna	(bronze) Gold for AIK IF
2005 Women's World Ice Hockey Championships	Linköping, Norrköping	(bronze) Bronze
2005–06 IIHF European Women's Champions Cup	Solna	(bronze) Gold for AIK IF
2006–07 IIHF European Women's Champions Cup	Katrineholm	(bronze) Gold for AIK IF
2007 4 Nations Cup	Leksand	Fourth
2007–08 IIHF European Women's Champions Cup	Vallentuna	(bronze) Gold for AIK IF
2011 IIHF World Women's U18 Championship	Stockholm, Sweden	No medal

== See also ==
- Sweden women's national ice hockey team

== Links ==
- swehockey.se (in Swedish)
- www.svenskdamhockey.se (in Swedish)
