= Gunilla Andersson =

Swedish ice hockey player

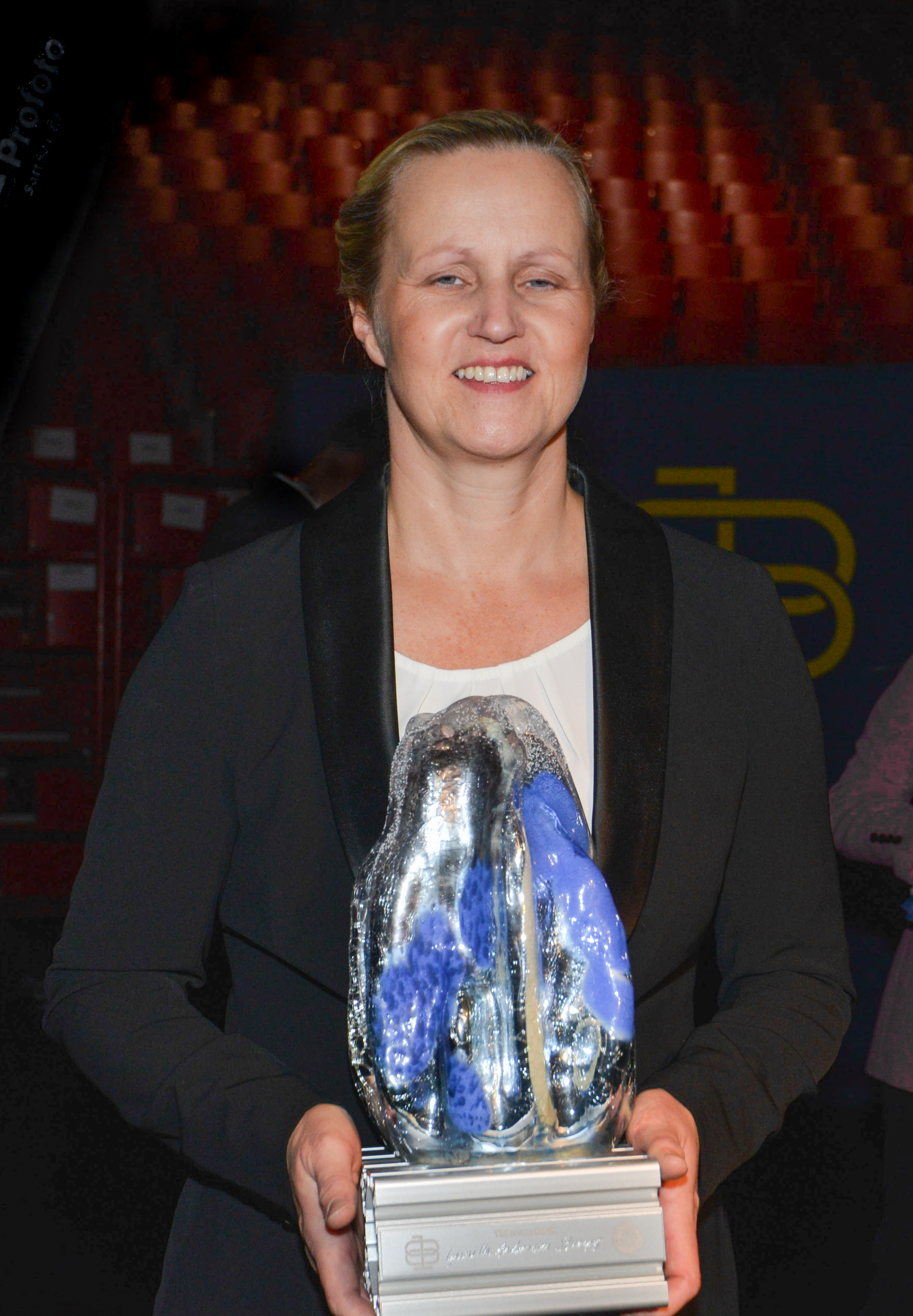

Personal information
- Born: 26 April 1975 (age 51) Skutskär, Sweden
- Height: 5 ft 7 in (170 cm)
- Weight: 152 lb (69 kg)

Sport
- Sport: Ice hockey
- Club: MB Hockey, Stockholm; Segeltorps IF, Segeltorp
Medal record
Women's ice hockey
Representing Sweden
Olympic Games
Silver medal – second place	2006 Turin	Team
Bronze medal – third place	2002 Salt Lake City	Team
World Championships
Bronze medal – third place	2005 Sweden
Bronze medal – third place	2007 Canada

Gunilla Victoria Andersson (born April 26, 1975) is an ice hockey player from Sweden. Andersson played Defense for the Sweden women's national ice hockey team, winning a silver medal at the 2006 Winter Olympics and a bronze medal at the 2002 Winter Olympics.

Also she played with the Segeltorps IF in the Riksserien (Sweden league elite).

== Awards and honors ==
- Best players of each team selection (as voted by coaches), 2011 IIHF Women's World Championship
