= Ylva Lindberg =

Swedish ice hockey player

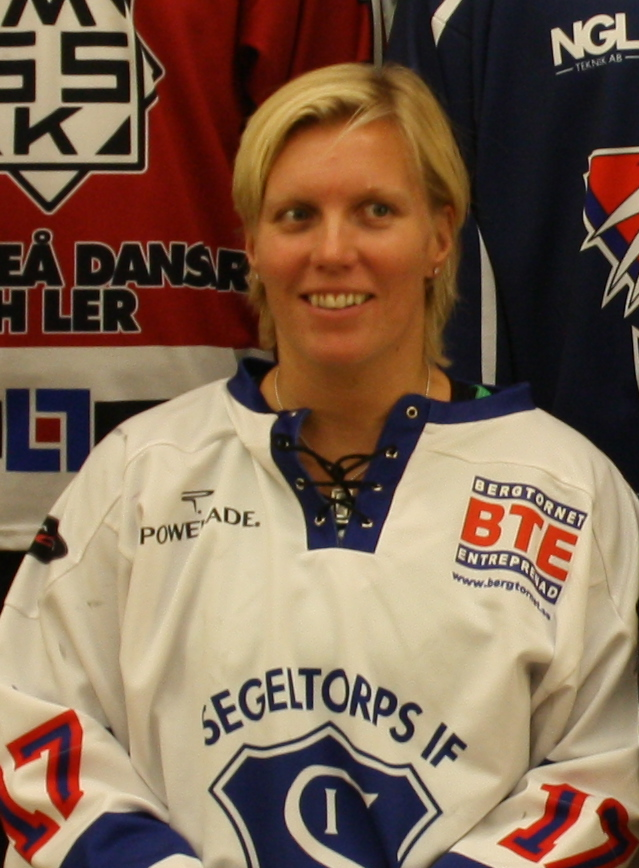
- Born: 29 June 1976 (age 50) Umeå, Sweden
- Height: 1.65 m (5 ft 5 in)
- Weight: 58 kg (128 lb; 9 st 2 lb)
- Position: Defence
- Shot: Left
- Played for: MB Hockey; Segeltorps IF
- National team: Sweden
- Playing career: 1993–2010
Medal record
Women's ice hockey
Representing Sweden
Olympics
Silver medal – second place	2006 Turin	Team
Bronze medal – third place	2002 Salt Lake City	Team
World Championships
Bronze medal – third place	2005 Sweden

Ylva Lindberg (née Martinsen; born 29 June 1976) is a Swedish retired ice hockey player and, as of the 2021–22 season, an assistant coach to the Norwegian women's national ice hockey team. She won a silver medal at the 2006 Winter Olympics and a bronze medal at the 2002 Winter Olympics.

== Personal life ==
Lindberg came out as lesbian in 2006, along with fellow hockey player Erika Holst.
