= Antti Laaksonen =

Finnish ice hockey player

- Born: October 3, 1973 (age 52) Tammela, Finland
- Height: 6 ft 0 in (183 cm)
- Weight: 187 lb (85 kg; 13 st 5 lb)
- Position: Left wing
- Shot: Left
- Played for: HPK; Boston Bruins; Minnesota Wild; Colorado Avalanche; HC Fribourg-Gottéron; Lukko
- National team: Finland
- NHL draft: 191st overall, 1997; Boston Bruins
- Playing career: 1993–2010

Antti Akseli Laaksonen (born October 3, 1973) is a Finnish former professional ice hockey left winger who last played for the Lukko of the SM-Liiga. Antti had a seven-year NHL career, mostly as a third line wing and penalty killer for the Boston Bruins, Minnesota Wild and Colorado Avalanche.

== Playing career ==
Laaksonen left Finland for North America in 1993 as a junior pro from the SM-Liiga. He enrolled at the University of Denver where he played four seasons for the Pioneers. Laaksonen was selected 191st overall by the Boston Bruins in the 1997 NHL entry draft. In 1997–98, Laaksonen made his professional debut in North America, playing with both the Charlotte Checkers of the ECHL and the Bruins affiliate, the Providence Bruins.

Laaksonen made his NHL debut with the Bruins at the start of the 1998–99 season, playing in 11 games before he was sent down to Providence where he helped the Bruins capture the Calder Cup. Unable to become a regular with the Bruins by the end of the 1999–2000 season Laaskonen left the Bruins as a free agent.

On July 14, 2000, Laaksonen signed with the Minnesota Wild for their inaugural season. Antti became a fixture in the Wild offense resulting in four seasons with the Wild.

On July 2, 2004, Laaksonen was signed as a free agent by the Colorado Avalanche to a two-year contract. With the 2004–05 NHL lockout, Laaksonen played his first game with the Avalanche in their season opener for the 2005–06 season. Laaksonen established career highs with the Avalanche, scoring 16 goals and 34 points. On June 28, 2006, the Avalanche exercised their option for the 2006–07 season. During the season, however, a poor run of form led Laaksonen to be demoted to the Avalanche's affiliate, the Albany River Rats of the AHL.

At season's end, Laaksonen left North America and signed with Swiss team HC Fribourg-Gottéron of the NLA on June 18, 2007. After only one season with Gottéron he returned to his native Finland and signed with Lukko of the SM-Liiga. In his second season with Lukko, Laaksonen captained the team in its return to the post-season before retiring and settling in Minnesota, where he enjoyed the majority of his NHL success.

== Career statistics ==
=== Regular season and playoffs ===
			Regular season					Playoffs
Season	Team	League	GP	G	A	Pts	PIM	GP	G	A	Pts	PIM
1990–91	FoPS	FIN.2	2	0	0	0	0	—	—	—	—	—
1991–92	FoPS	FIN.2	41	16	15	31	8	—	—	—	—	—
1992–93	FoPS	FIN U20	9	5	3	8	10	—	—	—	—	—
1992–93	FoPS	FIN.2	34	11	19	30	36	—	—	—	—	—
1992–93	HPK	FIN U20	1	1	1	2	0	—	—	—	—	—
1992–93	HPK	SM-l	2	0	0	0	0	—	—	—	—	—
1993–94	University of Denver	WCHA	36	12	9	21	38	—	—	—	—	—
1994–95	University of Denver	WCHA	40	17	18	35	42	—	—	—	—	—
1995–96	University of Denver	WCHA	38	25	28	53	71	—	—	—	—	—
1996–97	University of Denver	WCHA	39	21	17	38	63	—	—	—	—	—
1997–98	Charlotte Checkers	ECHL	15	4	3	7	12	6	0	3	3	0
1997–98	Providence Bruins	AHL	38	3	2	5	14	—	—	—	—	—
1998–99	Boston Bruins	NHL	11	1	2	3	2	—	—	—	—	—
1998–99	Providence Bruins	AHL	66	25	33	58	52	19	7	2	9	28
1999–2000	Boston Bruins	NHL	27	6	3	9	2	—	—	—	—	—
1999–2000	Providence Bruins	AHL	40	10	12	22	57	14	5	4	9	4
2000–01	Minnesota Wild	NHL	82	12	16	28	24	—	—	—	—	—
2001–02	Minnesota Wild	NHL	82	16	17	33	22	—	—	—	—	—
2002–03	Minnesota Wild	NHL	82	15	16	31	26	16	1	3	4	4
2003–04	Minnesota Wild	NHL	77	12	14	26	20	—	—	—	—	—
2005–06	Colorado Avalanche	NHL	81	16	18	34	40	9	0	2	2	2
2006–07	Colorado Avalanche	NHL	41	3	1	4	16	—	—	—	—	—
2006–07	Albany River Rats	AHL	24	9	7	16	4	1	0	0	0	0
2007–08	HC Fribourg–Gottéron	NLA	46	12	13	25	44	6	1	0	1	14
2008–09	Lukko	SM-l	51	17	23	40	66	—	—	—	—	—
2009–10	Lukko	SM-l	47	9	14	23	46	4	0	1	1	4
NHL totals			483	81	87	168	152	25	1	5	6	6

=== International ===
Medal record

Representing Finland

Ice hockey

Winter Olympics
Silver medal – second place	2006 Turin	

World Cup
Silver medal – second place	2004 Canada	

World Championships
Silver medal – second place	2001 Hanover	

Year	Team	Event	Result	GP	G	A	Pts	PIM
1993	Finland	WJC	5th	7	2	0	2	2
2001	Finland	WC	2nd place, silver medalist(s)	9	2	4	6	8
2004	Finland	WC	6th	7	1	2	3	2
2004	Finland	WCH	2nd place, silver medalist(s)	1	0	0	0	0
2006	Finland	OG	2nd place, silver medalist(s)	8	0	0	0	6
Junior totals				7	2	0	2	2
Senior totals				25	3	6	9	16

== Awards and honors ==
Award	Year
All-WCHA Second team	1995–96
AHL Calder Cup (Providence Bruins)	1998–99
