= Courtney Kennedy =

American ice hockey player

Personal information
- Born: March 29, 1979 (age 47) Woburn, Massachusetts, U.S.
Medal record
Women's ice hockey
Representing United States
Olympic Games
Silver medal – second place	2002 Salt Lake City	Tournament
Bronze medal – third place	2006 Turin	Tournament
IIHF World Women's Championships
Gold medal – first place	2005 Sweden	Tournament

Courtney Kennedy (born March 29, 1979) is an American ice hockey player and coach. As a player, she won a silver medal at the 2002 Winter Olympics, a bronze medal at the 2006 Winter Olympics, and a gold medal at the IIHF Women's World Championship in 2005. She is the current head coach at Merrimack College for the women's hockey team.

Kennedy was born in Woburn, Massachusetts. She played college hockey at Colby College before transferring to the University of Minnesota along with her sister Shannon. At University of Minnesota she won a national championship in 200 and was named the Western Collegiate Hockey Association (WCHA) Player of the Year and Defensive Player of the Year in 2001. In 2008, Kennedy was inducted into the University of Minnesota M Club Hall of Fame. She graduated in 2001 with a bachelor’s degree in youth studies.

She was the head coach of the Buckingham Browne & Nichols girls' varsity ice hockey team from 2004-2007. She was the assistant head coach of the Boston College Eagles women's ice hockey team from 2007-2012 and associate head coach from 2012-2024. She won a gold medal as the head coach for the U18 USA Women's National Team at the 2026 IIHF Women's World Championship, a silver medal as the assistant coach for U18 US National Team in 2025, two gold medals as an assistant coach for the U18 USA National Team (2017, 2018), and two silver medals as an assistant coach of the USA National Team (2021) and Olympic National Team (2021-22). She was the skills coach for the PWHL's Boston Fleet for the 2024 to 2025 season. She was awarded the AHCA Women’s Ice Hockey Assistant Coach Award.

Kennedy is on the executive board of USA Hockey. She is also the director of on-ice practices for the East Coast Wizard Girls Youth Hockey Program, USA Hockey Select Festival coach and director of the Kennedy School of Hockey.
