= Tricia Dunn-Luoma =

American ice hockey player (born 1974)

- Born: April 25, 1974 (age 52) Derry, NH, USA
- Height: 5 ft 8 in (173 cm)
- Weight: 146 lb (66 kg; 10 st 6 lb)
- Position: Forward
- Hockey East WWHL team: New Hampshire Wildcats; Minnesota Whitecaps
- National team: United States
- Playing career: 1996–2006
Medal record
Representing United States
Women's ice hockey
Olympic Games
Gold medal – first place	1998 Nagano	Tournament
Silver medal – second place	2002 Salt Lake City	Tournament
Bronze medal – third place	2006 Turin	Tournament
IIHF World Women's Championships
Silver medal – second place	1997 Canada	Tournament
Silver medal – second place	1999 Finland	Tournament
Silver medal – second place	2000 Canada	Tournament
Silver medal – second place	2001 United States	Tournament
Silver medal – second place	2004 Canada	Tournament

Patricia A. Dunn-Luoma (born April 25, 1974) is an American ice hockey player. She won a gold medal at the 1998 Winter Olympics, silver medal at the 2002 Winter Olympics and a bronze medal at the 2006 Winter Olympics. She graduated from Pinkerton Academy in Derry, and the University of New Hampshire in 1996.

== See also ==
- New Hampshire Historical Marker No. 266: Pinkerton Academy / Old Academy Building
