= Anna Vikman =

Swedish ice hockey player

- Born: January 13, 1981 (age 45) Överkalix, Sweden
- Height: 5 ft 6 in (168 cm)
- Weight: 159 lb (72 kg; 11 st 5 lb)
- Position: Centre
- Shot: Left
- Played for: Modo Hockey
- National team: Sweden
- Playing career: 1998–2009
Medal record
Women's ice hockey
Representing Sweden
Olympic Games
Silver medal – second place	2006 Turin	Team
Bronze medal – third place	2002 Salt Lake City	Team
World Championships
Bronze medal – third place	2005 Sweden

Ingrid Anna Kristina Vikman (born January 13, 1981) is an ice hockey forward from Sweden. She won a silver medal at the 2006 Winter Olympics and a bronze medal at the 2002 Winter Olympics.
