= Jenni Asserholt =

Swedish ice hockey player (born 1988)

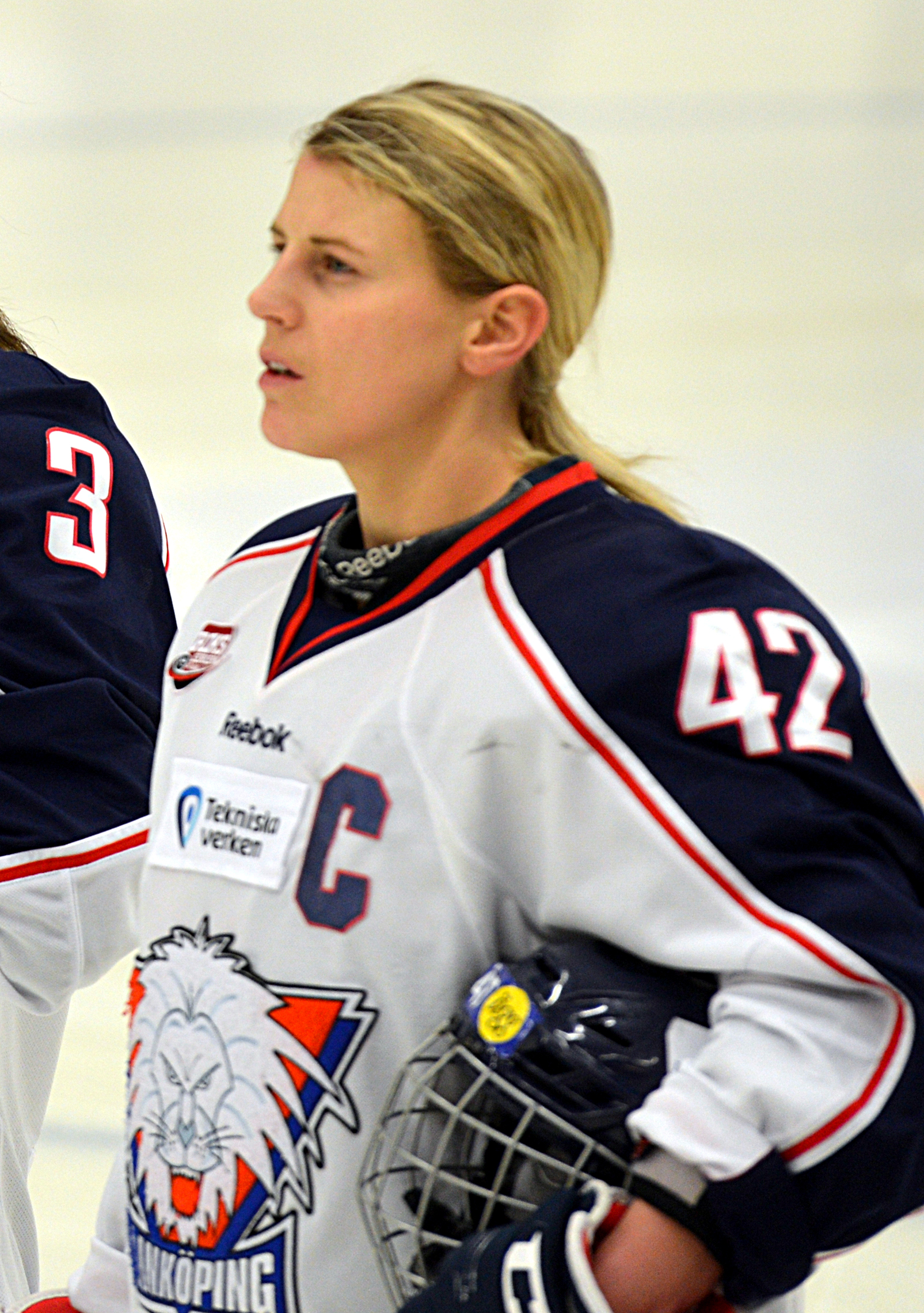
- Born: 8 April 1988 (age 38) Örebro, Sweden
- Height: 172 cm (5 ft 8 in)
- Weight: 71 kg (157 lb; 11 st 3 lb)
- Position: Forward
- Shot: Left
- Played for: HV71; Linköping HC
- National team: Sweden
- Playing career: 2005–2019
Medal record
Women's ice hockey
Representing Sweden
Olympic Games
Silver medal – second place	2006 Turin	Team
World Championships
Bronze medal – third place	2005 Sweden
Bronze medal – third place	2007 Canada

Jenni Anna Christina Asserholt (born 8 April 1988) is a Swedish retired ice hockey player and current team physical therapist to HV71 Dam of the Swedish Women's Hockey League (SDHL). She played as a forward with HV71 Dam and Linköping HC Dam in the SDHL and with the Swedish women's national ice hockey team. She won a silver medal at the 2006 Winter Olympics.

In 2004 Jenni underwent treatment for her asthma, even though she doesn't experience any asthmatic symptoms as of 2011. She has said that the cold temperatures in ice hockey rinks cause breathing difficulties during her younger years.
