= Therese Sjölander =

Swedish ice hockey player

- Born: May 4, 1981 (age 45) Sollefteå, SWE
- Height: 5 ft 8 in (173 cm)
- Weight: 157 lb (71 kg; 11 st 3 lb)
- Position: Forward
- Shot: Left
- Played for: Modo Hockey; Järveds IF
- National team: Sweden
- Playing career: 1997–2011
Medal record
Women's ice hockey
Representing Sweden
Olympic Games
Silver medal – second place	2006 Turin	Team
Bronze medal – third place	2002 Salt Lake City	Team
World Championships
Bronze medal – third place	2005 Sweden

Eva Therése Sjölander (born 4 May 1981 in Sollefteå, Sweden) is an ice hockey player from Sweden. She won a silver medal at the 2006 Winter Olympics and a bronze medal at the 2002 Winter Olympics.
