= Nanna Jansson =

Swedish ice hockey player

Medal record

Women's ice hockey

Representing Sweden

Olympic Games
Silver medal – second place	2006 Turin	Team
Bronze medal – third place	2002 Salt Lake City	Team

World Championships
Bronze medal – third place	2005 Sweden	
Bronze medal – third place	2007 Canada	

Nanna Kristina Jansson (born July 7, 1983 in Gävle, Sweden) is an ice hockey player from Sweden. She won a silver medal at the 2006 Winter Olympics and a bronze medal at the 2002 Winter Olympics.
