= Jenny Lindqvist =

Swedish ice hockey player

- Born: July 21, 1978 (age 46); Stockholm, SWE
- Height: 5 ft 6 in (168 cm)
- Weight: 143 lb (65 kg; 10 st 3 lb)
- Position: Forward
- Shot: Left
- Played for: M/B Hockey; Segeltorps IK
- National team: Sweden
- Playing career: 1998–2010

Olympic medal record

Women's ice hockey
Silver medal – second place	2006 Turin	Team

Jenny Elisabeth Lindqvist (born July 21, 1978 in Stockholm, Sweden) is a Swedish ice hockey player. She won a silver medal at the 2006 Winter Olympics.
