= Jamie Hagerman =

American ice hockey player

- Born: May 7, 1981 (age 45) North Andover, Massachusetts, U.S.
- Height: 5 ft 9 in (175 cm)
- Weight: 170 lb (77 kg; 12 st 2 lb)
- Position: Defense
- Shot: Right
- National team: United States
- Playing career: 1999–2006
Medal record
Representing United States
Women's ice hockey
Olympic Games
| Bronze medal – third place | 2006 Turin | Tournament |
IIHF World Women's Championships
| Gold medal – first place | 2005 Sweden | Tournament |

Jamison Patten Phinney (born May 7, 1981 in North Andover, Massachusetts and raised in Wenham, Massachusetts) is an American ice hockey player. She won a bronze medal at the 2006 Winter Olympics.

== Playing career ==
=== Harvard Crimson ===
She played for the Harvard Crimson women's ice hockey program from 1999–2003. In those four years, she missed only one game. She was the team captain in her junior year. In her senior year, the Harvard defense allowed 1.47 goals per game, the lowest in the NCAA. In 2004, she would become an assistant coach for the Crimson.

=== USA Hockey ===
Her first experience with USA Hockey was winning a Gold Medal at the 2003 Four Nations Cup. Jamie Phinney won a gold medal with Team USA at the 2005 IIHF Women's Ice Hockey championships. She registered one assist and a plus-minus rating of plus-5. In addition, she participated at the 2005 Four Nations Cup in Finland and won a silver medal. She led all USA players with a plus-minus rating of plus-8. Phinney has participated in six USA Hockey National Women's Festivals (the first in 1998, the others from 2000–05).

== Career stats ==
| Year | Games Played | Goals | Assists | Points | Penalty Minutes |
| 2001–02 (Harvard) | 31 | 4 | 19 | 23 | 34 |

== Awards and honors ==
- Harvard's John Dooley Award

== See also ==
- World Fit
