= Joa Elfsberg =

Swedish ice hockey player (born 1979)

- Born: 30 July 1979 (age 47) Valbo, Gästrikland, Sweden
- Height: 1.77 m (5 ft 10 in)
- Weight: 73 kg (161 lb; 11 st 7 lb)
- Position: Forward
- Shot: Right
- Played for: Brynäs IF
- National team: Sweden
- Playing career: 1995–2011
Medal record
Women's ice hockey
Representing Sweden
Olympic Games
Silver medal – second place	2006 Turin	Team competition
Bronze medal – third place	2002 Salt Lake City	Team competition
World Championships
Bronze medal – third place	2007 Canada

Joa Elfsberg (born 30 July 1979) is a Swedish retired ice hockey player. With the Swedish national team, she won a silver medal at the 2006 Winter Olympics and a bronze medal at the 2002 Winter Olympics.
