= Kim Insalaco =

American ice hockey player (born 1980)

- Born: November 4, 1980 (age 45) Rochester, NY, USA
- Height: 5 ft 5 in (165 cm)
- Weight: 130 lb (59 kg; 9 st 4 lb)
- Position: Forward
- ECAC NWHL team: Brown Bears; Oakville Ice
- National team: United States
- Playing career: 1999–2008
Medal record
Representing United States
Women's ice hockey
Olympic Games
Bronze medal – third place	2006 Turin	Tournament
IIHF World Women's Championships
Gold medal – first place	2005 Sweden	Tournament
Silver medal – second place	2004 Canada	Tournament

Kimberly Michelle Insalaco (born November 4, 1980) is an American ice hockey player. She won a bronze medal at the 2006 Winter Olympics. She graduated from Brown University in 2003.

== Before Brown ==
Insalaco was educated at Choate Rosemary Hall in Wallingford, Connecticut, where in 1999 she was and played for the Connecticut Polar Bears. She was the 1999 New England Prep School Player of the Year, Boston Globe All-Scholastic Selection, Hockey Night in Boston Most Valuable Forward, and Hockey Night in Boston All-Scholastic Tournament MVP. She was an All-State Soccer Award winner and an All-New England Soccer Team MVP in 1999. Kim is a 3-time New England Champion with the Choate Varsity Track and Field, Soccer, and Ice Hockey teams. Kim set and still holds the ice hockey single-season goal-scoring record at Choate, with 51 goals, during the 1997-98 regular season.

== At Brown ==
Kim played for the Brown University Bears from 1999 to 2003 and was an extremely important factor in Brown's success during those years. She played in one AWCHA National Championship and one NCAA National Frozen Four Final finishing as a runner-up to Minn.-Duluth.

In her freshman season, she was the leading scorer for underclassmen tallying 20 goals and 17 assists, for 37 points. She was named to the First Team All-Ivy Selection and was also a member of the Brown Women's Soccer Team all 4-years.

In her junior year, Kim tallied 24 goals and 26 assists for a 50-point total, ranking third in scoring for the NCAA that season. She was also a co-captain. She scored the game-winning goal in the ECAC Championship and the NCAA Semi-Final match-up against Minnesota.

In her senior year, Kim tallied 9 goals and 23 assists for a 32-point total. She also earned ECAC All-Academic Honors. After her career at Brown, she competed for the Oakville Ice of the National Women's Hockey League.

== Team USA ==
Kim attended U.S Junior National camps from 1994 to 1998 and attended the USA Hockey National Women's Festival for the first time in 1998. She was a member of the USA Under-22 National Team from 1996 to 2002. Kim played for the USA National Team at the Women's World Championship in 2003–2004, and 2004–2005, winning Gold in 2004–2005. In 2005, she again skated for Team USA at the Four Nations Cup in Finland. In 2006, Kim was named to the USA Olympic Team, which won Bronze at the 2006 Olympics in Turin, Italy.
