= Frida Nevalainen =

Swedish ice hockey player

- Born: January 27, 1987 (age 39) Umeå, SWE
- Height: 5 ft 5 in (165 cm)
- Weight: 143 lb (65 kg; 10 st 3 lb)
- Position: Defence
- Shot: Left
- Played for: IF Björklöven; Modo Hockey; Segeltorps IF
- National team: Sweden
- Playing career: 2001–2013
Medal record
Women's ice hockey
Representing Sweden
Olympic Games
Silver medal – second place	2006 Turin	Team
World Championships
Bronze medal – third place	2005 Sweden
Bronze medal – third place	2007 Canada

Frida Margareta Nevalainen (born 27 January 1987 in Umeå, Sweden) is an ice hockey player. Nevalainen is a defenceman for the Sweden women's national ice hockey team. She won a silver medal at the 2006 Winter Olympics. (In Swedish)

Her twin brother Patrik also played professional ice hockey, playing in the SM-liiga with Lukko and the Elitserien for Timrå IK.

Nevalainen was the second woman of all time to participate in the TV-pucken tournament, and the first to do so representing the province of Västerbotten.

She has also played for Tornado Moscow Region, a Russian team. Originally representing IF Björklöven she later transferred to Modo Hockey in the Riksserien (Sweden league elite). She played for the University of Windsor in the 2007–08 season.
