= Ann-Louise Edstrand =

Swedish ice hockey player (born 1975)

Medal record

Representing Sweden

Women's ice hockey

Olympic Games
Silver medal – second place	2006 Turin	Team competition
Bronze medal – third place	2002 Salt Lake City	Team competition

World Championships
Bronze medal – third place	2005 Sweden	
Bronze medal – third place	2007 Canada	

Ann-Louise Carina Edstrand (born April 25, 1975, in Örnsköldsvik, Sweden) is an ice hockey player from Sweden. She won a silver medal at the 2006 Winter Olympics and a bronze medal at the 2002 Winter Olympics. In 2016, she was elected to the Swedish Hockey Hall of Fame.
