= Emilie O'Konor =

Swedish ice hockey player

- Born: 21 February 1983 (age 43) Stockholm, Sweden
- Height: 169 cm (5 ft 7 in)
- Weight: 63 kg (139 lb; 9 st 13 lb)
- Position: Centre
- Shot: Left
- Played for: Djurgårdens IF; SDE HF; AIK IF
- National team: Sweden
- Playing career: 2003–2016
Medal record
Women's ice hockey
Representing Sweden
Olympic Games
Silver medal – second place	2006 Turin	Tournament
World Championship
Bronze medal – third place	2005 Sweden

Emilie Louise O'Konor (born 21 February 1983) is a Swedish retired ice hockey player. She won a silver medal with the Swedish national team in the women's ice hockey tournament at the 2006 Winter Olympics.
