= Katarina Timglas =

Swedish ice hockey player

- Born: 24 November 1985 (age 40) Malmö, SWE
- Height: 5 ft 6 in (168 cm)
- Weight: 137 lb (62 kg; 9 st 11 lb)
- Position: Forward
- Shot: Right
- Played for: Limhamn HK; AIK IF
- National team: Sweden
- Playing career: 2001–2010
Medal record
Women's ice hockey
Representing Sweden
Olympic Games
Silver medal – second place	2006 Turin	Team
World Championships
Bronze medal – third place	2005 Sweden
Bronze medal – third place	2007 Canada

Anna Katarina Timglas (born 24 November 1985 in Malmö, Sweden) was a Swedish ice hockey player. She won a silver medal at the 2006 Winter Olympics. She has been an ice hockey referee since 2012.
