= Cecilia Andersson =

Swedish ice hockey player

- Born: October 4, 1982 (age 44) Stockholm, Sweden
- Height: 5 ft 10 in (178 cm)
- Weight: 163 lb (74 kg; 11 st 9 lb)
- Position: Goaltender
- Caught: Left
- Played for: Montreal Stars; Concordia Stingers
- National team: Sweden
- Playing career: 2003–2008
Medal record
Women's ice hockey
Representing Sweden
Olympic Games
Silver medal – second place	2006 Turin	Team
World Championships
Bronze medal – third place	2005 Sweden

Cecilia Christine Elisabeth Andersson (born October 4, 1982) is a Swedish retired ice hockey goaltender. She represented Sweden in the women's ice hockey tournament at the 2006 Winter Olympics and in the 2005 IIHF Women's World Championship.

== Career statistics ==
=== International ===
Year	Team	Event	Result	GP	W	L	T/OT	MIN	GA	SO	GAA	SV%
2006	Sweden	OG	2nd place, silver medalist(s)	2	1	1	0	120:00	8	1	4.00	0.843
