= Kristina Lundberg =

Swedish ice hockey player

- Born: June 10, 1985 (age 41) Husum, SWE
- Height: 5 ft 8 in (173 cm)
- Weight: 187 lb (85 kg; 13 st 5 lb)
- Position: Forward
- Shot: Left
- Played for: Modo Hockey; Skellefteå AIK; Segeltorps IK; Munksund-Skuthamns SK
- National team: Sweden
- Playing career: 2001–2011
Medal record
Women's ice hockey
Representing Sweden
Olympic Games
Silver medal – second place	2006 Turin	Team
World Championships
Bronze medal – third place	2005 Sweden

Kristina Anna Maria Lundberg (born 10 June 1985) is a Swedish ice hockey player. She was born in Husum, and won a silver medal at the 2006 Winter Olympics.
