= Segeltorps IF =

Swedish football club

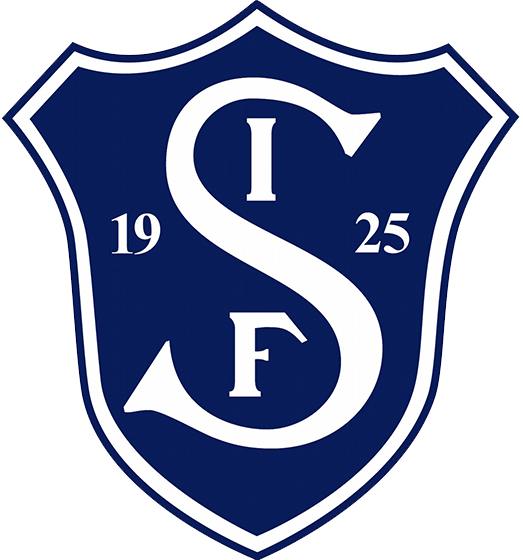
- Full name: Segeltorps Idrottsföreningen
- Founded: 1925
- Ground: Segeltorps IP; Kungens Kurva; Sweden
- Chairman: Stefan Halldén
- League: Division 3 Stockholm Södra
Home colours

Segeltorps IF is a Swedish football club located in Kungens Kurva.

== Background ==
Segeltorps Idrottsföreningen is a sports club in Kungens Kurva in Huddinge Municipality in Metropolitan Stockholm. The club is well known for its women's ice-hockey team which won the Swedish Championships in 2008, 2010 and 2011.

The men's football team currently plays in Division 3 Stockholm Södra which is the Fifth tier of Swedish football. They play their home matches at the Segeltorps IP in Kungens Kurva.

The club is affiliated to Stockholms Fotbollförbund.

== Current squad ==
Note: Flags indicate national team as defined under FIFA eligibility rules; some limited exceptions apply. Players may hold more than one non-FIFA nationality.

No.	Pos.	Nation	Player
—		SWE	Rinor Nushi

== Season to season ==
Season	Level	Division	Section	Position	Movements
2004	Tier 5	Division 4	Stockholm Södra	2nd	Promotion Playoffs – Promoted
2005	Tier 4	Division 3	Norra Svealand	8th	
2006	Tier 5	Division 3	Östra Svealand	5th	
2007	Tier 5	Division 3	Östra Svealand	11th	Relegated
2008	Tier 6	Division 4	Stockholm Södra	6th	
2009	Tier 6	Division 4	Stockholm Södra	6th	
2010	Tier 6	Division 4	Stockholm Södra	5th	
2011	Tier 6	Division 4	Stockholm Södra	3rd	
2012	Tier 6	Division 4	Stockholm Södra	4th	
2013	Tier 6	Division 4	Stockholm Södra	2nd	Promotion Playoffs – Promoted

* League restructuring in 2006 resulted in a new division being created at Tier 3 and subsequent divisions dropping a level.
