= 2009–10 CHA women's ice hockey season =

2009–10 College Hockey America women's ice hockey season
- League: NCAA Division I
- Sport: Ice hockey
- Duration: September 2009 through March, 2010

Regular Season
- Champion: Mercyhurst Lakers
- Runners-Up: Syracuse Orange
- Season MVP: Vicki Bendus
- Top scorer: Vicki Bendus

Tournament
- Champions: Mercyhurst Lakers
- Runners-up: Syracuse Orange
- Finals MVP: Ashley Cockell

Ice hockey seasons
- 08–09 10–11

The 2009–10 College Hockey America women's ice hockey season marked the continuation of the annual tradition of competitive ice hockey among College Hockey America members.

== Preseason ==
=== College Hockey America Preseason Coaches’ Poll ===
Place	School	First Place Votes	Total Points
1	Mercyhurst	(4)	16
2	Robert Morris	(0)	12
3	Wayne State	(1)	9
4	Syracuse	(0)	8
5	Niagara	(0)	5

=== Pre-Season All-CHA Team ===
Position	Name	School	Class
F	Vicki Bendus	Mercyhurst	Jr.
F	Jesse Scanzano	Mercyhurst	Jr.
F	Brianna Delaney	Robert Morris (tie)	So.
F	Bailey Bram	Mercyhurst (tie)	So
D	Ashley Cockell	Mercyhurst	Jr
D	Chelsea Burnett	Wayne State(tie)	Sr
D	Melissa Lacroix	Mercyhurst (tie)	Jr
G	Hillary Pattenden	Mercyhurst (tie)	So
G	Lucy Schoedel	Syracuse (tie)	Jr.

- Player of the Year, Jesse Scanzano, Mercyhurst College

=== CIS Exhibition ===
Date	Location	NCAA school	CIS team	Score
Fri. Sept 25	Detroit	Wayne State	York	Wayne State, 3-2
Sat. Sept 26	Erie, Pa.	Mercyhurst	Guelph	Mercyhurst, 10-0
Sun, Sep 27	Pittsburgh, Pa.	Robert Morris	Wilfrid Laurier	RMU, 4-0
Sun. Sept 27	Tennity Ice Pavilion	Syracuse	Guelph	Guelph, 3-1

=== Canadian semipro exhibition ===
Date	Location	NCAA school	Canadian team	Score
9/25/2009	Erie, Pa.	Mercyhurst	Vaughan Flames	Mercyhurst, 10-0

== Regular season ==
=== Standings ===
2009–10 College Hockey America standings
	Overall							Conference					
	GP	W	L	T	PTS	GF	GA	GP	W	L	T	GF	GA
x, y: Mercyhurst	23	19	1	3	41	0	0	7	6	0	1	0	0
Syracuse	26	13	12	1	27	0	0	8	4	4	0	0	0
Wayne State	22	8	11	3	19	0	0	8	4	4	0	0	0
Niagara	22	8	10	4	20	0	0	8	3	3	2	0	0
Robert Morris	25	7	17	1	15	0	0	7	0	6	1	0	0

x: Regular season champion, y: Postseason champion

=== October ===
- October 31: No. 1 ranked Mercyhurst College suffered its first loss of the season. Fifth-ranked Minnesota Duluth skated away to a 4–3 win and a split of the two-game series at the Mercyhurst Ice Center. With the loss, the Lakers fall to 7–1 on the season.

=== November ===
- November 13: On Nov. 14, the Niagara Purple Eagles will don pink jerseys in an effort to help Pink the Rink in the annual CHA's initiative Skate for the Cure game for breast health awareness.

=== December ===
- December 6: The Robert Morris vs. Mercyhurst game on Sunday, December 6 at 1:00 p.m. has been postponed due to a water main break at the Mercyhurst Ice Center. The game is rescheduled for Tuesday, February 2 at 7:00 p.m.
- December 12: Jesse Scanzano scored three goals in the third period to lead the top-ranked Mercyhurst College women's hockey team over No. 10 St. Lawrence, 6–2.
- December 17: Former Robert Morris Colonials goaltender Brianne McLaughlin was selected as one of three goalies to the 2010 U.S. Olympic Women's Ice Hockey Team. McLaughlin is the first-ever Colonial to compete in the Olympic Games.

=== January ===
- January 27: The Mercyhurst Lakers (19-1-3, 6-0-1 College Hockey America) head the USA TODAY/USA Hockey Magazine poll for the 14th week and are the unanimous choice with all 19 first-place votes for the eighth time. Their only loss came in an October home split with Minnesota-Duluth, which is ranked fourth this week.
- January 30: Wayne State University's women's hockey program officially celebrates its 10th anniversary on January 30–31. At the City Sports Center, the 2009-10 Warriors (8-11-3, 4-4-0 CHA) will host the Syracuse Orange (13-12-1, 4-4-0 CHA) in a College Hockey America series.
- January 30: Niagara became only the second team all year, and the first in the CHA team to defeat Mercyhurst. The Purple Eagles defeated the Lakers 2–1. Jenni Bauer stopped 44 of 45 shots, including all 19 fired her way in the second period in what was a scoreless game until the 42nd minute. The victory was the first-ever for the Purple Eagles over a top-ranked team and their first over the Lakers since 2004. The result snapped Mercyhurst's nation-leading 16-game unbeaten streak and 26-game CHA unbeaten run.

== 2010 Olympics ==
The following former CHA players will represent their respective countries in Ice hockey at the 2010 Winter Olympics.

Player	NCAA school	Nationality	Position	Goals	Assists	Points	Medal
Meghan Agosta	Mercyhurst	Canada	Forward	9	6	15	Gold
Brianne McLaughlin	Robert Morris Colonials	United States	Goaltender	0	0	0	Silver
Stefanie Marty	Syracuse	Switzerland	Forward				5th

== In season honors ==
=== Players of the week ===
Throughout the conference regular season, College Hockey America offices names a player of the week each Monday.

Week	Player of the week
10/05/09	Vicki Bendus, Mercyhurst
10/12/09	Stefany Marty, Syracuse
10/19/09	Katrina Protopapas, Wayne State
10/26/09	Bailey Bram, Mercyhurst
11/2/09	No award given
11/9/09	Jesse Scanzano, Mercyhurst
11/16/09	Brianna Delaney, Robert Morris
11/23/09	Kelley Steadman, Mercyhurst
11/30/09	Vicki Bendus, Mercyhurst
12/7/09	Bailey Bram, Mercyhurst
12/14/09	Stefanie Marty, Syracuse
12/21/09	No award given
12/28/08	No award given
1/4/10	Vicki Bendus, Mercyhurst
1/11/10	Katrina Protopapas, Wayne State
1/18/10	Vicki Bendus, Mercyhurst
1/25/10	Sara O'Malley, Robert Morris
2/1/10	Julie Rising, Syracuse
2/8/10	Bailey Bram, Mercyhurst
2/15/10	Daniela Del Colle, Niagara
2/22/10	Kelley Steadman, Mercyhurst
3/1/10	Jess Jones, Mercyhurst
3/8/10	

=== Defensive players of the week ===
Week	Def. Player of the week
10/05/09	Daneca Butterfield, Robert Morris
10/12/09	Jacki Gibson, Robert Morris
10/19/09	Hillary Pattenden, Mercyhurst
10/26/09	Daneca Butterfield, Robert Morris
11/2/09	No award given
11/9/09	Daneca Butterfield, Robert Morris
11/16/09	Jenni Bauer, Niagara
11/23/09	Lucy Schoedel, Syracuse
11/30/09	Jenni Bauer, Niagara
12/7/09	Chelsea Burnett, Wayne State
12/14/09	Lucy Schoedel, Syracuse
12/21/09	No award given
12/28/08	No award given
1/4/10	Hillary Pattenden, Mercyhurst
1/11/10	Jill Szandzik, Wayne State
1/18/10	Delayne Brian, Wayne State
1/25/10	Hillary Pattenden, Mercyhurst
2/1/10	Jenni Bauer, Niagara
2/8/10	Melissa Lacroix, Mercyhurst
2/15/10	Gabrielle Beaudry, Syracuse
2/22/10	Hillary Pattenden, Mercyhurst
3/1/10	Chelsea Burnett, Wayne State
3/8/10	

=== Rookies of the week ===
Throughout the conference regular season, College Hockey America offices names a rookie of the week each Monday.

Week	Player of the week
10/05/09	Jenna Hendrikx, Niagara
10/12/09	Isabel Menard, Syracuse
10/19/09	Isabel Menard, Syracuse
10/26/09	Jenna Hendrikx, Niagara
11/2/09	No award given
11/9/09	Jennifer Kindret, Robert Morris
11/16/09	Gina Buquet, Wayne State
11/23/09	Isabel Menard, Syracuse
11/30/09	Erin Burns, Syracuse
12/7/09	Isabel Menard, Syracuse
12/14/09	Lauren Jones, Mercyhurst
12/21/09	No award given
12/28/08	No award given
1/4/10	Lauren Jones, Mercyhurst
1/11/10	Holly Carrie-Mattimoe, Syracuse
1/18/10	Julie Ingratta, Wayne State
1/25/10	Jennifer Kindret, Robert Morris
2/1/10	
2/8/10	Isabel Menard, Syracuse
2/15/10	
2/22/10	
3/1/10	
3/8/10	

== Statistical leaders ==
=== Skaters ===
- As of February 10

Goals
Name	School	Goals
Bailey Bram	Mercyhurst	27
Vicki Bendus	Mercyhurst	27
Jess Jones	Mercyhurst	20
Jesse Scanzano	Mercyhurst	19
Ashley Cockell	Mercyhurst	19

Assists
Name	School	Assists
Jesse Scanzano	Mercyhurst	41
Vicki Bendus	Mercyhurst	35
Bailey Bram	Mercyhurst	26
Jess Jones	Mercyhurst	25

Points
Name	School	Points
Vicki Bendus	Mercyhurst	62
Jesse Scanzano	Mercyhurst	60
Bailey Bram	Mercyhurst	53
Jess Jones	Mercyhurst	45
Ashley Cockell	Mercyhurst	40

Power Play Goals
Name	School	PPG
Bailey Bram	Mercyhurst	12
Katrina Protopapas	Wayne State	9
Vicki Bendus	Mercyhurst	8
Brianna Delaney	Robert Morris	6
Jesse Scanzano	Mercyhurst	6

=== Goaltenders ===
- As of February 10

Goals Against
Name	School	GAA
Hillary Pattenden	Mercyhurst	1.73
Delayne Brian	Wayne State	2.08
Jenni Bauer	Niagara	2.18

Wins
Name	School	Wins
Hillary Pattenden	Mercyhurst	23
Lucy Schoedel	Syracuse	16
Bailey Bram	Mercyhurst	10

Saves
Name	School	Saves
Lucy Schoedel	Syracuse	750
Jenni Bauer	Niagara	643
Daneca Butterfield	Robert Morris	567

Shutouts
Name	School	SO
Hillary Pattenden	Mercyhurst	4
Delayne Brian	Wayne State	3
Lucy Schoedel	Syracuse	3
Daneca Butterfield	Robert Morris	1

== Postseason ==
=== CHA tournament ===
==== CHA All-Tournament Team ====
- Forwards
  - Bailey Bram (Mercyhurst)
  - Lisa Mullan (Syracuse)
  - Jesse Scanzano (Mercyhurst)
- Defense
  - Melissa Lacroix (Mercyhurst)
  - Gabrielle Beaudry (Syracuse)
- Goalie
  - Lucy Schoedel (Syracuse)
- MVP: Ashley Cockell (Mercyhurst)

=== NCAA tournament ===
- It was announced on March 8 that Mercyhurst will be the No. 1 ranked team in the Frozen Four. The Lakers will host Boston University on Saturday, March 13 at 2:00 pm Eastern Time.

Record	Win %	F4	CG
0–1	.000	Mercyhurst lost to Cornell	

== CHA Awards and honors ==
Honor	Selection
Player of the Year	Vicki Bendus, F, Mercyhurst
Coach of the Year	Paul Flanagan, Syracuse
Freshman of the Year	Isabel Menard, F, Syracuse
Student Athlete of the Year	Christine Jefferson, Wayne State
CHA First Team	Vicki Bendus, F, Mercyhurst
CHA First Team	Jesse Scanzano, F, Mercyhurst
CHA First Team	Bailey Bram, F, Mercyhurst
CHA First Team	Isabel Menard, F, Syracuse
CHA First Team	Melissa Lacroix, D, Mercyhurst
CHA First Team	Cassea Schols, D, Mercyhurst
CHA First Team	Jenni Bauer, G, Niagara
CHA Second Team	Stefanie Marty, F, Syracuse
CHA Second Team	Veronique Laramee-Paquette, F, Wayne State
CHA Second Team	Brittaney Maschmeyer, D, Syracuse
CHA Second Team	Gabrielle Beaudry, D, Syracuse
CHA Second Team	Whitney Pappas, D, Robert Morris
CHA Second Team	Jill Szandzik, D, Wayne State
CHA Second Team	Lucy Schoedel, G, Syracuse
All-Freshman Team	Holly Carrie-Mattimoe, F, Syracuse
All-Freshman Team	Jenna Hendrikx, F, Niagara
All-Freshman Team	Isabel Menard, F, Syracuse
All-Freshman Team	Jenaya Townend, D, Wayne State
All-Freshman Team	Samantha Watt, D, Mercyhurst

=== CHA all-academic honors ===
- Mercyhurst
  - Vicki Bendus
  - Pamela Zgoda

== National awards and honors ==
- Vicki Bendus, Mercyhurst, Patty Kazmaier Award

== See also ==
- National Collegiate Women's Ice Hockey Championship
- 2009–10 NCAA Division I women's ice hockey season
- 2009–10 Eastern College Athletic Conference women's ice hockey season
- 2009–10 WCHA women's ice hockey season
