= 2009–10 Niagara Purple Eagles women's ice hockey season =

- Conference: 3 CHA
- Home ice: Dwyer Arena

Rankings
- USA Today/USA Hockey Magazine: Not ranked
- USCHO.com/CBS College Sports: Not ranked

Record
- Overall: 6-6-4
- Home: 0-1-1
- Road: 4-3-1

Coaches and captains
- Head coach: Chris MacKenzie
- Assistant coaches: Josh Sciba; Shivaun Siegl
- Captain: Frances McPhail

The Purple Eagles were the third most improved team in the NCAA (behind Quinnipiac and Ohio State, respectively). The Purple Eagles only won 6 games in 2008–09. Compared to 2009–10, the Purple Eagles won 14 games, an 8 win improvement.

Jenni Bauer started in net in every game en route to earning First-Team All-CHA honors. Bauer's 2.19 goals against average and .918 save percentage ranked second in the conference. Bauer was among 45 candidates nominated for the 2010 Patty Kazmaier Memorial Award (most outstanding player). Jenna Hendrikx became the first freshman to lead the Purple Eagles in goals (14) and points (24) since the 2004–05 season. Hendrix won three CHA Rookie of the Week awards and was named to the CHA All-Rookie Team

== Offseason ==
- April 7: Niagara welcomes seven newcomers for the upcoming season. The forwards are Kathleen Bortuzzo, Sarah Connelly, Daniela Dal Colle, Natasha Fryer, and Jenna Hendrikx. On defence, the newcomers are Carleah Angeles and Samantha Curk.
- May 20: Niagara alumnus Chris MacKenzie was named the head coach. The announcement was made by Niagara University's Director of Athletics Ed McLaughlin. MacKenzie will be the second head coach in the history of the program.
- June 24: Niagara announced the hiring of new assistant coach Shivaun Siegl. Siegl spent the 2008–09 season as an assistant coach at Rensselaer Polytechnic Institute (RPI). Her primary duties were working with goaltenders, video analysis and recruiting.
- Sept 17: Niagara has been predicted to finish fifth in the College Hockey America Preseason Coaches’ Poll, released Sept. 17 by CHA league officials.

== Exhibition ==
Date	Opponent	Score	Record
9/27/2009	Brock University	5-2	1-0-0

== Regular season ==
- November 13: On Nov. 14, the Purple Eagles will don pink jerseys in an effort to help Pink the Rink in the annual CHA's initiative Skate for the Cure game for breast health awareness.
- January 30: Niagara became only the second team all year, and the first in the CHA team to defeat Mercyhurst. The Purple Eagles defeated the Lakers 2-1. Jenni Bauer stopped 44 of 45 shots, including all 19 fired her way in the second period in what was a scoreless game until the 42nd minute. The victory was the first-ever for the Purple Eagles over a top-ranked team and their first over the Lakers since 2004. The result snapped Mercyhurst's nation-leading 16-game unbeaten streak and 26-game CHA unbeaten run.
- February 17: Jenni Bauer is among 45 nominees for the Patty Kazmaier Memorial Award.

=== Standings ===
2009–10 College Hockey America standings
	Overall							Conference					
	GP	W	L	T	PTS	GF	GA	GP	W	L	T	GF	GA
x, y: Mercyhurst	23	19	1	3	41	0	0	7	6	0	1	0	0
Syracuse	26	13	12	1	27	0	0	8	4	4	0	0	0
Wayne State	22	8	11	3	19	0	0	8	4	4	0	0	0
Niagara	22	8	10	4	20	0	0	8	3	3	2	0	0
Robert Morris	25	7	17	1	15	0	0	7	0	6	1	0	0

x: Regular season champion, y: Postseason champion

=== Roster ===
Number	Name	Class	Position	Height
	Carleah Angeles	Fr.	D	
33	Jenni Bauer	Jr.	G	5'5"
	Kathleen Bortuzzo	Fr.	F	5'1"
21	Kayla Colang	So.	F	
	Sarah Connelly	Fr.	F	
	Samantha Curk	Fr.	D	5'8"
	Daniela Dal Colle	Fr.	F	
5	Kara Edwards	Jr.	D	5'8"
	Natasha Fryer	Fr.	F	5'7"
27	Rachel Hauser	Sr.	D	5'4"
	Jenna Hendrikx	Fr.	F	5'10"
24	Christina Jablonski	Sr.	D/F	5'5"
89	Caitlin Jenkins	So.	F	5'4"
13	Jocey Kleiber	So.	D	5'6"
7	Nathalie Larsen	Jr.	F	5'4"
18	Jennifer MacLean	Sr.	F	5'7"
14	Alison Malty	Sr.	D	5'5"
4	Mary McKinnon	Sr.	F	5'3"
19	Frances McPhail	Sr.	F	5'7"
	Erica Owczarczak	So.	D	5'6"
17	Megan Price	Sr.	D/F	5'8"
31	Amanda Rowe	Sr.	G	5'6"
9	Jacqueline Spring	Sr.	F	5'8"
22	Autumn Stuntz	Jr.	F	5'1"
23	Leah Whittaker	So.	D	5'6"
10	Sarah Zacharias	So.	D	5'9"
1	Jill Zelonis	Sr.	G	5'5"

=== Schedule ===
Date	Opponent	Time	Score	Record
10/2/2009	at St. Cloud State (St. Cloud, Minn.)	7:07 PM	Loss, 4-3	0-1-0
10/3/2009	at St. Cloud State (St. Cloud, Minn.)	4:07 PM	Win, 3-1	1-1-0
10/9/2009	RPI (NIAGARA UNIV., N.Y.)	2:00 PM	Loss, 2-0	1-2-0
10/10/2009	RPI (NIAGARA UNIV., N.Y.)	2:00 PM	Tie, 3-3	1-2-1
10/17/2009	at New Hampshire (Durham, N.H.)	2:00 PM	Tie, 3-3	1-2-2
10/18/2009	at New Hampshire (Durham, N.H.)	2:00 PM	Loss, 6-1	1-3-2
10/23/2009	at Quinnipiac (Hamden, Conn.)	7:00 PM	Win, 3-2 (OT)	2-3-2
10/24/2009	at Quinnipiac (Hamden, Conn.)	4:00 PM	Win, 2-1	3-3-2
11/6/2009	at Syracuse (Syracuse, N.Y.)	7:00 PM	Loss, 2-1	3-4-2
11/7/2009	at Syracuse (Syracuse, N.Y.)	2:00 PM	Win, 3-2	4-4-2
11/14/2009	ROBERT MORRIS (NIAGARA UNIV., N.Y.)	7:00 PM		
11/15/2009	ROBERT MORRIS (NIAGARA UNIV., N.Y.)	2:00 PM		
11/20/2009	MERCYHURST (NIAGARA UNIV., N.Y.)	7:00 PM		
11/21/2009	MERCYHURST (NIAGARA UNIV., N.Y.)	2:00 PM		
11/28/2009	at Cornell (Ithaca, N.Y.)	7:00 PM		
11/29/2009	at Cornell (Ithaca, N.Y.)	2:00 PM		
12/2009	WAYNE STATE (NIAGARA UNIV., N.Y.)	2:00 PM		
12/13/2009	WAYNE STATE (NIAGARA UNIV., N.Y.)	1:00 PM		
1/8/2010	COLGATE (NIAGARA UNIV., N.Y.)	2:00 PM		
1/9/2010	COLGATE (NIAGARA UNIV., N.Y.)	2:00 PM		
1/23/2010	NORTHEASTERN (NIAGARA UNIV., N.Y.)	7:00 PM	1-2	
1/24/2010	NORTHEASTERN (NIAGARA UNIV., N.Y.)	2:00 PM	2-6	
1/29/2010	at Mercyhurst (Erie, Pa.)	7:00 PM		
1/30/2010	at Mercyhurst (Erie, Pa.)	2:00 PM		
2/5/2010	SYRACUSE (NIAGARA UNIV., N.Y.)	7:00 PM		
2/6/2010	SYRACUSE (NIAGARA UNIV., N.Y.)	2:00 PM		
2/12/2010	at Wayne State (Detroit, Mich.)	7:00 PM		
2/13/2010	at Wayne State (Detroit, Mich.)	2:00 PM		
2/19/2010	at Robert Morris (Moon Township, Pa.)	7:00 PM		
2/20/2010	at Robert Morris (Moon Township, Pa.)	7:00 PM		
3/4/2010	vs. CHA Tournament (TBA) TBA			

== Player stats ==
= Indicates team leader

=== Skaters ===
Player	Games	Goals	Assists	Points	Points/game	PIM	GWG	PPG	SHG
Jenna Hendrikx	31	14	10	24	0.7742	26	3	1	0
Jennifer MacLean	31	10	12	22	0.7097	22	2	4	0
Frances McPhail	31	6	11	17	0.5484	22	1	1	0
Kathleen Bortuzzo	31	3	8	11	0.3548	6	0	0	0
Caitlin Jenkins	29	5	5	10	0.3448	26	2	4	0
Mary McKinnon	31	5	5	10	0.3226	43	0	4	0
Erica Owczarczak	29	2	7	9	0.3103	26	1	1	0
Daniela Dal Colle	31	4	4	8	0.2581	4	0	2	0
Jacquiline Spring	31	4	3	7	0.2258	16	1	0	0
Leah Whittaker	30	3	3	6	0.2000	30	1	1	1
Alison Malty	19	1	5	6	0.3158	14	1	0	0
Autumn Stuntz	31	2	3	5	0.1613	24	0	0	1
Christina Jablonski	31	1	4	5	0.1613	18	0	0	0
Carleah Angeles	22	1	4	5	0.2273	10	0	1	0
Jocey Kleiber	31	1	4	5	0.1613	22	0	1	0
Natasha Fryer	19	3	0	3	0.1579	2	0	0	0
Sarah Connelly	31	0	3	3	0.0968	0	0	0	0
Kara Edwards	21	0	2	2	0.0952	8	0	0	0
Sarah Zacharias	16	1	0	1	0.0625	2	0	0	0
Samantha Curk	5	1	0	1	0.2000	2	0	1	0
Michaela DiFazio	10	0	0	0	0.0000	2	0	0	0
Kayla Colang	4	0	0	0	0.0000	0	0	0	0
Jill Zelonis	2	0	0	0	0.0000	0	0	0	0
Amanda Rowe	1	0	0	0	0.0000	0	0	0	0
Nathalie Larsen	12	0	0	0	0.0000	2	0	0	0
Jenni Bauer	31	0	0	0	0.0000	0	0	0	0
Rachel Hauser	1	0	0	0	0.0000	0	0	0	0

=== Goaltenders ===
Player	Games	Wins	Losses	Ties	Goals against	Minutes	GAA	Shutouts	Saves	Save %
Amanda Rowe	1	0	0	0	0	4	0.0000	0	0	.000
Jenni Bauer	31	12	14	5	70	1869	2.2476	0	755	.915
Jill Zelonis	2	0	0	0	1	10	6.1017	0	3	.750

== Postseason ==
On March 5, 2010, the Orange won the first playoff game in program history. Sophomore Lisa Mullan scored two goals, as the Orange defeated Niagara by a score of 5-3.

== Awards and honors ==
- Jenni Bauer, CHA Defensive Player of the Week (November 16)
- Jenni Bauer, CHA Defensive Player of the Week (November 30)
- Jenni Bauer, CHA Defensive Player of the Week (February 1)
- Jenni Bauer, First Team All-CHA
- Kathleen Bortuzzo, CHA Rookie of the Week (Week of February 22)
- Daniela Del Colle, CHA Player of the Week (Week of February 15)
- Jenna Hendrikx, CHA Rookie Of The Week Award (Oct 6, 2009)
- Jenna Hendrikx, CHA Rookie Of The Week Award (Oct 26, 2009)
- Jenna Hendrikx, CHA All-Rookie Team

=== Team awards ===
- Goalie Jenni Bauer and forward Jennifer MacLean were named co-MVPs.
- Frances McPhail was honored with the Brother Steve Award, which is giving to the player that demonstrates dedication and commitment to the team. McPhail was part of the season-long “Pink the Rink” program to raise funds to fight breast cancer.
- The Rookie of the Year award went to forward Jenna Hendrikx.
- Daniela Dal Colle was named Most Improved Player.
- Sophomore forward Nathalie Larsen and senior defenseman Allison Malty were honored with the Jennifer Goulet Award.

== See also ==
- 2009–10 College Hockey America women's ice hockey season
