= 2009–10 Robert Morris Colonials women's ice hockey season =

- Conference: 3 CHA

Rankings
- USA Today/USA Hockey Magazine: Not ranked
- USCHO.com/CBS College Sports: Not ranked

Record
- Overall: 4-6-0
- Home: 0-2-0
- Road: 4-4-0

Coaches and captains
- Head coach: Nate Handrahan

== Offseason ==
- August 10 : Nate Handrahan announced the signing of seven athletes to National Letters of Intent, which increases his 2009-10 recruiting class to 10 athletes.
- August 24, 2009 - Former RMU goalie Brianne McLaughlin was selected as one of three goalies to the 2009-10 U.S. Women's National Team.
- Sept 17: Robert Morris has been predicted to finish second in the College Hockey America Preseason Coaches' Poll, released Sept. 17 by CHA league officials. They came in second with 14 points after finishing with a 5-9-2 mark in conference play a season ago.

== 2009-10 National Letter of Intent Signees ==
Name	Position	Height	Previous Team
Dayna Newsom	F	5-6	Oakville Ice
Courtney Langston	F	5-4	Shattuck St. Mary's
Kathleen McDonald	F	5-4	Team BC & POE
Whitney Henderson	F	5-3	Princeton Tiger Lilies
Jennifer Kindret	F	5-8	BC Breakers
Jamie Joslin	D	5-9	Aurora Panthers
Marissa Angel	G	5-4	Princeton Tiger Lilies
Cobina Delaney			Ottawa Senators
Kelsey Thomas			Hamilton Hawks
Kristen DiCiocco			Stoney Creek Jr. Sabres

== Exhibition ==
Date	Opponent	Location	Time	Score
Sun, Sep 27	Wilfrid Laurier	Pittsburgh, Pa.	4:00 p.m.	RMU, 4-0

== Regular season ==
- November 25: The Colonials announced five players signed Letters of Intent to play hockey for the team in 2010-11. The signees are: Thea Imbrogno (Mississauga Jr. Chiefs), Rebecca Vint (Brampton Jr. Thunder), Laura Brooker (Cambridge Fury), Brandi Pollock (Westman Wildcats) and Anneline Lauziere (London Devilettes).
- November 26: The Colonials will host the Rensselaer Engineers in part of College Hockey America's Skate for the Cure Campaign. This marks the fourth year of the event and all CHA institutions participate in the event.
- December 6: The Robert Morris vs. Mercyhurst game on Sunday, December 6 at 1:00 p.m. has been postponed due to a water main break at the Mercyhurst Ice Center. The game is rescheduled for Tuesday, February 2 at 7:00 p.m.
- December 17: Former Robert Morris Colonials goaltender Brianne McLaughlin was selected as one of three goalies to the 2010 U.S. Olympic Women's Ice Hockey Team. McLaughlin is the first-ever Colonial to compete in the Olympic Games.
- February 17: Brianna Delaney and Sara O'Mally are among 45 nominees for the Patty Kazmaier Memorial Award.

=== Standings ===
2009–10 College Hockey America standings
	Overall							Conference					
	GP	W	L	T	PTS	GF	GA	GP	W	L	T	GF	GA
x, y: Mercyhurst	23	19	1	3	41	0	0	7	6	0	1	0	0
Syracuse	26	13	12	1	27	0	0	8	4	4	0	0	0
Wayne State	22	8	11	3	19	0	0	8	4	4	0	0	0
Niagara	22	8	10	4	20	0	0	8	3	3	2	0	0
Robert Morris	25	7	17	1	15	0	0	7	0	6	1	0	0

x: Regular season champion, y: Postseason champion

== Roster ==
Number	Name	Position	Height	Year
6	Giambra, Mallory	D	5-7	Sr.
7	Ketcher, Carissa	F	5-4	Jr.
8	Delaney, Brianna	F	5-6	So.
9	Henderson, Whitney	F	5-3	Fr.
11	Pietrangelo, Paige	D	5-11	So.
12	Gibson, Jacki	D	5-9	Sr.
14	Kindret, Jennifer	F	5-8	Fr.
15	Pappas, Whitney	D	5-7	Jr.
16	O'Malley, Sara	F	5-7	Jr.
17	Thomas, Kelsey	F	5-5	Fr.
18	McDonald, Kathleen	F	5-4	Fr.
19	Riley, Jessica	F	5-8	Sr.
20	Langston, Courtney	F	5-4	Fr.
21	Walkland, Chelsea	F	5-6	Sr.
22	Stack, Kathryn	D	5-6	So.
24	Newsom, Dayna	F	5-6	Fr.
25	Joslin, Jamie	D	5-9	Fr.
26	Delaney, Cobina	F	5-7	Fr.
27	Riley, Jordan	F	5-8	Sr.
29	Stoa, Maria	F	5-7	Jr.
30	Angel, Marissa	G	5-4	Fr.
31	Butterfield, Daneca	G	5-5	Jr.
33	DiCiocco, Kristen	G	5-7	Fr.

== Schedule ==
Date	Opponent	Location	Time	Score	Record
Fri, Oct 02	Minn.-Duluth	at Duluth, Minn.	7:07 p.m.	Loss, 5-2	0-1-0
Sat, Oct 03	Minn.-Duluth	at Duluth, Minn.	2:07 p.m.	Win, 4-1	1-1-0
Fri, Oct 09	Boston University	at Boston, Mass.	7:00 p.m.	Loss, 4-3	1-2-0
Sat, Oct 10	Northeastern	at Boston, Mass.	2:00 p.m.	Loss, 0-4	1-3-0
Fri, Oct 16	ST. LAWRENCE	Pittsburgh, Pa.	7:05 p.m.	Loss, 2-3	1-4-0
Sat, Oct 17	ST. LAWRENCE	Pittsburgh, Pa.	4:00 p.m.	Loss, 3-6	1-5-0
Fri, Oct 23	Maine	at Orono, Maine	7:00 p.m.	Win, 3-1	2-5-0
Sat, Oct 24	Maine	at Orono, Maine	2:00 p.m.	Win, 1-0 (OT)	3-5-0
Fri, Nov 06	Wisconsin	at Madison, Wisc.	7:07 p.m.	Win, 3-1	4-5-0
Sat, Nov 07	Wisconsin	at Madison, Wisc.	2:07 p.m.	Loss, 3-2 (OT)	4-6-0
Sat, Nov 14	Niagara *	at Niagara, N.Y.	7:00 p.m.	Loss, 3-1	4-7-0
Sun, Nov 15	Niagara *	at Niagara, N.Y.	2:00 p.m.	Tie, 2-2	4-7-1
Fri, Nov 20	SYRACUSE *	Pittsburgh, Pa.	7:05 p.m.	Loss, 4-0	4-8-1
Sat, Nov 21	SYRACUSE *	Pittsburgh, Pa.	7:05 p.m.	Loss, 4-2	4-9-1
Fri, Nov 27	RENSSELAER	Pittsburgh, Pa.	2:05 p.m.	Loss, 5-2	
Sat, Nov 28	RENSSELAER	Pittsburgh, Pa.	2:05 p.m.	Win, 3-1	
Sat, Dec 05	Mercyhurst *	at Erie, Pa.	4:00 p.m.	Loss, 6-2	
Sun, Dec 06	Mercyhurst *	at Erie, Pa.	2:00 p.m.	Postponed	
Sat, Jan 02	Ohio State	at Columbus, Ohio	2:00 p.m.		
Sun, Jan 03	Ohio State	at Columbus, Ohio	2:00 p.m.		
Fri, Jan 08	CONNECTICUT	Pittsburgh, Pa. TBA			
Sat, Jan 09	CONNECTICUT	Pittsburgh, Pa.	4:00 p.m.		
Fri, Jan 15	Wayne State *	at Detroit, Mich.	7:00 p.m.		
Sat, Jan 16	Wayne State *	at Detroit, Mich.	2:00 p.m.		
Fri, Jan 22	SACRED HEART	Pittsburgh, Pa.	7:05 p.m.		
Sat, Jan 23	SACRED HEART	Pittsburgh, Pa.	7:05 p.m.		
Fri, Feb 05	MERCYHURST *	Pittsburgh, Pa.	7:05 p.m.		
Sat, Feb 06	MERCYHURST *	Pittsburgh, Pa.	7:05 p.m.		
Fri, Feb 12	Syracuse *	at Syracuse, N.Y.	7:00 p.m.		
Sat, Feb 13	Syracuse *	at Syracuse, N.Y.	7:00 p.m.		
Fri, Feb 19	NIAGARA *	Pittsburgh, Pa.	7:05 p.m.		
Sat, Feb 20	NIAGARA *	Pittsburgh, Pa.	7:05 p.m.		
Fri, Feb 26	WAYNE STATE *	Pittsburgh, Pa.	7:05 p.m.		
Sat, Feb 27	WAYNE STATE *	Pittsburgh, Pa.	7:05 p.m.		

== Player stats ==
= Indicates team leader

=== Skaters ===
Player	Games	Goals	Assists	Points	Points/game	PIM	GWG	PPG	SHG
Brianna Delaney	36	14	17	31	0.8611	38	2	6	0
Sara O'Malley	36	18	12	30	0.8333	12	3	1	2
Maria Stoa	34	3	15	18	0.5294	34	1	2	0
Jennifer Kindret	36	9	8	17	0.4722	29	2	1	0
Cobina Delaney	35	1	12	13	0.3714	18	0	1	0
Dayna Newsom	36	6	6	12	0.3333	20	0	1	0
Kelsey Thomas	35	6	6	12	0.3429	34	1	0	0
Whitney Pappas	36	4	8	12	0.3333	20	1	0	0
Jacki Gibson	36	2	9	11	0.3056	16	0	2	0
Jamie Joslin	36	6	3	9	0.2500	30	0	5	0
Kathleen McDonald	31	4	4	8	0.2581	6	0	2	0
Jordan Riley	36	2	3	5	0.1389	10	0	0	0
Mallory Giambra	36	1	4	5	0.1389	10	0	0	0
Chelsea Walkland	35	2	2	4	0.1143	24	0	0	0
Kathryn Stack	36	0	4	4	0.1111 22	0	0	0	
Courtney Langston	25	2	1	3	0.1200	4	0	1	0
Whitney Henderson	8	1	1	2	0.2500	0	0	0	0
Carissa Ketcher	15	1	1	2	0.1333	0	1	0	0
Jessica Riley	34	0	2	2	0.0588 18	0	0	0	
Kristen DiCiocco	13	0	1	1	0.0769	0	0	0	0
Daneca Butterfield	29	0	0	0	0.0000	2	0	0	0
Paige Pietrangelo	33	0	0	0	0.0000	28	0	0	0
Marissa Angel	1	0	0	0	0.0000	0	0	0	0

=== Goaltenders ===
Name	GP	GA	W	L	T	SO	GAA
Daneca Butterfield	9	553:01	4	5	0	1	2.50

== Awards and honors ==
- Daneca Butterfield, CHA Defensive Player of Week (Week of Oct 6)
- Daneca Butterfield, CHA Defensive Player of Week (Week of Oct 26)
- Daneca Butterfield, CHA Defensive Player of Week (Week of Nov 9)
- Brianna Delaney, CHA Player of the Week (November 16)
- Jacki Gibson, CHA Defensive Player of the Year (Week of October 12)
- Jamie Joslin, RMU Rookie of the Year (2009–10)
- Jennifer Kindret, CHA Rookie of the Week (November 9)
- Jennifer Kindret, CHA Rookie of the Week (Week of Jan 25)
- Sara O'Malley, CHA Offensive Player of Week (Week of Jan 25)
- Chelsea Walkland, Frozen Four Skills Competition participant

=== Pre-Season All-CHA Team ===
- F - Brianna Delaney, (tie)

=== Second Team All-CHA ===
- Whitney Pappas, Second Team All-CHA

== See also ==
- 2009–10 College Hockey America women's ice hockey season
