= 2009–10 ECAC Hockey women's season =

2009–10 ECAC Hockey women's ice hockey season
- League: NCAA Division I
- Sport: Ice hockey
- Duration: September 2009 through March, 2010

Regular Season
- Champion: Cornell Big Red
- Runners-Up: Clarkson Golden Knights
- Season MVP: Catherine White

Tournament
- Champions: Cornell Big Red
- Runners-up: Clarkson Golden Knights
- Finals MVP: Kendice Ogilvie

Ice hockey seasons
- 08–09 10–11

The 2009–10 ECAC Hockey women's ice hockey season marked the continuation of the annual tradition of competitive ice hockey among ECAC Hockey members.

== Pre-season ==
- September 22: St. Lawrence, which has finished among the top three teams in the regular-season standings each year since 2000–01, has been selected to finish in first place in the ECAC in the preseason poll. The voting was done by the league coaches as part of the pre-season polls and all-league team.

The Saints, garnered a total of 107 points, including three of 12 first-place votes. St. Lawrence, boasts returning all-league selection senior defender Britni Smith. Last season, the team finished second in the regular-season standings with a mark of 16-5-1.

Harvard claimed three first-place votes to finish second in the poll. The Crimson earned 103 total points. Harvard is the two-time defending regular-season champion. Dartmouth gained five first place votes, and is slotted to finish third in regular-season play according to the voting. The Big Green compiled 93 points in the poll. Princeton ranks fourth in the preseason poll with 89 points. Clarkson occupies the fifth slot with 85 points, earning one first-place vote. ECAC Hockey Championship runner-up Rensselaer was selected to finish in sixth place, with 74 points.

=== ECAC pre-season coaches poll ===
| Place | School | First place votes | Total points |
| 1 | St. Lawrence | (3) | 107 |
| 2 | Harvard | (3) | 103 |
| 3 | Dartmouth | (5) | 93 |
| 4 | Princeton | (0) | 89 |
| 5 | Clarkson | (1) | 85 |
| 6 | Rensselaer | (0) | 74 |
| 7 | Cornell | (0) | 68 |
| 8 | Colgate | (0) | 52 |
| 9 | Quinnipiac | (0) | 37 |
| 10 | Yale | (0) | 34 |
| 11 | Brown | (0) | 24 |
| 12 | Union | (0) | 11 |

=== Pre-season All-ECAC team ===
| Position | Name | School | Class |
| F | Dominique Thibault | Clarkson | |
| F | Jenna Cunningham | Dartmouth | Sr. |
| F | Catherine White | Cornell | So |
| D | Sasha Sherry | Princeton | Jr |
| D | Britni Smith | St. Lawrence | Sr |
| G | Christina Kessler | Harvard | Sr |

=== CIS exhibition ===
| Date | Location | NCAA school | CIS team | Score |
| Sun. Sept 27 | Matthers Arena | Northeastern | McGill | McGill, 3-1 |
| Sat. Oct 3 | Appleton Arena | St. Lawrence | McGill | St. Lawrence, 2-1 |
| Fri. Oct 23 | Hanover, N.H. | Dartmouth | McGill | |
| Sun. Oct 25 | New Haven, CT | Yale | McGill | |

=== Canadian semipro exhibition ===
| Date | Location | NCAA school | Canadian team | Score |
| 9/26/2009 | Cheel Arena | Clarkson | Ottawa Senators (PWHL) | Clarkson, 7-3 |
| 10/18/2009 | Lynah Rink | Cornell Big Red | Toronto Aeros | |

== Regular season ==
=== Standings ===
2009–10 Eastern College Athletic Conference standings
| | Conference | | | | | | | Overall | | | | | |
| | GP | W | L | T | PTS | GF | GA | GP | W | L | T | GF | GA |
|---|---|---|---|---|---|---|---|---|---|---|---|---|---|
| Cornell | 22 | 14 | 2 | 6 | 34 | 67 | 26 | 36 | 21 | 9 | 6 | 103 | 63 |
| Clarkson | 22 | 14 | 5 | 3 | 31 | 47 | 28 | 40 | 23 | 12 | 5 | 104 | 69 |
| Harvard | 22 | 13 | 6 | 3 | 29 | 69 | 40 | 33 | 20 | 8 | 5 | 94 | 54 |
| Quinnipiac | 22 | 11 | 4 | 7 | 29 | 44 | 28 | 37 | 19 | 10 | 8 | 79 | 51 |
| Rensselaer | 22 | 11 | 7 | 4 | 26 | 56 | 42 | 37 | 16 | 15 | 6 | 87 | 77 |
| Princeton | 22 | 11 | 7 | 4 | 26 | 52 | 42 | 31 | 13 | 14 | 4 | 72 | 70 |
| St. Lawrence | 22 | 11 | 8 | 3 | 25 | 50 | 41 | 37 | 16 | 14 | 7 | 88 | 85 |
| Colgate | 22 | 8 | 10 | 4 | 20 | 51 | 68 | 36 | 12 | 20 | 4 | 86 | 129 |
| Dartmouth | 22 | 9 | 12 | 1 | 19 | 70 | 60 | 28 | 12 | 14 | 2 | 90 | 78 |
| Yale | 22 | 8 | 13 | 1 | 17 | 36 | 55 | 29 | 10 | 16 | 3 | 56 | 75 |
| Brown | 22 | 1 | 18 | 3 | 5 | 22 | 73 | 28 | 3 | 21 | 4 | 41 | 95 |
| Union | 22 | 1 | 20 | 1 | 3 | 14 | 75 | 34 | 5 | 28 | 1 | 36 | 110 |

| = Qualified for NCAA Frozen Four | = Qualified for NCAA Tournament |

=== US Olympic exhibition games ===
On January 3, the ECAC fielded an all-star team to take on the US Olympic Team. Caitlin Cahow (Branford, Conn.), Natalie Darwitz (Eagan, Minn.) and Jocelyne Lamoureux (Grand Forks, N.D.) each tallied two goals in pacing Team USA to victory.

| Date | Location | NCAA school | Score |
| January 3 | TD Bank Sports Center | ECAC All-Stars | 6-2, US |

==== Box scores ====
| Period | Goal | Assists | Time of goal |
| 1 | Angela Ruggiero (USA) | Julie Chu | 0:21 |
| 1 | Hilary Knight (USA) | | 4:56 |
| 1 | Caitlin Cahow (USA) | Monique Lamoureux | 12:32 |
| 2 | Jocelyne Lamoureux (USA) | Erika Lawler | 2:38 |
| 2 | Caitlin Cahow (2) (USA) | | 9:13 |
| 2 | Akstull (ECAC) | Bassett | 9:13 |
| 2 | McDonald (ECAC) | Buesser | 16:51 |
| 2 | Natalie Darwitz (USA) | Knight, Stack | 19:50 |
| 3 | Natalie Darwitz (USA) | Chesson | 12:40 |
| 3 | Jocelyne Lamoureux (USA) | Knight | 13:00 |

=== October ===
- Oct. 21: Former Harvard player Angela Ruggiero was nominated for the Jefferson Award for Public Service.

=== November ===
- Nov. 17: For the second consecutive week, Clarkson, Cornell, and Princeton earned spots in the top 10 in the USCHO.com national poll released Monday, November 16 and the USA Today/USA Hockey Magazine Poll released Tuesday, November 17.

== In season honors ==
Players of the week

Throughout the conference regular season, Eastern College Athletic Conference offices names a player of the week each Monday.

=== Offensive players of the week ===
| Week | Off. player of the week |
|---|---|
| 10/12/09 | Juana Babineau, Clarkson |
| 10/19/09 | Melissa Waldie, Clarkson |
| 10/26/09 | Britney Selina, Clarkson |
| 11/02/09 | Kali Gillanders, Clarkson |
| 11/09/09 | Carlee Eusepi, Clarkson |
| 11/16/09 | Kate Buesser, Harvard |
| 11/23/09 | |
| 11/30/09 | |
| 12/7/09 | |
| 12/14/09 | |
| 12/21/09 | |
| 12/28/08 | |
| 1/4/10 | |
| 1/11/10 | |
| 1/18/10 | |
| 1/25/10 | |
| 2/1/10 | |
| 2/8/10 | |
| 2/15/10 | |
| 2/22/10 | Randi Griffin, Harvard |
| 3/1/10 | |
| 3/8/10 | |

=== Defensive players of the week ===
| Week | Def. player of the week |
|---|---|
| 10/12/09 | Lauren Dahm, Clarkson |
| 10/19/09 | Victoria Vigilanti, Quinnipiac |
| 10/26/09 | Lauren Dahm, Clarkson |
| 11/02/09 | Amanda Mazzotta, Cornell |
| 11/09/09 | Cassie Seguin, Princeton |
| 11/16/09 | Katie Jamieson, Brown |
| 11/23/09 | |
| 11/30/09 | |
| 12/7/09 | |
| 12/14/09 | |
| 12/21/09 | |
| 12/28/08 | |
| 1/4/10 | |
| 1/11/10 | |
| 1/18/10 | |
| 1/25/10 | |
| 2/1/10 | |
| 2/8/10 | |
| 2/15/10 | |
| 2/22/10 | Victoria Vigilanti, Quinnipiac |
| 3/1/10 | Sonja van der Bliek, RPI |
| 3/8/10 | |

=== Rookie of the week ===
| Week | Rookie of the week |
|---|---|
| 10/12/09 | Jamie Goldsmith, St. Lawrence |
| 10/19/09 | Kelly Sabatine, St. Lawrence |
| 10/26/09 | Kayla Sullivan, St. Lawrence |
| 11/02/09 | Heather Hughes, Quinnipiac |
| 11/09/09 | Cassie Seguin, Princeton |
| 11/16/09 | Jillian Dempsey, Harvard |
| 11/23/09 | |
| 11/30/09 | |
| 12/7/09 | |
| 12/14/09 | |
| 12/21/09 | |
| 12/28/08 | |
| 1/4/10 | |
| 1/11/10 | |
| 1/18/10 | |
| 1/25/10 | |
| 2/1/10 | |
| 2/8/10 | |
| 2/15/10 | |
| 2/22/10 | Laurie Jolin, Brown |
| 3/1/10 | |
| 3/8/10 | |

== 2010 Olympics ==
=== Active players ===
The following active ECAC players represented their respective countries in Ice hockey at the 2010 Winter Olympics.

| Player | NCAA school | Nationality | Position | Goals | Assists | Points | Finish |
| Rebecca Johnston | Cornell | Canada | Forward | 1 | 5 | 6 | Gold |
| Sarah Vaillancourt | Harvard | Canada | Forward | 3 | 5 | 8 | Gold |

=== Former players ===
| Player | NCAA school | Nationality | Position | Goals | Assists | Points | Medal |
| Gillian Apps | Dartmouth | Canada | Forward | 3 | 4 | 7 | Gold |
| Jennifer Botterill | Harvard | Canada | Forward | 0 | 2 | 2 | Gold |
| Julie Chu | Harvard | United States | Forward | | | | Silver |
| Becky Kellar | Brown | United States | Forward | 0 | 4 | 4 | Gold |
| Gina Kingsbury | St. Lawrence | Canada | Forward | 2 | 1 | 3 | Gold |
| Cherie Piper | Dartmouth | Canada | Forward | 5 | 5 | 10 | Gold |
| Angela Ruggiero | Harvard | United States | Defence | | | | Silver |

== Statistical leaders ==
Goals
| Name | School | Goals |
| K. Stewart | Colgate | 22 |
| D. Thibault | Clarkson | 21 |
| S. Parsons | Dartmouth | 20 |
| J. Cunningham | Dartmouth | 18 |
| A. Trunzo | Dartmouth | 18 |

Assists
| Name | School | Assists |
| C. White | Cornell | 24 |
| K. Buesser | Harvard | 22 |
| B. Selina | Clarkson | 22 |
| S. Parsons | Dartmouth | 20 |
| D. Thibault | Clarkson | 18 |

Points
| Name | School | Points |
| S. Parsons | Dartmouth | 40 |
| D. Thibault | Clarkson | 39 |
| K. Buesser | Harvard | 37 |
| K. Stewart | Colgate | 37 |
| C. White | Cornell | 34 |

Plus/minus
| Name | School | +/- |
| K. Buesser | Harvard | +26 |
| C. Eusepi | Clarkson | +24 |
| J. Dempsey | Harvard | +21 |
| T. Schroeder | Clarkson | +20 |
| J. Duffy | Quinnipiac | +20 |

Goals Against
| Name | School | Goals against |
| V. Vigilanti | Quinnipiac | 1.23 |
| L. Bellamy | Harvard | 1.32 |
| A. Mazzotta | Cornell | 1.38 |
| C. Kessler | Harvard | 1.39 |
| L. Dahm | Clarkson | 1.48 |

Win Percentage
| Name | School | Win % |
| L. Bellamy | Harvard | .733 |
| C. Kessler | Harvard | .700 |
| L. Dahm | Clarkson | .681 |
| A. Mazzotta | Cornell | .667 |
| V. Vigilanti | Quinnipiac | .629 |

Saves
| Name | School | Saves |
| V. Vigilanti | Quinnipiac | 891 |
| K. Jamieson | Brown | 855 |
| L. Dahm | Clarkson | 799 |
| A. Marcinko | Union | 757 |
| S. van der Bliek | RPI | 754 |

Save percentage
| Name | School | Save % |
| V. Vigilanti | Quinnipiac | .951 |
| C. Kessler | Harvard | .944 |
| L. Bellamy | Harvard | .938 |
| L. Dahm | Clarkson | .937 |
| A. Mazzotta | Cornell | .928 |

== Post-season ==
=== ECAC tournament ===
Semifinals
Cornell
RPI
Clarkson
Harvard

Finals
Cornell

=== ECAC All-Tournament team ===
| Position | Player | School |
| G | Amanda Mazzotta | Cornell |
| D | Danielle Boudreau | Clarkson |
| D | Lauriane Rougeau | Cornell |
| F | Chelsea Karpenko | Cornell |
| F | Gabrielle Kosziwka | Clarkson |
| F | Liza Ryabkina | Cornell |

=== NCAA tournament ===
| Record | Win % | R32 | S16 | E8 | F4 | CG |
|---|---|---|---|---|---|---|
| 0–0 | | | | | | |

== ECAC awards and honors ==
- March 3: The leagues head coaches have voted for the Best Defensive Forward award. The finalists were named and include the following players: Sarah Parsons (Dartmouth), Britney Selina (Clarkson), Allison Wright (Rensselaer) and Liz Zorn (Cornell).
- March 4: Kate Buesser (Harvard), Sarah Parsons (Dartmouth), Catherine White (Cornell) have been named a finalist for the ECAC Player of the Year Award.
- March 4: Lauren Dahm (Clarkson), Amanda Mazzotta (Cornell) and Victoria Vigilanti (Quinnipiac) have been named as finalists for the ECAC Goalie of the Year.
- March 5: Laura Gersten (Rensselaer), Sarah Parsons, (Dartmouth) and Randi Griffin (Harvard) are the finalists for the ECAC Student Athlete of the Year.

| Honor | Selection |
|---|---|
| Player of the Year | Catherine White, Cornell |
| Coach of the Year | |
| Freshman of the Year | Victoria Vigilanti, Quinnipiac |
| Goalie of the Year | Victoria Vigilanti, Quinnipiac |
| Student Athlete of the Year | |
| ECAC First Team | Catherine White, Cornell |
| ECAC First Team | Kate Buesser, Harvard |
| ECAC First Team | Katie Stewart, Colgate |
| ECAC First Team | Laura Fortino, Cornell |
| ECAC First Team | Lauriane Rougeau, Cornell |
Victoria Vigilanti, Quinnipiac
| ECAC Second Team | Sarah Parsons, Dartmouth |
| ECAC Second Team | Jenna Cunningham, Dartmouth |
| ECAC Second Team | Britney Selina, Clarkson |
| ECAC Second Team | Britni Smith, St. Lawrence |
| ECAC Second Team | Carlee Eusepi, Clarkson |
Lauren Dahm, Clarkson
| ECAC Third Team | Whitney Naslund, Rensselaer |
| ECAC Third Team | Paula Romanchuk, Princeton |
| ECAC Third Team | Dominique Thibault, Clarkson |
| ECAC Third Team | Laura Gersten, Rensselaer |
| ECAC Third Team | Leanna Coskren, Harvard |
| ECAC Third Team | Sasha Sherry, Princeton |
Amanda Mazzotta, Cornell
| All-Freshman Team | Jillian Dempsey, Harvard |
| All-Freshman Team | Heather Hughes, Quinnipiac |
| All-Freshman Team | Camille Dumais, Dartmouth |
| All-Freshman Team | Laura Fortino, Cornell |
| All-Freshman Team | Lauriane Rougeau, Cornell |
| All-Freshman Team | Victoria Vigilanti, Quinnipiac |

=== All-Decade team ===
The All-Decade team involves players who played in the ECAC between 1999-00 and 2008–09.

==== First team ====
| Player | Position | School |
| Jennifer Botterill | Forward | Harvard |
| Julie Chu | Forward | Harvard |
| Sarah Vaillancourt | Forward | Harvard |
| Tara Mounsey | Defense | Brown |
| Angela Ruggiero | Defense | Harvard |
| Ali Brewer | Goaltender | Brown |

==== Second team ====
| Player | Position | School |
| Gillian Apps | Forward | Dartmouth |
| Nicole Corriero | Forward | Harvard |
| Sabrina Harbec | Forward | St. Lawrence |
| Annie Guay | Defense | St. Lawrence |
| Caitlin Cahow | Defense | Harvard |
| Rachel Barrie | Goaltender | St. Lawrence |

== National awards and honors ==
- Dartmouth forward Sarah Parsons, Top 10 Finalist, Patty Kazmaier Award
- St. Lawrence defenseman Britni Smith, Top 10 Finalist, Patty Kazmaier Award

== See also ==
- National Collegiate Women's Ice Hockey Championship
- 2009–10 College Hockey America women's ice hockey season
- 2009-10 Western Collegiate Hockey Association women's ice hockey season
- 2009–10 NCAA Division I women's ice hockey season
- ECAC women's ice hockey
