= 2009–10 Wilfrid Laurier Golden Hawks women's hockey season =

Wilfrid Laurier Golden Hawks women's ice hockey season

OUA champions
- Conference: 1 OUA
- Home ice: Sunlife Financial Arena, Waterloo Recreation Complex

Record
- Overall: 26-0-1

Coaches and captains
- Head coach: Rick Osborne
- Assistant coaches: Jim Rayburn; Cindy Eadie
- Captain: Andrea Ironside

The 2009–10 Wilfrid Laurier Golden Hawks women's hockey team represented Wilfrid Laurier University in the 2009-10 Canadian Interuniversity Sport women's hockey season. The Golden Hawks were coached by Rick Osborne. Assisting Osborne was Jim Rayburn, Cindy Eadie, and Bruce Chapman. The Golden Hawks played home games at Sunlife Financial Arena. The Golden Hawks are a member of the Ontario University Athletics and attempted to win the Canadian Interuniversity Sport women's ice hockey championship.

== Offseason ==
- June 4, 2009: The end of the 2008-2009 women's hockey season saw the departures of seven of the program's players. The eight new recruits are Brittany Crago, Kristen Kilgallen, Paula LaGamba, Fiona Lester, Maureen Mommersteeg, Devon Skeats, Tori Skot and Candice Styles.
- September 3:The Wilfrid Laurier University women's hockey team will participate in an exhibition game against the women's Olympic Hockey team of China. The match will be played at the Waterloo Memorial Recreation Complex on Friday, October 9 at 7:30 p.m.

== Exhibition ==
Date	Opponent	Location	Score
9/24/2009	Toronto Jr. Aeros	Sunlife Financial Arena	Win, 2-0
9/26/2009	Ohio State	Columbus, Ohio	Tie, 1-1 (Ohio State scores in shootout)
9/27/2009	Robert Morris	Pittsburgh, Pennsylvania	RMU, 4-0
10/4/2009	Whitby Junior Wolves	Sunlife Financial Arena	Win, 8-1
10/9/2009	Chinese National Women's Team	Sunlife Financial Arena	Tie, 2-2
10/10/2009	Team Ontario Red Team	Sunlife Financial Arena	0-3
10/11/2009	Team Ontario Blue Team	Sunlife Financial Arena	4-2
1/1/2010	KW Junior Rangers	CIF Arena, Waterloo Tournament	4-3
1/1/2010	Bluewater Hawks Juniors	CIF Arena, Waterloo Tournament	7-1

== Roster ==
Number	Name	Position	Height
18	Laura Bartolini	Forward	5-4
15	Jessica Berrigan	Forward	5-8
1	Chelsey Clarke	Goalie	5-7
17	Stephanie Crarey	Defence	5-5
21	Daniela Di Felice	Forward/Defence	5-7
42	Heather Fortuna	Forward	5-7
66	Andrea Ironside	Forward	5-4
14	Candace Kellough	Forward	5-10
27	Liz Knox	Goalie	5-5
22	Alicia Martin	Forward	5-4
12	Caitlin Muirhead	Forward	5-5
16	Kaley Powers	Forward	5-7
11	Abby Rainsberry	Forward	5-2
2	Vanessa Schabkar	Centre	5-7
89	Katherine Shirriff	Centre	5-6
37	Alison Williams	Defence	5-9

== Regular season ==
- The Golden Hawks ranked second in the inaugural women's hockey coaches poll of the 2009-2010 season.

=== Standings ===
2009–10 OUA standings
	Conference						
	GP	W	L	OTL	PTS	GF	GA
Laurier	27	26	1	1	53	98	23
Queen's	27	19	8	3	41	93	63
York	27	17	10	1	35	78	61
Guelph	27	14	13	3	31	89	66
Toronto	27	14	13	2	30	89	89
Windsor	27	13	14	0	26	64	68
Brock	27	11	16	3	25	55	79
Western	27	10	17	3	23	66	87
Waterloo	27	7	20	3	17	49	90
UOIT	27	4	23	5	13	54	109

=== Schedule ===
Date	Opponent	Time	Location	Score
10/17/2009	Western	4:00 PM	Thompson Arena	8-0
10/18/2009	Windsor	4:10 PM	Windsor Arena	3-1
10/23/2009	Brock	7:30 PM	Seymour-Hannah Sports and Entertainment Centre	3-2
10/25/2009	Guelph	2:00 PM	Gryphon Centre	1-0
10/31/2009	Toronto	4:00 PM	Varsity Arena	6-0
11/1/2009	York	2:00 PM	Ice Gardens	3-2
11/7/2009	Queen's	7:30 PM	Sunlife Financial Arena	2-0
11/8/2009	UOIT	7:30 PM	Sunlife Financial Arena	5-1
11/14/2009	Waterloo	2:00 PM	CIF Arena	3-0
11/21/2009	Guelph	7:30 PM	Sunlife Financial Arena Recreation Complex	3-2
11/22/2009	Brock	7:30 PM	Sunlife Financial Arena	4-0
11/28/2009	Windsor	7:30 PM	Sunlife Financial Arena	1-0
11/29/2009	Western	7:30 PM	Sunlife Financial Arena	4-1
12/4/2009	Queen's	7:30 PM	Memorial Centre	3-0
12/5/2009	UOIT	7:30 PM	Campus Ice Centre	5-1
1/9/2010	York	7:30 PM	Sunlife Financial Arena	5-1
1/10/2010	Toronto	7:30 PM	Sunlife Financial Arena	1-0
1/16/2010	Waterloo	7:30 PM	Sunlife Financial Arena	4-1
1/17/2010	Waterloo	7:30 PM	Sunlife Financial Arena	9-0
1/23/2010	Western	3:00 PM	Sunlife Financial Arena	2-1
1/30/2010	Brock	7:30 PM	Seymour-Hannah Sports and Entertainment	3-0
1/31/2010	Guelph	2:00 PM	Gryphon Centre	2-1
2/6/2010	Toronto	4:00 PM	Varsity Arena	3-0
2/7/2010	York	2:00 PM	Ice Gardens	8-3
2/13/2010	Queen's	3:00 PM	Sunlife Financial Arena	4-3
2/14/2010	UOIT	4:00 PM	Sunlife Financial Arena	2-1
2/15/2010	Windsor		Sunlife Financial Arena	1-2

== Player stats ==
=== Skaters ===
Player	GP	Goals	Assists	Points	+/-	PIM
Andrea Ironside	27	17	13	30		40
Katherine Shirriff	27	9	15	24		30

=== Goaltenders ===
Player	Games played	Minutes	Goals Against	Wins	Losses	Ties	Shutouts	Save %	Goals Against Average
Liz Knox	25	1483	22	24	0	1		.960	0.89

== Postseason ==
=== CIS Tournament ===
Date	Opponent	Location	Time	Score

== Awards and honors ==
- Liz Knox, OUA Leader, Save Percentage
- CIS Tournament All-Star, Forward, Andrea Ironside
