= 2009–10 Ohio State Buckeyes women's ice hockey season =

- Conference: ECAC

Rankings
- USA Today/USA Hockey Magazine: Not ranked
- USCHO.com/CBS College Sports: Not ranked

Record
- Overall: 1-1-2

Coaches and captains
- Head coach: Jackie Barto

== Offseason ==
- July 16: Lisa Chesson, a former defenseman for Ohio State, has been invited to the 2009 USA Hockey Women's National Festival, Aug. 18–24 in Blaine, Minn. The National Team will compete in the Qwest Tour, a 10-game domestic tour that begins Sept. 25 and ends just prior to the start of the 2010 Olympic Winter Games in Vancouver, British Columbia.
- July 29: Ohio State women's hockey forward Laura McIntosh has managed to step away from the ice this summer. McIntosh is the third baseman for Team Ontario, made up of the best softball players in the province. The Waterloo native, who led the Buckeyes in points during her freshman season last year, is the only college-aged member of the team who doesn't play college softball.
- August 17: Natalie Spooner, earned a place on Canada's National Women's Under-22 Team for the second time in as many years.
- August 31: Four Buckeyes are on the top international teams in women's hockey are gathered in Vancouver, British Columbia. They will compete for the 2009 Hockey Canada Cup beginning Monday, with the gold medal game Sunday, Sept. 6. Three of the Buckeyes are former Ohio State defensemen: Tessa Bonhomme on Team Canada, Lisa Chesson on Team USA and Emma Laaksonen on Team Finland. Incoming freshman forward Minttu Tuominen is on Team Finland. The Hockey Canada Cup is being used as a test event for the Games.
- September 9: The WCHA announced that Ohio State defenseman Shannon Reilly and forwards Laura McIntosh and Natalie Spooner have been named as WCHA All-Stars. The three players are among 22 players from the conference to face the 2009-10 U.S. Women's National Team in St. Paul, Minn. on September 25.

== Exhibition ==
=== Schedule ===
Date	Opponent	Location	Time	Score
Sat, Sep 26	Wilfrid Laurier	Columbus, Ohio	7:07 p.m.	Tie, 1-1 (Ohio State scores in shootout)

== Regular season ==
- November 7: The Buckeyes moved into second place in the Western Collegiate Hockey Association standings after defeating North Dakota by a score of 3-1 at the Ralph Engelstad Arena.
- December 17:Lisa Chesson, a defenseman for the Ohio State women's hockey team from 2005-08, has been named to the U.S. Olympic Women's Team.
- December 22: Former Buckeye All-American Tessa Bonhomme, a defenseman for Ohio State from 2004-08, has been nominated to the Canadian National Women's Team for the 2010 Winter Olympic Games announced.

=== Standings ===
2009–10 Western Collegiate Hockey Association standings
	Conference								Overall					
	GP	W	L	T	SOW	PTS	GF	GA	GP	W	L	T	GF	GA
Minnesota Duluth†*	28	20	6	2	1	43	90	55	41	31	8	2	138	83
Minnesota†	28	18	6	4	3	43	91	49	40	26	9	5	129	74
St. Cloud State	28	11	11	6	4	32	70	77	37	15	14	8	96	103
Wisconsin	28	15	12	1	0	31	84	63	36	18	15	3	107	82
Ohio State	28	12	13	3	1	28	90	94	37	17	15	5	122	117
Bemidji State	28	9	12	7	3	28	47	64	38	12	19	7	65	98
Minnesota State	28	5	18	5	3	18	49	92	34	7	22	5	66	117
North Dakota	28	7	19	2	0	16	44	71	34	8	22	4	61	92
Championship: † indicates conference regular season champion; * indicates conference tournament champion Updated July 21, 2024

=== Roster ===
Number	Name	Position	Height	Class
33	Bilko, Barbara	G	5-5	So.
6	Bishop, Teal	D	5-7	Jr.
18	Boskovich, Amanda	F	5-4	Fr.
3	Carlson, Brittany	D	5-3	So.
27	Davis, Rachel	D	5-6	Sr.
34	Facklis, Deidre	G	5-8	Jr.
10	Feste, Melissa	F	5-3	So.
23	Hollowell, Tina	F	5-5	Fr.
7	Kilpatrick, Jenna	F	5-7	Jr.
31	Knapp, Chelsea	G	5-9	Fr.
12	Langan, Hokey	F	5-4	Fr.
28	LaRocque, Raelyn	F	5-6	Sr.
19	Mancuso, Christina	F	5-7	Jr.
11	McIntosh, Laura	F	5-4	So.
24	Nelson, Sandy	D	5-4	Jr.
9	Reilly, Shannon	D	5-5	Jr.
17	Rizzo, Liz	F	5-5	Fr.
25	Semenza, Paige	F	5-4	Fr.
5	Spooner, Natalie	F	5-10	So.
21	Theut, Kim	F	5-6	So.
14	Tonnessen, Michele	F	5-7	Sr.
15	Tuominen, Minttu	F	5-5	Fr.
8	Wild, Kelly	D	5-3	So.

=== Schedule ===
Date	Opponent	Location	Time	Score	Record
Fri, Oct 02	Boston University	at Boston, Mass.	7:00 p.m.	4-4	0-0-1
Sat, Oct 03	Boston University	at Boston, Mass.	3:00 p.m.	1-1	0-0-2
Fri, Oct 09	Minnesota *	Columbus, Ohio	7:07 p.m.	6-5	1-0-2
Sat, Oct 10	Minnesota *	Columbus, Ohio	7:07 p.m.	1-6	1-1-2
Fri, Oct 16	Bemidji State *	at Bemidji, Minn.	7:07 p.m.	5-2	2-1-2
Sat, Oct 17	Bemidji State *	at Bemidji, Minn.	2:07 p.m.	2-2 (Lost Shootout)	2-1-3
Fri, Oct 23	Wisconsin *	at Madison, Wis.	7:07 p.m.	4-3	3-1-3
Sat, Oct 24	Wisconsin *	at Madison, Wis.	7:07 p.m.	3-5	3-2-3
Fri, Oct 30	Minnesota State *	Columbus, Ohio	7:07 p.m.	7-6	4-2-3
Sat, Oct 31	Minnesota State *	Columbus, Ohio	7:07 p.m.	4-1	5-2-3
Fri, Nov 06	North Dakota *	at Grand Forks, N.D.	7:07 p.m.	4-5	5-3-3
Sat, Nov 07	North Dakota *	at Grand Forks, N.D.	4:07 p.m.	3-1	6-3-3
Fri, Nov 13	Minnesota Duluth *	Columbus, Ohio	7:07 p.m.	2-3 (OT)	6-4-3
Sat, Nov 14	Minnesota Duluth *	Columbus, Ohio	7:07 p.m.	3-5	6-5-3
Fri, Nov 20	St. Lawrence	Columbus, Ohio	7:07 p.m.		
Sat, Nov 21	St. Lawrence	Columbus, Ohio	2:07 p.m.		
Fri, Dec 11	St. Cloud State *	at St. Cloud, Minn.	2:07 p.m.		
Sat, Dec 12	St. Cloud State *	at St. Cloud, Minn.	1:07 p.m.		
Sat, Jan 02	Robert Morris	Columbus, Ohio	2:07 p.m.		
Sun, Jan 03	Robert Morris	Columbus, Ohio	2:07 p.m.		
Fri, Jan 08	Minnesota *	at Minneapolis, Minn.	6:07 p.m.		
Sat, Jan 09	Minnesota *	at Minneapolis, Minn.	4:07 p.m.		
Fri, Jan 15	Minnesota State *	at Mankato, Minn.	7:07 p.m.		
Sat, Jan 16	Minnesota State *	at Mankato, Minn.	3:07 p.m.		
Fri, Jan 22	Bemidji State *	Columbus, Ohio	7:07 p.m.	5-2	
Sat, Jan 23	Bemidji State *	Columbus, Ohio	2:07 p.m.	0-1	
Fri, Jan 29	Wisconsin *	Columbus, Ohio	7:07 p.m.	5-4	
Sat, Jan 30	Wisconsin *	Columbus, Ohio	3:07 p.m.	2-3	
Fri, Feb 05	North Dakota *	Columbus, Ohio	7:07 p.m.		
Sat, Feb 06	North Dakota *	Columbus, Ohio	4:07 p.m.		
Fri, Feb 12	Minnesota Duluth *	at Duluth, Minn.	7:07 p.m.		
Sat, Feb 13	Minnesota Duluth *	at Duluth, Minn.	6:07 p.m.		
Fri, Feb 19	St. Cloud State *	Columbus, Ohio	7:07 p.m.		
Sat, Feb 20	St. Cloud State *	Columbus, Ohio	2:07 p.m.		

=== Player performances ===
- In her junior season, Christina Mancuso had a career highs in points with ten (four goals and six assists). Nine of her points were against WCHA opponents (three goals, six assists). The Buckeyes won seven of the eight games in which Mancuso had a point . On October 16, Mancuso had the first multiple-point game of her career with two assists in 5-2 win at Bemidji State. The first shorthanded goal of her career was scored against the Robert Morris Colonials on January 2. January 15 was her second multi-point game as she scored a goal and assist in 6-0 shutout at Minnesota State.
- As a sophomore, Laura McIntosh played in all 37 games and led the team with 35 assists. It was the second-highest total in a season by a Buckeye. The 35 assists also led the entire WCHA. Her 45 points ranked second on the team in pointsShe had 11 multiple-point games and eight contests with multiple assists . On the power play, McIntosh collected 18 points, including 16 assists, for the second-most power play points on the Buckeyes . McIntosh carried an eight-game point streak into the 2010-11 season . In the NCAA, she ranked fifth in assists per game (0.95) and 19th in points per game (1.22). In WCHA conference games, her 37 points tied for third. In the first five games of the season, McIntosh had four assists. She factored into all three goals in 5-3 loss at Wisconsin on October 24. On October 30–31, the Buckeyes swept Minnesota State and McIntosh had a five-point series (1 goal, 4 assists).

== Player stats ==
= Indicates team leader

=== Skaters ===
Player	Games	Goals	Assists	Points	Points/game	PIM	GWG	PPG	SHG
Hokey Langan	37	25	28	53	1.4324	36	3	7	0
Laura McIntosh	37	10	35	45	1.2162	30	0	2	0
Natalie Spooner	35	22	22	44	1.2571	16	5	9	1
Raelyn LaRocque	37	12	24	36	0.9730	50	2	4	0
Rachel Davis	37	6	15	21	0.5676	56	0	1	0
Kelly Wild	36	5	16	21	0.5833	38	1	4	0
Melissa Feste	35	10	10	20	0.5714	22	1	2	0
Paige Semenza	34	4	9	13	0.3824	40	0	1	0
Kim Theut	32	7	5	12	0.3750	30	1	3	0
Minttu Tuominen	23	6	5	11	0.4783	8	1	2	0
Shannon Reilly	35	1	10	11	0.3143	36	0	0	0
Christina Mancuso	37	4	6	10	0.2703	22	1	0	1
Brittany Carlson	37	3	6	9	0.2432	26	1	0	0
Teal Bishop	37	3	5	8	0.2162	30	0	1	0
Sandy Nelson	37	1	3	4	0.1081	2	0	0	0
Tina Hollowell	37	1	3	4	0.1081	8	0	0	0
Jenna Kilpatrick	24	2	1	3	0.1250	2	1	0	0
Liz Rizzo	32	0	1	1	0.0313	0	0	0	0
Amanda Boskovich	26	0	0	0	0.0000	0	0	0	0
Chelsea Knapp	35	0	0	0	0.0000	4	0	0	0
Barbara Bilko	1	0	0	0	0.0000	0	0	0	0
Michele Tonnessen	21	0	0	0	0.0000	2	0	0	0
Deidre Facklis	3	0	0	0	0.0000	0	0	0	0

== Postseason ==
In the first game of the WCHA playoffs, Natalie Spooner scored all three goals for Ohio State. In the next game, Raelyn LaRocque would score the overtime winner as Ohio State swept Wisconsin.

=== WCHA playoffs ===
Date	Time	Opponent	Score	Notes
02/26/2010	7:00 PM	at Wisconsin	3-1	Natalie Spooner gets a hat trick
02/27/2010	7:00 PM	at Wisconsin	4-3 (OT)	Buckeyes win series 2-0

== Awards and honors ==
=== Preseason honors ===
- WCHA Preseason Player of the year finalist: Natalie Spooner, Ohio State
- WCHA Preseason Rookie of the year finalist: Hokey Langan, Ohio State

=== Regular season honors ===
- Chelsea Knapp, WCHA Defensive Player of the Week (Week of January 4)
- Raelyn LaRocque, WCHA Offensive Player of the Week (Week of November 9)
- Hokey Langan, WCHA Rookie of the Week (Week of November 2)
- Hokey Langan, WCHA Rookie of the Week (Week of January 25)
- Hokey Langan, WCHA Rookie of the Week (Week of February 17, 2010)
- Hokey Langan, WCHA Freshman of the Year
- Hokey Langan, WCHA Scoring Champion
- Natalie Spooner, WCHA Offensive Player of the Week (Week of January 20)
- Minttu Tuominen, WCHA Rookie of the Week (Week of October 19)

=== Post season honors ===
- Rachel Davis, 2010 Frozen Four Skills Competition participant
- Hokey Langan, Patty Kazmaier Award nominee
- Natalie Spooner, Patty Kazmaier Award nominee
- Kelly Wild, Big Ten Sportsmanship Award for the team (2009–10)

=== Academic honors ===
- Kelly Wild, WCHA All-Academic Team (2009–10)
- Kelly Wild, Academic All-Big Ten at-large selection (2009–10)
- Kelly Wild, Ohio State Scholar-Athlete (2009–10)

=== All-WCHA Team ===
- Natalie Spooner, All-WCHA First Team

=== Team awards ===
- Most Valuable Offensive player, Natalie Spooner
- Most Valuable Defensive player, Rachel Davis
- Most Valuable Freshman, Hokey Langan
- Most Improved Player, Paige Semenza
- Seventh Player award, Raelyn LaRocque
- Scarlet and Gray award, Raelyn LaRocque
- Team Academic award, Barbara Bilko
- Buckeye Power Club, Christina Mancuso

== See also ==
- 2009–10 Ohio State Buckeyes women's basketball team
