= 2009–10 Guelph Gryphons women's ice hockey season =

- Conference: OUA

Record

Coaches and captains
- Head coach: Rachel Flanagan

The Guelph Gryphons represented the University of Guelph in the 2009- 2010 Canadian Interuniversity Sport women's hockey season. The Gryphons attempted to win their first Canadian Interuniversity Sport women's ice hockey championship. Their head coach was Rachel Flanagan, assisted by Kirsten Thatcher and John Lovell.

== Offseason ==
- April 9: The Guelph Gryphon women's ice hockey team confirmed the addition of Mississauga native Jenna Lanzarotta. The forward participated with the Mississauga Jr. Chiefs in 2008-2009. She amassed 21 points (9 goals, 12 assists) in 33 games played while helping her team to a 2008-2009 provincial gold medal. She also participated in the Tier 2 girls Hockey ROPSSAA championship this year with her St. Marcellinus Spirit high school team. In addition, she was the hockey MVP for her high school.

== Exhibition ==
- Two of the Gryphons exhibition games involved NCAA teams.

Date	Opponent	Location	Time	Score
Sep 19, 2009	Carleton	Guelph	2:00 PM	Carleton, 2-1
Sep 20, 2009	Concordia	Guelph	2:00 PM	Guelph, 1-0
Sep 26, 2009	Mercyhurst	Mercyhurst	2:00 PM	Mercyhurst, 10-0
Sep 27, 2009	Syracuse	Syracuse	2:00 PM	Guelph, 3-1

== Regular season ==
- The Gryphons ranked seventh in the inaugural women's hockey coaches poll of the 2009-2010 season.

=== Roster ===
Number	Name	Position	Height	Year
1	Chelsey Roy	G	5'04"	4
2	Carla D'Angelo	D	5'10"	4
3	Jackie Sollis	D	5'08"	3
4	Stephanie Dykes	F	5'03"	3
5	Laura Milton	D	5'08"	2
6	Erin Small	F	5'05"	3
7	Tamara Bell	F	5'04"	2
9	Dayna Kanis	F	5'05"	4
10	Samantha Ryder	F	5'07"	2
11	Leslie Taylor	F	5'11"	2
12	Patricia "Rose" Harris	F	5'08"	4
13	Alix Mullin	D	5'06"	2
15	Tori Woods	F	5'08"	3
17	Jody Hodgins	D	5'07"	3
19	Sarah McClinchey	F	5'04"	4
20	Mary Darvill	F	5'02"	2
21	Rachel Driscoll	D	5'06"	3
22	Jessica Zerafa	F	5'07"	4
23	Jennifer Rivers	F	5'10"	3
24	Lucia Mazza	D	5'06"	3
29	Tayne Hewer	F	5'09"	3
31	Kanesa Shwetz	G	5'06"	4
33	Cassandra McNichol	G	5'10"	2

=== Schedule ===
Date	Opponent	Location	Time	Score
Oct 10, 2009	Windsor	Windsor	4:15 PM	W 4-1
Oct 11, 2009	Western	Western	2:00 PM	W 3-2
Oct 16, 2009	Queens	Queens	7:30 PM	L 4-6
Oct 17, 2009	UOIT	UOIT	7:30 PM	W 3-1
Oct 24, 2009	Waterloo	Guelph	2:00 PM	W 5-2
Oct 25, 2009	Laurier	Guelph	2:00 PM	L 0-1
Oct 30, 2009	Brock	Guelph	7:30 PM	
Nov 07, 2009	York	York	2:00 PM	
Nov 08, 2009	Toronto	Toronto	4:00 PM	
Nov 13, 2009	Windsor	Guelph	7:30 PM	L 2-3
Nov 14, 2009	Western	Guelph	7:30 PM	W 4-2
Nov 21, 2009	Laurier	Laurier	7:30 PM	L 2-3
Nov 22, 2009	Waterloo	Waterloo	2:00 PM	L 0-1
Nov 28, 2009	Toronto	Guelph	2:00 PM	W 7-2
Nov 29, 2009	York	Guelph	2:00 PM	W 3-2
Dec 03, 2009	Brock	Guelph	2:00 PM	W 10-2
Jan 07, 2010	UOIT Guelph	Guelph	2:00 PM	W 7-2
Jan 09, 2010	Queens	Guelph	7:30 PM	L 1-4
Jan 16, 2010	Western	Western	4:10 PM	W 5-4
Jan 17, 2010	Windsor	Windsor	4:10 PM	L 2-3
Jan 23, 2010	UOIT	UOIT	3:30 PM	W 6-2
Jan 24, 2010	Queens	Queens	4:10 PM	W 4-0
Jan 30, 2010	Waterloo	Guelph	2:00 PM	W 4-2
Jan 31, 2010	Laurier	Guelph	2:00 PM	L 1-2
Feb 05, 2010	Brock	Brock	4:10 PM	L 2-3
Feb 13, 2010	York	Guelph	2:00 PM	W 1-0
Feb 14, 2010	Toronto	Guelph	2:00 PM	L 1-4

=== Tournaments ===
- Guelph participated in the Concordia Tournament from December 28–30.

Date	Opponent	Location	Time	Score
Dec 28, 2009	TBA	Concordia University	1:00 PM	
Dec 29, 2009	McGill	Concordia University	6:00 PM	1-8
Dec 30, 2009	TBA	Concordia University	1:00 PM	

== Player stats ==
=== Skaters ===
Player	Goals	Assists	Points	Shots	+/-	PIM

=== Goaltenders ===
Player	Games Played	Minutes	Goals Against	Wins	Losses	Ties	Shutouts	Save %	Goals Against Average
Chelsey Roy									
Kanesa Shwetz									

== Postseason ==
=== CIS Tournament ===
Date	Opponent	Location	Time	Score
Feb 20, 2010	Toronto	Guelph	2:00 PM	W 1-0
Feb 25, 2010	Queens	Game 1, Kingston	2:00 PM	W 7-4
Feb 27, 2010	Queens	Game 2, Guelph	2:00 PM	W 5-2
Mar 4, 2010	Laurier	Game 1, Waterloo	2:00 PM	L 0-2
Mar 6, 2010	Laurier	Game 2, Guelph	2:00 PM	L 1-2
