= 2009–10 Wayne State Warriors women's ice hockey season =

- Conference: CHA

Rankings
- USA Today/USA Hockey Magazine: not ranked
- USCHO.com/CBS College Sports: not ranked

Record
- Overall: 19–18–4
- Home: 3–8–2
- Road: 6–10–2
- Neutral: 0-0-0

Coaches and captains
- Head coach: Jim Fetter
- Assistant coaches: Nicolette Franck; Allison Rutledge

The head coach of the Warriors is Jim Fetter. Assisting Fetter are Nicolette Franck and Allison Rutledge. The equipment manager is Jim Campbell, and the assistant Athletic Trainer is Amanda Riesterer.

== Offseason ==
- June 3, 2009: Two additional prospective student-athletes have signed National Letters of Intent to enroll at WSU this fall and join the Warrior hockey program. Lauren Lovold played with the Mississauga Jr. Chiefs in 2008–09 and Jaclyn Stapleton, a Westbank, British Columbia native, trained at the Pursuit of Excellence Hockey Academy last season.
- June 11, 2009: Wayne State University women's hockey student-athlete Lindsay DiPietro has been voted to the 2009 CoSIDA/ESPN The Magazine Academic All-America Women's At-Large University Division Third Team.
- June 24, 2009: Wayne State University head women's hockey coach Jim Fetter has been selected as an assistant coach for Canada's National Women's Under-22 Team in announcement last week by Hockey Canada. Fetter will serve as an assistant to Margot Page, the former head coach at Niagara University. The 2009–10 season marks the second in a row for Jim Fetter with the National Women's Under-22 Team

Chelsea Burnett enters the 2009–10 season as Wayne State's all-time leader in career points (53), goals (13), assists (40), CHA points (24) and CHA assists (19) by a defenseman.

- Sept 17: Wayne State has been predicted to finish third in the College Hockey America Preseason Coaches’ Poll, released Sept. 17 by CHA league officials.

== Exhibition ==
Date	Opponent	Location	Time	Score
Fri. Sept. 25	York University	Detroit, Mich.	7:00 pm	3–2

== Regular season ==
- Oct 3: Wayne State skated to only its second scoreless tie in ten years. Delayne Brian earned her second career shutout and had 37 saves.
- January 30: Wayne State University's women's hockey program officially celebrates its 10th Anniversary on January 30–31. At the City Sports Center, the 2009–10 Warriors (8–11–3, 4–4–0 CHA) will host the Syracuse Orange (13–12–1, 4–4–0 CHA) in a College Hockey America series.

=== Standings ===
2009–10 College Hockey America standings
	Overall							Conference					
	GP	W	L	T	PTS	GF	GA	GP	W	L	T	GF	GA
x, y: Mercyhurst	23	19	1	3	41	0	0	7	6	0	1	0	0
Syracuse	26	13	12	1	27	0	0	8	4	4	0	0	0
Wayne State	22	8	11	3	19	0	0	8	4	4	0	0	0
Niagara	22	8	10	4	20	0	0	8	3	3	2	0	0
Robert Morris	25	7	17	1	15	0	0	7	0	6	1	0	0

x: Regular season champion, y: Postseason champion

=== Roster ===
Number	Name	Position	Height	Class	Shoots
1	Delayne Brian	Goalie	5–9	SO/1L	Left
4	Chelsea Burnett	Defense	5–5	SR/3L	Left
5	Lauren Lovold	Defense	5–9	FR	Left
6	Brandi Frakie	Forward	5–5	SR/3L	Right
7	Christine Jefferson	Defense	5–6	SR/3L	Left
8	Micheline Frappier	Forward	5–5	SO/1L	Right
9	Gina Buquet	Forward	5–4	FR	Right
10	Marlee Fisher	Defense	5–7	SO/1L	Left
12	Jill Szandzik	Defense	5–8	SO/1L	Left
14	Lauren Ragen	Forward	5–7 RS	SO	Right
15	Katrina Protopapas	Forward	5–6	SR/3L	Left
17	Veronique Laramee-Paquette	Forward	5–8	SO/1L	Left
18	Jenaya Townsend	Defense	5–9	FR	Left
19	Julie Hébert	Forward	5–8	FR	Left
20	Alyssa Baldin	Forward	5–5	SO/1L	Right
22	Julie Ingratta	Forward	5–9	FR	Right
23	Jaclyn Stapleton	Forward	5–7	FR	Right
24	Ciara Lee	Defense	5–11	SO/1L	Right
26	Adrianna Pfeffer	Forward	5–7	JR/2L	Right
27	Lauren Coxon	Forward	5–8	FR	Left
30	Lindsey Park	Goalie	5–10 RS	SR/1L	Left
31	Brittany Zeches	Goalie	5–2	SO/1L	Left

=== Schedule ===
Date	Opponent	Location	Time	Score	Record
Fri., Oct. 2	at Rensselaer	Troy, N.Y.	7:00 p.m. ET	2–3	0–1–0
Sat., Oct. 3	at Rensselaer	Troy, N.Y.	3:00 p.m. ET	0–0	0–1–1
Fri., Oct. 16	vs. Boston University	Detroit, Mich.	7:00 p.m. ET	4–4	0–1–2
Sat., Oct. 17	vs. Boston University	Detroit, Mich.	4:00 p.m. ET	2–4	0–2–2
Fri., Oct. 23	at Colgate	Hamilton, N.Y.	7:00 p.m. ET		
Sat., Oct. 24	at Colgate	Hamilton, N.Y.	2:00 p.m. ET		
Fri., Oct. 30	at Bemidji State	Bemidji, Minn.	8:00 p.m. ET	1–3	
Sat., Oct. 31	at Bemidji State	Bemidji, Minn.	3:00 p.m. ET	6–1	
Fri., Nov. 6	vs. Mercyhurst *	Detroit, Mich.	7:00 p.m. ET	1–3	
Sat., Nov. 7	vs. Mercyhurst *	Detroit, Mich.	2:00 p.m. ET	2–7	
Thu., Nov. 12	at Wisconsin	Madison, Wis.	8:00 p.m. ET	2–2	
Fri., Nov. 13	at Wisconsin	Madison, Wis.	3:00 p.m. ET	2–6	
Fri., Dec. 4	at Syracuse *	Syracuse, N.Y.	7:00 p.m. ET		
Sat., Dec. 5	at Syracuse *	Syracuse, N.Y.	2:00 p.m. ET		
Sat., Dec. 12	at Niagara *	Niagara University, N.Y.	2:00 p.m. ET		
Sun., Dec. 13	at Niagara *	Niagara University, N.Y.	1:00 p.m. ET		
Fri., Jan. 8	vs. Vermont	Detroit, Mich.	7:00 p.m. ET	5–2	
Sat., Jan. 9	vs. Vermont	Detroit, Mich.	2:00 p.m. ET	1–2	
Fri., Jan. 15	vs. Robert Morris *	Detroit, Mich.	7:00 p.m. ET		
Sat., Jan. 16	vs. Robert Morris *	Detroit, Mich.	2:00 p.m. ET		
Fri., Jan. 22	at Quinnipiac	Hamden, Conn.	4:00 p.m. ET		
Sat., Jan. 23	at Quinnipiac	Hamden, Conn.	4:00 p.m. ET		
Fri., Jan. 29	vs. Syracuse *	Detroit, Mich.	7:00 p.m. ET		
Sat., Jan. 30	vs. Syracuse *	Detroit, Mich.	2:00 p.m. ET		
Fri., Feb. 12	vs. Niagara *	Detroit, Mich.	7:00 p.m. ET		
Sat., Feb. 13	vs. Niagara *	Detroit, Mich.	2:00 p.m. ET		
Fri., Feb. 19	at Mercyhurst *	Erie, Pa.	4:00 p.m. ET		
Sat., Feb. 20	at Mercyhurst *	Erie, Pa.	2:00 p.m. ET		
Fri., Feb. 26	at Robert Morris *	Moon Twp., Pa.	7:00 p.m. ET		
Sat., Feb. 27	at Robert Morris *	Moon Twp., Pa.	7:00 p.m. ET		
Thu., Mar. 4	CHA Quarterfinals	Detroit, Mich.	TBA		

== Player stats ==
= Indicates team leader

=== Skaters ===
Player	Games	Goals	Assists	Points	Points/game	PIM	GWG	PPG	SHG
Alyssa Baldin	31	9	11	20	0.6452	24	0	4	1
Katrina Protopapas	31	13	4	17	0.5484	14	1	9	0
Julie Ingratta	30	6	9	15	0.5000	24	1	0	0
Gina Buquet	31	6	8	14	0.4516	34	1	2	1
Veronique Laramee-Paquette	25	5	7	12	0.4800	43	3	2	1
Jill Szandzik	31	3	9	12	0.3871	24	0	1	0
Lauren Ragen	29	3	8	11	0.3793	14	0	1	0
Chelsea Burnett	31	4	5	9	0.2903	10	1	2	1
Micheline Frappier	27	4	3	7	0.2593	20	2	0	0
Jenaya Townsend	29	1	6	7	0.2414	24	0	0	0
Adrianna Pfeffer	29	2	4	6	0.2069	14	0	0	0
Julie Hebert	27	1	4	5	0.1852	0	0	0	0
Christine Jefferson	31	0	5	5	0.1613	14	0	0	0
Jaclyn Stapleton	31	1	2	3	0.0968	2	0	0	0
Julie Hebert	3	2	0	2	0.6667	10	0	0	0
Ciara Lee	31	1	0	1	0.0323	8	0	0	0
Lauren Coxon	31	0	1	1	0.0323	20	0	0	0
Delayne Brian	19	0	1	1	0.0526	2	0	0	0
Brittany Zeches	1	0	0	0	0.0000	0	0	0	0
Lindsey Park	13	0	0	0	0.0000	0	0	0	0
Lauren Lovold	27	0	0	0	0.0000	20	0	0	0

=== Goaltenders ===
Player	Games Played	Minutes	Goals Against	Wins	Losses	Ties	Shutouts	Save %	Goals Against Average
Delayne Brian									
Lindsey Park									
Brittany Zeches									

== Postseason ==
Lindsey Park has been selected to participate in the Frozen Four Skills Competition to be held on April 4 at Ford Field.

== Awards and honors ==
- CHA Defensive Player of the Week, Chelsea Burnett (Week of December 7)
- CHA Defensive Player of the Week, Chelsea Burnett (Week of March 1)
- CHA Defensive Player of the Week, Jill Szandzik (Week of January 11)
- CHA Defensive Player of the Week, Delayne Brian (Week of January 19)
- CHA Offensive Player of the Week, Katrina Protopapas (Week of October 19)
- CHA Rookie of the Week, Gina Buquet (Week of November 16)
- CHA Rookie of the Week, Julie Ingratta (Week of January 18)
- CHA Student-Athlete of the Year – Christine Jefferson

=== Pre-Season All-CHA Team ===
- D — Chelsea Burnett, WSU (tie)

=== Second Team All-CHA ===
- Veronique Laramee-Paquette, Second Team All-CHA
- Jill Szandzik, Second Team All-CHA

=== CHA All-Rookie Team ===
- Jenaya Townend, D, Wayne State

== See also ==
- 2009–10 College Hockey America women's ice hockey season
