= 2009–10 Mercyhurst Lakers women's ice hockey season =

CHA regular season champions CHA Tournament champions NCAA Frozen Four, Loss, Semifinal, 2-3 (OT) vs. Cornell
- Conference: CHA
- Home ice: Mercyhurst Ice Center

Rankings
- USA Today/USA Hockey Magazine: 3
- USCHO.com/CBS College Sports: 1

Record
- Overall: 19-1-3
- Home: 3-1-0
- Road: 6-0-0

Coaches and captains
- Head coach: Michael Sisti
- Captain: Vicki Bendus

The 2009–10 Mercyhurst Lakers women's ice hockey team represented Mercyhurst College in the 2009–10 NCAA Division I women's ice hockey season. The Lakers were coached by Michael Sisti. Assisting Sisti are Paul Colontino and Louis Goulet. Mike Folga was the Head Equipment Manager. The Lakers will attempt to qualify for the NCAA Women's Frozen Four for the second consecutive season. Vicki Bendus, Bailey Bram and Jesse Scanzano were all Top-10 finalists for the Patty Kazmaier Award. This marked only the third time in NCAA history (Harvard: 1999, Wisconsin: 2009) that one school had three nominees in the Top 10. Bendus was honoured with the award.

== Offseason ==
- July 31: Mercyhurst College women’s hockey alumna Valerie Chouinard has been selected as the College Hockey America nominee for the NCAA Woman of the Year. The NCAA Woman of the Year Award honors senior women student-athletes who have excelled in the areas of academic achievement, athletics, service and leadership.
- August 11: Sophomore Bailey Bram helped Team Canada White defeat Sweden by a score of 4-0. The 2009 College Hockey America Rookie of the Year scored 1:43 into the third period to extend Team White’s advantage to 2-0. It was her first goal as a member of the Canadian Under-22 program.
- August 17: Three current players and an alumna of the Mercyhurst College women’s hockey team have been selected to the 2009-10 Canadian National Women’s Under-22 Team. Juniors Vicki Bendus and Jesse Scanzano, sophomore Bailey Bram and 2008 graduate Laura Mosier will make up part of the 23-player roster that is set to compete against the Canadian National Team.
- August 21: The Canadian National Team closed out its three-game series against the under-22 squad with a 10-0 victory. Mercyhurst star Meghan Agosta recorded two goals and an assist, joining Hayley Wickenheiser, Marie-Philip Poulin and Rebecca Johnston as National Team members with at least two goals in the game.
- September 17: The Mercyhurst College women’ hockey team has been predicted to finish first in the College Hockey America Preseason Coaches’ Poll, released by CHA league officials. Mercyhurst claimed four of five possible first-place votes (Wayne State had one) and 16 points to earn the top ranking for the eighth-straight season. In addition to the poll, five Lakers were named to the Preseason All-CHA Team. Junior Jesse Scanzano, was also tabbed as Preseason CHA Player of the Year. Junior Vicki Bendus and third-year forward Scanzano earned two of the forward honors outright, while sophomore Bailey Bram tied for the third and final slot. Junior Ashley Cockell joined classmate Melissa Lacroix on defense. Sophomore Hillary Pattenden completed the team in a tie for best goaltender.

== Exhibition ==
Date	Opponent	Location	Time	Score
9/25/2009	Vaughan Flames	Erie, Pa.	TBA	10-0
9/26/2009	Guelph	Erie, Pa.	2:00 p.m.	Mercyhurst, 10-0

== Regular season ==
- October 5: The Lakers have been ranked as the national No. 1 team, USCHO.com officials revealed in their first Top-10 Women’s Hockey Poll of the season. The Lakers accumulated 140 points and eight first-place votes to earn top billing in the national poll.
- October 17: Vicki Bendus scored a season-high four points in the first period. Sophomore Hillary Pattenden made a season-high 32 saves in the game.
- October 31: No. 1 ranked Mercyhurst College suffered its first loss of the season. Fifth-ranked Minnesota Duluth skated away to a 4-3 win and a split of the two-game series at the Mercyhurst Ice Center. With the loss, the Lakers fall to 7-1 on the season.
- December 6: The Robert Morris vs. Mercyhurst game on Sunday, December 6 at 1:00 p.m. has been postponed due to a water main break at the Mercyhurst Ice Center. The game is rescheduled for Tuesday, February 2 at 7:00 p.m.
- December 12: Jesse Scanzano scored three goals in the third period to lead Mercyhurst College women’s hockey team over No. 10 St. Lawrence, 6-2. One of those goals was the 50th goal of her career.
- December 22: Mercyhurst College forward Meghan Agosta was one of 21 players nominated to represent Canada’s Women’s National Team at the 2010 Olympic Winter Games in Vancouver, B.C.
- January 4: Juniors Vicki Bendus and Jesse Scanzano, and sophomore Bailey Bram will play for the Canadian National Under-22 Team at the 2010 MLP Cup, Jan. 5 – 9, in Ravensburg, Germany.
- January 10:Junior Vicki Bendus scored a goal and added two assists for the Canadian National Women’s Under-22 Team in the gold medal game of the 2010 MLP Cup. Canada defeated Switzerland, 9-0 in Ravensburg, Germany. The Canadian team won all four of their games by a combined score of 24-4, and secured their seventh goal medal in the past eight years. Junior Jesse Scanzano and sophomore Bailey Bram each added a goal and an assist. In three games, the Mercyhurst trio combined for seven goals and 18 points. Bendus and Bram tied for the tournament lead with seven points each. Bendus was named the tournament's top forward.
- January 23–24: Hillary Pattenden earned both victories in the Lakers' two victories against Syracuse. She allowed just a power-play goal on Friday, while turning aside 20 Orange shots. With the score knotted at one on Saturday, Pattenden did not allow a goal for nearly 40 minutes as Mercyhurst built up a 4-1 advantage. The Lakers limited SU, the second-best power play in the league, to just two goals in 15 opportunities.
- January 27: The Lakers have headed the USA TODAY/USA Hockey Magazine poll for fourteen consecutive weeks and are the unanimous choice with all 19 first-place votes for the eighth time.
- January 30: Niagara became only the second team all year, and the first in the CHA team to defeat Mercyhurst. The Purple Eagles defeated the Lakers 2-1. Jenni Bauer stopped 44 of 45 shots, including all 19 fired her way in the second period in what was a scoreless game until the 42nd minute. The victory was the first-ever for the Purple Eagles over a top-ranked team and their first over the Lakers since 2004. The result snapped Mercyhurst's nation-leading 16-game unbeaten streak and 26-game CHA unbeaten run.
- February 17: Vicki Bendus, Bailey Bram and Jesse Scanzano among 45 nominees for the Patty Kazmaier Memorial Award.
- March 4: Vicki Bendus was named College Hockey America Player of the Year. She was given the honour at the 2010 CHA Tournament Banquet, at Ford Field in Detroit. Bendus, was also named a First Team All-CHA honoree. Other Lakers to be named as First Team All-CHA selections included Jesse Scanzano, Melissa Lacroix, Cassea Schols, and Bailey Bram. Samantha Watt landed a spot on the All-CHA Rookie Team.

=== Standings ===
2009–10 College Hockey America standings
	Overall							Conference					
	GP	W	L	T	PTS	GF	GA	GP	W	L	T	GF	GA
x, y: Mercyhurst	23	19	1	3	41	0	0	7	6	0	1	0	0
Syracuse	26	13	12	1	27	0	0	8	4	4	0	0	0
Wayne State	22	8	11	3	19	0	0	8	4	4	0	0	0
Niagara	22	8	10	4	20	0	0	8	3	3	2	0	0
Robert Morris	25	7	17	1	15	0	0	7	0	6	1	0	0

x: Regular season champion, y: Postseason champion

=== Roster ===
Number	Name	Height	Position	Shoots	Class
1	Kelci Lanthier	5-5	G		Fr.
2	Samantha Watt	5-10	D		Fr.
4	Pamela Zgoda	5-6	D	R	So.
6	Johanna Malmstrom	5-8	D	L	Sr.
7	Jessica Christofferson	5-8	F		Fr.
8	Melissa Lacroix	5-9	D	R	Jr.
9	Kelley Steadman	5-11	F	R	So.
10	Lauren Jones	5-7	F		Fr.
11	Vicki Bendus	5-1	F	R	Jr.
13	Bailey Bram	5-7	F	L	So.
15	Anna Johnson	5-11	D	L	So.
16	Kylie Rossler	5-6	F	R	Jr.
19	Stephanie DeSutter	5-9	D	L	Fr.
20	Meghan Corbett	5-6	F	R	So.
21	Ashley Cockell	5-8	D	R	Jr.
22	Jess Jones	5-4	F	L	So.
23	Jesse Scanzano	6-0	F	R	Jr.
27	Julie Hersey	5-8	F	R	So.
28	Cassea Schols	5-9	D	R	Jr.
30	Hillary Pattenden	5-6	G	L	So.
35	Stephanie Ciampa	5-6	G		Fr.

=== Schedule ===
The Lakers will compete in the Easton Holiday Showcase to be held on January 2 and 3. Overall, the club will play 32 games against teams representing three different conferences this season. 10 games come against teams from the Eastern College Athletic Conference (ECAC), while six others represent contests against foes from the Western Collegiate Hockey Association (WCHA). The remaining 16 games are set aside for College Hockey America (CHA) teams.

Date	Opponent	Location	Time	Score	Record
10/2/2009	Bemidji State	Erie, Pa.	7:00 p.m.	4-1	1-0
10/3/2009	Bemidji State	Erie, Pa.	2:00 p.m.	6-1	2-0
10/16/2009	Rensselaer	Troy, N.Y.	7:00 p.m.	1-0	3-0
10/17/2009	Rensselaer	Troy, N.Y.	3:00 p.m.	5-1	4-0
10/23/2009	Cornell	Ithaca, N.Y.	7:00 p.m.	1-0	5-0
10/24/2009	Cornell	Ithaca, N.Y.	2:00 p.m.	5-1	6-0
10/30/2009	Minnesota Duluth	Erie, Pa.	7:00 p.m.	5-2	7-0
10/31/2009	Minnesota Duluth	Erie, Pa.	3:00 p.m.	3-4	7-1
11/6/2009	Wayne State	Detroit, Mich.	7:00 p.m.	3-1	8-1
11/7/2009	Wayne State	Detroit, Mich.	2:00 p.m.	7-2	9-1
11/20/2009	Niagara	Niagara University, N.Y.	7:00 p.m.	2-2	9-1-1
11/21/2009	Niagara	Niagara University, N.Y.	2:00 p.m.	2-0	10-1-1
11/27/2009	Colgate	Erie, Pa.	7:00 p.m.	8-3	11-1-1
11/28/2009	Colgate	Erie, Pa.	2:00 p.m.	8-2	12-1-1
12/5/2009	Robert Morris	Erie, Pa.	2:00 p.m.	6-2	13-1-1
12/6/2009	Robert Morris	Erie, Pa.	1:00 p.m.	Postponed	13-1-1
12/11/2009	St. Lawrence	Canton, N.Y.	7:00 p.m.	4-2	14-1-1
12/12/2009	St. Lawrence	Canton, N.Y.	3:00 p.m.	6-2	15-1-1
1/2/2010	Minnesota State - Mankato	St. Cloud, Minn.	1:07 p.m.	8-2	16-1-1
1/3/2010	St. Cloud State	St. Cloud, Minn.	4:07 p.m.	4-4	16-1-2
1/15/2010	Clarkson	Erie, Pa.	7:00 p.m.		
1/16/2010	Clarkson	Erie, Pa.	2:00 p.m.		
1/22/2010	Syracuse	Syracuse, N.Y.	7:00 p.m.		
1/23/2010	Syracuse	Syracuse, N.Y.	2:00 p.m.		
1/29/2010	Niagara	Erie, Pa.	7:00 p.m.		
1/30/2010	Niagara	Erie, Pa.	2:00 p.m.		
2/5/2010	Robert Morris	Pittsburgh, Pa.	7:05 p.m.		
2/6/2010	Robert Morris	Pittsburgh, Pa.	7:05 p.m.		
2/19/2010	Wayne State	Erie, Pa.	4:00 p.m.		
2/20/2010	Wayne State	Erie, Pa.	2:00 p.m.		
2/26/2010	Syracuse	Erie, Pa.	7:00 p.m.		
2/27/2010	Syracuse	Erie, Pa.	2:00 p.m.		
3/4/2010	TBA	Detroit, Mich.	TBA		

== Player stats ==
= Indicates team leader

=== Skaters ===
Player	Games	Goals	Assists	Points	Points/game	PIM	GWG	PPG	SHG
Vicki Bendus	36	28	37	65	1.8056	32	5	8	5
Jesse Scanzano	33	20	45	65	1.9697	72	3	6	4
Bailey Bram	33	29	27	56	1.6970	50	9	13	5
Jess Jones	36	20	26	46	1.2778	28	2	6	3
Ashley Cockell	36	21	22	43	1.1944	72	3	5	2
Kelley Steadman	36	15	13	28	0.7778	54	5	3	2
Melissa Lacroix	36	6	21	27	0.7500	50	1	2	0
Cassea Schols	36	5	22	27	0.7500	30	0	4	0
Lauren Jones	35	8	7	15	0.4286	8	0	1	0
Samantha Watt	34	2	12	14	0.4118	54	1	1	0
Pamela Zgoda	36	2	8	10	0.2778	2	0	0	0
Kylie Rossler	31	5	3	8	0.2581	26	0	0	0
Meghan Corbett	34	3	5	8	0.2353	6	0	1	0
Kyleigh Palmer	34	1	7	8	0.2353	14	0	0	0
Jessica Christofferson	33	1	3	4	0.1212	14	0	1	0
Stephanie DeSutter	33	1	2	3	0.0909	12	1	0	0
Johanna Malmstrom	35	1	0	1	0.0286	16	0	0	0
Hillary Pattenden	35	0	1	1	0.0286	2	0	0	0
Anna Johnson	26	0	0	0	0.0000	0	0	0	0
Julie Hersey	31	0	0	0	0.0000	6	0	0	0
Stephanie Ciampa	6	0	0	0	0.0000	0	0	0	0

=== Goaltenders ===
Player	Games Played	Minutes	Goals Against	Wins	Losses	Ties	Shutouts	Save %	Goals Against Average
Kelci Lanthier	0	0	0	0	0	0	0	.000	0.00
Hillary Pattenden	10	597:59	14	9	1	0	1	.935	1.40
Stephanie Ciampa	0	0	0	0	0	0	0	.000	0.00

19 seconds was open net time

=== Team leaders ===
- Game Winning Goals: Bailey Bram, 4 goals
- Power Play points: Cassea Schols, 7 points
- Power Play goals: Bailey Bram, 3 goals
- Short handed goals: Vicki Bendus, 2 goals
- Shots on Net, Vicki Bendus, 53 shots
- Shot Percentage, .238 (5 goals on 21 shots)

== Postseason ==
=== NCAA Hockey tournament ===
- March 13: Bailey Bram scored two goals, including the game winner as the Lakers beat Boston University by a score of 4-1 in the NCAA Regionals.
- March 13: Vicki Bendus scored the 50th career goal of her career in the win over the Terriers. She is now the 8th Laker to have at least 50 goals in a career.

== See also ==
- 2009–10 College Hockey America women's ice hockey season

== Awards and honors ==
- Vicki Bendus, CHA Player of the Week (October 6)
- Vicki Bendus, CHA Player of the Week (November 30)
- Vicki Bendus, CHA Player of the Week (January 4)
- Vicki Bendus, CHA Player of the Week (January 18)
- Vicki Bendus, CHA Player of the Year
- Vicki Bendus, NCAA Elite 88 Award (awarded to student-athlete with the highest grade point average participating at an NCAA Championship event)
- Vicki Bendus, 2010 Patty Kazmaier Award
- Bailey Bram, CHA Player of the Week (October 26)
- Bailey Bram, CHA Player of the Week (December 7)
- Bailey Bram, CHA Offensive Player of the Week (Week of February 8)
- Bailey Bram, CHA All-Tournament Team
- Ashley Cockell, Most Valuable Player, CHA Tournament
- Jess Jones, CHA Player of the Week (Week of March 1)
- Lauren Jones, CHA Rookie of the Week (December 14)
- Lauren Jones, CHA Rookie of the Week (January 4)
- Melissa Lacroix selected Defensive Player of the Week (Week of February 8)
- Melissa Lacroix, CHA All-Tournament Team
- Hillary Pattenden, CHA Defensive Player of the Week (October 19)
- Hillary Pattenden, CHA Defensive Player of the Week (January 4)
- Hillary Pattenden, CHA Defensive Player of the Week (January 25)
- Hillary Pattenden, CHA Defensive Player of the Week (February 23)
- Jesse Scanzano, CHA Player of the Week (November 9)
- Jesse Scanzano, CHA All-Tournament Team
- Hillary Steadman, CHA Player of the Week, (Week of November 23)
- Kelley Steadman, CHA Player of the Week (Week of February 23)
- Samantha Watt, CHA All-Rookie Team

=== Pre-Season All-CHA Team ===
- F - Vicki Bendus
- F - Jesse Scanzano
- F - Bailey Bram, (tie)
- D - Ashley Cockell
- D - Melissa Lacroix, (tie)
- G - Hillary Pattenden, (tie)
- Player of the Year - Jesse Scanzano

=== All-CHA First Team ===
- F - Vicki Bendus
- F - Jesse Scanzano
- F - Bailey Bram
- D- Melissa Lacroix, First Team All-CHA
- D- Cassea Schols, First Team All-CHA

=== All-America selections ===
- Vicki Bendus, 2010 Women's RBK Hockey Division I All-America First Team
- Jesse Scanzano, 2010 Women's RBK Hockey Division I All-America Second Team

=== Postseason ===
- April 25: The Mercyhurst College women’s hockey team were honored by the Erie Storm, prior to their game against the Reading Express at Louis J. Tullio Arena.
- June 10: Vicki Bendus was named a First Team CoSIDA / ESPN The Magazine Academic All-American
