= 2008–09 College Hockey America women's ice hockey season =

In the 2008–09 season, Syracuse University joined the conference. The Mercyhurst Lakers were both the CHA regular-season and tournament champions. The Lakers were 16–0–0 in conference play.

== News and notes ==
- With the addition of the Syracuse Orange women's ice hockey program, the conference schedule increased to 16 games (four games each against the other four schools). In addition, the conference tournament expanded to three days.

== Players ==
- Mercyhurst Lakers player and Olympic gold medallist Meghan Agosta was acknowledged as CHA Player of the Year. Agosta led the NCAA in points per game (2.44), goals per game (1.28), assists per game (1.16) and game-winning goals (10).
- Wayne State Warriors defender Natalie Payne tied for the NCAA lead in points per game by a defender. She registered 32 points in 32 contests.

== Schools ==
=== Niagara ===
Margot Page would be in her final year as head coach.

== Postseason ==
=== CHA tournament ===
The Mercyhurst Lakers were the CHA tournament champions. In the semifinals, the Lakers disposed of Niagara by an 8–2 mark. In the final, the Lakers defeated Wayne State by a 6–1 score. The tournament was played in Erie, Pennsylvania.

=== NCAA tournament ===
- In the NCAA quarterfinals, the Lakers defeated the St. Lawrence Skating Saints women's ice hockey program, 3–1. With the victory, Mercyhurst College qualified for the NCAA Frozen Four. In the semifinals, the Lakers beat the Minnesota Golden Gophers women's ice hockey program by a 5–4 score. In the process, the Lakers became the first CHA member to reach the national title game. They challenged the Wisconsin Badgers women's ice hockey program in the NCAA national championship game. The Lakers outshot the Badgers 37–32, but were defeated 5–0.

== See also ==
- National Collegiate Women's Ice Hockey Championship
