= 2009–10 Syracuse Orange women's ice hockey season =

- Conference: 3 CHA
- Home ice: Tennity Ice Pavilion

Rankings
- USA Today/USA Hockey Magazine: 10
- USCHO.com/CBS College Sports: Not ranked

Record
- Overall: 18–17–1
- Home: 6–2–0
- Road: 5–5–1

Coaches and captains
- Head coach: Paul Flanagan
- Assistant coaches: Erin O'Brien; Graham Thomas
- Captain: Julie Rising
- Alternate captain: Janelle Malcolm

The head coach is Paul Flanagan. Assisting Flanagan are Erin O'Brien and Graham Thomas. The Orange finished third in the College Hockey America regular season standings. The Orange qualified for the finals of the College Hockey American women's tournament but were ousted by the Mercyhurst Lakers.

== Offseason ==
- Sept 17: Syracuse has been predicted to finish fourth in the College Hockey America Preseason Coaches’ Poll, released Sep 17 by CHA league officials.

== Exhibition ==
Date	Opponent	Time	Location	Score
Sun, Sep 27	Guelph	2:00 p.m.	Tennity Ice Pavilion	Guelph, 3–1

== Regular season ==
- Dec. 12–13: Stefanie Marty was part of all four Orange goals in Friday’s 4–3 win over Princeton. With the Orange trailing 1–0, she tied the game with a goal. Facing a 3–1 deficit, she scored a goal and then assisted on the next two goals (both on the power-play).
- February 17: Lucy Schoedel is among 45 nominees for the Patty Kazmaier Memorial Award.
- Syracuse forward Stefanie Marty competed for her native Switzerland in Ice hockey at the 2010 Winter Olympics.

=== Standings ===
2009–10 College Hockey America standings
	Overall							Conference					
	GP	W	L	T	PTS	GF	GA	GP	W	L	T	GF	GA
x, y: Mercyhurst	23	19	1	3	41	0	0	7	6	0	1	0	0
Syracuse	26	13	12	1	27	0	0	8	4	4	0	0	0
Wayne State	22	8	11	3	19	0	0	8	4	4	0	0	0
Niagara	22	8	10	4	20	0	0	8	3	3	2	0	0
Robert Morris	25	7	17	1	15	0	0	7	0	6	1	0	0

x: Regular season champion, y: Postseason champion

=== Roster ===
Number	Name	Position	Height	Class
2	Taylor Metcalfe	Defenseman	5–9	So.
3	Kelly Dimmen	Defenseman	5–6	So.
4	Kylie Klassen	Forward	5–9	So.
6	Katelyn Bero	Forward	5–3	So.
8	Rebecca Gordon	Forward	5–10	Jr.
9	Stefanie Marty	Forward	5–5	Jr.
11	Nicole Feltes	Forward	5–5	So.
12	Julie Rising	Forward	5–6	Jr.
13	Janelle Malcolm	Forward	5–5	So.
14	Megan Skelly	Forward	5–5	So.
19	Gabrielle Beaudry	Defenseman	5–7	Sr.
20	Lisa Mullan	Forward	5–9	So.
30	Stephanie Jones	Goaltender	5–6	So.
41	Lucy Schoedel	Goalie	5–6	Sr.

=== Schedule ===
Date	Opponent	Time	Location	Score	Record
Fri, Oct 2	Minnesota	7:00 p.m.	Minneapolis, Minn.	Loss, 4–3	0–1–0
Sun, Oct 4	Minnesota	3:00 p.m.	Minneapolis, Minn.	Loss, 4–1	0–2–0
Fri, Oct 9	Boston College	2:00 p.m.	Chestnut Hill, Mass.	3–3	0–2–1
Sat, Oct 10	New Hampshire	5:00 p.m.	Durham, N.H.	Loss, 2–1	0–3–1
Fri, Oct 16	Connecticut	7:00 p.m.	Storrs, Conn.	Loss, 3–2	0–4–1
Sat, Oct 17	Providence	4:00 p.m.	Providence, R.I.	Win, 3–1	1–4–1
Fri, Oct 23	Renesselaer Polytechnic Institute	2:30 p.m.	Troy, N.Y.	Win, 3–2	2–4–1
Sat, Oct 24	Renesselaer Polytechnic Institute	2:00 p.m.	Troy, N.Y.	Win, 4–3	3–4–1
Fri, Nov 6	Niagara	7:00 p.m.	Tennity Ice Pavilion	Win, 2–1	4–4–1
Sat, Nov 7	Niagara	2:00 p.m.	Tennity Ice Pavilion	Loss, 2–3	4–5–1
Fri, Nov 20	Robert Morris	7:00 p.m.	Moon Twp., Pa.	4–0	5–5–1
Sat, Nov 21	Robert Morris	7:00 p.m.	Moon Twp., Pa.	4–2	6–5–1
Tue, Nov 24	Colgate	7:00 p.m.	Hamilton, N.Y.	Loss, 5–4	6–6–1
Sat, Nov 28	Union	2:00 p.m.	Tennity Ice Pavilion	4–1	7–6–1
Sun, Nov 29	Union	2:00 p.m.	Tennity Ice Pavilion	3–2	8–6–1
Fri, Dec 4	Wayne State	7:00 p.m.	Tennity Ice Pavilion	Loss, 3–1	8–7–1
Sat, Dec 5	Wayne State	2:00 p.m.	Tennity Ice Pavilion	3–2	9–7–1
Fri, Dec 11	Princeton	7:00 p.m.	Tennity Ice Pavilion	4–3	10–7–1
Sat, Dec 12	Princeton	2:00 p.m.	Tennity Ice Pavilion	1–0 (OT)	11–7–1
Sat, Jan 2	Colgate	4:00 p.m.	Tennity Ice Pavilion	Loss, 5–4 (OT)	11–8–1
Tue, Jan 5	Cornell	7:00 p.m.	Ithaca, N.Y.	Win, 1–0 (OT)	12–8–1
Fri, Jan 8	St. Anselm	4:00 p.m.	Goffstown, N.H.		
Fri, Jan 15	Quinnipiac	7:00 p.m.	Tennity Ice Pavilion		
Sat, Jan 16	Quinnipiac	2:00 p.m.	Tennity Ice Pavilion		
Fri, Jan 22	Mercyhurst	7:00 p.m.	Tennity Ice Pavilion		
Sat, Jan 23	Mercyhurst	2:00 p.m.	Tennity Ice Pavilion		
Fri, Jan 29	Wayne State	7:00 p.m.	Detroit, Mich.		
Sat, Jan 30	Wayne State	2:00 p.m.	Detroit, Mich.		
Fri, Feb 5	Niagara	7:00 p.m.	Niagara University, N.Y.		
Sat, Feb 6	Niagara	2:00 p.m.	Niagara University, N.Y.		
Fri, Feb 12	Robert Morris	7:00 p.m.	Tennity Ice Pavilion		
Sat, Feb 13	Robert Morris	7:00 p.m.	Tennity Ice Pavilion		
Fri, Feb 26	Mercyhurst	7:00 p.m.	Erie, Pa.		
Sat, Feb 27	Mercyhurst	2:00 p.m.	Erie, Pa.		

== Player stats ==
=== Skaters ===
= Indicates team leader

Player	Games	Goals	Assists	Points	Points/game	PIM	GWG	PPG	SHG
Isabel Menard	35	15	22	37	1.0571	34	2	3	1
Julie Rising	36	16	15	31	0.8611	24	4	6	0
Stefanie Marty	29	16	15	31	1.0690	30	2	7	0
Holly Carrie-Mattimoe	34	9	18	27	0.7941	4	2	5	1
Lisa Mullan	36	11	8	19	0.5278	30	2	2	0
Brittaney Maschmeyer	36	2	16	18	0.5000	14	0	2	0
Megan Skelly	35	7	7	14	0.4000	42	1	2	0
Gabrielle Beaudry	36	2	9	11	0.3056	32	1	0	0
Janelle Malcolm	35	6	3	9	0.2571	24	2	2	0
Jessica Sorensen	35	3	5	8	0.2286	6	1	1	0
Erin Burns	32	2	5	7	0.2188	44	1	1	0
Kylie Klassen	36	2	3	5	0.1389	8	0	0	0
Kelsey Welch	35	1	2	3	0.0857	6	0	1	0
Kelly Dimmen	34	0	3	3	0.0882	6	0	0	0
Jacquie Greco	35	0	2	2	0.0571	22	0	0	0
Taylor Metcalfe	30	0	2	2	0.0667	10	0	0	0
Lucy Schoedel	36	0	2	2	0.0556	2	0	0	0
Rebecca Gordon	35	0	2	2	0.0571	14	0	0	0
Linnea Chruscielski	5	0	0	0	0.0000	0	0	0	0
Talia Menard	36	0	0	0	0.0000	6	0	0	0
Nicole Feltes	6	0	0	0	0.0000	0	0	0	0
Katelyn Bero	4	0	0	0	0.0000	0	0	0	0
Steph Jones	1	0	0	0	0.0000	0	0	0	0
Keeta Koalska	6	0	0	0	0.0000	0	0	0	0

== Postseason ==
- On March 5, 2010, the Orange won the first playoff game in program history. Sophomore Lisa Mullan scored two goals, as the Orange defeated Niagara by a score of 5–3. In addition, freshman Isabel Menard added three points.
- Although Syracuse lost to Mercyhurst 3–1 in the College Hockey America championship game, Orange goaltender Lucy Schoedel recorded a career-best and set a CHA Tournament record with 48 saves.

== Awards and honors ==
- Gabrielle Beaudry, CHA Defensive Player of the Week (February 15)
- Erin Burns, CHA Rookie of the Week (November 30)
- Holly Carrie-Mattimoe, CHA Rookie of the Week (Week of January 11)
- Paul Flanagan, CHA Coach of the Year
- Stefanie Marty, CHA Offensive Player of the Week, (Week of October 12)
- Stefany Marty, CHA Offensive Player of the Week, (Week of December 13)
- Isabel Menard, CHA Rookie of the Week, (Week of October 12)
- Isabel Menard, CHA Rookie of the Week, (Week of October 19)
- Isabel Menard, CHA Rookie of the Week, (Week of November 23)
- Isabel Menard, CHA Rookie of the Week, (Week of December 7)
- Isabel Menard named Rookie of the Week (Week of February 8)
- Isabel Menard, CHA Rookie of the Year
- Julie Rising, CHA Player of the Week, (Week of February 1)
- Lucy Schoedel, CHA Defensive Player of the Week, (Week of November 23)
- Lucy Schoedel, CHA Defensive Player of the Week, (Week of December 13)
- Lucy Schoedel, Nominee for Patty Kazmaier Memorial Award

=== Pre-Season All-CHA Team ===
- G – Lucy Schoedel, (tie)

=== All-CHA First Team ===
- Isabel Menard, First Team All-CHA

=== All-CHA Second Team ===
- Stefanie Marty, Second Team All-CHA
- Brittaney Maschmeyer, Second Team All-CHA
- Gabrielle Beaudry, Second Team All-CHA
- Lucy Schoedel, Second Team All-CHA

=== CHA All-Rookie Team ===
- Holly Carrie-Mattimoe, F, Syracuse
- Isabel Menard, F, Syracuse

=== CHA All-Tournament Team ===
- Lisa Mullan
- Gabrielle Beaudry
- Lucy Schoedel

== See also ==
- 2009–10 College Hockey America women's ice hockey season
